= List of wars involving the Chechen Republic of Ichkeria =

This is a list of wars and conflicts involving the Chechen Republic of Ichkeria.

Chechen victory
Chechen defeat
Another result (e.g. a treaty or peace without a clear result, status quo ante bellum, result of civil war or internal conflict, result unknown, mixed results, stalemate, ceasefire or indecisive)
Ongoing conflict

Conflict	Combatant 1	Combatant 2	Result
Georgian Civil War (1991-1993)	(Georgia (country)) Pro-Gamsakhurdia forces: 22 December 1991 – 6 January 1992 (Georgia (country)) Government of Georgia; National Guard of Georgia 6 January 1992 – March 1992 (Georgia (country)) National Disobedience Committee March 1992 – September 1993 (Georgia (country)) Gamsakhurdia's government-in-exile; Partisans; Units of the National Guard 2 September 1993 – 6 November 1993 (Georgia (country)) Zugdidi-based government 6 November 1993 – 31 December 1993 (Georgia (country)) Partisans; Supported by: Chechen Republic of Ichkeria	(Georgia (country)) Pro-Shevardnadze forces: 22 December 1991 – 6 January 1992 (Georgia (country)) Rebel factions of the National Guard Mkhedrioni Tetri Artsivi Merab Kostava Society Union of Afghans (Note: Georgians who fought for the Soviet army in Afghanistan); 2 January 1992 – 10 March 1992 (Georgia (country)) Military Council; Interim Government; 10 March 1992 – October 1992 (Georgia (country)) State Council; Interim Government; October 1992 – 31 December 1993 (Georgia (country)) Government of Georgia; Georgian Armed Forces; Internal Troops of Georgia; National Guard of Georgia; Supported by: Russia	Defeat: Exile and death of first President of Georgia, Zviad Gamsakhurdia; Georgia joins the Commonwealth of Independent States
First Chechen War (1994-1996)	Chechen Republic of Ichkeria Foreign volunteers: Foreign Mujahideen; UNA-UNSO; Grey Wolves	Russian Government: Loyalist opposition	Victory: Khasavyurt Accord; Russia-Chechnya Peace Treaty; Chechen Republic of Ichkeria becomes an independent state
War in Dagestan (1999) (1999)	Islamic Djamaat of Dagestan: CPID; Chechnya: IIPB; SPIR; Religious Police	Russia: Armed Forces; Army; Navy; Air Force; VDV; Spetsnaz GRU; FSB; MVD; Militsiya; Internal Troops; OMON; Dagestan; (Dagestan) Dagestani police and local militia	Russian victory
Second Chechen War (1999-2009)	Chechen Republic of Ichkeria (1999–2007): Caucasian Front (2005–2007); Caucasus Emirate (2007–2009): North Caucasian volunteers; Mujahideen Grey Wolves	Russia: Provisional Council (until 2000); Chechen Republic (from 2000)	Defeat: Fall and exile of the Chechen Republic of Ichkeria; Establishment of the Chechen Republic; Beginning of the insurgency in the North Caucasus; Chechnya reincorporated into Russia
