= Military Council (Georgia) =

Former national security body of Georgia

Republic of Georgia საქართველოს რესპუბლიკა (Georgian)
- 1992
- Flag Coat of arms
- Motto: ძალა ერთობაშია Dzala ertobashia "Strength is in Unity"
- Anthem: დიდება Dideba "Glory"
- Capital: Tbilisi
- Official languages: Georgian
- Recognised regional languages: Abkhaz (in the Autonomous Republic of Abkhazia)
- Demonym: Georgian
- Government: Provisional military junta
  - Chairmen: Jaba Ioseliani and Tengiz Kitovani
  - Prime Minister: Tengiz Sigua
- Legislature: Military Council
- Historical era: Post-Soviet era
  - Formation: 2 January 1992
  - Control over Georgia attained: 6 January 1992
  - State Council established: 10 March 1992

Area
  - Total: 69,700 km^{2} (26,900 sq mi)
- Currency: Russian ruble (RUB)
- Time zone: GET
- Calling code: +7 882/883
- ISO 3166 code: GE
Preceded by	Succeeded by
Republic of Georgia	State Council
- Today part of: Georgia (Note: Including de facto republics of Abkhazia and South Ossetia)

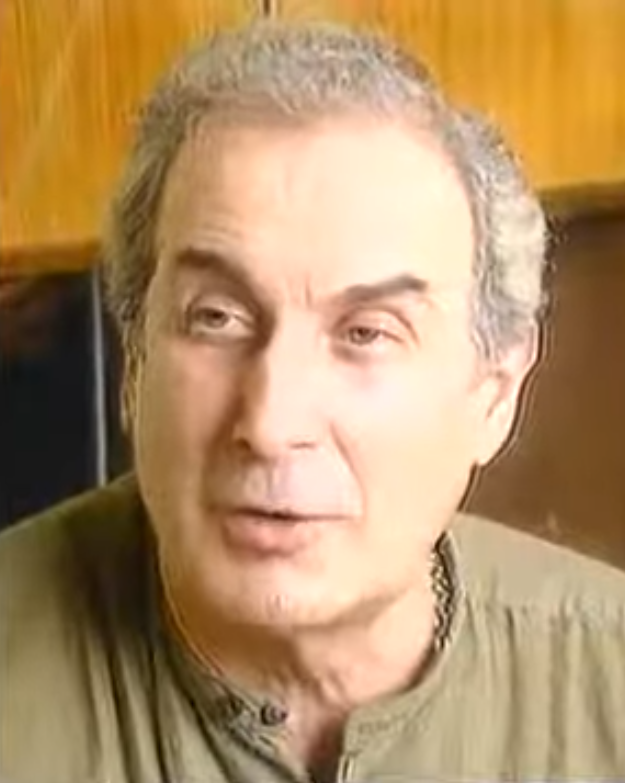
Jaba Ioseliani

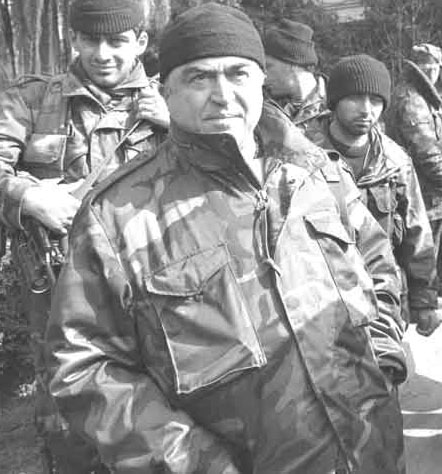
Tengiz Kitovani

The Military Council of Georgia (Georgian: საქართველოს რესპუბლიკის სამხედრო საბჭო, romanized: sakartvelos resp'ublik'is samkhedro sabch'o) was the ruling military junta of the Government of Georgia which was established on January 2, 1992, during the coup d'état in Republic of Georgia. It was an unconstitutional body that served as the leadership of the country for just over 2 months. The council announced the overthrow of President Zviad Gamsakhurdia and served as the collective head of state from January 6, 1992, until March 10 of that year, when the military council was replaced by the State Council led by Eduard Shevardnadze. The full composition of the Military Council was never published, with all orders and resolutions being signed by Tengiz Kitovani and Jaba Ioseliani on behalf of the council.

== Background ==
During the dissolution of the Soviet Union, an opposition movement in Soviet Georgia organized mass protests starting in 1988, demanding independence. The following year, the brutal suppression by Soviet forces of a large peaceful demonstration held in Tbilisi on 4–9 April 1989 proved to be a pivotal event in discrediting the continuation of Soviet rule over the country. In March 1990, the Communist Party of Georgia agreed to hold the multi-party elections, which proved to be the first multi-party elections in the entire Soviet Union in which the opposition groups were allowed to register as formal political parties. The elections, held in October 1990, resulted in the opposition Round Table—Free Georgia coalition led by Zviad Gamsakhurdia securing victory and forming a new government. However, the previously united opposition had split into two main factions in May 1990 and Gamsakhurdia's tenure began with the groups such as the National Democratic Party of Gia Chanturia and the National Independence Party of Irakli Tsereteli challenging his rule with the same methods used against the Soviet government: street demonstrations, rallies, hunger strikes and etc.

On 18 August 1991, during the coup in Moscow by Soviet hardliners aiming to stop the collapse of the USSR, President Gamsakhurdia reorganized the National Guard of Georgia into the special branch of the Georgian police to assuage the State Committee on the State of Emergency. In addition, Gamsakhurdia removed Tengiz Kitovani from the post of the commander of the National Guard. This led to the National Guard splitting into two factions; pro- and anti-Gamsakhurdia, the latter being headed by Kitovani.

In September 1991, the protests against the Gamsakhurdia government in Tbilisi turned violent. The rebel factions of the National Guard proceeded to seize a government broadcast station in the middle of September. From September–November 1991, Tbilisi was a physically divided city. The opposition controlled the Philharmonia Hall, Tbilisi State University, the Marx–Engels–Lenin Institute, and the TV studios of the city, and on September 25, Gamsakhurdia declared a state of emergency in the city.

=== Coup d'état ===
On December 21, 1991, a coup d'état started against Gamsakhurdia amidst the bloody fighting between government forces and anti-Gamsakhurdia troops. As the days went by, the central part of the city of Tbilisi was transformed into a battlefield, instead of just being divided. The anti-Gamsakhurdia forces mainly consisted of the rebel factions of the Georgian National Guard and the pro-opposition Mkhedrioni paramilitary. The coup was led by their respective commanders: Tengiz Kitovani and former thief in law Jaba Iosseliani.

== Formation ==
By a declaration issued by the coup leaders on January 2, 1992, the Military Council proclaimed its existence and the deposition of the President of Georgia at the time, Zviad Gamsakhurdia, the dissolution of the Supreme Council, and the removal of the Prime Minister of Georgia, Besariona Gugushvili.

By January 6, 1992, the capital of Tbilisi had been sieged for 2 weeks straight, with the anti-Gamsakhurdia forces effectively establishing the control over the city. On that day, at around 05:00, President Gamsakhurdia, along with his family and his 100 bodyguards, who had taken refuge in a reinforced shelter up to then, fled to Azerbaijan’s Qazax district, but was denied anything but safe transit. He left the rest of his 100 bodyguards behind there; but was also told by Armenia that they would only allow temporary asylum in the city of Ijevan, however, soon afterwards, the President of the Chechen Republic of Ichkeria, Dzhokhar Dudayev, offered asylum to Gamsakhurdia, and Armenia allowed him to move to Chechnya for the aforementioned asylum.

The Military Council, however, said they wanted Gamsakhurdia back. It played the role of the collective head of State after the exile of Gamsakhurdia, with the duties of the Prime Minister being assigned to Tengiz Sigua. The Military Council's self-proclaimed goal was to preserve democracy, stabilise society before new elections and economic reforms.

The full composition of the council was never published or recorded on paper. All orders and resolutions issued on behalf of the Military Council were signed by Tengiz Kitovani and Jaba Ioseliani as members of the council. There is evidence that the third member of the council was Acting Prime Minister of Georgia Tengiz Sigua, but he never signed any documents on behalf of the council.

Tengiz Sigua formed a new provisional government, and the ministers were appointed without extensive discussion, taking into account their reputation and personal recommendations. There were quite a few representatives of the new government with background in Soviet bureaucracy and experience in economic and public administration. As a matter of priority, the government raised civil servants' salaries and pensions, abolished state duties for the privatization of apartments, and also canceled the nationalization of enterprises under Gamsakhurdia. Levan Sharashenidze, a professional military officer, was appointed as the Lieutenant General of the Minister of Defense of Georgia. The popular police chief Roman Gvantsadze was appointed as Minister of Internal Affairs.

The advisory political body of the Military Council was the Political Advisory Committee, to which all political forces were invited according to the formula "all minus one" (meaning the exclusion of Zviad Gamsakhurdia personally). To demonstrate readiness for national reconciliation, the following persons were invited to join the committee: Zviadists, as well as representatives of non-Georgian ethnic minorities. The Military Council made several important political gestures: it declared the press and media free and independent of the state, released the South Ossetian separatist leader Torez Kulumbegov from custody, declared the university autonomy, and participated in meetings of CIS heads of states.

== Council activities ==
On January 3, the Military Council in Tbilisi declared a state of emergency, and prohibited all rallies and demonstrations. On January 6, the Military Council issued a declaration regarding the Supreme Soviet and the President of Georgia, announcing that the country was the legal successor to the Georgian SSR, restored the 1921 Constitution of the Democratic Republic of Georgia, and declared the government of the Georgian Soviet Socialist Republic illegal, saying "It is unacceptable to replace one illegal government with another equally illegal one", and emphasised "the need to restore legitimate constitutional authority in Georgia". And it also accused Gamsakhurdia of authoritarianism and government usurpation.

On January 10, Acting Prime Minister Tengiz Sigua decreed to establish the following:

- The activities of the Sakrebuloebi should be restored throughout the territory of Georgia
- The Sakrebuloebi have 10 days time to hold administrative elections with secret ballots
- The composition of the new administration has to be sent in for approval to the government, temporarily
- The Acting Prime Minister is given the right to elect the Mayor of Tbilisi and others.

== Clashes in Western Georgia ==
Amidst the coup in Tbilisi, pockets of resistance emerged in Western Georgia refusing to recognize the Military Council. In response, the Council authorized its troops to advance against the pro-Gamsakhurdia guerrillas. On January 21 at night, Jaba Ioseliani and Military Commissioner of Zugdidi, Giorgi Karkarashvili, met with Deputy of the Supreme Council of Georgia Walter Shurgaya and former Prefect of Zugdidi A. Kobalia. During the conversation, Jaba Ioseliani issued an ultimatum to the parties that the armed forces stationed in Zugdidi should lay down their weapons and ensure the liberation of Zugdidi without losses. The last stronghold of pro-Gamsakhurdia forces, Poti, a strategic port town in Mingrelia, was seized by the troops of the Military Council on 27 January, resulting in dozens of deaths and injuries.

== Foreign relations ==
On 8 February 1992, the acting Prime Minister of Georgia Tengiz Sigua participated in the Commonwealth of Independent States summit as an observer, and signed a treaty creating inter-republican commission including the CIS countries and Georgia to work on the practical questions of food imports. However, it would not be until October 1993 that Georgia would finally agree on joining the CIS.

On 18 February 1992, Sigua met the US Secretary of State James Baker in Moscow. The meeting was only informal, which served to demonstrate that although US was critical of the Gamsakhurdia administration, it still did not approve the way the opposition took power. The US refused to recognize the Military Council. Baker said that he planned to protest the armed takeover and press for new elections in Georgia.

== Dissolution ==
The seizure of power by the Military Council was perceived neutrally and positively among the CIS heads of state. However, in just over two months of activity, the Military Council had failed to make significant progress in stabilizing the situation in Georgia and achieving international legitimacy. This was hampered by inter-ethnic conflicts, political strife, the economic crisis and anarchy in Western Georgia, which gradually turned into a civil war. International contacts were hindered by Ioseliani's well-known status as a crowned king the kingpin and Kitovani's criminal past.

In early March, a delegation of the Military Council went to Moscow to ask former Soviet Georgian leader Eduard Shevardnadze to lead Georgia. Within a few days of his consent and return to Georgia, on March 10, 1992, the Military Council decided to dissolve itself and transfer power to the newly formed State Council of Georgia, led by Eduard Shevardnadze.

== Aftermath ==
The leaders of the Military Council failed to convincingly legitimise their power either at home or in the international arena, and after a relatively short period of time they were forced to turn to Eduard Shevardnadze with a request to head the provisional government in Georgia. Shevardnadze's arrival, the creation of the State Council and the simultaneous dissolution of the Military Council marked the beginning of the re-establishment of legitimate state power in Georgia.
