= 1991–1992 Georgian coup d'état =

Coup d'état against Georgian president Zviad Gamsakhurdia

- Part of the Georgian Civil War
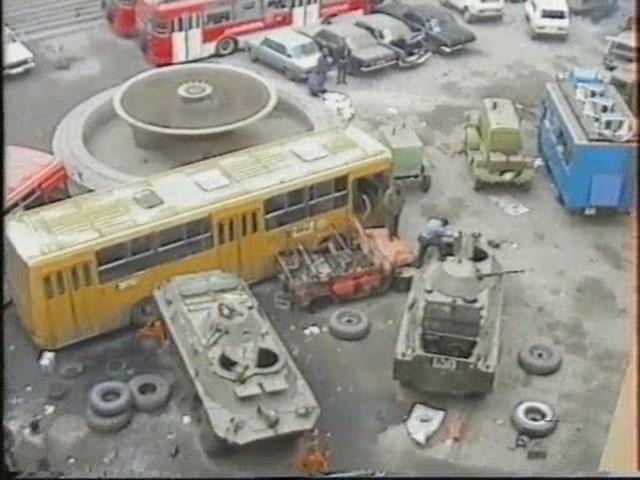
- Inside the garden of the Parliament building after the coup
Date	22 December 1991–6 January 1992
Location	Tbilisi and Rustavi, Georgia
Result	Collapse of the Gamsakhurdia government and his exile; Military council takes over; Beginning of the Georgian Civil War

Belligerents
(Georgia (country)) National Guard of Georgia; Black Pantyhose Battalion; Lemi; Supported by: Chechnya	(Georgia (country)) Rebel factions of the National Guard; Mkhedrioni; Tetri Artsivi; Merab Kostava Society; Union of Afghans; Replaced on 2 Jan by: (Georgia (country)) Military Council; Supported by: Russia; Transcaucasian Military District

Commanders and leaders
(Georgia (country)) Zviad Gamsakhurdia (Georgia (country)) Loti Kobalia	(Georgia (country)) Tengiz Kitovani (Georgia (country)) Tengiz Sigua; Jaba Ioseliani (Georgia (country)) Gia Karkarashvili (Georgia (country)) Vazha Adamia

Strength
(Georgia (country)) 1,000–4,000	(Georgia (country)) 2,000; 600–5,000

Casualties and losses
- 113 dead Around 700 injured

The 1991–1992 Georgian coup d'état, also known as the Tbilisi War, or the Putsch of 1991–1992, was an internal military conflict that took place in the newly independent Republic of Georgia following the fall of the Soviet Union, from 22 December 1991 to 6 January 1992. The coup, which triggered the Georgian Civil War, pitted factions of the National Guard loyal to President Zviad Gamsakhurdia against several paramilitary organizations unified at the end of 1991 under the leadership of warlords Tengiz Kitovani, Jaba Ioseliani and Tengiz Sigua.

The Tbilisi War ended with the exile of the first democratically elected president of Georgia, after two weeks of violent clashes on Rustaveli Avenue, the main thoroughfare of Tbilisi, mainly consisting of a siege of the Georgian Parliament building, where Gamsakhurdia was isolated in a bunker. Following Gamsakhurdia's fall, a Military Council, led by Kitovani, Ioseliani and Sigua, took power in Tbilisi and assured the return of Eduard Shevardnadze, the former Soviet Georgian leader and the last Soviet Foreign Affairs Minister, to hand over power to him. During the civil war, the supporters of the ousted president staged an unsuccessful revolt to return him to power. Shevardnadze gradually sidelined Kitovani and Ioseliani, and ruled the country until he was ousted in the bloodless 2003 "Rose Revolution".

In 2005, the Parliament of Georgia passed a resolution denouncing the events of 1991–1992 as an "anticonstitutional armed coup d'état". According to a 2020 poll by the Caucasus Research Resource Centers, 76% of Georgians think that the coup was harmful for Georgia.

== Historical background ==
=== Fall of the Soviet Union ===
Following the Red Army invasion of 1921 and Bolshevik takeover, Georgia became part of the Soviet Union (formed in 1922). Despite having formally a status of a sovereign "union republic" (the Socialist Soviet Republic of Georgia), nationalist feelings demanding independence developed in Georgia largely in the 1970s, feelings that were repeated across the Soviet Union. (Note: Besides the events in Georgia, nationalist movements gained momentum in Azerbaijan, Lithuania, Moldova, Latvia, Armenia, and Estonia.) Major economic and social problems, and repression of nationalist movements led to several protests in Georgia, culminating with the 9 April 1989 Tragedy, when a protest in Tbilisi was repressed by the authorities, resulting in the death of 21 people and the arrest of the main opposition leaders, including Zviad Gamsakhurdia.

The Tbilisi Tragedy, coupled with the military failure in Afghanistan and the collapse of the Iron Curtain that separated Western world from the Eastern Bloc led to a chain reaction that saw the Baltic states declare their independence in 1990. Soon, Soviet authorities, under pressure of mass revolts, allowed multi-party elections in October 1990, which saw Round Table, the alliance led by Zviad Gamsakhurdia, winning a majority of the seats in the Supreme Council, which ended 69 years of Communist Party. However, the previously united Georgian nationalist opposition split into two main factions in May 1990. Gamsakhurdia's tenure began with groups such as the National Democratic Party of Gia Chanturia and the National Independence Party of Irakli Tsereteli challenging his authority with street demonstrations, rallies, hunger strikes etc.

=== Ethnic Conflicts ===
The dissolution of the Soviet Union led to a rebirth of tensions between certain ethnic groups across the Union republics, Georgia being no exception. Adamon Nikhas, a communist movement in South Ossetia, started to demand greater autonomy from Tbilisi as early as the late 1980s, a request denied by the central government in November 1989. Tensions between Tbilisi and Tskhinvali rose until a declaration of sovereignty of South Ossetia from Georgia within the Soviet Union in September 1990, following which Tbilisi retaliated by abolishing the Autonomous Oblast of South Ossetia.

In January 1991, the militarization of the conflict divided Tskhinvali in two, thus launching a civil war that lasted until June 1992 and that lead to the creation of the separatist Republic of South Ossetia.

Meanwhile, Abkhazia fell into ethnic conflict. As early as 1989, violent clashes between Georgian and Abkhaz nationalists plunged the region into violent conflict that later extended into a "war of laws" between the legislatures of Tbilisi and of the Autonomous Soviet Socialist Republic of Abkhazia.

== Prelude ==
=== Declaration of Independence ===
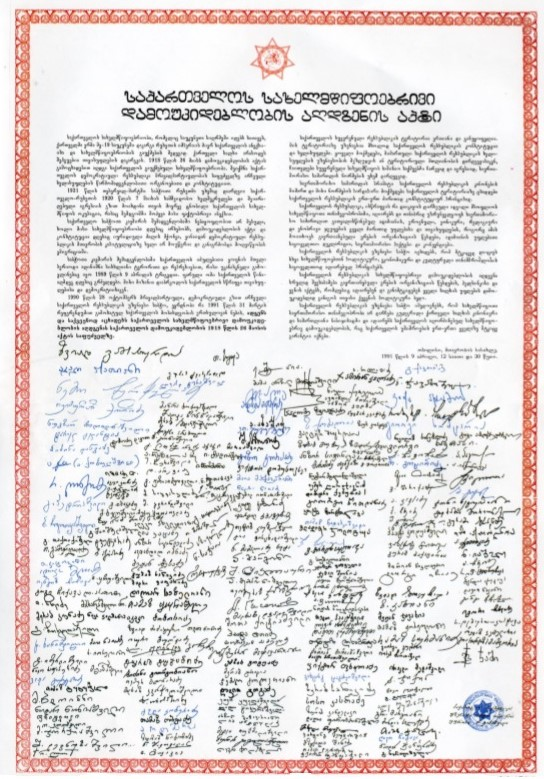
The Act of Restoration of Georgian Independence signed on 9 April 1991.

On 9 April 1991, two years after the Tbilisi Tragedy and ten days after a largely victorious referendum on the subject, the Georgian Supreme Council declared the country's independence, appointing famed dissident and Georgian nationalist Zviad Gamsakhurdia as interim president. The latter was eventually elected president with 86% of the vote in an election that saw an 83% participation rate on 26 May. Gamsakhurdia was notably granted presidential powers by the Parliament, including:

- Veto power over any law approved in Parliament;
- War declarations and power to declare martial law;
- Appointment powers over the Prime Minister, the presiding judge of the Supreme Court, the Prosecutor General, and the commander-in-chief of the armed forces;
- A total immunity

=== First signs of the crisis ===
In January 1991, Zviad Gamsakhurdia signed an executive decree creating the National Guard of Georgia, a prelude to the future Georgian Army, under the jurisdiction of the new Ministry of Internal Affairs. At its head, he appointed Tengiz Kitovani, recently elected to the Supreme Council of Georgia with Gamsakhurdia's party, with a mission to recruit 20,000 capable soldiers. Meanwhile, the government attempted to reign in the various paramilitary organizations which had recently emerged in the country and were utilized by the political forces. In February, the Ministry of Internal Affairs, while attempting to shut down the several paramilitary organizations, arrested ten members of the opposition National Democratic Party (NDP) and 56 members of the opposition Mkhedrioni paramilitary, including its leader, Jaba Ioseliani, a former criminal-turned-theater critique, for illegal possession of the weapons in Kakheti.

The first signs of crisis also developed within the government on 9 August 1991, with an argument in the Supreme Council of Georgia between Gamsakhurdia and Vazha Adamia, the leader of the Merab Kostava Society, a political and paramilitary organization that was part of the Round Table coalition. Adamia, who was head of the parliamentary commission on defense, national security and order, would eventually resign in September 1991, with his organization joining the opposition. According to some sources, the confrontation was caused by the conflict between Adamia and the head of the National Guard of Georgia, Tengiz Kitovani. Gamsakhurdia sided with the latter.

=== Kitovani Leaves ===
Kitovani in the Rkoni Gorge following his mutiny.

Kitovani largely collaborated with Gamsakhurdia's war in South Ossetia, launching several assaults on the regions outside of Tbilisi's control between February and June 1991. However, the situation changed drastically during the summer of that same year.

On 18 August, three ministers, including Prime Minister Tengiz Sigua, announced their support for the opposition and resigned from their posts, accusing the President of becoming a "totalitarian demagogue." Gamsakhurdia took himself the helm of the Ministries of Foreign Affairs and Justice. An attempted putsch in Moscow the next day brought a new controversy. The State Committee on the State of Emergency ordered all republics, including Georgia, to disband their new armed forces. Gamsakhurdia issued a presidential decree bringing the troops entirely within the jurisdiction of the Ministry of Internal Affairs. The position of commander of the National Guard was abolished, with Kitovani being dismissed. According to Gamsakhurdia, he never had the intention to disband the National Guard, and he simply reorganized it to protect it from the Moscow coup leaders. Gamsakhurdia later would allege in October 1991 that Kitovani together with Sigua had been threatening him with armed mutiny in spring of 1991 over disagreements on cadre policy. In response to his decree, Kitovani and the opposition accused Gamsakhurdia of secretly siding with the Moscow coup plotters. Tengiz Kitovani, opposing his decision, left Tbilisi with a force of around 15,000 armed men and set up camp in the Rkoni Gorge, around 40 kilometers north of the capital. He was soon joined by Tengiz Sigua and former Foreign Affairs Minister Giorgi Khoshtaria. Meanwhile, on 26 August, Gamsakhurdia banned the Communist Party for its support of the Moscow coup attempt. The party held 60 seats in the Supreme Council at the time. Tbilisi converted the local bureau of the KGB into a Department of National Security, which became a Ministry a few weeks later. A National Security Council was also created to prove that Gamsakhurdia wished to see a military infrastructure independent from Moscow.

=== First clashes ===
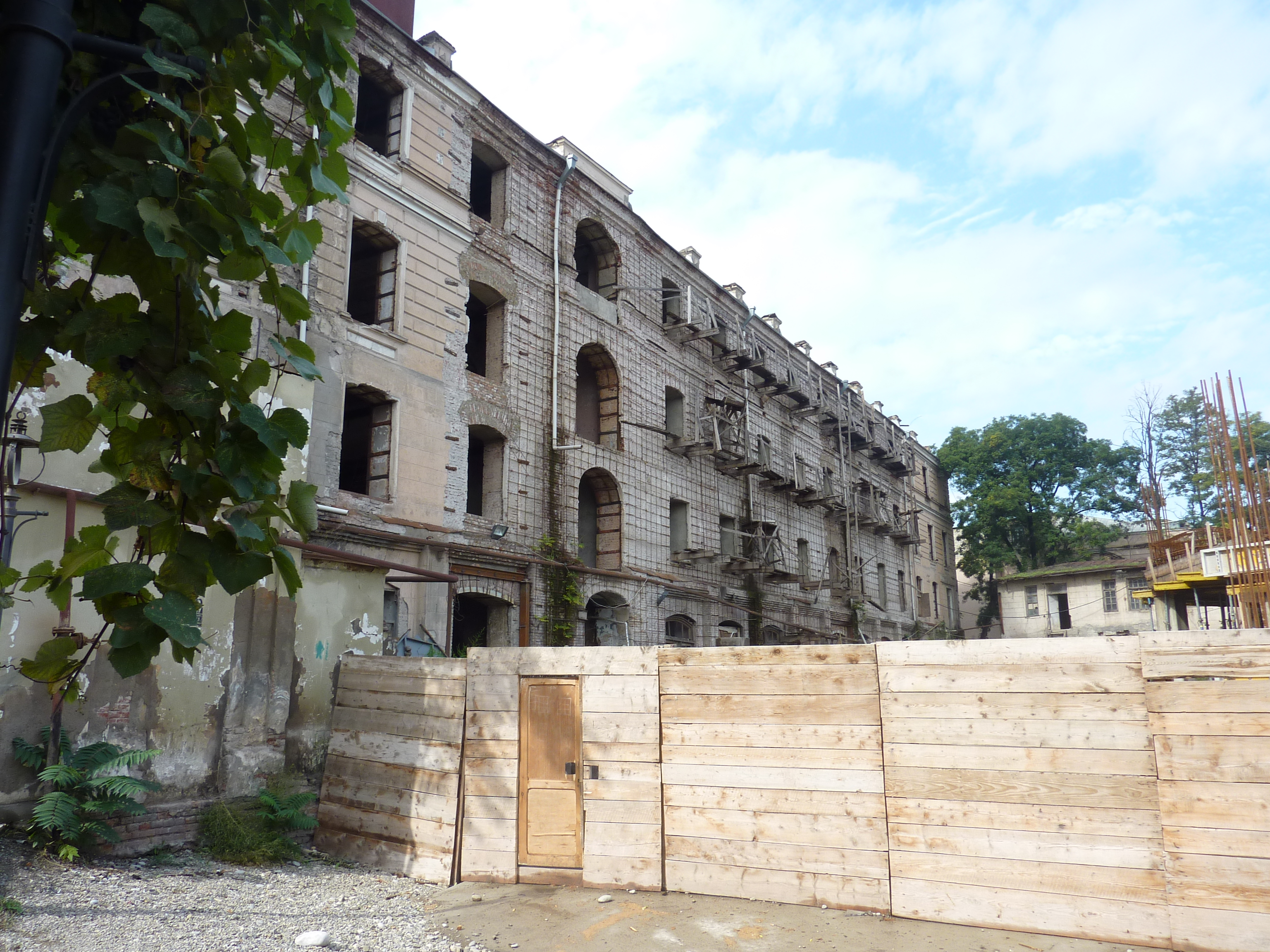
Former HQ of the Tbilisi KGB, where several political prisoners were jailed by Gamsakhurdia.

On 2 September, the situation becomes violent when demonstrations organized by the People's Front of Georgia and the NDP to ask for Jaba Ioseliani's freedom were dispersed by MIA forces. According to the non-government organization Human Rights Watch, the protesters, assembled on Rustaveli Avenue, were beaten with batons, while soldiers shot at the crowd. The incident resulted in three civilians getting injured.

Following the clashes, the situation in central Tbilisi progressively spiralled out of control. Opposition supporters erected barricades in front of opposition party headquarters and other locations. Daily demonstrations took place along Rustaveli Avenue, in front of Tbilisi State University, near the Tbilisi Television and Radio Department, and elsewhere. The city's transport network was paralyzed. On 11 September, the 27 political parties signed a resignation request for Gamsakhurdia. Meanwhile, on 9 September, Gamsakhurdia issued a decree establishing the Ministry of Defence and placing the National Guard under his personal command. On 17 September, Giorgi Chanturia, leader of the NDP, was arrested by law enforcement on charges of organizing the construction of barricades. Giorgi Khaindrava, a member of the Georgian National Congress political party, was also arrested.

Gamsakhurdia called on his supporters from across Georgia to gather in Tbilisi and clear the streets of barricades. On 21 September, government supporters moved to clear the barricades blocking Rustaveli Avenue. On 22 September, a group of several dozen protesters who were on hunger strike in front of Parliament were forcibly dispersed by 250 presidential guards and around 200 members of the so-called "Furies", women who supported Gamsakhurdia. During the night of 22–23 September, violence escalated further when around 5,000 Gamsakhurdia supporters, led by deputy Avtandil Rtskhiladze, entered the NDP headquarters, where they were confronted by some 800 opposition members.

=== Arrival of the armed opposition and the State of Emergency ===
On 23 September, the rebel factions of the Georgian National Guard led by Tengiz Kitovani entered Tbilisi to support the opposition in the clashes and seized the television station. On 24 September, Zviad Gamsakhurdia proclaimed a state of emergency. One of the first armed clashes which resulted in casualties occurred on 25 September, when the rebel units of the National Guard attempted to take over a power station in Tbilisi but were driven back by police. Four died as a result of the clash.

Since the end of September 1991, Tbilisi was a divided city. The Gldani, Nadzaladevi, and Didube neighborhoods, as well as the south and center parts of Rustaveli Avenue (housing government buildings) remained under the military control of Zviad Gamsakhurdia, who had started to isolate himself within the Supreme Council building. Neighborhoods located between the Marx-Engels-Lenin Institute (29 Rustaveli Ave.) and the Tbilisi State University (1 Chavchavadze Ave.) were loyal to the opposition, while the Mkhedrioni militia used the rest of Chavchavadze Avenue as its training ground. In the meantime, the neighborhoods of Vake and Saburtalo, populated by members of the Soviet intelligentsia, remained neutral. Each side was commanding 1,000 to 3,000 soldiers. Soviet Transcaucasian Military District, still based near Tbilisi, used the internal chaos to sell weapons to both sides in order to worsen the situation.

=== Stand-off ===
On 3 October, with the mediation of the Georgian Orthodox Church, the sides reached an agreement on the withdrawal of Kitovani's militia from Tbilisi. However, Kitovani's National Guard withdrew to the Tbilisi Sea, on the outskirts of the city, leaving it unclear whether this action complied with the agreement. On 4 October, the opposition began a large rally in front of the Supreme Council building, which was met by supporters of Gamsakhurdia, resulting in armed clashes. According to the government, opposition groups attempted to seize the Supreme Council building, a claim rejected by the opposition. Meanwhile, units of the National Guard that remained loyal to the president, led by Loti Kobalia, surrounded Kitovani's forces near Tbilisi Sea and established a blockade. However, a major confrontation was averted, with only minor skirmishes taking place. Ultimately, government forces gained the upper hand and took control of the area around the Supreme Council building. On 8 October, during a Supreme Council session chaired by Gamsakhurdia, the events of 4–5 October were officially classified as an attempted coup. Kitovani and his breakaway National Guard forces remained in the vicinity of Tbilisi until December.

Georgian Supreme Council (parliament) building on Rustaveli Avenue

Historian Dimitri Shvelidze describes the period between 4–5 October and December as a prelude to the main battle, during which both sides gathered forces and sought allies, weapons, money, and other resources. On 5 November, at the request of the Prosecutor's Office of Georgia, the Supreme Council voted to temporarily suspend the law on political parties due to the state of emergency declared in response to an attempted armed overthrow of the government. The newspaper Sakartvelo-Sakinphorm was also closed. Valery Kvaratskhelia, a TV producer, was arrested on 2 October, and Goga Khindasheli, regional secretary of the NDP in Samtredia, joined others in prison soon. On the night of 21–22 October, eleven members of the NDP were arrested as well, while Temur Zhorzholiani, leader of the Monarchist Party, was arrested on 15 November. They were all imprisoned in the Ortachala Prison in the south of Tbilisi.

=== Coup ===
On 12 December, the US Secretary of State James Baker gave speech at the Princeton University, where he talked about the American policy in the post-Soviet world. He announced:

This means we will work with those republics and any common entity which commit to responsible security policies, democratic political practices, and free market economics. Fortunately, new leaders are emerging who are committed to these principles. The three tasks I have outlined represent those areas where our principles matter the most. They also represent the responsibilities members of the Euro-Atlantic Community already have assumed. By accepting these responsibilities, new political entities in the former Soviet Union can join in the democratic commonwealth of nations, gain political acceptance, and justify our economic support.

Clearly, some - Russian, Ukraine, Kazakhstan, Armenia and Kyrgyzstan - already are showing their intention to accept the responsibilities of the democratic community of nations. They understand that their success depends, above all, on their commitment to democracy and economic liberty.

Clearly, other governments, for example, Georgia are showing already that communism can be replaced by governments that are authoritarian and equally underserving of our acceptance or support.

On 19 December, Tengiz Kitovani offered an ultimatum to Zviad Gamsakhurdia, asking for his immediate resignation. But the latter refused.

On 20 December 1991, Tengiz Kitovani returned to Tbilisi, where he unified his troops with those of the Mkhedrioni and the Merab Kostava Society militia. The next day, the Soviet Union was formally abolished and Georgia refused to join the Commonwealth of Independent States. Zviad Gamsakhurdia barricaded himself in the basement of the Parliament building.

After having arrived in the capital, Kitovani announced, "We did not fight [Gamsakhurdia] actively while international opinion on the authoritarian nature of his personal dictatorship wasn't clear. So what we're now doing is not a military coup but rather the overthrow of a dictatorship with the goal of establishing democratic order."

== Combatants ==
=== Loyalists ===
The lack of organization within governmental troops and the defection of a large amount of forces during the coup makes any attempt to estimate the size of troops loyal to Zviad Gamsakhurdia difficult. (Note: During the last days of the coup, the opposition authorizes the escape of governmental troops before launching its last assault on the Parliament building.) At the onset of the conflict, the National Guard, which includes merely a fraction of its 15,000 original soldiers following Tengiz Kitovani's secession, contributes to the majority of troops protecting the Parliament building, but the number of actual National Guard members participating in the conflict remains unknown, as a large part of the Guard remains in South Ossetia during the coup. While some western sources claim between 1,000 and 2,000 combatants fight for Gamsakhurdia, the latter estimates himself having 5,000 soldiers on his side.

Sources become blurrier in the second week of the coup. Gia Karkarashvili, who leads the Military Council's war efforts, claims that the other side has no more than 250–300 men by 4 January, while the Russian news agency Interfax reported 300–500 Zviadist soldiers the day before. Other Russian sources, meanwhile, estimate nearly 1,500 Zviadists, 60% of which being armed, on 5 January.

The Military Council, which represents the opposition, declared during the conflict that the majority of pro-Gamsakhurdia soldiers were 18 or 19 years old and were coerced into fighting. According to the council, there was only a very small group of armed fighters belonging to the government's OMON, a special, highly trained branch of the National Guard. Some of those who fought on Gamsakhurdia's side were reportedly devoted female followers of his dressed in black, known as "furies" or the "Black Pantyhose Battalion". A youth militia from the mountainous region of Svaneti, nicknamed "Lemi" (ლემი, or "Lion" in Svan) also fought for the president.

The participation of foreign mercenaries remains a controversial subject, denied by Gamsakhurdia supporters. However, during a 4 January press conference by the Military Council, the latter condemns the use of Chechen mercenaries sent by Ichkeria President and close Gamsakhurdia ally Dzhokhar Dudayev. Jaba Ioseliani, leader of the Mkhedrioni militia, states then that "Jokhar Dudaiev's position is unacceptable and misplaced, but hope remains that this quid pro quo can be fixed." On 5 January, four Ukrainian mercenaries probably working as snipers for the government are detained by the opposition.

=== Opposition ===
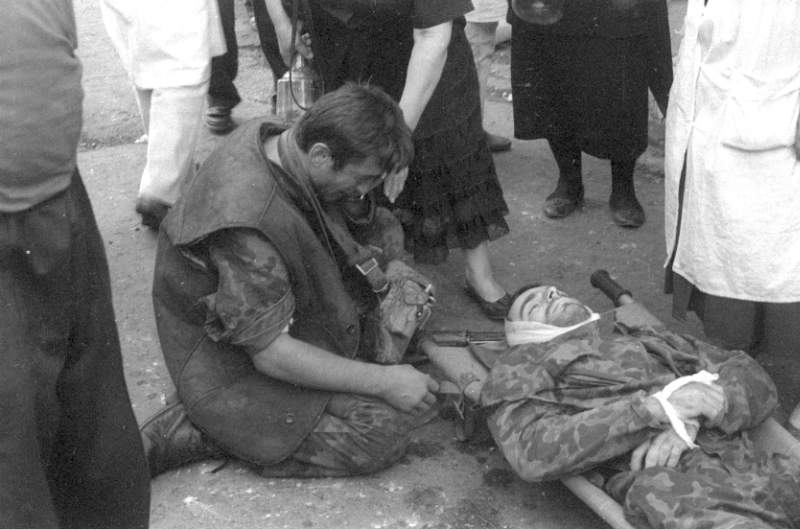
Opposition soldiers

The majority of opposition troops come from rebel factions of the National Guard that followed Tengiz Kitovani during his August 1991 mutiny. However, while an estimated 15,000 to 20,000 members of the Guard pledged allegiance to the opposition's struggle, only a small part of these combatants participated in the Tbilisi battle, while the other soldiers remain in South Ossetia or Abkhazia fighting in the 1991–1992 South Ossetia War.

Jaba Ioseliani commands a militia of 600 to 5,000 soldiers that operate under the Mkhedrioni standard. This militia remains under the direct leadership of Ioseliani, even after the opposition's unification after the 2 January 1992 proclamation of the Military Council, and it is this militia that would cause the 3 January massacre. The Merab Kostava Society, which was organized as a political movement in 1990 before becoming an armed militia led by Vazha Adamia, joined the rebel National Guard as early as 20 December 1991.

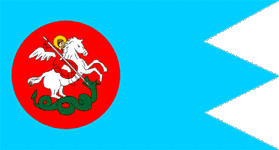
Mkhedrioni flag

Starting on 22 December, Tetri Artsivi (თეთრი არწივი, or "White Eagle"), a paramilitary group of around 80 men led by warlord Gia Karkarashvili and operating in the South Ossetia war, leaves Tskhinvali to assist the opposition. This militia would be used to put siege on Tbilisi and block all routes leading to the capital. Karkarashvili would later become one of the main figures in the Military Council, before taking the post of Minister of Defense during the Abkhazia War.

On 31 December 1991, Gia Chanturia announced that the Union of Afghans, a militia made of more than 1,000 veterans from the Soviet invasion of Afghanistan, joined the opposition forces.

=== Russian involvement ===
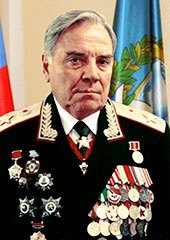
Vladimir Lobov, head of the Soviet army from 1989 to 1991.

According to the theory by historian and close Gamsakhurdia ally Leila Tsomaia, Zviad Gamsakhurdia had been given time until 07:00 on 22 December to contact Boris Yeltsin and pledge Georgia's membership into the Commonwealth of Independent States. Gamsakhurdia's refusal to do so would have been what jump-started the hostilities. This version is confirmed by the president, who accused Yeltsin of being behind the coup. On 3 January, he repeated his accusations and nicknames the coup the "Kremlin's Putsch."

During the conflict, accusations of Russian assistance to one side or another were regularly made by both the president and the opposition. Thus, Gamsakhurdia complained from within his bunker that units of the Soviet Army "are not assisting the legitimately-elected President and, instead, are providing substantial help to the bandits of the opposition." On the other hand, Jaba Ioseliani accused Gamsakhurdia of being too close to Russian intelligence services, claiming that three ministers (Foreign Affairs Minister Murman Omanidze, Internal Affairs Minister Dilar Khabuliani, and Technical Resources Minister Igor Chkheidze) were KGB agents. Despite these allegations, Yuri Grekov, First Vice-Commander of the Military District of Transcaucasia of the Soviet Army, denied any Soviet involvement in the conflict, while striking an agreement on the Soviet troops' remaining in Georgia after Gamsakhurdia's departure.

In December 1992, nearly eleven months after the end of the conflict, Moskovskiye Novosti published a letter from Colonel-General Sufian Bepayev, who was then the vice-commander of the Transcaucasian Military District of the Red Army, who claimed to have brought logistical and military help to the opposition starting on 28 December. According to that letter, lacking the interference of the Russian soldiers, "Gamsakhurdia supporters would have had a guaranteed victory." This version of the facts revealed also an involvement by Russian soldiers during the battle around the Broadcasting Tower of Tbilisi.

However, another theory was provided by Greek strategist Spyros Demetriou, who revealed in a 2002 study the large implication of Soviet forces in the civil war. Shortly after Gamsakhurdia's election in 1990, Moscow authorities authorized a covert operation of introducing a large artillery of undocumented weapons into Georgia through Armenia and Azerbaijan, to be distributed among the several paramilitary groups set up by Georgian nationalists. As soon as early 1991, large caches of AK-47s and Makarov PMs were introduced on the Vaziani Military Base and into the Georgian stations of the DOSAAF. Nine Georgian, three Ossetian, and three Abkhaz militias were thus armed before the beginning of the civil war.

During the coup itself, Sufian Bepayev may have provided weapons and armed vehicles to both sides. According to some sources, he may have begun by offering free weapons at the beginning of the coup, before starting to sell them: $200 to $300 per AK-47, $800 per Makarov PM, and $5,000 to $8,000 per armed vehicle. According to the Georgian Defense Foundation, the National Guard received, between 21 December 1991 and 6 January 1992, nearly 200 AK-47s, 50 RPG-7s, two SVD Dragunov rifles, and 200 Makarov PMs. Following the Military Council's victory, a special battalion of the National Guard was formed on 10 January and was entirely equipped by Russian military bases.

Some analyze this weapons distribution scheme to be the natural result of the lack of order among remaining Soviet armies after the downfall of the USSR, given the harsh economic conditions of the Caucasus and the corruption of high-ranking military officials. However, Demetriou revealed another theory on the shared support from the Russians:

In his attempt to define and implement foreign policy objectives in the post-Soviet sphere, Russian President Boris Yeltsin clashed with the prerogatives of conservative and hard-line political and military actors. In Georgia, these disputes manifested themselves in a duality of policy towards the conflicts. Yeltsin favored a process of dialogue, negotiation, and co-operation with the Georgian government. Russian military leaders, however, viewed the preservation of Russian military influence and strategic assets in the geostrategically important Caucasus as a primary goal to be attained even at the expense of Georgian independence and through whatever means possible. As a result, the Russian military conducted its own ‘foreign policy’ in Georgia. The goal of this ‘foreign policy’ was to counter Georgia’s rejection of any ties with Russia, such as within the CIS. The means were destabilization and the creation of a situation in which substantial and long-term Russian assistance (in the form of troops and installations) would be required. By fueling belligerents on all sides of the conflicts with weapons and other matériel, Russian military leaders accomplished both of these objectives.

== The Conflict ==
=== The First Day ===
As soon as Kitovani arrives in Tbilisi, battle plans are put into place. While the National Guard and government leaders fortify themselves within the Parliament building, Tengiz Sigua takes over the Tbilisi Hotel on Rustaveli Avenue, less than 250 meters away from Parliament, designating the building as the opposition's military headquarters. On 21 December, Otar Litanishvili, a commander of the Mkhedrioni, brings a detailed map of the capital within the HQ and military leaders plan the coming attacks. Tengiz Kitovani takes command of the upcoming assault on Parliament, being the most knowledgeable of the building's infrastructure, from his time as head of the National Guard.

The opposition's preparations are largely made on the night of 21–22 December. Giorgi Arveladze, a Mkhedrioni officer, is sent to inspect the surroundings of Parliament to confirm the location of governmental troops and soon, Rustaveli Avenue is blocked from the public, with both sides using buses and armed vehicles to isolate the most popular street of Tbilisi. Around 01:00, Gia Karkarashvili, who leads a militia of around 80 men known as Tetri Artsivi ("White Eagle"), leaves his post in Tskhinvali, where he is defending the Georgian neighborhoods of the city during the South Ossetian conflict, and sets up barricades on the main highway leading to Tbilisi from the north, in order to avoid any access to the capital, before leaving his soldiers in the outpost while bringing weapons to the opposition. His militia is armed with 50 AK-47s, 3 AKS74s, 20 AKS-74Us, and 50 cases of grenades.

The morning of 22 December, according to the witness testimony of former deputy Sandro Bregadze, Sigua orders his personal guard, led by former Soviet secret service officer Murtaz Shaluahsvili, to position itself in Alexandrov Park (today known as the April 9 Park), in order to target the Parliament. With just the Kashveti Church serving as a buffer between both camps, government authorities send Mayor Tamaz Vashadze of Tbilisi and deputy Avtandil Rtskhiladze on a negotiation mission one last time before the beginning of the hostilities, but the two are kidnapped by Sigua's forces.

Around 07:30, Murtaz Shualashvili orders the first fire against Parliament and Karkarashvili launches four rockets on the Parliament building, inaugurating two weeks of violence. According to a New York Times report, the opposition refuses to accept any responsibility with the first attack. Throughout 22 December, both sides use rockets, grenades, and automatic weapons to fight each other. The Kashveti Church, which houses opposition soldiers, becomes a target of governmental forces. The Gamsakhurdia household, nicknamed "Colchis Bell", catches fire, but the family, under governmental protection during the coup, remains safe.

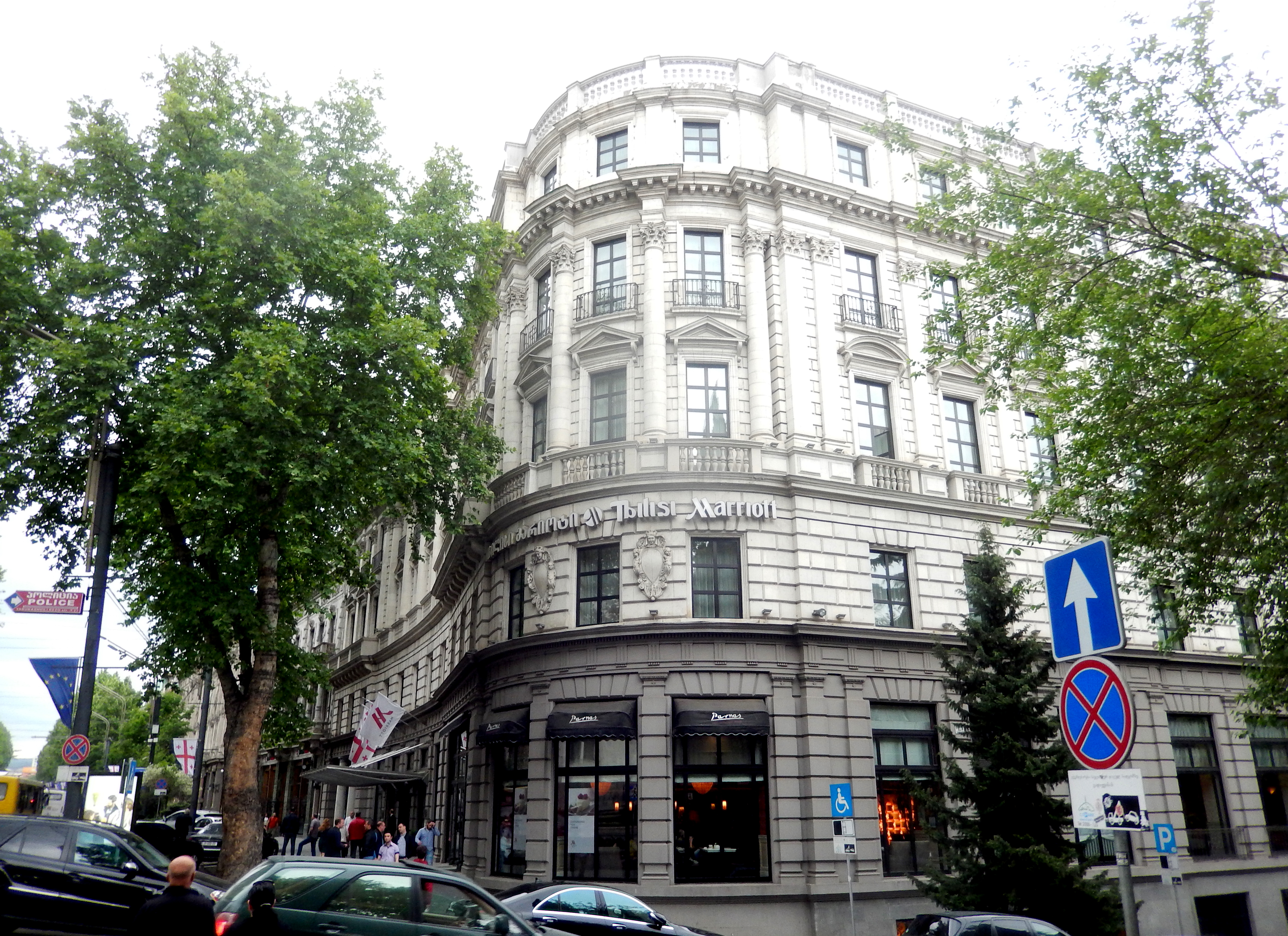
Hotel Tbilisi became, in December 1991, the HQ of the armed opposition.

The Parliament building is entirely isolated, notably because of the preceding cut of all communication cables leading to and from Gamsakhurdia's bunker, a cut that was ordered by the President a few months before under the advice of his National Security Adviser, Otar Khatiashvili. Khatiashvili joins the opposition on the first day of fighting, while Communications Minister Phelix Tkebuchava, stays formally inside the government but collaborates with coup leaders by cutting the phone lines of Parliament.

Throughout the day, rebels managed to enter Parliament twice, but governmental forces push back both times, before asking for a negotiation. The latter soon fails and the battle starts anew, while Sigua contacts Gamsakhurdia and warns him, "Your faults will not happen any longer. You should have resigned a long time ago. Now, you better come out with a white flag or we will take care of everyone."

Besik Kutateladze, the deputy minister of Defense, is sent by Zviad Gamsakhurdia to negotiate again with the opposition, but he betrays the President, joins the opposition and makes a televised declaration asking Gamsakhurdia to resign and to let a new Parliament punish all guilty parties behind the violence. Kutateladze then takes a helicopter and is sent by Sigua and Tengiz Kitovani to Zugdidi, in western Georgia, to prevent the formation of pro-Gamsakhurdia forces. Tamaz Ninua, deputy Foreign Affairs Minister, also joins the opposition.

During the afternoon, Ilia II, Catholicos-Patriarch of the Georgian Orthodox Church, makes an appearance on Rustaveli Avenue, asking both sides to agree on peace, while remaining neutral during the conflict, a position that would later be criticized heavily by some Gamsakhurdia supporters. During the evening, Gamsakhurdia, remaining in his bunker with his family, addressed the nation, pretending that his forces had defeated opposition troops and pledging to not resign. Between seven and 17 people are killed during the first day of battle.

=== Escalation and International Reactions ===
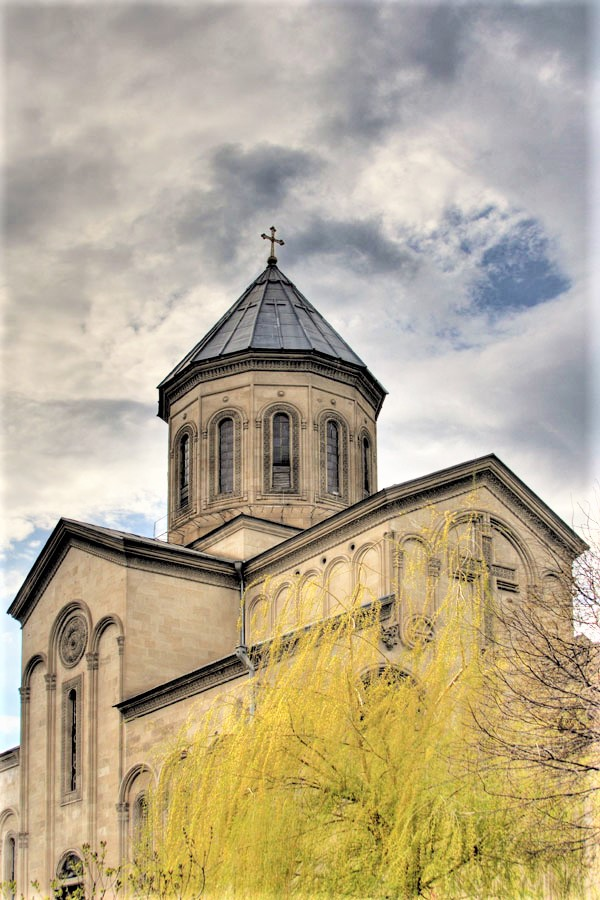
The Kashveti Church becomes a target during the coup.

The conflict intensifies on 23 December during a new direct assault against the Parliament, organized in the morning but rebuffed by the National Guard. During the day, the presidential plane is moved from one side of the Novo Alexeyevka Airport of Tbilisi to another, leading to rumors about a potential departure of Gamsakhurdia; these rumors are, however, denied by the government, which assures that the move is made for security purposes, while announcing a dubious advantage over opposition soldiers. The airport and TV and radio stations are temporarily closed. Russian TV, meanwhile, provides footage of vehicles armed with rocket launchers pointed at the Parliament building, before the beginning of a second attack against the structure, led by Tengiz Sigua himself, who predicts an imminent victory.

The second attack on 23 December results in a temporary victory of the presidential forces, but the Art Museum of Georgia, across the street from the Parliament, catches fire. The Russian press agency TASS writes about the event that several people are stuck inside the museum with no way out, while fire brigades have no access because of the opposition blockade on the street. Gamsakhurdia recalls the remaining parts of his National Guard in Tbilisi in order to attempt a breach through the opposition's barricades outside the city, thus putting an end to any large Georgian military presence in South Ossetia.

According to a New York Times report from Tbilisi, violence increases on 24 December and, while the sounds of missiles thrown against Parliament and the Television Tower of Tbilisi (two kilometers west of Rustaveli Avenue) are heard through the center of the capital, the worsening of the situation leads the U.S. State Department to publish America's first reaction on the Georgian civil war:

We find that President Gamsakhurdia's record on commitment to democratic principles and internationally recognized human rights is poor. Political and other disputes should be resolved peacefully and in a manner consistent with internationally recognized human rights principles. We've called on both the Georgian government and the opposition to observe these principles in resolving their dispute.

While increasing the blockade around Tbilisi, Tengiz Sigua and Tengiz Kitovani offer a peace proposal to Gamsakhurdia on 24 December. The plan offers to treat members of government with safe conduct in exchange of the immediate resignation of the president, an offer refused by the head of state. At the end of the day, some international reports estimated the number of dead between 23 and 50 Georgians and 168 to 200 injured. Russian television shows footage of civilians evacuating the bodies of victims during the evening. On 25 December, the number of dead grows to 30–80 victims, according to US media.

=== The New Year ===
The most severe battle of the coup d'état takes place on 27 December when Tengiz Kitovani's troops penetrate inside the Parliament and put fire to the first floor of the building with gasoline. The Health Ministry announces after during an interview with The New York Times that, "we have no idea what's happening, except for the fact that there are shootings around Parliament." However, this doesn't prevent Human Rights Watch, a US-based NGO, from publishing an official report the same day formally accusing the Zviad Gamsakhurdia government of human rights violations.

On 28 December, it becomes clear that government forces have lost all control outside of the presidential bunker and Tengiz Kitovani, followed by a Mkhedrioni detachment, captures the former Soviet office of the KGB in the Gldani neighborhood, where several opposition leaders are imprisoned. Eight prisoners are freed and brought to Rustaveli Avenue to encourage fighters, including Giorgi Chanturia, Giorgi Khaindrava, and the titular head of the Mkhedrioni, Jaba Ioseliani. The latter takes back his control over the militia and Chanturia announces that the civil war must continue until the resignation of Gamsakhurdia. On their way, the Kitovani troops burn down several buildings of strategic importance, including the National Bank of Georgia and the Ministry of Internal Affairs, leading to the destruction of nearly 210,000 documents (or 80% of the entirety) of governmental archives from the Soviet era.

At the end of 28 December, the number of dead had risen to at least 42, and 260 injured. On 31 December, Nodar Giorgadze, deputy minister of defense and leader of a militia made up of veterans from the Afghanistan War, publicly asks for Gamsakhurdia's resignation, leading to his arrest. He is soon joined by Murman Omanidze, the Foreign Affairs Minister and one of Gamsakhurdia's closest advisers, following his failed negotiating trip to Russia.

=== A Military Council ===
On 1 January 1992, opposition forces capture the Broadcasting Tower of Tbilisi, allowing them to control televised messages. On 2 January 1992, opposition leaders, assembled within the Academy of Sciences, announced the establishment of a Military Council. The Council becomes the only government recognized by members of the opposition. While the complete makeup of the council's administration is never made public, Tengiz Kitovani and Jaba Ioseliani proclaim themselves Council leaders, while nominating Tengiz Sigua as head of government and Prime Minister and the Supreme Council is dissolved. Aleksandre Chikvaidze, the Russian ambassador to the Netherlands, is appointed Foreign Affairs Minister, former Soviet military commissar Levan Sharashenidze is named Minister of Defense, and Vakhtang Razmadze becomes the Chief Prosecutor. Theoretically, the Gamsakhurdia government remains the only legitimate entity recognized by major foreign powers, but it isn't clear which government is recognized by Laos, Ethiopia, and Iraq, which recognize Georgian independence the day of the council's creation.

Kitovani and Ioseliani sign together all the junta's decrees, including a first decree deposing the Gamsakhurdia cabinet, before abolishing the Constitution in a second decree. By ordering such moves, opposition leaders claimed to want to restore the old Democratic Republic of Georgia's 1921 Constitution, but this restoration will only happen in late February and the country operates under the junta's unilateral control for a month. In order to convince the civilian population of the opposition's democratic intentions, the Military Council announces the formation of a consultative assembly made of political and intellectual figures ("open to all, except Zviad Gamsakhurdia").

A curfew is established the same day by the junta across Tbilisi, prohibiting anyone from leaving their homes from 23:00 to 06:00. Zviad Gamsakhurdia, whose troops consist of a just a few hundred guards at this point, asks, from his bunker, the Georgian people to ignore the Military Council's decrees and to follow only "the Constitution, the laws of the Republic and those of its democratically-elected government".

The main battle on 2 January takes place during the evening when, around 18:00, governmental troops attack with trace fire the Iveria Hotel, controlled by the opposition and less than one kilometer north of the Parliament building and which includes a Red Cross station. The opposition retaliates from the Academy of Arts building, leading to a fierce battle on Rustaveli Avenue until 22:00. By the end of 2 January, Gamsakhurdia's Health Ministry counted a total of 73 dead and 400 injured since the beginning of the conflict. Gia Karkarashvili is named military governor of Tbilisi by the Military Council.

=== Events Outside of Tbilisi ===
While Tbilisi falls into chaos, the rest of Georgia (except for South Ossetia) remains more or less calm during the first week of the conflict. However, the events affected some rural zones in January 1992. Thus, while Georgian television falls under opposition control on 1 January, all programming is stopped in western Georgia, which had remained loyal to Gamsakhurdia, thanks to the capture of the broadcasting tower of Kutaisi by Zviadists. In the same manner, while a majority of the country stops receiving newspapers following the closure of printers in Tbilisi during the coup, western Georgia keeps its pro-Gamsakhurdia newspapers thanks to the printers of Kutaisi.

On 4 January, Zviad Gamsakhurdia signs a decree from his bunker requiring all municipal and regional governments outside of Tbilisi to organize a large-scale mobilization of troops against the opposition. This order requires the mobilization to take place until 7 January and mandates the local governments to open mobilization centers to welcome all military conscripts, aged 20 to 45 years old. Local authorities are also under the obligation to organize transport for this theoretical army. However, without a National Guard, this decree cannot be enforced.

In response, the Military Council announces the abolition of local governments and declares its intent to appoint local governors loyal to the opposition. According to an announcement by the council, the majority of local government centers fell into the junta's control by 18:30 on 4 January. However, the country still includes some cities loyal to the President; a gun battle takes place at the Rustavi City Hall, 25 kilometers south of the capital, between the local government and Military Council troops, on 5 January. No injury is reported from this battle.

=== Repressing Demonstrations ===
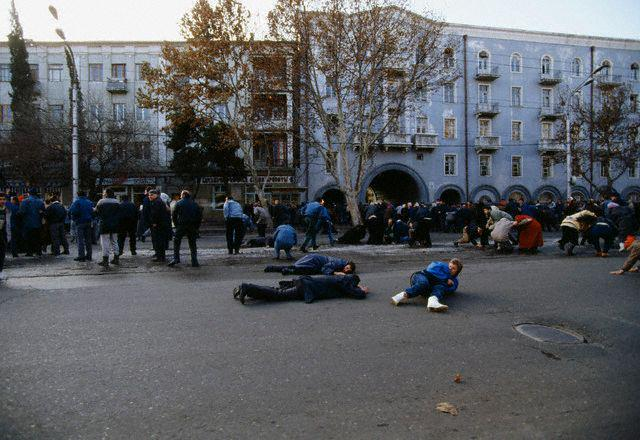
3 January protesters fleeing after an attack by the Military Council. Two were killed instantly and dozens wounded.

On 3 January, it becomes clear that the Gamsakhurdia government has no longer enough forces to defeat the opposition. However, the Western press questions the strength of the opposition, notably because of the bunker's advantageous position, but also because of the lack of any decisive force by either side. Ashot Manucharyan, National Security Adviser to Armenian president Levon Ter-Petrosian, arrives in Tbilisi the same day in order to broker a peace between the adversaries and convince them to sign a peace agreement; however, Gamsakhurdia is offended by the meeting between the Armenian delegation and the opposition.

Zviad Gamsakhurdia states his last speech from his bunker in the morning:

While we have almost achieved the true independence of the republic and her recognition and the world's powers, a few traitors of our homeland are attempting to threaten our independence by creating a Military Council, in the same nature as the revolutionary committee of February 1921. Today, our nation's destiny is to be decided. I ask everyone to rise to defend the homeland, to defend the future of our children. The entire population of our republic has to come to the defense of its legitimate and democratically-elected government. The government is in entire control of the situation and continues to direct the republic's infrastructure. We have overcome many obstacles on the road to independence. We believe that now as well, the Georgian people shall overcome the current situation with honor. I ask you to form defense committees and to resist the decisions of the Military Council. I ask you to organize large demonstrations, many strikes, and other acts of civil disobedience.

While the Military Council issued a new decree forbidding all protestations, an assembly of 3,000 to 4,000 Gamsakhurdia supporters organize a demonstration around 12:00 on 3 January, starting from a railway station several miles from the battlefield. The protesters, including mainly middle-aged men and women, carry the President's portrait, while chanting his name ("Zviadi!") and walking toward Rustaveli Avenue. After just 15 minutes, a car transporting masked men of the Mkhedrioni throws smoke bombs on the crowd, which only angers and energizes it, while encouraging applause from civilians on their balconies. But a group of eight to ten masked men wearing sunglasses to hide their identities, form a line in front of the demonstrators and start shooting blanks to disperse the crowd. A few instants later, real bullets are fired at the protesters, who disperse violently while some take refuge behind cars. Two protesters are immediately killed and several are injured, including two more who would die a few days later.

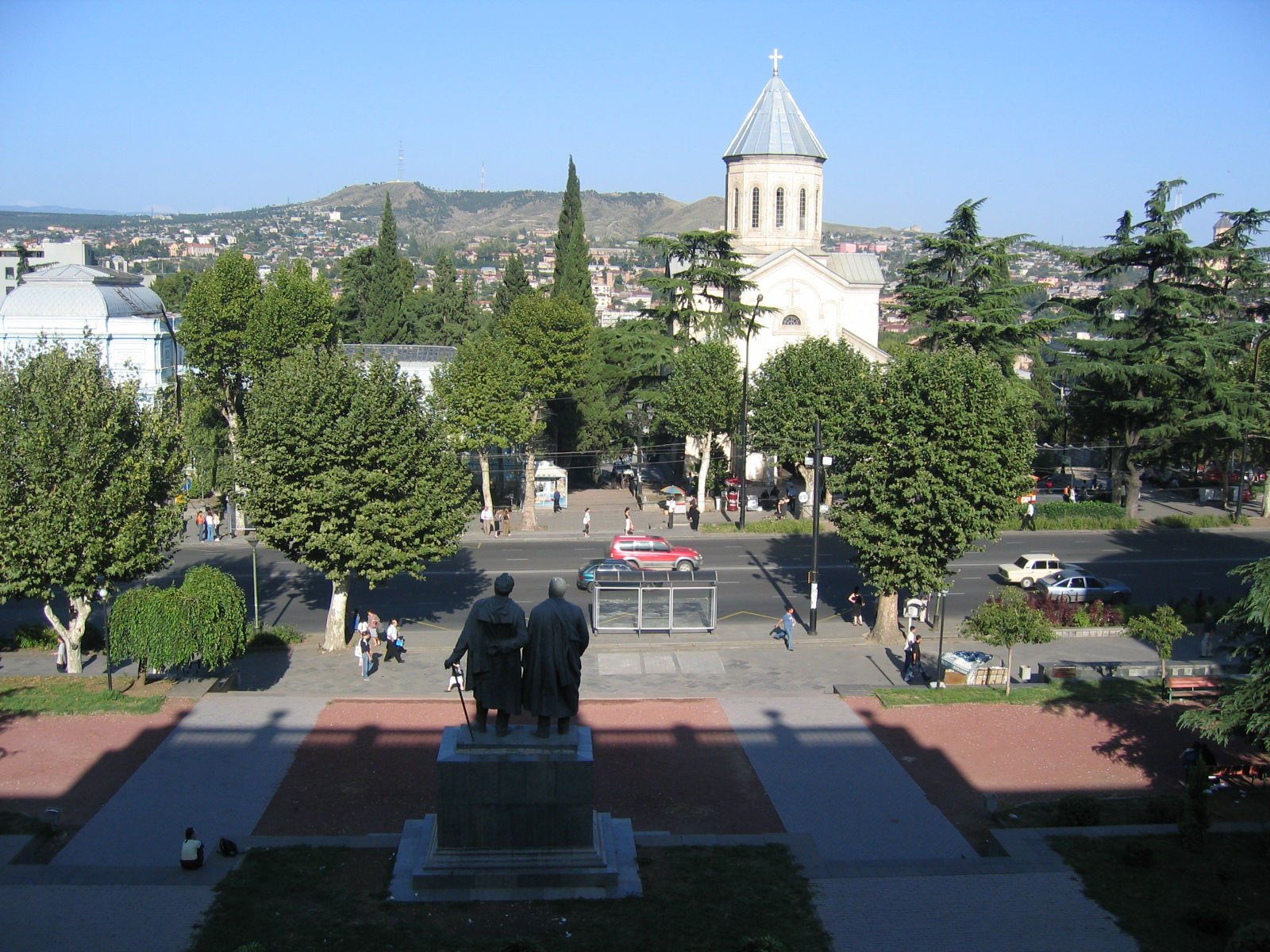
View of Rustaveli Avenue, center of the war.

The events of 3 January increase the rhetoric between both sides. Jaba Ioseliani announces during a press conference that the decision to violently disperse the demonstration came directly from the Military Council, due to the junta's decree banishing all demonstrations. He called the massacre "normal" and threatened to repeat the orders if Tbilisi residents continued to violate the council's decrees, while apologizing to four journalists who had their equipment confiscated by opposition forces. Ioseliani accuses the elite OMON forces of Gamsakhurdia of having provoked the Mkhedrioni soldiers.

Zviad Gamsakhurdia compared, during an interview with British TV station Sky News, the Military Council to "terrorists and criminals" on 4 January. During that same interview, he refused a new offer to negotiate his resignation with the opposition and compared the shooting to the January 1991 events in Lithuania, when Soviet troops shot and killed several protesters fighting for independence.

At 18:00, Sigua announces on television an ultimatum to the President, giving him until 08:00 the next morning to resign. The Military Council temporarily ceases fire and blocks all access to the Parliament building, except for the street behind the building in order to allow Gamsakhurdia soldiers to leave the battlefield. The President refuses the ultimatum while offering a compromise: a serious limitation on executive powers, a referendum on the existence of the president's position, the restoration of South Ossetian autonomy, a return of Meskhetian Turks exiled in Central Asia since the 1940s, the liberation of political prisoners, and membership into the Commonwealth of Independent States. This offer is refused by the opposition, following which Gamsakhurdia declares,

I have tried several times to put an end to the killing, but it seems impossible to discuss with the opposition, as it is only a gang of criminals. The only thing left to do is to fight, fight, and again, fight. Of course, it is not an easy thing to accomplish, but a peaceful solution is only possible if the Georgian society mobilizes itself, and the latter remains passive at the moment. I know that we can defeat the rebellion with our military force, but it will take time.

Gamsakhurdia's refusal leads to tensions within the bunker, escalating when two parties cause a violent brawl due to a disagreement on the follow-up strategy. After shots are fired within the compound, a large part of the fighters leaves the Parliament building and, by 20:00, only 500 guards protect the government. Following false rumors on the executions of Nodar Giorgadze and Jemal Koteliani, two members of the government imprisoned in the bunker by Gamsakhurdia, the Military Council draws up plans to launch a new attack against the Parliament.

=== Last Battles ===
The interior of Parliament was taken by force by opposition soldiers several times.

On 4 January, while Jaba Ioseliani announces a plan to abolish the presidency and institute a parliamentary system in Georgia, the Ministry of Internal Affairs and the Prosecutor General's Office pledge allegiance to the Military Council. In response, governmental forces attack the Prosecutor's office, injuring two but failing to occupy the building. Another combat takes place during the night when pro-Gamsakhurdia troops attempt to take over the television broadcasting tower with grenade-launchers, but fail to win this fight as well. These skirmishes, however, take place while the opposition manages to block all radio transmissions coming from the bunker and ceases fire on the Parliament building to allow troops to flee from the bunker.

Another demonstration of around 2,000 Gamsakhurdia supporters takes place on 5 January, during which protesters listen to speeches in favor of the president, before advancing in the street chanting the head of state's name. While rumors of masked men approaching in cars create tensions within the group, the demonstration takes place peacefully and disperses itself naturally within a few hours.

The same day, the last fighting between the Military Council's forces and those of Gamsakhurdia take place. While the residents leave massively the center of Tbilisi, Tengiz Kitovani wins a new fight on the Zulabashvili Brothers Street, behind the Parliament building, finalizing the surrounding of the last government stronghold. Tengiz Sigua, meanwhile, announces publicly that one of his biggest critiques toward Gamsakhurdia is the latter's hostility toward Russia and predicts that Georgia will rejoin the Commonwealth of Independent States once Gamsakhurdia is gone. On 5 January, Russian newspaper Postfactum publishes an interview with an anonymous presidential guard that accuses the president of having forbidden any escape of his troops, threatening any soldier attempting to flee with execution.

Loyalist troops attempt one last time to take on the Broadcasting Tower of Tbilisi. At 20:12, the Military Council launches a last violent attack on the Parliament building, isolating Zviad Gamsakhurdia. The latter receives then an asylum offer from the Armenian president via telegram. Richard Hovannisian, Caucasian History professor at UCLA, states then that "at this point, we have no idea where Georgian voters stand."

At the end of 5 January, at least 90 dead and 700 injured are recorded by the Ministry of Health, while the Military Council insists that the number of victims goes as high as 200 dead and 900 injured.

=== Gamsakhurdia's departure ===
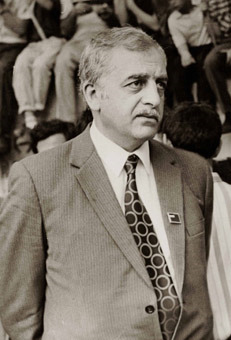
Zviad Gamsakhurdia

On the morning of 6 January, around 05:00, Zviad Gamsakhurdia, his family, and a personal guard of 60 dignitaries and bodyguards leave the Parliament through the road behind the building, the only way out left open by opposition troops in order to control the presidential escape and prevent a dispersion of armed Gamsakhurdia supporters across the capital. The president and his family leave in the presidential car, a Mercedes-Benz, and, followed by an all-terrain vehicle, a minibus, and two Zhigulis, escape a roadblock installed along the Mtkvari river by Giorgi Shengelia, Vakhtang Kikabadze, and Giorgi Khaindrava. Opposition forces penetrate then into the abandoned and ruined Parliament, some supporting columns of which are entirely destroyed. Some Ikarus buses leave the Parliament with loyalist troops shortly after the president's departure, but these do not manage to leave the city in time and are caught in an ambush on Leselidze Street, during which six loyalist soldiers are executed by orders of Karkarashvili. Those that remained inside the Parliament building, led by interim Parliament chairman Nemo Burchuladze, are captured. A last fight takes place in the western part of Tbilisi, near the Murkhatberdani Cemetery, in the afternoon. Once calm is restored, an anti-mining squad is sent into the bunker to clean the area.

According to opposition forces, Zviad Gamsakhurdia left Tbilisi with some 700 million rubles from the state treasury. In exile, Zviad Gamsakhurdia crosses the Azerbaijani border at 09:20 and, escorted by 12 vehicles, arrives in Gandzha at 12:15. Helicopters are deployed by the Military Council to search for the fleeing President, while Tengiz Kitovani spreads false rumors about the capture of Gamsakhurdia by Azerbaijani authorities, rumors soon denied by the Military Council's Ministry of Defense. While some reports show that the exiled Georgians are attempting to reach Baku before crossing the Russian border into Daghestan, Gamsakhurdia ends up in the Armenian town of Idzhevan, in northern Armenia, with a following of 150, in the evening. Kitovani and Sigua sign then a declaration announcing the fall of the "dictatorship" and several soldiers are seen celebrating on the fallen Parliament's steps.

In Tbilisi, the center of the city is entirely destroyed. The Ministry of Communications, the Tbilisi Hotel, the National Art Gallery, the Rustaveli Avenue Cinema, and other national emblems are ruined, while the Artists' House is full of bullet holes and even houses a rocket that never exploded and that would stay on site for several days. Rustaveli Avenue itself is filled with broken windows, fallen trees, and burnt cars. The Metekhi Bridge, the main communication point between both sides of the Mtkvari river, is set on fire by Mkhedrioni soldiers.

Eduard Shevardnadze, former communist leader of Georgia and last Minister of Foreign Affairs of the Soviet Union, announces his intention to return to Georgia in order to assist the Military Council and, according to American geopolitical analyst Thomas L. Friedman, "the George H. W. Bush administration didn't know what to say, and so they said nothing." At the end of the conflict, official estimates show 90 dead and hundreds of injured, but contemporary MIA sources now show the total number of dead to be 113 Georgians.

== In the Bunker ==
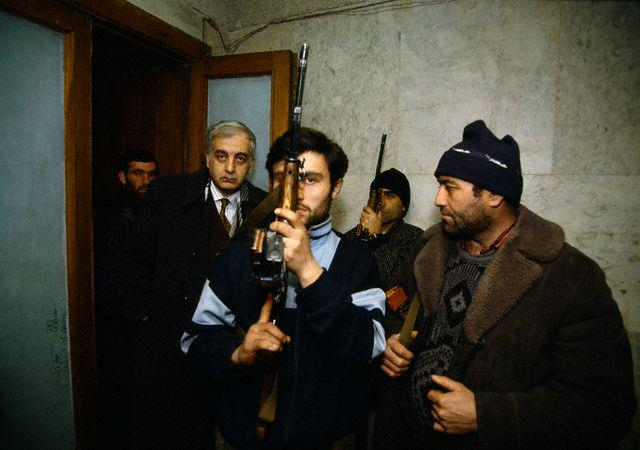
Gamsakhurdia and his guard in his bunker

During the coup, the Zviad Gamsakhurdia government continues to assemble inside the bunker. Almost the entire cabinet is present, as well as a majority of members of Parliament. The latter continues to function in an official manner, despite the absence of its chairman, Akaki Asatiani. On 2 January, the present members vote to require the presence of Asatiani in the bunker, giving him a deadline of 11:00 on 4 January, a deadline ignored by Asatiani, who instead asks for Gamsakhurdia's resignation.

Inside the bunker, conditions are deplorable. One fighter described the bunker during the conflict as "unsanitary". In order to prevent the spread of dysentery, soldiers are given regularly a cocktail of medications, while the poor food rations are described as "bad". Aggravating the sanitary conditions, dead soldiers are amassed in the bunker and, after Gamsakhurdia's departure, the Military Council reveals a room with dozens of corpses.

Under these conditions, some witnesses note that Zviad Gamsakhurdia's personality changed drastically. Murman Omanidze, his minister of Foreign Affairs, described him as "detached from everything, because of the massive stress befallen on his shoulders.

Opposition prisoners are jailed in cells created specifically for the conflict and are under the supervision of the minister of trade. The Military Council claims after the coup that two prisoners were executed inside the bunker, but this claim was never verified by international press. On 3 January, Tengiz Kitovani claims being in possession of a video proving that children from a local orphanage were taken by force into the bunker to serve as unwilling hostages and prevent any violent attack by the opposition, a claim denied by Gamsakhurdia.

== City Conditions ==
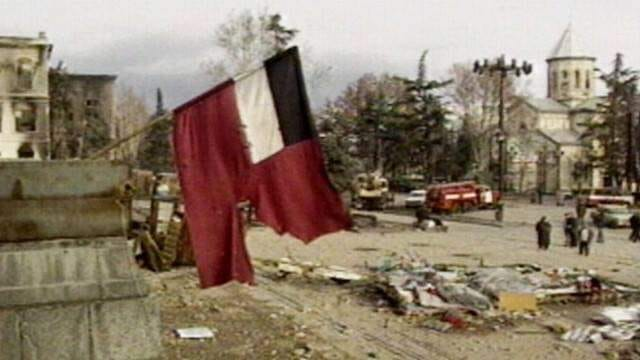
View of Rustaveli Avenue after the conflict

Tbilisi, the largest city in the Caucasus, suffers largely during the coup. According to Murman Omanidze's testimony and Russian media coverage, 80% of the downtown area's building are destroyed in the battle, leading to a large number of refugees. The Red Cross establishes a station in the Iveria Hotel, less than 900 meters from the Parliament building, and a volunteer rescue service called Santeli (სანთელი, "candle") is formed to aid civilians affected by the conflict. The level of criminality increases considerably during the two weeks of the conflict, with a large number of robberies and carjackings. In some cases, armed men form roadblocks and force drivers to empty their gas tanks. Moreover, the Military Council claims that gangs of armed partisans of Gamsakhurdia terrorize the population several times, a claim that the Russian newspaper Postfactum cannot confirm.

Gia Karkarashvili is appointed as military governor of Tbilisi on 2 January, in charge of preserving peace within the capital. A state of emergency is proclaimed starting at 00:00 on 3 January and Karkarashvili forms a militia to patrol the streets before the state police, neutral during the first half of the conflict, takes over on 5 January following the appointment by the Military Council of the popular police chief Roman Gvantsadze as Minister of Internal Affairs.

Karkarashvili's militia imposes strict rules on the population. A curfew prohibits anyone in the street at nighttime, while the Military Council-declared state of emergency authorizes the paramilitary group to arrest anyone walking in the street to inspect their identification documents, to testify as they are Gamsakhurdia supporters or not. Only Tbilisi residents are allowed to stay within the city for more than 24 hours during the conflict, while others are given a one-day permit.

Daily services are also largely affected. While the subterranean metro continues to function normally, other public transportation means are interrupted. An economic crisis affects Tbilisi as shopping centers are closed and markets lose supplies due to farmers remaining in the countryside. Moreover, several neighborhoods suffer from electricity shortages. The Tbilisi airport is mined.

Phone lines, cut as soon as the coup began by the Ministry of Communications, are reestablished on 4 January by the Military Council. During this time, newspapers stop being printed due to fears of attacks by pro-Gamsakhurdia partisans. Postal offices and telegraphic stations are closed as well.

On 9 January, Military Council Prime Minister Tengiz Sigua held a press conference where he detailed the total damages caused by the coup d'état. According to him, a total of 10,000 square meters of housing were burnt down, leading to 252 families (759 people) becoming homeless, for which two hotels, two sanatoriums, and some state-owned dachas outside of Tbilisi were set aside as temporary housing. The total cost of the damages was estimated to be between 500 million and 1 billion rubles.

== After the Coup ==
=== Continuing the Fight ===
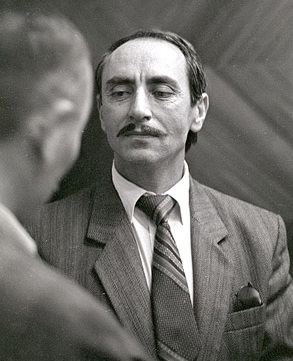
Dzhokhar Dudayev, President of Ichkeria, welcomes Gamsakhurdia in Grozny.

On 7 January, Zviad Gamsakhurdia proclaims his government to be in exile, insisting that his legitimacy remains valid and the coup cannot be recognized by the international community. However, this claim is soon rejected by the Military Council, whose legal counsel, Ron Migrauli, writes an op-ed for the daily "Free Georgia" claiming that an armed revolution against a dictatorship, even if elected and recognized by the international community, must be legitimate by international law.

In order to demonstrate their support over the deposed president, a crowd of several hundreds of protesters demonstrate in the streets of Tbilisi the same day, ignoring the Military Council's decrees. Jaba Ioseliani orders his troops to intimidate the crowd by shooting blanks, dispersing the demonstration and injuring two. Several volunteers in Tbilisi and Mingrelia, Gamsakhurdia's native region, begin to organize and recruit armed supports to plan a counter-attack.

Vakhtang Razmadze, the junta's appointed prosecutor, sends a delegation made of Alexandre Kasvadze, Giorgi Shengelia, Deputy Prosecutor Revaz Kipiani, and Deputy Internal Affairs Minister Givi Kvantaliani to Armenia in order to negotiate a peaceful return of the exiled president to Georgia, offering a promise of freedom in exchange of an end to his presidential claims, a proposal refused by Gamsakhurdia. On 13 January, a second delegation, chaired by Eldar Shengelia and including Chabua Amirejibi, Grigol Lortkipanidze, Giorgi Khaindrava, Vakhtang Kikabadze, and Rivaz Kipiani, go to Yerevan to meet with Armenian president Levon Ter-Petrosyan and National Assembly chair Babken Ararktsyan. However, the latter two refuse to extradite Gamsakhurdia. Lortkipanidze, one of the Georgian delegates, pens a letter signed by a dozen members of the Tbilisi intelligentsia asking for solidarity from the Armenian intelligentsia. Tengiz Kitovani went ahead to claim that "His [Gamsakhurdia's] return may provoke civil war in Georgia and in that case the Armenian leadership will share the blame".

The same day, Zviad Gamsakhurdia and his family take a private plane with a Georgian pilot and leave Armenia for Grozny, the capital of Ichkeria, whose president, Dzhokhar Dudayev, still recognized the legitimacy of the government in exile. Two fighter jets, sent by the Military Council, attempt to force the plane down, but fail.

=== Consequences ===
==== Change of Power ====
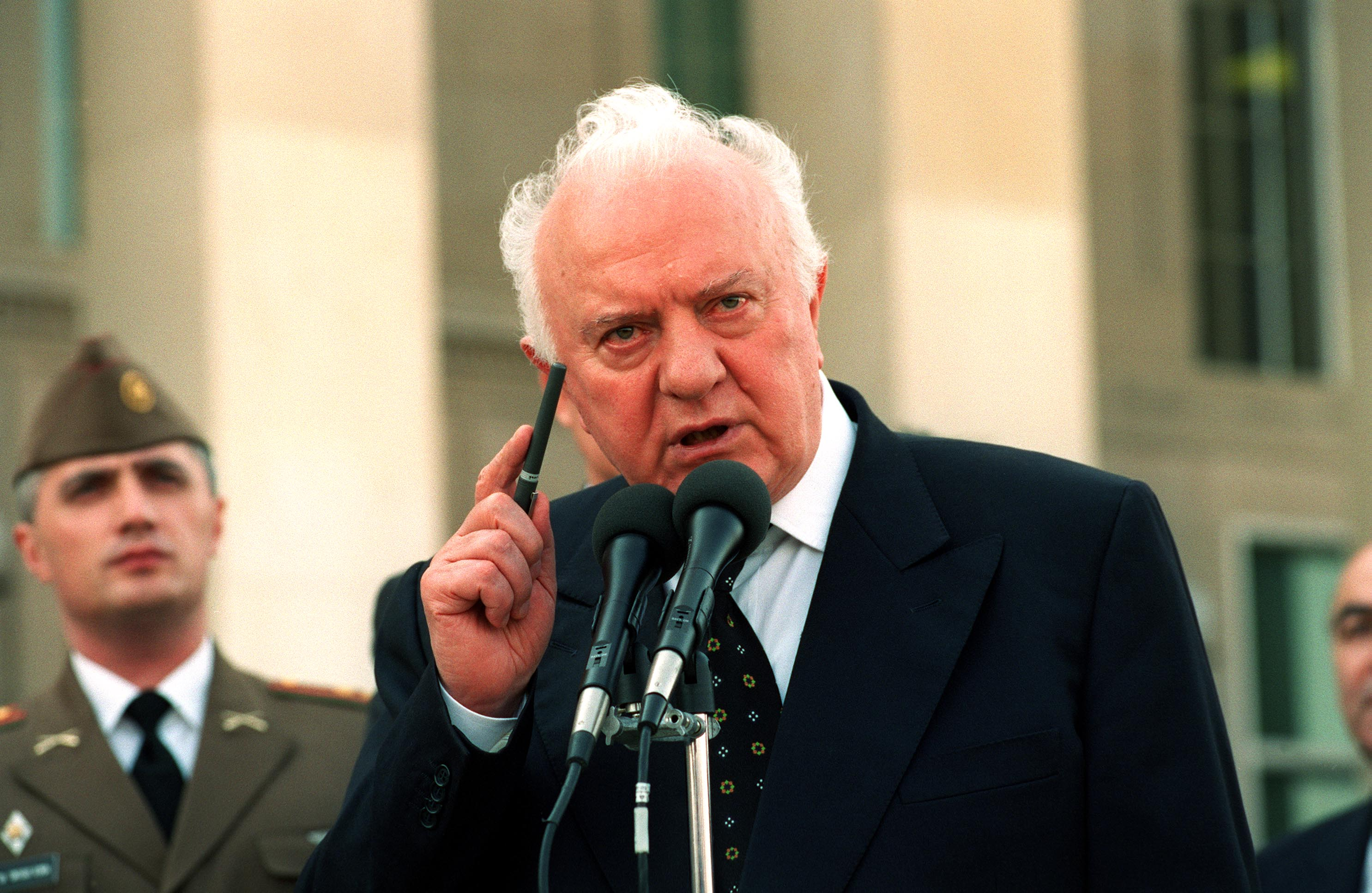
Eduard Shevardnadze became the head of the Georgian state as soon as March 1992.

Besides the temporary destruction of the downtown district of Tbilisi and the death of more than one hundred Georgians, the consequences of the December 1991–January 1992 civil conflict will be felt throughout the 1990s. The Military Council, in power in Tbilisi for another two months, creates an authoritarian and military regime across the country, until the arrival of Eduard Shevardnadze in March. The latter, who had already announced his support of the opposition and his offer to come to Georgia's aid since 5 January, becomes the new head of state and has to spend several years to establish his central power, facing the militaristic ambitions of both Tengiz Kitovani and Jaba Ioseliani. It's only in 1995 that the next presidential elections are held and formalize Shevardnadze's leadership.

==== Civil War ====
Gamsakhurdia's departure marks only the beginning of a civil war that would plunge Georgia into chaos until 1994. After a few months, Gamsakhurdia returns to Georgia through Abkhazia, setting up camp in Zugdidi, Mingrelia's regional capital. After having expelled the new central government's forces, Gamsakhurdia and his supporters, who are called "Zviadists", establish an opposing government in Western Georgia, pushing Mingrelia into a civil war until his death on 31 December 1993. Throughout the 1990s, Mingrelia would become the target of violent political persecutions orchestrated by the Mkhedrioni militia to fight against the remaining Zviadists.

==== Defeat in South Ossetia ====
An even more direct consequence is the situation unveiling in South Ossetia during the conflict. While the region is in the midst of a war against the Ossetian separatists, the coup gives the rebels the opportunity to strengthen their position. Gamsakhurdia and his opposition recall one after the other their Georgian militias stationed in South Ossetia, giving a clear advantage to Ossetian soldiers. (Note: A referendum on South Ossetian independence is organized on 19 January 1992 while Georgian authorities failed to intervene to put an end to the process.) On 4 January, Tengiz Epitashvili, the presidential representative in the South Ossetian conflict, joins the Military Council and pledges to keep his last National Guard bastions in place to protect Georgian territories; but the same day, opposition leaders offer a ceasefire and a peace proposal to the separatists. As a show of good faith, Kitovani and Ioseliani free Torez Kulumbegov, the former Soviet leader of the South Ossetian Autonomous Oblast imprisoned by Gamsakhurdia during the beginning of the Ossetian rebellion, on 5 January.

This opening is, however, ignored by the Ossetians and the self-proclaimed Supreme Soviet of South Ossetia announces a general mobilization of all men aged 18 to 60 to use the Georgian setback at their advantage. A defense committee made of ten mobile units is formed on 5 January to defend Tskhinvali and attack Georgian positions.

During that winter, Ossetians capture all of Tskhinvali and several villages. Moreover, they use the instability in Georgia to hold the referendum on secession from Georgia, although Georgian population of the region is unable to participate and the referendum is not recognized by the new Georgian government. The separatists' victory would be confirmed during a ceasefire signed by Shevardnadze in June 1992. As of today, South Ossetia remains under the separatists' control, although internationally mostly unrecognized. (Note: The Republic of South Ossetia is only recognized by Russia, Nicaragua, Venezuela, Nauru, and Syria.)

== Analysis ==
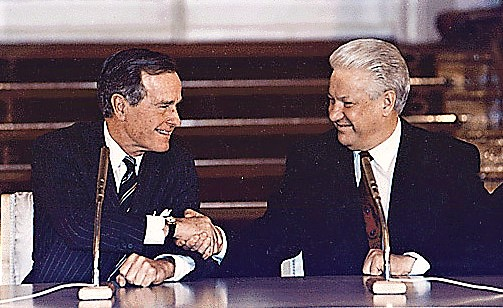
George H. W. Bush (left) and Boris Yeltsin (right).

The Tbilisi War remains a difficult memory for much of the capital's population. Rustaveli Avenue's destruction is represented by these words told by a civilian during a special report by The New York Times:

You need to understand, Rustaveli was where we used to play hooky from school, where we'd take a girlfriend on a nice walk. It was the heart of Tbilisi. We saw the scenes on television, but we had no idea that it was this bad.

Serge Schmemann, who covered the post-Soviet world for The New York Times, talks of a Georgian tragedy that forced "Georgian national heroes against Georgian national heroes." Thomas L. Friedman, a US geopolitical journalist, talks of the coup d'état as the onset of a decisive change in the United States' interventionist politics following the fall of the USSR:

The coup d'état is at the heart of the next great debate on America's foreign policy... The question is, are these new democrats mocking themselves, or are they mocking us? It's clear the George H. W. Bush administration saw through Gamsakhurdia.

The American reaction toward the putsch shocked several Georgians who had been convinced that the United States represented Russia's geopolitical alternative. However, it soon becomes clear that Washington sees Boris Yeltsin's Russia as a potential ally in the new post-Soviet world and for that reason, U.S. secretary of state James Baker, who often criticized human rights violations made by Gamsakhurdia, ignored the same violations done under Eduard Shevardnadze, even supporting and advising the latter's presidency. Gamsakhurdia himself in 1992 accused Bush and Yeltsin working together against his government, while denouncing James Baker for directly participating in the coup.

Murman Omanidze, Minister of Foreign Affairs of Gamsakhurdia who fled Tbilisi after being accused of treason during the revolt, analyzes while in Moscow that the coup is not a conflict between the government and its opposition, but rather between different factions of the same party:

The popular version that this conflict is between the opposition and the Georgian President's partisans is incorrect. The fight is between the members of the coalition on top of the Republic... The dozens of true opposition parties are not participating in the conflict and prefer to wait before expressing themselves on the subject.

On 11 March 2005, the Georgian Parliament adopted a resolution calling the 1991–1992 events a "violent and anti-constitutional military coup". In 2008, Georgian president Mikheil Saakashvili accused Tengiz Kitovani of operating as a Russian "agent" during the civil conflict.

According to 2020 poll by the Caucasus Research Resource Centers, 76% of Georgians think that the coup was a bad thing for Georgia.

== See also ==
- Georgian Civil War
- Military Council (Georgia)
- Zviad Gamsakhurdia
- Tengiz Kitovani
- Tengiz Sigua
- Jaba Ioseliani
- Mkhedrioni

== Notes and references ==
=== Bibliography ===
- Asatiani, Nodar; Janelidze, Otar (2009). History of Georgia. Tbilissi: Publishing House Petite. ISBN 978-9941906367.
- Dawisha, Karen; Parrott, Bruce (1994). Russia and the New States of Eurasia. New York: Cambridge University Press.
- Demetriou, Spyros (November 2002). Politics from the Barrel of a Gun: Small Arms Proliferation and Conflict in the Republic of Georgia (1989–2001). Geneva: The Small Arms Survey.
- "Conflict in Georgia – Human Rights Violations by the Government of Zviad Gamsakhurdia". Helsinki Watch. Human Rights Watch. 27 December 1991.
- Jones, Stephen (2013). Georgia: A Political History Since Independence. London: I.B. Tauris. ISBN 978-1784530853.
- Tsomaia, Leila (2018). პრეზიდენტ ზვიად გამსახურდიას ხელისუფლების დამხობა [The Overthrow of the Freedom of President Zviad Gamsakhurdia] (in Georgian). Tbilissi. ISBN 978-9941805134.
- Wheatley, Jonathan (2005). Georgia from National Awakening to Rose Revolution: Delayed Transition in the Former Soviet Union. Ashgate Publishing, Ltd. ISBN 0754645037.
