= State Council of the Republic of Georgia =

Temporary 1992 governing body of Georgia

Republic of Georgia საქართველოს რესპუბლიკა (Georgian)
- 1992
- Flag Coat of arms
- Motto: ძალა ერთობაშია Dzala ertobashia "Strength is in Unity"
- Anthem: დიდება Dideba "Glory"
- Capital: Tbilisi
- Official languages: Georgian
- Demonym: Georgian
- Government: Provisional government
  - Chairman: Eduard Shevardnadze
- Legislature: State Council
- Historical era: Post-Soviet era
  - Formation: 10 March 1992
  - Accession to the United Nations: 31 July 1992
  - Parliament of Georgia elected: 11 October 1992
  - Dissolution: 6 November 1992

Area
  - Total: 69,700 km^{2} (26,900 sq mi)
- Currency: Soviet ruble (maneti) (RUB)
- Time zone: GET
- Calling code: +7 882/883
- ISO 3166 code: GE
Preceded by	Succeeded by
Military Council	Republic of Georgia
- Today part of: Georgia (Note: Including de facto republics of Abkhazia and South Ossetia)

State Council of the Republic of Georgia (Georgian: საქართველოს რესპუბლიკის სახელმწიფო საბჭო, romanized: sakartvelos resp'ublik'is sakhelmts'ipo sabch'o) was a temporary supreme governing body of the country, which was established in 1992 after the self-liquidation of the Military Council of the Republic of Georgia.

== History ==
In 1992, the first president of Georgia, Zviad Gamsakhurdia, was overthrown by insurgents through a military coup. The rebels formed a temporary structure, a military council, and established an authoritarian and military regime in the country. On January 5, Eduard Shevardnadze offered to help the country. He arrived in Georgia on March 7, 1992. It was at this time that the temporary structure of governing the country began to be developed. It was this structure that was to lead the country until the next parliamentary elections. The working version of the name of the structure was "Civil Salvation Committee". After consultations and analysis, the final name of the structure was chosen as the "State Council".

On March 10, the Military Council handed over power to the State Council of the Republic of Georgia and self-liquidated. At the first meeting of the initial composition of the State Council, the full composition of the members was determined on the basis of a broad coalition consensus (through consultations with political parties). On March 10, Eduard Shevardnadze was approved as the Chairman of the State Council. Jaba Ioseliani was approved as his deputy. The Presidium of the State Council of the Republic of Georgia was established. The first meeting of the State Council of the Republic of Georgia was held on March 11. The State Council reorganized and reunited the army. The Ministry of Security was replaced by an intelligence service that had limited interception of citizens. The council demanded the registration of all weapons and the nationalization of Soviet military property, although the Russian army ignored the council's request and sold or destroyed equipment that could not be delivered in Russia. On August 2, the Council of State issued a "Manifesto of Reconciliation" and pardoned all political prisoners detained from January to June 1992, although Gamsakhurdia was not pardoned. The council lifted the state of emergency in Tbilisi in August.

On October 16, before self-liquidation, the State Council passed an election law requiring parliamentary elections and the formation of a three-year transitional parliament.
