= Zviadists =

Supporters of Zviad Gamsakhurdia during the 1991-1993 Georgian Civil War

- ზვიადისტები
- Leaders: Loti Kobalia; Akaki Eliava; Gocha Esebua; Badri Zarandia
- Dates active: December 1991–mid-2000s
- Country: (Georgia (country)) Georgia
- Allegiance: Zviad Gamsakhurdia
- Headquarters: Zugdidi
- Ideology: Georgian nationalism Anti-communism
- Size: ~2,200

Zviadists was an informal name of supporters of the former Georgian President Zviad Gamsakhurdia, who was overthrown and killed during the Georgian Civil War of 1991–1993.

First President of Georgia Zviad Gamsakhurdia was ousted in a bloody coup that destroyed the center of Tbilisi between 22 December 1991 and 6 January 1992, forcing Gamsakhurdia to flee to neighboring Chechnya. Zviad Gamsakhurdia's supporters, the Zviadists staged mass demonstrations against the post-coup government led by the former Soviet Georgian leader Eduard Shevardnadze in various parts of Georgia and organized armed groups which prevented the government forces from taking control of Samegrelo, the ex-President's home province. Skirmishes between pro- and anti-Gamsakhurdia forces lasted throughout 1992 and 1993 and developed into a full-scale civil war with Gamsakhurdia's return to Western Georgia in September 1993. Zviadist rebels were defeated by November 1993 and Gamsakhurdia was probably murdered on 31 December 1993.

Gamsakhurdia's body was recovered and his death was confirmed on 17 February 1994.

After Gamsakhurdia's death, some Zviadists moved to underground resistance in Western Georgia, especially Mingrelia. Zviadists never created a single party, but some of them joined various political organizations and social movements, while others continued to fight Eduard Shevardnadze's government.

== History ==
=== After Gamsakhurdia's death ===
After the civil war, Mingrelia remained a stronghold of the Zviadists. Many Mingrelians were alienated from the government of Eduard Shevardnadze because of the reprisals conducted against the population of the region during the civil war by the paramilitaries supporting Shevardnadze, including Jaba Ioseliani's Mkhedrioni. Shevardnadze and his government, on the other hand, remained suspicious of Mingrelians. Mingrelians did not develop separatist tendencies, but the trauma of the recent conflict distanced them from other Georgians.

After Gamsakhurdia's death, many Zviadists continued their political activities and faced repression and harassment by the authorities. In 1994, several opposition demonstrations were dispersed by the police, and Zviadist political prisoners were subject to torture and violations of due process. In December 1993, the criminal proceedings were initiated against the Zviadist newspapers Iberia-Spektr and Sakartvelos Samreklo, with their publications being halted. Mingrelia was put under the state of emergency in October 1993 and remained so until 5 October 1994, when the Provisional Committee for Emergency Situations in Western Georgia was abolished by Eduard Shevardnadze. In 1996 and 1997, the Zviadists held demonstrations to mark the independence day, but were violently suppressed by the police. In contrast, the demonstration on 31 March 1998 on the independence referendum day, proceeded without any incidents.

In November 1996, Loti Kobalia, the commander of the Zviadist paramilitary forces during the civil war, was sentenced to death for "high treason, banditry, and the commission of premeditated murders". The former parliamentary deputies Jambul Bokuchava, Zviad Dzidziguri, and Nugzar Molodinashvili were also sentenced on similar charges. The defendants argued in the court that they were defending the "lawful state power against its usurpation by Eduard Shevardnadze".

The Presidium of the Georgian Supreme Council, overthrown in 1992, continued to hold meetings abroad and functioned as the government-in-exile. The Supreme Council declared the 1995 elections in Georgia as "null and void". The Zviadist diaspora formed in the Baltic countries, Russia and Finland, with the latter officially granting Zviadists political asylum. However, the Zviadist diaspora did not exercise much power, and they mostly focused on financial support to Zviadist prisoners in Georgia, spread of information about the prisoners to the international human rights organizations, and financial support to Zviadist newspapers.

Some Zviadists joined various political and social movements to oppose the government of Eduard Shevardnadze and took part in the elections. In 1998, when the strongman governor of Adjarian Autonomous Republic Aslan Abashidze went into opposition to President Shevardnadze and began forming the anti-Shevardnadze bloc under the leadership of his Revival party, small fragments of the Zviadist movement joined the coalition and took part in the 1999 Georgian parliamentary election, which resulted in the coalition gaining 25% of the vote and 59 seats in the Georgian parliament.

Other Zviadists continued the armed resistance against the government of Eduard Shevardnadze. On 9 February 1998, armed attackers with a grenade launcher and a machine gun ambushed the motorcade of President Shevardnadze in Tbilisi in a failed assassination attempt, which resulted in the death of one attacker and one bodyguard of Shevardnadze. On 16 February, the Georgian authorities arrested five Zviadists accused of orchestrating the assassination attempt, while searching for two others. Chechen militant Salman Raduyev claimed responsibility for the attack, and indeed, in April 1997 Raduyev promised to liberate Georgia from "the Shevardnadze's regime". However, later the Georgian security forces claimed they found no evidence of Raduyev's involvement in the attack. Later on Shevardnadze blamed Russia for the assassination attempt, and in particular former Minister of State Security of Georgia Igor Giorgadze, who was charged with the previous assassination attempt against Shevardnadze on 29 August 1995 and fled to Russia.

On 19 February 1998, four United Nations observers and other hostages were taken captive by Zviadists in Jikhashkari, Mingrelia. The leader of the Zviadist group was Gocha Esebua, the officer in the National Guard of Georgia under President Gamsakhurdia. He stated that their aim was to attract attention regarding the Zviadist prisoners arrested by the government of Shevardnadze. Despite this, the hostages were treated well, with the Zviadists inviting hostages to the feast and drinking wine and making toasts with them. On 26 February, the Zviadists surrendered, with Esebua and others being allowed to escape by the authorities. However, on 1 April, Gocha Esebua was killed in a gun battle with the police near Zugdidi.

On 17 and 18 March 1998, the Russian authorities raided the Zviadist "information center" in Moscow and arrested former Georgian Finance Minister Guram Absandze and former Georgian Vice-chairman of Supreme Council Nemo Burchuladze, with them being extradited to Georgia. Georgia ramped up accusations against Russia for "harboring international terrorists" before the arrests, and some analysts reported that the extraditions might have been a move "to secure Shevardnadze's attendance at the CIS summit scheduled for March 19".

On 19 October 1998, 200 soldiers of the Georgian army staged a mutiny against the government of Shevardnadze under the leadership of Lieutenant-Colonel Akaki Eliava, a former Zviadist officer who was amnistied in 1994 and coopted into the army. Akaki Eliava and Nemo Burchuladze issued a joint statement during the mutiny, saying that they were "restoring legitimate power in Georgia". The mutiny began in the Senaki military base in Mingrelia, with the soldiers advancing to Kutaisi, second largest Georgian city. They also took captive some security officials. However, the mutineers were soon met by much larger government force under the command of Defence Minister Davit Tevzadze, and Mingrelia also remained tranquil. After this, the mutineers agreed to return to the barracks. Shevardnadze accused the mutineers of attempting to sabotage the construction of Baku–Supsa Pipeline to transport Caspian oil through Georgia. Eliava, who managed to escape, demanded the resignation of Eduard Shevardnadze and the restoration of the "legal government" formed by Gamsakhurdia. Akaki Eliava continued issuing ultimatums to Shevardnadze. On 3 November, he demanded the release of those 34 prisoners arrested after the mutiny and the official condemnation of the 1991–1992 Georgian coup d'état, threatening another military campaign against Shevardnadze.

Shevardnadze officially adopted the policy of "reconciliation" with Zviadists. The Speaker of the Georgian Parliament Zurab Zhvania said in 1998 that it was desirable that all Zviadists "return from the forests". Shevardnadze even recognized the guilt of the authorities for the events that took place during the civil war in Mingrelia. In 1997, Eduard Shevardnadze pardoned 52 convicts on death row, including Zviadists. However, in practice "a witch-hunt for dissidents" continued in Georgia. On 12 May 1998, the president of the All-Georgian Human Rights Association, Giorgi Kervalishvili reported that there were more than 100 Zviadist political prisoners in Georgia.

In 2000, after the 9 April presidential election, the Parliament of Georgia passed a "resolution on national reconciliation" which directed the Prosecutor's Office of Georgia to review the cases of Zviadists convicted for the participation in the civil war. Shevardnadze pardoned several hundred prisoners, with the estimated 95% of Zviadists being released from prison. The court also released two Zviadists accused of an assassination attempt against the Mkhedrioni paramilitary leader Jaba Ioseliani in 1992. However, not all prisoners were pardoned, and on 1 October 2000, 12 Zviadists staged a prison break in Tbilisi, including Loti Kobalia, whose death sentence was replaced by life imprisonment, and Guram Absanadze, who was charged with organizing and financing the 1998 assassination attempt. Three escapees, Absanadze, Kobalia and Zaur Edzhibia, were apprehended in the Ambrolauri Municipality on 11 October. The scandal discredited the Justice Ministry which led to the resignation of Minister Joni Khetsuriani, who was replaced by Mikheil Saakashvili.

The Parliament of Georgia set up the Parliamentary Commission for National Reconciliation with the purpose of assessing the violence in Tbilisi in 1991-1992 that culminated in Gamsakhurdia's ouster. In a move to placate the unfavorable parts of the population, especially after the accusations of electoral fraud emerged against Shevardnadze, on 20 April 2000 the Georgian Parliament passed the resolution "On Eliminating the Consequences of the 1991-1992 Civil Conflicts and Seeking National Reconciliation", which described the overthrow of Gamsakhurdia as the "unlawful act of overthrowing the legitimate authorities". Although Shevardnadze was invited to lead the country in 1992 following the overthrow of Gamsakhurdia, the coup leaders, Tengiz Kitovani and Jaba Ioseliani, were arrested by Shevardnadze in 1995 for opposition to his regime. Ioseliani was granted amnesty in May 2000 along with 278 other prisoners by Shevardnadze following his re-election.

Despite these developments, on 9 July 2000, the Georgian security forces assassinated Akaki Eliava near Zestaponi, and situation in Mingrelia remained unstable. Mingrelian parliamentary deputy Anzor Abralava from the Revival party, along with four other deputies, resigned from the Parliamentary Commission for National Reconciliation after the assassination, saying that the killing "has put an end to the national reconciliation process".

In April 2002, Shevardnadze pardoned Guram Absandze. On 28 October, the anniversary of the 1990 Georgian Supreme Soviet election, which brought Gamsakhurdia to power, Absandze founded the Union of National Concord and Justice party.

In mid-2003, two armed groups were vying for the leadership of Zviadists: the Association of Georgian Patriots, founded by Badri Zarandia, and another group led by a local personality, Nachkebia. They were allegedly involved in the smuggling of petrol, cigarettes, scrap metal, and vegetable nuts, along with other guerrilla bands operating in Mingrelia. Badri Zarandia was a former commander in Zugdidi under Gamsakhurdia. He was arrested on 20 October 1994 and sentenced to death in connection to the 1993 uprising, and was included in the list of political prisoners by the Amnesty International. In January 1997, the Georgian Supreme Court changed his death sentence to 15 years imprisonment. He was pardoned in April 2000. Zarandia entered into alliance with his former arch-enemy, the former Mkhedrioni leader Jaba Ioseliani, to oppose the government of Eduard Shevardnadze. On 2 June 2002, Zarandia's paramilitary group raided the voting stations in Zugdidi, leading to the termination of the local elections. On 8 January 2003, Zarandia was shot dead in Zugdidi cafe.

The Zviadists were nearly absent in the 2003 Georgian parliamentary election. They were represented mainly by two parties: the Union of Restoring National Consent and Justice, led by Guram Absandze, and a small monarchist party.

During the Rose Revolution, Mikheil Saakashvili went to Zugdidi to gather and organize his supporters. There, he made an ad hoc alliance with the Zviadist leader Guram Absandze, who joined the demonstrations against Shevardnadze in Tbilisi together with his supporters. When Shevardnadze resigned, Absandze proclaimed himself temporarily as the governor of Western Mingrelia but was subsequently replaced by an official appointee. Mingrelia provided Saakashvili with the strongest support during the Rose Revolution.

After coming to power, Saakashvili took steps to rehabilitate Gamsakhurdia, which was welcomed by most Mingrelians. He said that his key goal was to "put an end to disunity in our society". On 26 January 2004, Saakashvili signed the declaration on National Accord and Reconciliation. He also pardoned 30 Gamsakhurdia supporters who were arrested during or after the civil war. According to the United States Department of State 2005 Country Reports on Human Rights Practices, the Zviadists were reportedly no longer held as political prisoners, with the remaining Zviadists being released pursuant to pardoning commission recommendation and presidential approval. Saakashvili was successful in overcoming Mingrelia's estrangement.

On 4 April 2004, following the six weeks of negotiations, the Georgian government took a significant step toward national reconciliation by securing the surrender of a group of armed supporters of former President Zviad Gamsakhurdia who had spent more than a decade in hiding in the forests of Tsalenjikha following the 1992 military coup. The group, led by Gia Meskhia, agreed to lay down its arms, having become convinced that the government was acting in good faith and would not persecute them. Interior Minister Giorgi Baramidze welcomed the former fighters and symbolically presented them with farming tools to mark their return to civilian life after more than a decade of "abrek" lifestyle, while one member of the group was recruited into his personal security detail as a gesture of mutual trust. The negotiations were conducted by Guram Absandze, who now served as the State Minister.

On 31 March 2007, the remains of Zviad Gamsakhurdia were brought to Georgia from Chechnya, where he was originally buried. His remains were re-interred in the Mtatsminda Pantheon in Tbilisi alongside many other prominent Georgians. Saakashvili, being present at Mtatsminda, stressed that "Georgia will respect those who struggled for its independence".

Following the 2004 reconciliation process, many former officials and supporters of Zviad Gamsakhurdia's government showed loyalty toward President Mikheil Saakashvili's administration, and some were appointed to senior government positions. However, this support was not universal, and some Gamsakhurdia supporters continued to oppose the policies of the new government. In July 2004, activists of the "Round Table—Free Georgia" movement, led by Gamsakhurdia's widow Manana Archvadze-Gamsakhurdia, protested against Economy Minister Kakha Bendukidze's proposed large-scale privatization program, accusing him of betraying national interests. Absandze also criticized the Bendukidze's program. The protest demonstrated that, despite the successful reconciliation process and the participation of some former Gamsakhurdia supporters in Saakashvili's administration, parts of the movement continued to hold differing views on government policy.

== See also ==
- Round Table—Free Georgia
