= Besarion Gugushvili =

Former Prime Minister of Georgia

- ბესარიონ გუგუშვილი
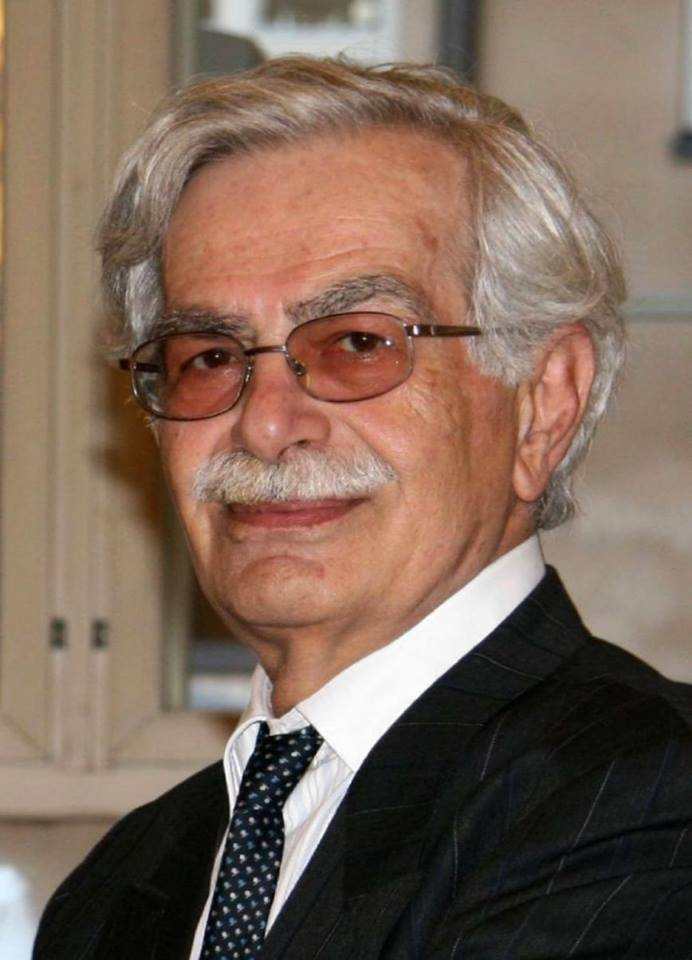
- Gugushvili in 2017

1st Prime Minister of Georgia
- In office 26 August 1991 – 6 January 1992
- President: Zviad Gamsakhurdia
- Preceded by: Murman Omanidze (acting); Tengiz Sigua
- Succeeded by: Tengiz Sigua

Personal details
- Born: 6 May 1945 (age 80) Tbilisi, Georgian SSR, Soviet Union (now Georgia)

Besarion Gugushvili (Georgian: ბესარიონ გუგუშვილი; born 6 May 1945) is a Georgian and Chechen politician and type designer who served as Prime Minister of Georgia from 26 August 1991 to 6 January 1992. Gugushvili was appointed as Prime Minister on 26 August 1991, following the resignation of Tengiz Sigua. A close associate of President Zviad Gamsakhurdia, he followed him into exile following the Georgian Civil War and took part in the 1993 uprising. From 1992 to 1994, Gugushvili was a Member of the Cabinet of Ministers of the Chechen Republic of Ichkeria under President Dzhokhar Dudayev, serving as acting as Head of Department of Statistics, as well as an economic advisor to Dudayev.

After the failure of the uprising and Gamsakhurdia's death, Gugushvili was granted political asylum in Finland. As of 2008, he lives in Vantaa. In his time in exile, Gugushvili has criticised what he considers to be the decreasing role of religion in Georgian life, as well as the spread of globalist and liberal ideas. He has also claimed that the Soviet Union, Turkish drug dealers, the government of the United States (in particular, then-President George H. W. Bush, Secretary of State James Baker, and Georgian, Polish-born General John Shalikashvili), Greek business interests, and German foreign minister Hans-Dietrich Genscher caused the fall of Gamsakhurdia's government and Eduard Shevardnadze's seizure of power.

Gugushvili designed the Georgian glyphs for the DejaVu typeface. He was also involved in the design of the Georgian script for the Nokia Pure typeface.

Political offices
| Preceded by Position created | Prime Minister of Georgia; 1991–1992 | Succeeded by Tengiz Sigua |
