= Mkhedrioni =

Georgian paramilitary organisation (1989-1995)

- მხედრიონი
- Flag of the Mkhedrioni
- Leaders: Jaba Ioseliani; Guram Mgeladze; Tengiz Kitovani; Tornike Berishvili; Temur Khachishvili
- Dates active: 1989 – Formally banned in November 1995; 1998
- Active regions: Georgia
- Size: 1,000–7,000 (1991); ~2,500 (1992–93)
- Wars: Georgian Civil War; 1991–1992 Georgian coup d'état; Abkhazia conflict; War in Abkhazia (1992–1993); Landing at Gagra (1992); War in Abkhazia (1998); Georgian–Ossetian conflict; 1991–1992 South Ossetia War

The Mkhedrioni (Georgian: მხედრიონი, romanized: mkhedrioni) was a Georgian nationalist paramilitary organisation founded in 1989 by Jaba Ioseliani. It emerged during Georgia's transition to independence from the Soviet Union and played a major role in the Georgian Civil War and the War in Abkhazia.

The Mkhedrioni was notorious for intimidation and criminal activities, including extortion, smuggling, robbery, and operating illegal roadblocks. It was banned by President Zviad Gamsakhurdia in 1991, regained influence after participating in the 1991–92 Georgian coup d'état that overthrew Gamsakhurdia, and was outlawed again in 1995 after the authorities accused Ioseliani and others of involvement in the attempted assassination of President Eduard Shevardnadze. After failing to secure registration to contest elections under its own name, it reconstituted itself as the Union of Patriots political party, which was also refused registration.

== Background ==
Founded in 1989 by Jaba Ioseliani, the Mkhedrioni presented itself as the heir to historic Georgian guerrilla groups who fought Iranian and Ottoman occupiers. The group's name literally means "horsemen", but in Georgian it has a meaning closer to "knights" (this alternative translation has occasionally been used). Each member of the organization would take an oath to defend Georgia's people, the Georgian Orthodox and Apostolic Church and Georgia's land, and wore a medallion with a scene of Saint George slaying the dragon on one side and the bearer's name and blood type on the other.

The establishment of the Mkhedrioni took place as Georgia moved towards independence in the final years of the Soviet Union. Relations between Georgian nationalists and the country's national minorities, especially the Abkhaz and Ossetians, were difficult at best even during Soviet rule and grew more tense during the rise to power of the nationalist dissident Zviad Gamsakhurdia. The Mkhedrioni was one of a number of nationalist paramilitary groups established during this period as a counterbalance to similar paramilitary organisations set up by rival nationalists elsewhere in Georgia.

The Mkhedrioni's members gained an unpleasant reputation as heavily armed thugs who engaged in violent intimidation of their rivals. They were highly visible, wearing what amounted to a uniform of jeans, sweaters and jackets, topped off by sunglasses (even worn indoors). Leaders wore Armani suits bulging with guns, according to one author. Mkhedrioni relied on illegal sources of income (targeting gasoline supplies) and exploited connections with Moscow's Georgian underworld. Mkhedrioni members were often accused of criminal activity, extorting "protection money" from businesses in areas which they effectively controlled, operating roadblocks where drivers would be "fined", smuggling drugs and committing robberies. By 1991, the Mkhedrioni was claimed to have had about 1,000 fighters and 10,000 associate members – considerably more than the official state National Guard.

Despite Gamsakhurdia and Ioseliani sharing a broadly similar nationalist outlook, the two men fell out badly shortly after Gamsakhurdia came to power in November 1990. In February 1991, Ioseliani was imprisoned without trial, along with many of his supporters, and the Mkhedrioni was banned. In August 1991, just after the Soviet coup attempt, Gamsakhurdia sacked Tengiz Kitovani, the commander of Georgia's National Guard, and his Prime Minister Tengiz Sigua resigned around the same time. Kitovani soon formed an anti-Gamsakhurdia alliance with Sigua and the imprisoned Ioseliani. In December 1991, Kitovani's supporters released Ioseliani from jail and launched a violent coup d'état against the Gamsakhurdia government in alliance with the Mkhedrioni. Intense gun battles took place in the streets of Tbilisi between the rebels and "Zviadists" holed up in the state parliament building during December 1991 – January 1992, which ended with Gamsakhurdia fleeing to the breakaway Russian republic of Chechnya. At least 100 people were killed in the fighting.

== The Mkhedrioni after Gamsakhurdia ==
The Mkhedrioni played a crucial role in suppressing the remaining "Zviadists" after the downfall of Gamsakhurdia. Eduard Shevardnadze, a former Soviet foreign minister, was brought in to provide a respectable face for the new government, but it remained dependent on the Mkhedrioni: even inside the parliament building, Mkhedrioni gunmen had a constant presence as "bodyguards" for Jaba Ioseliani, who was now a member of parliament. Mkhedrioni were given the role of the interior forces under the new government.

In 1993, worsening civil strife in Abkhazia prompted the Mkhedrioni and National Guard to launch a joint operation in the region to root out separatists and Gamsakhurdia supporters. This resulted in a disastrous defeat for the pro-government forces, who were driven out of Abkhazia along with virtually the entire ethnic Georgian population of the region: over 10,000 people were killed in the fighting. In September 1993, Gamsakhurdia took the opportunity to launch an armed uprising in western Georgia in an attempt to return to power. The Mkhedrioni played an important role in suppressing the uprising and were for a while given semi-official status as the "Georgian Rescue Corps". Russian intervention ensured Gamsakhurdia's defeat and on December 31 he reportedly committed suicide, though it has also been stated, and widely believed within Georgia, that he was murdered. Mkhedrioni forces were alleged in press reports to be responsible for his death, but they denied this.

The Mkhedrioni were subsequently given responsibility for rooting out "Zviadists" in western Georgia, which they did with a brutal efficiency that was widely criticised by foreign governments and international human rights organisations. Shevardnadze responded by gradually limiting the organisation's power. Although Ioseliani remained head of the supposedly civilianised organisation, it continued to function as a private army. In early 1995, Shevardnadze ordered it to disarm, accusing it of deep involvement in organised crime. He narrowly escaped assassination in a bomb attack on August 29, 1995, which he blamed on a shadowy coalition of "mafia forces" including Ioseliani and others. Other acts of political violence were also blamed on the Mkhedrioni. The organisation was outlawed and Ioseliani imprisoned, although many regarded the claim that it had been involved in the bombing as being inconclusively proven.

In spite of its banning, the Mkhedrioni continued to have a somewhat shadowy existence in Georgian politics. A number of members, led by Tornike Berishvili, recreated it in 1999 as an ostensibly political rather than paramilitary organisation. It has been claimed that the Mkhedrioni had relations with Chechen separatists and continued to be involved in criminal and paramilitary activities, including continued guerrilla attacks in Abkhazia. Jaba Ioseliani was released from prison in an amnesty in April 2000 and resumed his post as head of the Mkhedrioni, declaring his intention to run for president and participate in the November 2003 parliamentary elections. However, Ioseliani died of a heart attack in March 2003.

When the Mkhedrioni failed to secure registration to stand in elections under its own name, it reconstituted itself in November 2002 as a political party called the Union of Patriots in alliance with former Gamsakhurdia supporters. It was again refused registration by the government. Its leader Badri Zarandia was assassinated on January 8, 2003.

== Sources ==
- Rupert, James (14 January 1992). "Christian Knights Claim Key Role in Georgia". The Washington Post.
- Bonner, Raymond (16 November 1993). "Georgian Fighter Wields Guns, Money and Charm". The New York Times.
- "Dzhaba Ioseliani, 76; Oft-Imprisoned Leader of Georgian Paramilitary Force". Associated Press. 5 March 2003 – via Los Angeles Times.
- Corley, Felix (25 March 2003). "Jaba Ioseliani: Violent warlord in post-Communist Georgia". The Independent.
- "Shevardnadze Is Wounded By Car Bomb In Georgia (Published 1995)". 1995-08-30. Archived from the original on 2024-04-23.
- "Georgians Held in Failed Assassination of Shevardnadze". Los Angeles Times. 1995-09-19.
- "IOSELIANI AND ACCOMPLICES SENTENCED. - Jamestown". jamestown.org.
- "1997 Human Rights Report: Georgia". 1997-2001.state.gov.
