= Tbilisi TV Broadcasting Tower =

- თბილისის ტელეანძა
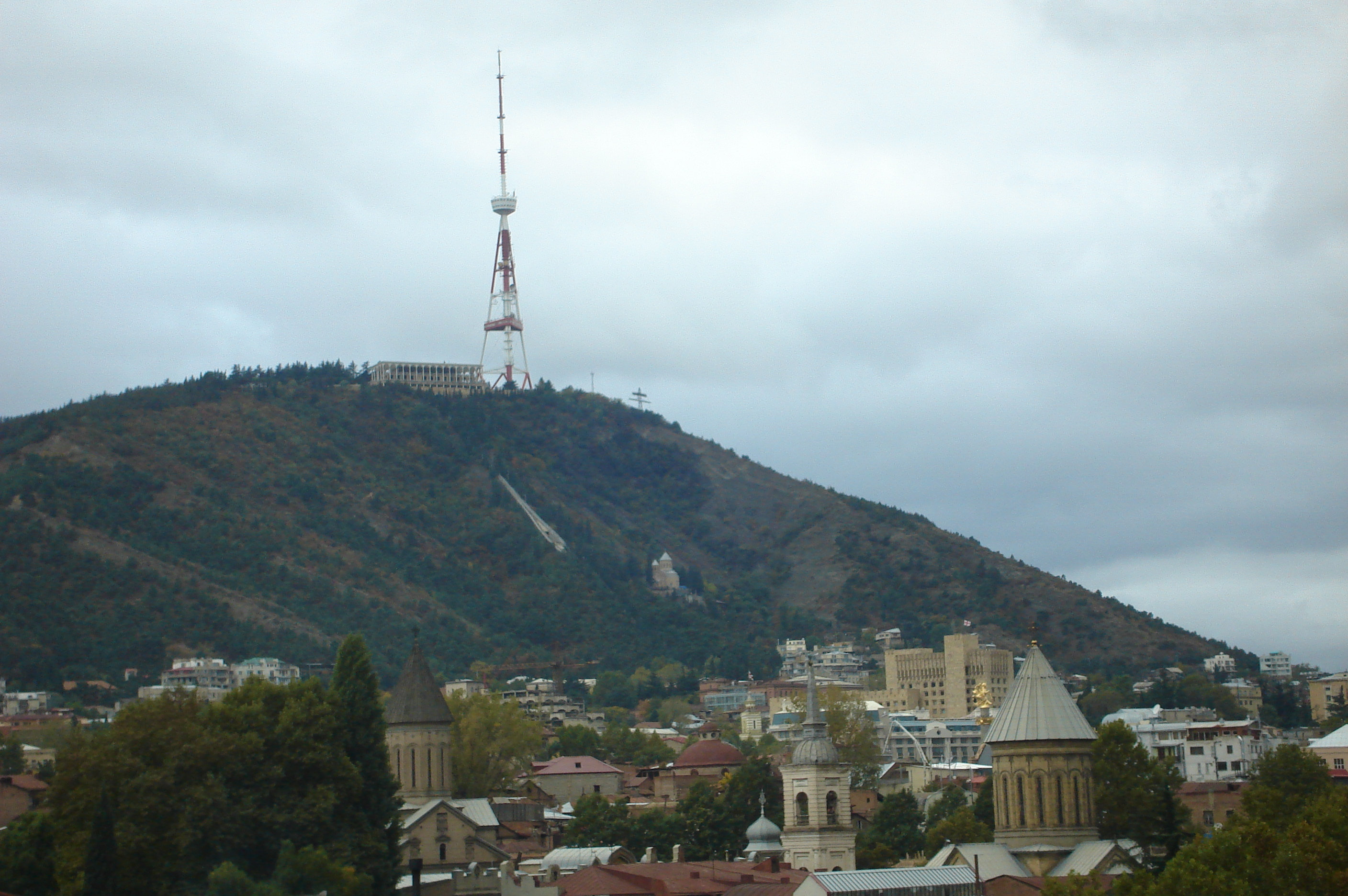
- Interactive map of the Tbilisi TV Broadcasting Tower area

General information
- Status: Completed
- Type: Telecommunications
- Location: Tbilisi, Georgia
- Coordinates: 41°41′45″N 44°47′05″E
- Opening: 1972

Height
- Antenna spire: 274.5 m (900.6 ft)

Georgia Tbilisi TV Broadcasting Tower (Georgian: თბილისის ტელეანძა, tbilisis teleandza) is a free-standing tower structure used for communications purposes. The tower is located in Tbilisi, Georgia and was built in 1972. The preceding structure, built in 1955, was moved to the vicinity of the city of Gori.

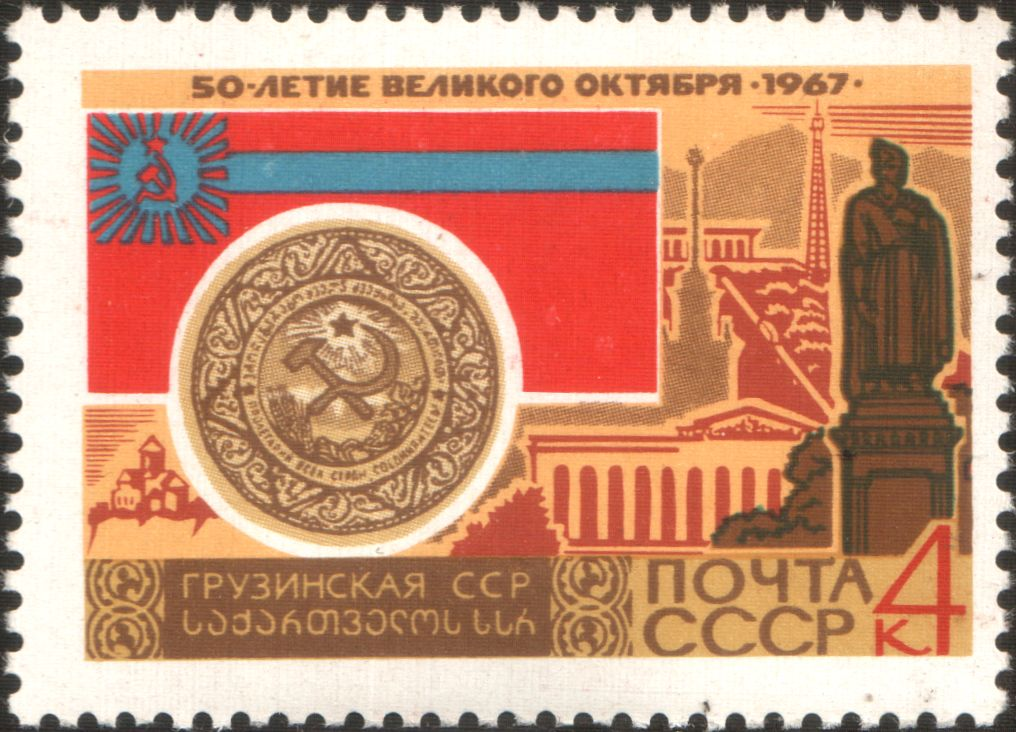
Previous Tbilisi TV tower, relocated later to Gori, on a 1967 stamp

The tower is operated by "Georgian Teleradiocenter", that was established in 1955. Communication systems on the tower include regular broadcast, MMDS, pager and cellular, commercial TV, and amateur radio repeater. The tower is 274.5 m (901 ft) high on a mountain 719.2 m (2,360 feet) above sea level.

== See also ==
- List of tallest freestanding steel structures
- Lattice tower
- List of towers
- List of masts
