= Jaba Ioseliani =

Georgian politician, thief, and paramilitary leader (1926-2003)

- ჯაბა იოსელიანი
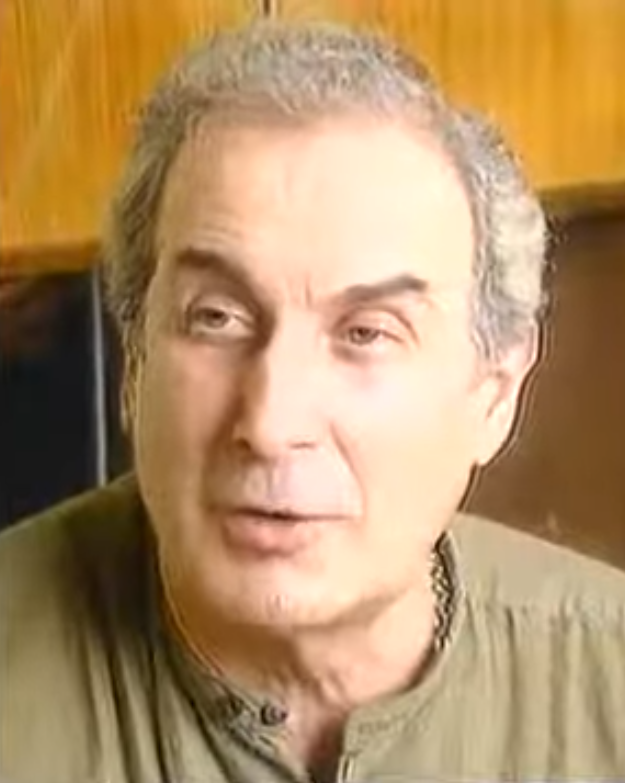

Chairman of The Military Council of Georgia
- In office 6 January 1992 – 10 March 1992 Serving with Tengiz Kitovani
- Preceded by: Zviad Gamsakhurdia (as President of Georgia)
- Succeeded by: Eduard Shevardnadze (as Chairman Of The State Council of Georgia)

Leader Of Mkhedrioni
- In office 1989–1995
- Preceded by: Position established
- Succeeded by: Position abolished

Member of the Parliament of Georgia
- In office 1992–1995

Personal details
- Born: 10 July 1926 Khashuri, Georgian SSR, Transcaucasian SFSR, Soviet Union
- Died: 4 March 2003 (aged 76) Tbilisi, Georgia
- Height: 1.83 m (6 ft 0 in)

Jaba Ioseliani (Georgian: ჯაბა იოსელიანი; 10 July 1926 – 4 March 2003) was a Georgian politician, member of Parliament of Georgia, writer, thief-in-law and leader of the paramilitary organisation Mkhedrioni.

== Biography ==
Born in Khashuri, Georgia, Ioseliani majored in Oriental studies at Leningrad University but did not graduate. He staged a bank robbery in Leningrad in 1948, for which he served 17 years in a Soviet jail. Released in 1965, he later served another sentence for manslaughter. He eventually returned to his native Georgia and graduated from the Georgian Institute of Theater Arts, where he became a professor. He wrote a number of popular plays.

Ioseliani rose to prominence as the leader of the Mkhedrioni, a heavily armed paramilitary group which he founded in 1989. In February 1991, his organisation was outlawed by President Zviad Gamsakhurdia and he was imprisoned along with other Mkhedrioni members. In response, Ioseliani accused Gamsakhurdia of trying to take control of state media and silence rivals.

In December 1991, Ioseliani escaped from prison and joined forces with rebel members of the Georgian National Guard to launch a violent coup d'état that forced President Zviad Gamsakhurdia out of office in January 1992. He was one of the three leaders of the "Military Council" that ruled Georgia from January–March 1992, with Tengiz Kitovani and Tengiz Sigua. He subsequently became a powerful figure in the government of President Eduard Shevardnadze, who was forced to rely heavily on Mkhedrioni militiamen because of the weakness of the state security forces. Ioseliani made it clear who he thought was the senior partner: his office in the Georgian Parliament building was located directly above Shevardnadze's and he was constantly surrounded with armed followers wherever he went. His actions earned him many enemies: on 13 June 1992, there was a failed assassination attempt against Ioseliani with a car bomb, resulting in the death of 5 people.

During the South Ossetia war and War in Abkhazia, Mkhedrioni led by Jaba Ioseliani attempted to take control of large areas of Abkhazia and South Ossetia with the goal of defeating separatist elements. After the defeat of the Georgian forces, Ioseliani was given a formal government position in September 1993 to enforce a national state of emergency in the Western Georgia amidst the Georgian Civil War. This gave him almost unlimited powers to detain people. He used these powers enthusiastically, imposing a severely repressive regime that was widely criticised by international human rights organisations. Supporters of the ousted Gamsakhurdia were vigorously targeted, especially in the pro-Gamsakhurdia region of Samegrelo, where the Mkhedrioni were accused of carrying out a number of extrajudicial killings. There were also widespread allegations that Ioseliani and his supporters were systematically "taxing" businesses and individuals in areas under their control. Mkhedrioni forces were reportedly engaging in rape, terrorism and looting of Georgian villages according to The New York Times.

On 29 August 1995, Shevardnadze narrowly escaped assassination in a bomb attack. The attack was blamed on a shadowy coalition of "mafia forces" including Ioseliani and others. Ioseliani was detained on 15 November 1995 and held for three years pending trial, then on 10 November 1998 sentenced to 11 years for banditry, terrorism, and conspiring to kill Shevardnadze. He denied the charges and was eventually released in the spring of 2000 in a general amnesty of convicts. He suffered a heart attack on 26 February 2003 and died in a Tbilisi hospital a week later. He is buried in the Pantheon of Didube, Tbilisi.
