= Tengiz Kitovani =

Georgian politician and military commander (1938–2023)

- თენგიზ კიტოვანი
- Kitovani in 1991

Leader of the Military Council of Georgia
- In office 6 January 1992 – 10 March 1992 Serving with Jaba Ioseliani

Minister of Defense of Georgia
- In office 8 May 1992 – 5 May 1993
- Preceded by: Levan Sharashenidze
- Succeeded by: Giorgi Karkarashvili

Personal details
- Born: 9 June 1938 Tbilisi, Georgian SSR, Soviet Union
- Died: 13 November 2023 (aged 85)
- Party: Round Table—Free Georgia (1990–1991); Union of Georgian Traditionalists (1990–1991)
- Other political affiliations: National Front for the Liberation of Abkhazia (1994–1995)

Military service
- Allegiance: Mkhedrioni; Georgia
- Branch/service: National Guard; Ministry of Defense
- Rank: General
- Battles/wars: Georgian Civil War; South Ossetia war (1991–92); War in Abkhazia (1992–93)

Tengiz Kitovani (Georgian: თენგიზ კიტოვანი tengiz k’it’ovani; 9 June 1938 – 13 November 2023) was a Georgian politician and military officer who was a prominent military figure in the Georgian Civil War (1991–1993) when he commanded the Georgian National Guard.

Kitovani also served as a minister of defense until being gradually sidelined by Eduard Shevardnadze who had earlier been invited to lead the nation after a successful coup d'etat launched by Kitovani and his allies against President Zviad Gamsakhurdia.

== Early life and career ==
Born in Tbilisi on 9 June 1938, Kitovani graduated from the Tbilisi Fine Arts Academy and taught at a boarding school in the town of Tetritsqaro.

Kitovani entered national politics early in 1990 when the independence movement reached its climax in then-Soviet Georgia. Elected to the Supreme Council of Georgia the same year, he was closely associated with Zviad Gamsakhurdia, a Soviet-era dissident who went on to become the chairman of the Presidium of the Supreme Council and eventually the President of Georgia in 1991.

In December 1990, Gamsakhurdia decreed the creation of the National Guard of Georgia and appointed Kitovani as its head. However, the two men feuded in August 1991, when Gamsakhurdia sacked him as National Guard commander. Kitovani subsequently claimed that Gamsakhurdia was intending to disband the National Guard, and had been ordered to do so by the leaders of the 1991 Soviet coup d'état attempt, but did not produce the documents he claimed to possess confirming this. Kitovani refused to accept his dismissal and left Tbilisi with most of his troops to entrench himself in the Rkoni Gorge. This was the beginning of the end for Gamsakhurdia, whose inflexible politics forced many of his former supporters into opposition.

== Military coup and civil war ==
The confrontation between pro- and anti-Gamsakhurdia factions quickly degenerated into a series of strikes and armed clashes, and eventually, Kitovani, joined by Gamsakhurdia's former Prime Minister Tengiz Sigua and the paramilitary leader Jaba Ioseliani, launched a violent coup in December 1991. Ioseliani, as well as Gamsakhurdia's supporters and some independent observers, claimed that Kitovani hired some Soviet/Russian troops stationed in Tbilisi to join the attack on the government.

On 2 January 1992, the deposition of Gamsakhurdia and the formation of the Military Council was announced with Kitovani and Ioseliani as its leaders. Gamsakhurdia was forced into exile on 6 January 1992, and the coup leaders invited the former Soviet foreign minister Eduard Shevardnadze to head the post-coup provisional government – the State Council – in March 1992. As a result of the power-sharing arrangement that was eventually struck between Ioseliani, Kitovani, Sigua and Shevardnadze, Kitovani remained the commander of the National Guard and retained a considerable influence on decision-making. In May 1992, Shevardnadze appointed Kitovani Minister of Defence and Deputy Prime Minister in an effort to bring the National Guard under central control. However, both Kitovani and Ioseliani were reluctant to concede power to Shevardnadze and tended to engage in unilateral actions, and in doing so frequently conflicted with each other.

The first and most obvious of such actions were taken by Kitovani during a planned military operation against Gamsakhurdia's supporters who had formed pockets of armed resistance in western Georgia and had taken Georgian government officials hostage. On the night of 13 August 1992, Kitovani's force entered the autonomous republic of Abkhazia, whose leadership had taken a series of steps towards secession from Georgia, in order to establish control over the region's railways sabotaged by Gamsakhurdia's loyal militias. Although this operation and show of force resulted in the eventual release of the hostages, Kitovani, acting most probably on his own initiative, proceeded towards Abkhazia's capital of Sukhumi and forced the Abkhaz leaders into flight. Shevardnadze failed to have Kitovani's force withdrawn from Abkhazia and the country became involved in a thirteen-month-long war which would end in Georgia's loss of control over most of Abkhazia. Another version of these events, often quoted in Georgia, says that Russia, while supporting the Abkhaz, also instigated Kitovani to trigger the conflict and perhaps even promised support for his leadership ambitions in Georgia after a successful operation. Later, Shevardnadze would accuse Kitovani of provoking an armed conflict in Abkhazia, claiming that Kitovani disavowed his order and advanced with his military to Sukhumi. Kitovani however blamed Shevardnadze for preventing him from following up an offensive on Sukhumi with an attack on the Abkhaz stronghold in Gudauta, home to a Russian military base which supplied the secessionist forces with instructors and munitions.

== Conflict with Shevardnadze ==
During the war in Abkhazia, Kitovani developed a power centre rivalling Shevardnadze's and on several occasions challenged Shevardnadze, now Head of State, on defence matters, suggesting that he should be responsible only for foreign policy. Kitovani stood as a candidate in Georgia's parliamentary elections of 11 October 1992 and was elected in the single-mandate constituency of Bolnisi. In the aftermath of the elections, Shevardnadze attempted to replace him as Minister of Defence with a professional soldier, General Anatoli Kamkamidze but was unable to do so. Amid persistent rumours that he was planning a new military coup, Kitovani was finally forced into resignation in May 1993 – though a protégé, Gia Karkarashvili, was named as his replacement, and he was able to retain some of his power – partly, according to widespread rumours in Tbilisi, through his control over Georgia's "energy mafia" and his "special relationship" with Russian defence minister Pavel Grachev.

However, Shevardnadze was able to exploit the military setback in Abkhazia to embark on a crackdown on the paramilitary groups and ultimately their leaders. After the pro-Gamsakhurdia rebellion had been quashed with Russian aid by December 1993, Shevardnadze was able to increasingly consolidate his power and deprive both Kitovani and Ioseliani of influence over national security policy.

After spending some time in Russia, Kitovani returned to Tbilisi and, together with Tengiz Sigua and Boris Kakubava, leader of a faction of ethnic Georgian IDPs from Abkhazia, founded the National Front for the Liberation of Abkhazia in the autumn of 1994.

On 13 January 1995, Kitovani, with the support of Tengiz Sigua, led a force of some 700 lightly armed supporters in a march against Abkhazia. They were stopped by Georgian police and arrested. Kitovani was tried for having organized an unlawful armed force and sentenced to eight years' imprisonment in October 1996. He served four years of his eight-year term and was pardoned by Shevardnadze on medical grounds on 22 May 1999.

== Emigration and return ==
From the early 2000s, Kitovani lived in Moscow from where he harshly criticized the Shevardnadze government on several occasions. In February 2002, he responded scandalously to the mysterious suicide of Nugzar Sajaia, Shevardnadze's close ally and an influential Chairman of Georgia's National Security Council, making allegations that Sajaia was a homosexual and had ordered the 2001 murder of journalist Giorgi Sanaia. Later that year, Kitovani accused Shevardnadze of being behind the 2002 assassination of Kakhi Asatiani, a businessman and former football star. He also upheld Russia's claims that some 700 Chechen fighters had spent that winter in Georgia's Pankisi Gorge. He further claimed that Russian General Gennady Shpigun, abducted and killed in Chechnya in 1999/2000, was in fact held captive and put to death in Pankisi, with the body then taken to southern Chechnya. Georgia dismissed all these claims.

Georgian Prosecutor-General Nugzar Gabrichidze claimed that Kitovani had been in close contact with National Guard veterans who staged a failed mutiny on 23 March 2003. Kitovani, however, denied any links with the mutiny.

Kitovani returned to Tbilisi, in December 2012, after the change of government in the aftermath of the October 2012 parliamentary election. In early 2014, President Giorgi Margvelashvili stripped him of his Georgian citizenship.

Kitovani died on 13 November 2023, at age 85.

== Notes ==
Preceded by Levan Sharashenidze	Minister of Defense of Georgia; May 1992 – May 1993	Succeeded by Giorgi Karkarashvili
