= Caucasus Research Resource Centers =

The Caucasus Research Resource Centers program (CRRC) is a network for training, research, support and resource centers. The network was established from 2002 onwards in the capitals of Georgia, Armenia and Azerbaijan, in partnership with the Carnegie Corporation of New York, the Eurasian Partnership Foundation, USAID and local universities.

The CRRC aims to enhance social science and public policy research in the Southern Caucasus region. The program builds a network of scholars, researchers, and practitioners who can improve their research skills and methods, and collaborate with the regional research community. The CRRC’s regional office supports the country-based centers in forming partnerships among regional scholars, policy practitioners, and social science research professionals, as well as with governmental and non-governmental sectors.

In 2004, CRRC began the largest coordinated data collection effort in the South Caucasus region known as the Caucasus Barometer. The Caucasus Barometer is a regular nationwide survey in Georgia, Armenia and, in previous years, Azerbaijan that covers a wide range of, socioeconomic and political issues in the region. With a sample size of about 6,000 people, the Caucasus Barometer available online to the public on the CRRC’s website. In addition to the Caucasus Barometer, the CRRC conducts multiple other surveys, focus groups, and other research projects in the Southern Caucasus region.

== Fellowship Programs ==
The CRRC offers fellowship programs. The Junior Fellowship program was established in 2004 to promote and facilitate first-hand research experience for regional novice researchers within the CRRC team. Fellows also receive rigorous training and contribute to the integration of the South Caucasus region into global academic circles. The Junior Fellowship Program has been in operation in Georgia since 2009, in Azerbaijan since 2011, and in Armenia since 2013. Before 2013, the Armenian office facilitated a long-standing homegrown traditional fellowship program.

== Libraries and computer resources for the public ==
Each CRRC center has a library and a computer laboratory. These resources provide the public and researchers with a range of information resources such as textbooks, reference materials, and journals. The computer laboratories provide access to online journals and databases related to social sciences.
