= Tengiz Sigua =

Georgian politician; Prime Minister of Georgia (1934–2020)

- თენგიზ სიგუა
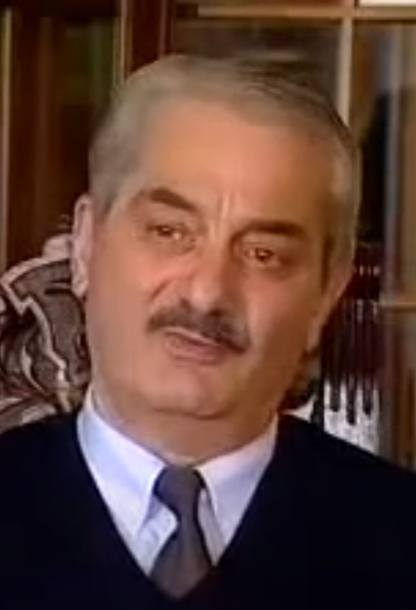

2nd Prime Minister of Georgia
- In office 6 January 1992 – 6 August 1993 (acting until 8 November 1992)
- President: Eduard Shevardnadze
- Preceded by: Besarion Gugushvili
- Succeeded by: Eduard Shevardnadze (acting)

Chairman of the Council of Ministers of Georgia
- In office 15 November 1990 – 18 August 1991
- President: Zviad Gamsakhurdia
- Preceded by: Nodar Chitanava
- Succeeded by: Murman Omanidze (acting); Besarion Gugushvili

Personal details
- Born: 9 November 1934 Lentekhi, Georgian SSR, Transcaucasian SFSR, Soviet Union
- Died: 21 January 2020 (aged 85) Tbilisi, Georgia

Tengiz Sigua (Georgian: თენგიზ სიგუა; 9 November 1934 – 21 January 2020) was a Georgian politician who served as Prime Minister of Georgia from 1992 to 1993.

Sigua was an engineer by profession and entered politics on the eve of the Soviet Union's collapse. In 1990 he led an expert group of the bloc "Round Table-Free Georgia". Following the first multiparty elections in Georgia, he was elected Chair of the Ministers' Council of the Georgian Soviet Socialist Republic on 14 November 1990.

He was the prime minister in Zviad Gamsakhurdia's government from 15 November 1990 to 18 August 1991. However, he resigned in August 1991 after disagreements with the president. He later remarked that the newspapers used to call Gamsakhurdia "Caucasian Saddam Hussein". Along with the National Guard leader Tengiz Kitovani and the paramilitary leader Jaba Ioseliani, he became a leader of the uneasy opposition which launched a violent coup against the President in December 1991-January 1992. After Gamsakhurdia's fall, he became Prime Minister in the Georgian interim government (Military Council, later transformed into the State Council) which was joined by Eduard Shevardnadze) on 6 January 1992. He was reappointed Prime Minister on 8 November 1992 by the newly elected Parliament.

He resigned on 6 August 1993 after the Parliament rejected the budget submitted by the government. He remained as an MP, led the National Liberation Front opposition party and backed a military solution of the Abkhazia conflict.

In an interview with the Russian news agency Ria Novosti, Sigua accused the Georgian side of starting the 2008 war: "We started the war in 2008. We started to shell Tskhinvali and this, after the death of Russian peacekeepers, gave Russian troops the right to actively interfere".

== See also ==
- List of Georgians
- Prime Minister of Georgia

Political offices
Preceded by Bessarion Gugushvili	Prime Minister of Georgia; 1992–1993	Succeeded by Eduard Shevardnadze
