= Bandza =

Bandza ბანძა
- Village
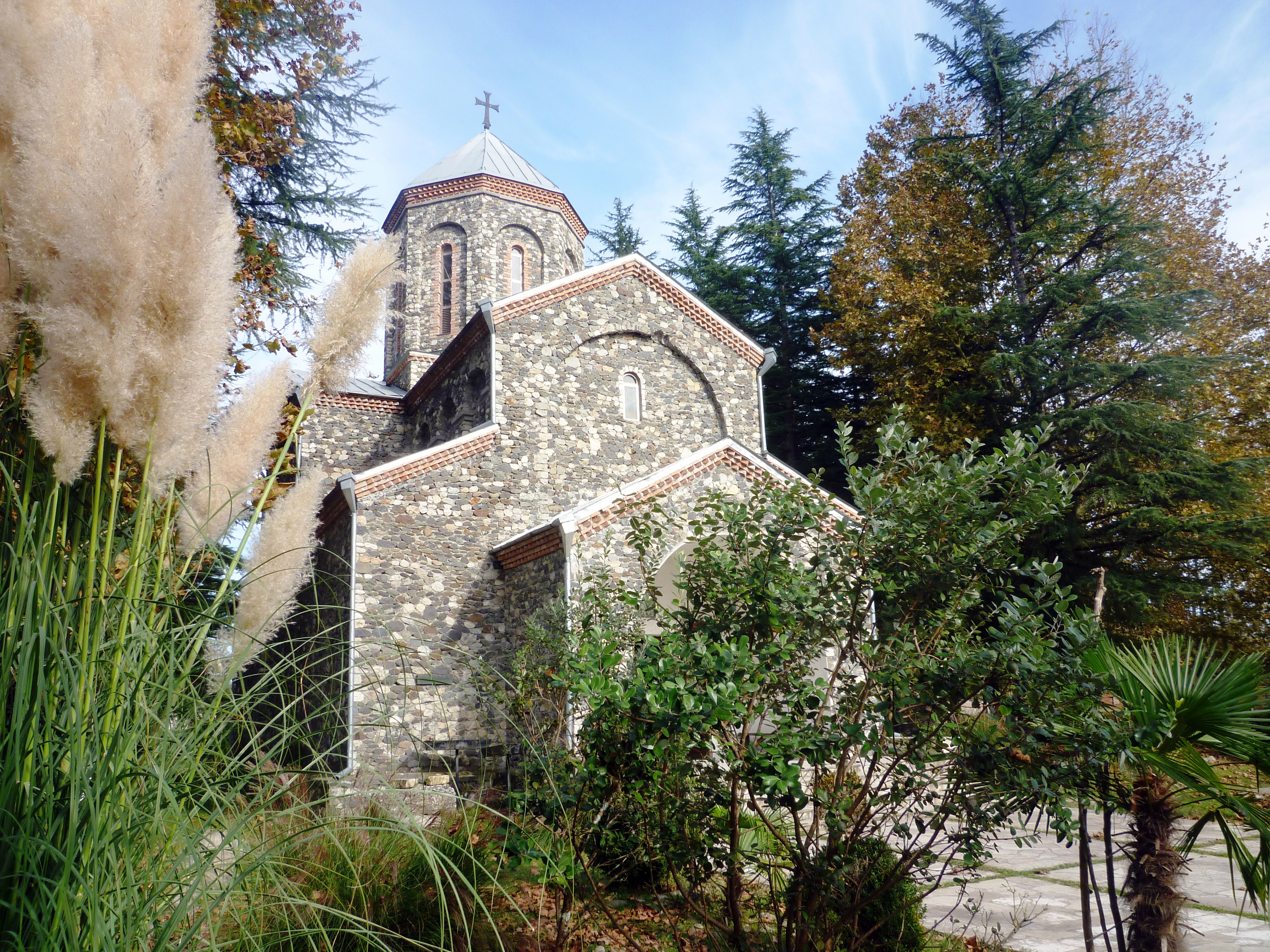
- St. Virgin church of Bandza Angle

- Location within Samegrelo-Zemo Svaneti Location within Georgia
- Coordinates: 42°20′56″N 42°17′03″E
- Country: Georgia
- Region: Samegrelo-Zemo Svaneti
- Municipality: Martvili
- Elevation: 90 m (300 ft)

Population (2014)
  - Total: 1,099
- Time zone: UTC+4 (Georgian time)

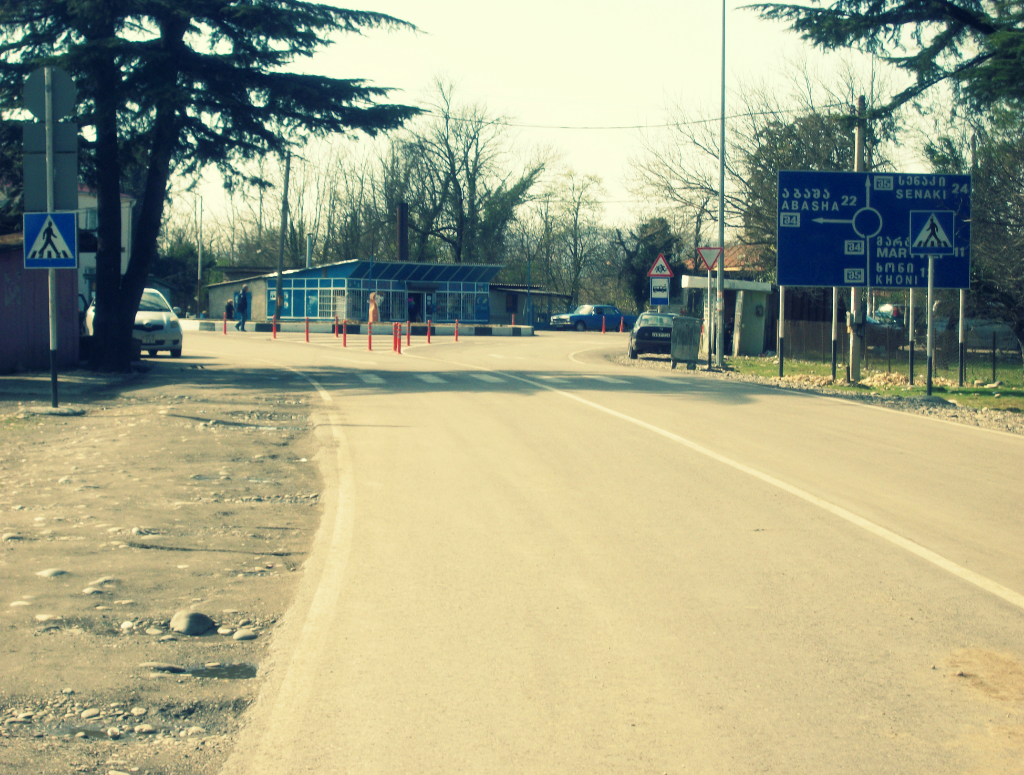
The center place in Bandza

Bandza (Georgian: ბანძა) is a village located in the west part of Georgia, Martvili municipality (in the Samegrelo-Zemo Svaneti region). It consists of three small villages: Levakhane, Lekekele, Lepatarave. Bandza is situated on Odishi-Guria plain, on the left side of the river Abasha. It is 7 kilometers to Martvili from Bandza and 22 kilometers to Abasha. According to the data of 2014, 1099 people live in the village. Bandza is under Chkondidi Diocese.

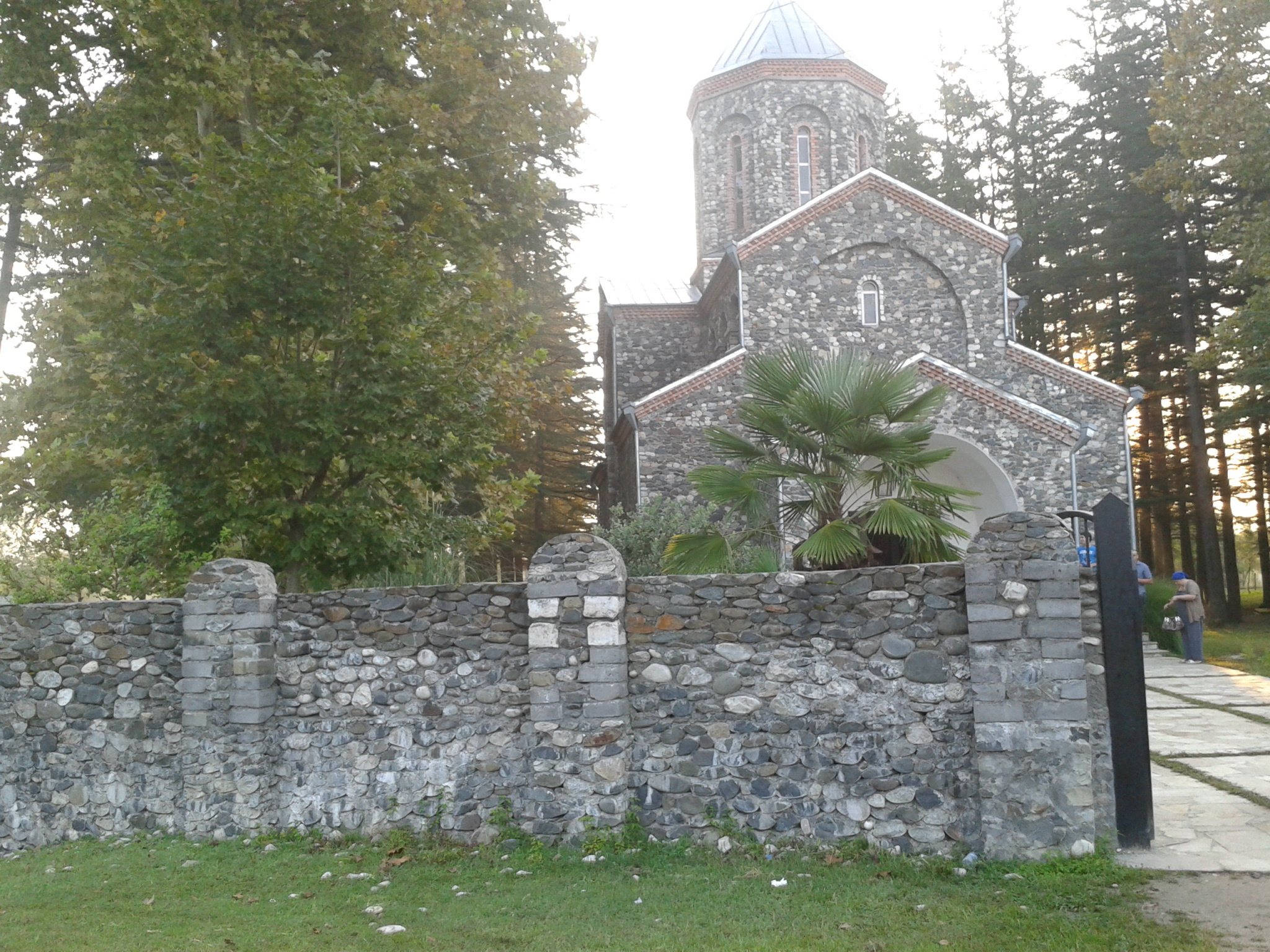
Church of the Assumption in Bandza

== History ==
Bandza was first mentioned in 1699–1740 in the description of Russian Ambassador. In 1658 there was a battle between kings of Imereti and Guria-Samegrelo. Vakhushti Batonishvili writes about the village as “Bandza and castle kindly built”. There is marked “Bandza-Paghao Castle” on the map of the west Georgia created in 1797.

== Synagogue ==
In the second half of 18th century Jewish people started to live in the west part of Georgia. They settled in Kulevi, Kutaisi, Poti, Senaki and lately in Bandza. At the beginning of 20th century they built a synagogue in the Jewish district of Bandza. There is also Jewish cemetery near the synagogue. The synagogue is not active today but many Jewish people visit it very often.

== Famous People ==
- Georgian footballer Murtaz Khurtsilava was born in Bandza.
- Famous Georgian Theater and Film actor Anzor Urdia was originally from Banzda.

== See also ==
- Samegrelo-Zemo Svaneti
