= Gachedili Canyon Natural Monument =

Erosion canyon in Martvili, Samegrelo, Georgia

- Abasha Canyon Natural Monument, Martvili Canyon Natural Monument
- IUCN category III (natural monument or feature)
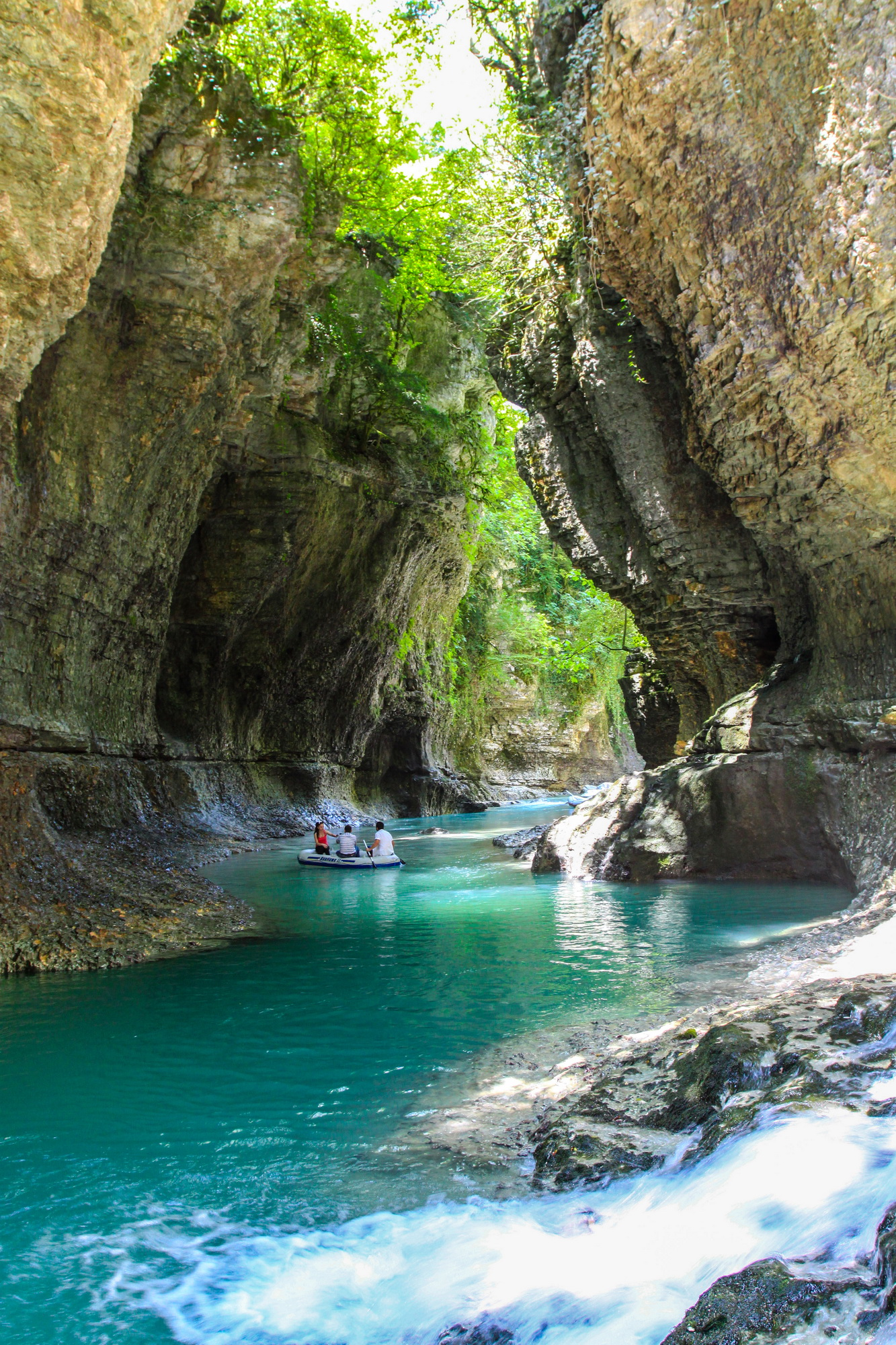
- Visitors on boat voyage through Gachedili canyon

- Location within Georgia Location within Samegrelo-Zemo Svaneti
- Location: Georgia
- Nearest city: Martvili
- Coordinates: 42°27′24.2″N 42°22′32.6″E
- Area: 0.25 km^{2} (0.097 sq mi)
- Established: 2013
- Governing body: Agency of Protected Areas
- Website: Abasha Canyon Natural Monument

Gachedili Canyon Natural Monument (Georgian: მარტვილის კანიონი) also known as Abasha Canyon Natural Monument (Georgian: აბაშის კანიონის ბუნების ძეგლი) and Martvili Canyon (Georgian: მარტვილის კანიონი) is an Abasha river erosion canyon located in Samegrelo region of Western Georgia in Martvili Municipality near Gachedili village, 240 meters above sea level. The water in the Abasha river has deep green color in the canyon. The Gachedili Canyon Natural Monument is located 6 km from the popular Balda Canyon Natural Monument. A canyon visitor center is located in the village Great Inchkhuri on the northern outskirts of the Martvili.

== History ==
Gachedili Canyon used to be a bath place for the Dadiani noble family. Well-preserved remains of a characteristic Megrelian two-storey mill operational in 18th and 19th centuries can be seen in canyon proximity. The lower canyon Dadiani trail has a 30 steps staircase made of large squares of limestone. According to the legend, this stairway was followed by George the Hagiorite and David IV of Georgia.

== Morphology ==
Gachedili Canyon is 2,400 metres (1.5 mi) long, 5 to 7 metres (16 to 23 ft) wide and 50 to 70 metres (160 to 230 ft) deep. In the center of the canyon, waterfalls with 12 to 15 metres (39 to 49 ft) high drops exist. The Gachedili Canyon was carved by erosive action of the Abasha River in the limestone rocks of the southern part of the Ashkah massif in the Odishi-Guria plain. Canyon creation was triggered by a major earthquake, which was responsible for many Abbasid rifts. Limestone bridges preserved in two locations along canyon and provide evidence of the collapse of one or several karst caves. From the structural geology prospective it is evident that the fold was formed in Mesozoic and Paleocene sediments which are now exposed by canyon erosion.

== Paleontological findings ==
Canyon provides paleontological insight into Mesozoic age and Paleogene age, the time of giant reptiles, mammals and birds. In 2010 in the area between Gatshedili and Inchkhuri villages, an Ilia State University expedition found about 20 footprints of dinosaurs along with some bone fragments mostly of herbivorous dinosaurs of medium size. Numerous remains of invertebrates, such as nautiloids, ammonites, brachiopods and sea urchins helped to determine geological epoch of these findings. They originated from the upper Cretaceous period of the Mesozoic Era, Maastrichtian and Danish periods, or 100.5–65.5 Ma, the period coinciding with a 200 million year long supremacy of dinosaurs. Also found were fragments of giant reptile of the extinct sea-Mosasaur. A second Ilia State University expedition in 2011 found in some caves, prehistoric human remains (bones and bones fragments) along with the bones of extinct animals, such as the cave bear and bison. Fossilized bones of prehistoric Earth animals, which lived 65-75 million years ago, also has been found by expeditions from the Ilia State University International Institute of Earth Sciences. As a result of these findings, the Gachedili canyon was made a protected area by the government of Georgia in October 2010.

== Flora and fauna ==
The Gachedili Canyon limestone cliffs are surrounded by Euxine-Colchic deciduous forests with typical mixed flora, including yew, black alder (Alnus glutinosa), hornbeam (Carpinus betulus and C. orientalis), Oriental beech (Fagus orientalis), and sweet chestnut (Castanea sativa) together with evergreen Nordmann fir (Abies nordmanniana), Caucasian spruce (Picea orientalis) and Scots pine (Pinus sylvestris) and many varieties of mosses and ferns.

The lower part of the Canyon is rich in trout and other species of fish. Amphibians and reptiles include European green toad (Bufotes viridis), hylidae, dice snake (Natrix tessellata). There are also birds of prey and several species of bats.

== Tourist attractions ==
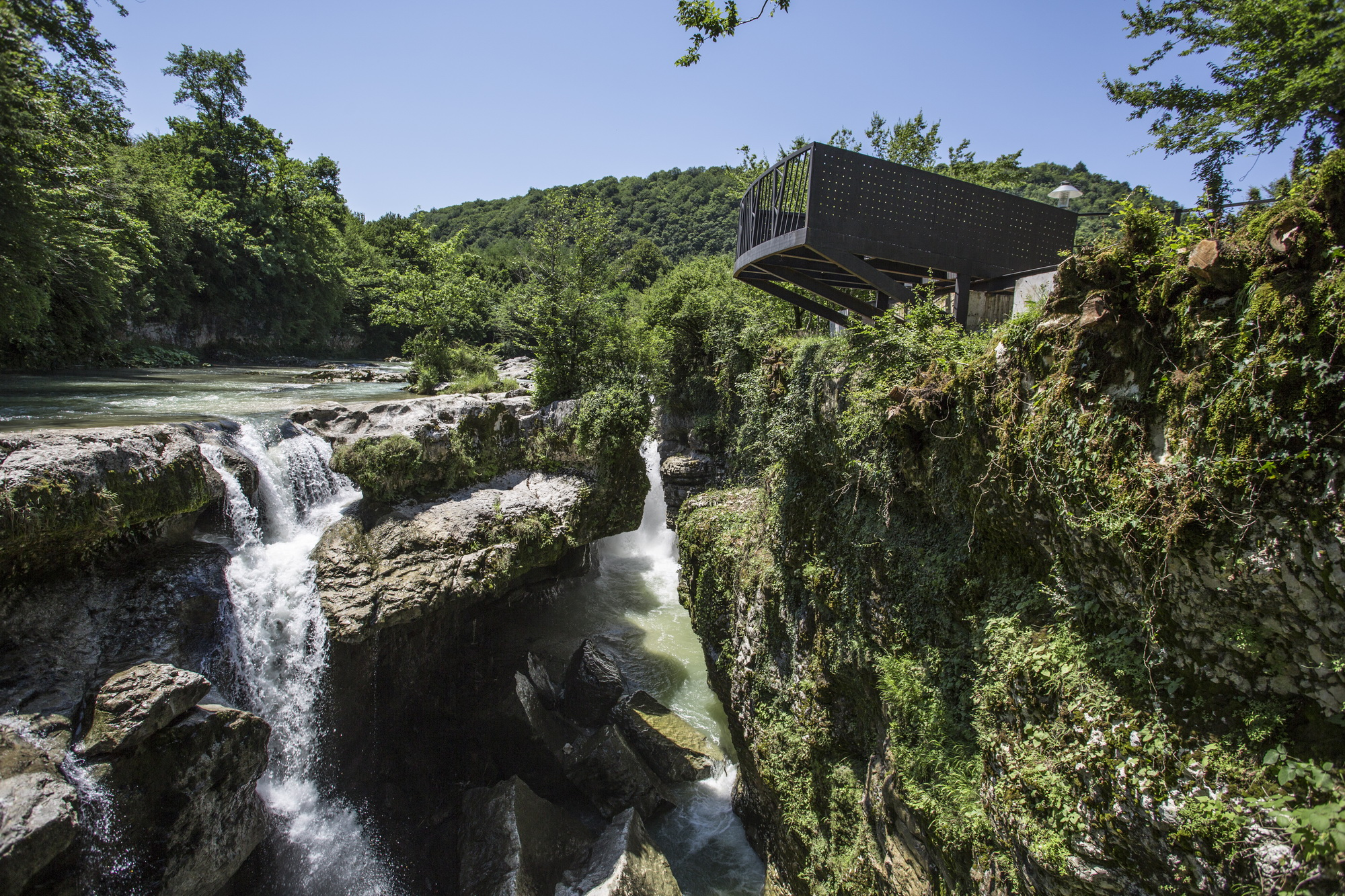
Gachedili Waterfall and viewing platform.

From the canyon visitor center, the 700 m long stone-paved tourist route has two bridges that lead to three canyon viewing platforms and to the historic Dadiani trail. Visitors are also offered a boat trip through canyon on a 300 meter long section of the Abasha river. One section of the canyon, known as the Dadiani's Bath, boasts an exceptional beauty.

Until the early 2000s the canyon was virtually unknown except by locals. However, recently the site has experienced a visitor boom from both locals and tourists alike. Some accidents have occurred with daredevils jumping from waterfalls, swimmers in the high water, scuba diving without proper equipment or training and rappelling or spelunking activities. The government has responded by restricting access through an electronic ticketing system in order to increase safe access for tourists and to preserve the natural beauty of the canyon - the hidden gem of Martvili. Water in the canyon stays very cold year around and does not get warmer as seasons change.

== See also ==
- Balda Canyon Natural Monument
- Abasha (river)
- River Abasha Waterfall Natural Monument
