= Gachedili =

Gachedili Mingrelian: გოჭკადილი Gochkadili
- Village
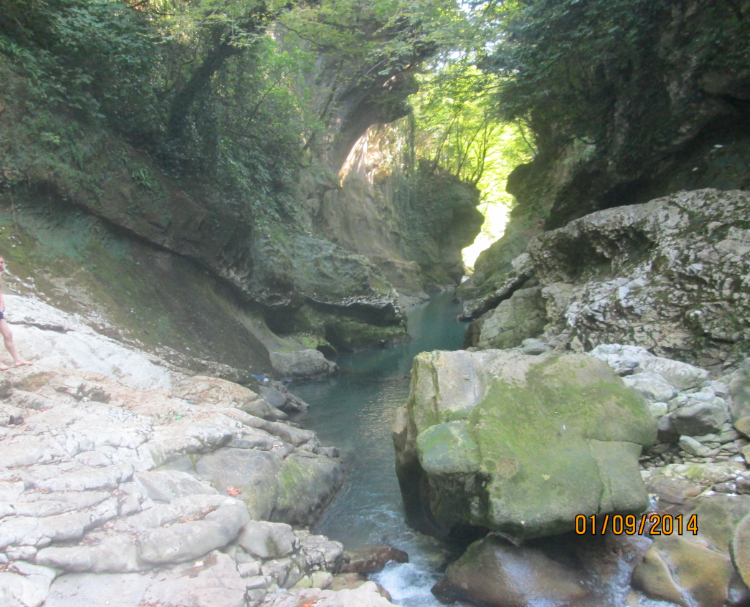
- Gachedili's canyon

- Location in Georgia Gachedili (Samegrelo-Zemo Svaneti)
- Coordinates: 42°28′05″N 42°22′15″E
- Country: Georgia
- Region: Samegrelo-Zemo Svaneti
- Municipality: Martvili
- Elevation: 240 m (790 ft)

Population (2014)
  - Total: 427
- Time zone: UTC+4 (Georgian time)

Gachedili (Georgian: გაჭედილი; Mingrelian: გოჭკადილი) is a village located in the Martvili Municipality of the Samegrelo-Zemo Svaneti region in Georgia. Gachedili is situated on the right bank of the Abasha river. At an altitude of 240 meters, it is 8 kilometers to Martvili from Gachedili and 48 kilometers to Senaki. According to the data of 2014, 427 people live in the village. Gachedili is under Chkondidi Diocese.

== Canyon ==
Gachedili's Canyon is located on the river Abasha. The canyon is 2400 m. long and - 20–40 m. deep. In the middle of canyon is a 12 m high waterfall. The canyon is known for fossilized bones of animals, which lived 75 million years ago, making the canyon the world's third discovery, in which the remains of prehistoric animals were found. This discovery was made in July 2010, by Ilia State University International Institute of Earth Sciences with the help of graduate students. In August Ilia State University organized Field Research Expedition in which paleontologists Vyacheslav Chkhikvadze and Vasil Gabunia took part. After the expedition it was announced that dinosaur footprints were found in the gorge of the Abasha river . On October 4, 2010 Gachedili Canyon was declared protected area. In 2011 Ilia state university organized a number of re-exploration expeditions. In some caves oldest human remains - bones and crumbs were found. In addition, they found the bones of extinct species of animals, including a cave bear and a bison. One of the participants of the expeditions Vasil Gabunia says that discovered footprints look like dinosaur's, although he admits that it is difficult to say confidently, until they make research of the discovered material.
