= Abasha (disambiguation) =

Abasha is a town in Georgia.

Abasha may also refer to:

- Abasha Municipality, a municipality in Georgia
- Abasha (river), in Georgia
- Abasha, a variant name of Abyssinia
- Abasha, a variant name of the Habesha people
- Abasha, a snack in Nigeria made of cassava chips
- Abasha, a diminutive form of "Abakum", a variant of the Russian male first name Avvakum
