= Balda Canyon Natural Monument =

- Baldi Canyon Natural Monument
- IUCN category III (natural monument or feature)
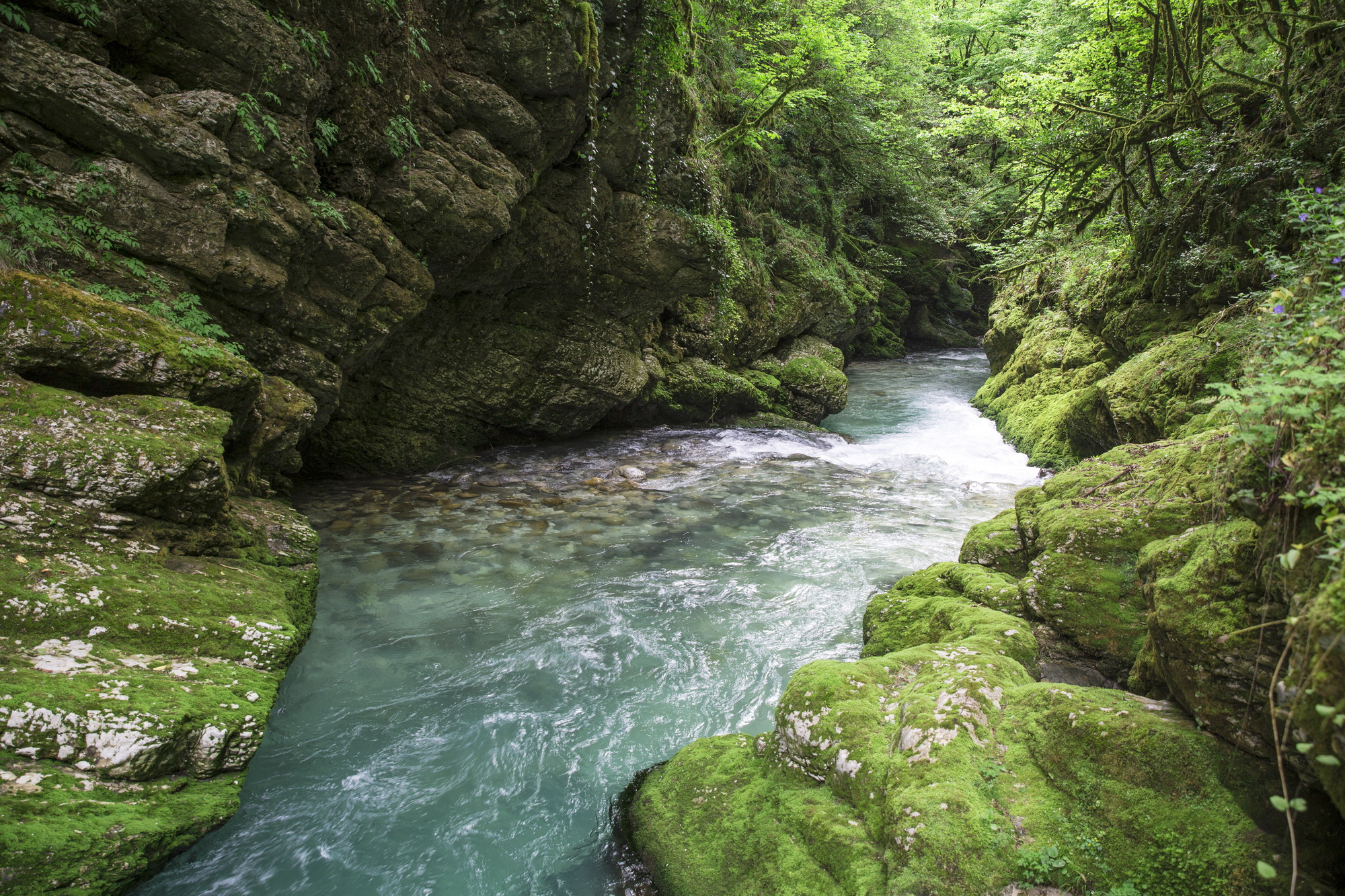
- Balda canyon.

- Location within Georgia Location within Samegrelo-Zemo Svaneti
- Location: Georgia
- Coordinates: 42°29′19.2″N 42°24′34.8″E
- Area: 0.15 km^{2} (0.058 sq mi)
- Established: 2013
- Governing body: Agency of Protected Areas
- Website: Baldi Canyon Natural Monument

Balda Canyon Natural Monument (Georgian: ბალდის კანიონი) is an Abasha gorge located in Samegrelo region of Western Georgia in Martvili Municipality near village Second Balda and Balda Monastery of St. Mary's Assumption, 295 meters above sea level. Canyon created by limestone rocks in the southern part of the Ashkah massif by the Abasha River. Baldi Canyon is 1400 m long, 5-10 m wide and 25-30 m deep.

== Privatization and protests ==
In the 2022-2024 period, Balda Canyon was subject to prolonged protests by locals and environmental activists after the government decided to sell development and management rights on the natural preserve a private company. Protesters have complained of retributions against them for their activities, with some protesters being stabbed and assaulted.

== See also ==
- List of natural monuments of Georgia
- Abasha (river)
- River Abasha Waterfall Natural Monument
- Gachedili Canyon Natural Monument
