= Marani, Georgia =

Marani Georgian: მარანი
- Village
- Location in Georgia Marani (Georgia)
- Coordinates: 42°9′30″N 42°17′10″E
- Country: (Georgia (country)) Georgia
- Region: Samegrelo-Zemo Svaneti
- Municipality: Abasha Municipality
- Elevation: 16 m (52 ft)

Population (2014)
  - Total: 1,153
- Time zone: UTC+4 (Georgian Time)

Marani (Georgian: მარანი) is a village in Abasha Municipality of Georgia. It is situated on the right bank of Tskhenis-Tsqali river, which serves as a border between Abasha and Samtredia Municipalities. Population: 1153 (2014 census).

== See also ==
- Samegrelo-Zemo Svaneti
