= Alertkari =

Village in Zugdidi Municipality, Georgia

Alertkari ალერტკარი
- Village
- Location in Georgia Alertkari (Samegrelo-Zemo Svaneti)
- Coordinates: 42°32′03″N 41°58′22″E
- Country: Georgia
- Mkhare: Samegrelo-Zemo Svaneti
- Municipality: Zugdidi
- Elevation: 220 ft (67 m)

Population (2014)
  - Total: 509
- Demonym: Alertkarali
- Time zone: UTC+4 (Georgian Time)

Alertkari (Georgian and Mingrelian: ალერტკარი; till February 2, 2018 was called Grigolishi) is a village in the Zugdidi Municipality of Samegrelo-Zemo Svaneti region of western Georgia. Situated 12 km north-east of the city Zugdidi. There is a 19th-century church in the village. Tea growing was developed during the Soviet period. During the Soviet period, it was called Grigolish, i.e. "Grigoli's village" in the Mingrelian language, in honor of the Bolshevik Grigol Rogava. In 2018, the old name was returned.

== See also ==
- Samegrelo-Zemo Svaneti
