= Nokalakevi =

Village in Senaki, Georgia

- ნოქალაქევი (Georgian)
- Tsikhegoji, Archaeopolis
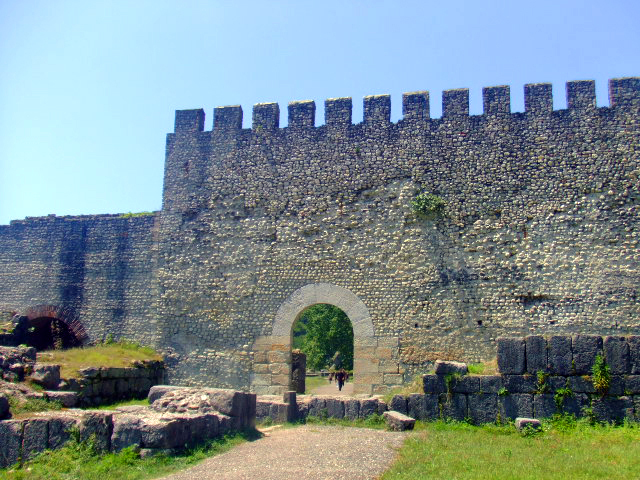
- The eastern fortifications of Nokalakevi

- Location within Georgia
- 42°21′26″N 42°11′38″E
- Type: Settlement
- Periods: Hellenistic to Early Byzantine
- Location: Senaki, Samegrelo-Zemo Svaneti, Georgia

Site notes
- Area: 20 ha (49 acres)

Map of the kingdom of Lazica

Nokalakevi (Georgian: ნოქალაქევი), locally known as Nokalaku (Mingrelian: ნოქალაქუ) and according to some sources as "Djikha Kvinji" or "Jikhankuji" (Mingrelian: ჯიხანქუჯი), also known as Archaeopolis (Ancient Greek: Ἀρχαιόπολις, "Old City") and Tsikhegoji (in Georgian "Fortress of Kuji"), is a village and archaeological site in the Senaki municipality, Samegrelo-Zemo Svaneti region, Georgia.

== History ==
Located by the Tekhuri River, on the northern edge of the Colchian plain in Samegrelo, western Georgia, lie the ruins of Nokalakevi. Occupying approximately 20ha, the site was known to early Byzantine historians as Archæopolis, and to the neighbouring Georgian (Kartlian) chroniclers as Tsikhegoji, or the fortress of Kuji — a Colchian ruler or eristavi. The fortress is located 15 km from the modern town of Senaki on the Martvili road, and would have commanded an important crossing point of the river Tekhuri, at the junction with a strategic route that still winds through the neighbouring hills to Chkhorotsqu in central Samegrelo. Nokalakevi-Archaeopolis played a part in the major wars fought between the Byzantine Empire and Sasanians in the South Caucasus during the sixth century AD. It was one of the key fortresses guarding Lazika (modern Mingrelia) from Sasanian, Persian and Iberian (East Georgian/Kartlian) attack. During the war of AD 540-562, the Persians' failure to take Nokalakevi-Archaeopolis from the Byzantines and the Laz eventually cost them control of Lazika.

The early Byzantine defensive fortifications of Nokalakevi-Archaeopolis take advantage of the site's position within a loop of the river Tekhuri, which has carved a gorge through the local limestone to the west of the fortress. The steep and rugged terrain to the north of the site made the citadel established there almost unassailable. A wall connected this 'upper town' to the 'lower town' below, where excavations have revealed stone buildings of the fourth to sixth century AD. Beneath these late Roman period layers there is evidence of several earlier phases of occupation and abandonment, from the eighth to second centuries BC.

== Archaeological work at the site ==
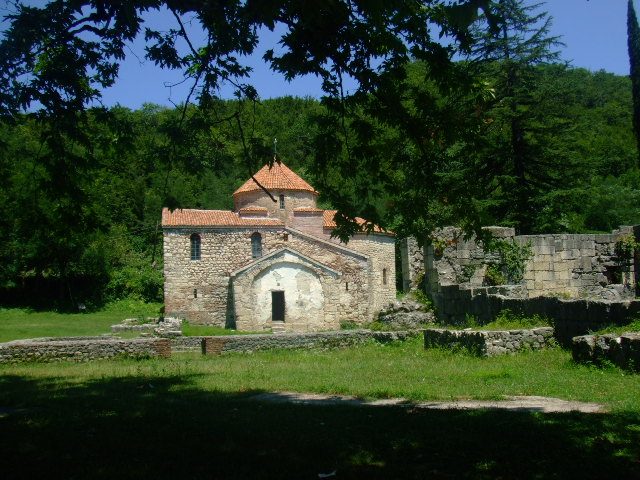
The Forty Martyrs Church at Nokalakevi

Modern study of the site began in the decades before the formal Russian annexation of Samegrelo, with a visit by the Swiss philologist Frédéric Dubois de Montpéreux in 1833-4. He identified the ruins as the Archaeopolis of Byzantine historians and argued that the site was Aia, the ancient Colchian capital of the Greek Argonaut myth. This stimulated scholarly interest, which culminated in the 1920s with proposals for an archaeological excavation. In the winter of 1930-31, a joint German-Georgian team, led by Dr Alfonse-Maria Schneider of Freiburg University, traced the line of the walls and excavated about 40 survey trenches and one of the towers, as well as what they erroneously believed to be the agora in the 'lower' town. Their findings — including a hoard of gold solidi of the Emperor Maurice (AD 584-602) — confirmed Dubois de Montpéreux's identification of the site with Archaeopolis, without settling the question of Aia. Most scholars continued (and continue) to prefer the traditional identification of Aia with Kutaisi.

The political upheavals of the 1930s and the onset of war interrupted further archaeological excavation. Nevertheless, interest in Georgia's history continued to grow, prompting various scholarly visits and articles about Nokalakevi from the 1930s to the 1960s (see for a discussion of previous work at Nokalakevi). Finally in 1973 a major state-sponsored expedition was set up, headed by Parmen Zakaraia. This expedition undertook major excavations and conservation work at Nokalakevi until the early 1990s when the collapse of the Soviet Union and the civil disturbances of Georgia's early years of independence brought a halt to funding and serious damage to the expedition's infrastructure

Large-scale excavations were resumed in 2001 with a collaborative project, founded by Professor David Lomitashvili, of the S. Janashia State History Museum (now the Georgian National Museum) and Ian Colvin of Cambridge University. Since then Lomitashvili has been appointed Deputy Director of the National Agency for Cultural Heritage Preservation of Georgia, and Dr Nikoloz Murgulia became the head of the Georgian National Museum's Nokalakevi Expedition. The British side of the Anglo-Georgian Expedition to Nokalakevi (AGEN) is co-directed by Ian Colvin and Dr Paul Everill. It celebrated its twentieth anniversary in 2020.

== See also ==
- Samegrelo-Zemo Svaneti
