= River Abasha Waterfall Natural Monument =

- IUCN category III (natural monument or feature)
- River Abasha on Georgia map.

- Location within Samegrelo-Zemo Svaneti
- Nearest city: village Kurzu of Martvili Municipality
- Coordinates: 42°30.832′N 42°28.558′E
- Area: 0.09 km^{2} (0.035 sq mi)
- Website: Abasha River Waterfall Natural Monument

River Abasha Waterfall Natural Monument (Georgian: მდ. აბაშის ჩანჩქერის ბუნების ძეგლი) is a waterfall at the source of Abasha River with a height of 30 m at 630 m above sea level in Martvili Municipality, Samegrelo-Zemo Svaneti region of Georgia.

The waterfall is on the top of huge limestone rock described as Late Cretaceous deposits, in the south-western section of Askhi Limestone Massif. It creates a hole with a diameter of 12 m at the point of fall. It is one of the distinguished waterfalls in Georgia for its aesthetic qualities as well as ecological potential.

The main waterfall stream is accompanied by two streams to the right side and one small waterfall stream to the left. Abasha waterfall joins the Abasha river from the left bank of the river. The areas in the vicinity of the waterfall and Abasha river banks are covered with dense forests. The climate in the vicinity of Abasha Waterfall is humid subtropical. The waterfall itself creates a microclimate which supports characteristic flora and fauna.

== See also ==
- Abasha (river)
- Balda Canyon Natural Monument
- Gachedili Canyon Natural Monument
