= Tekhuri =

River in Georgia

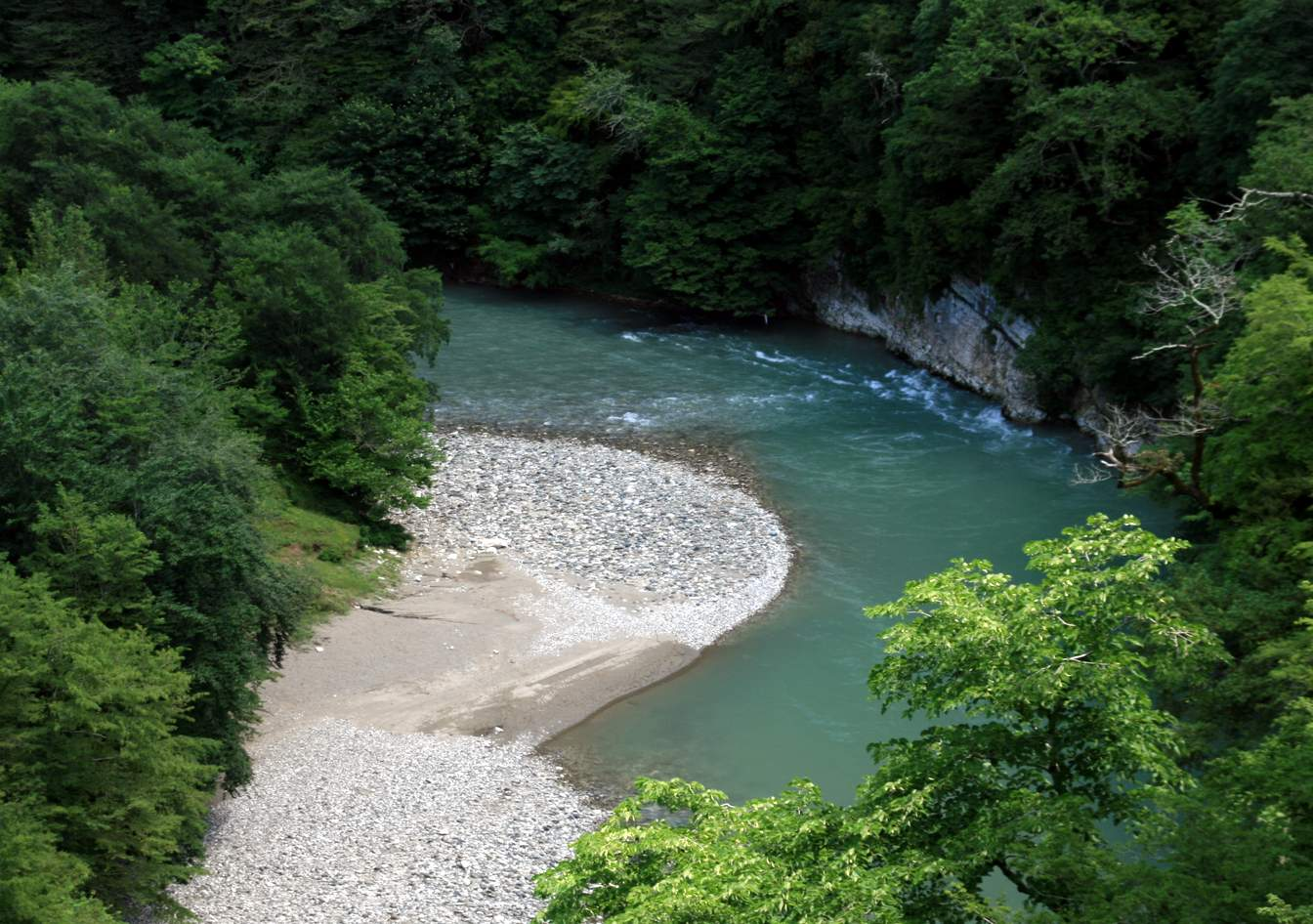
- The Tekhuri near Nokalakevi

- Location within Georgia Location within Samegrelo-Zemo Svaneti
- Native name: ტეხური (Georgian)

Location
- Country: Georgia

Physical characteristics
- Source
  - coordinates: 42.752362°N 42.437167°E
- Mouth: Rioni
  - coordinates: 42.1860°N 42.0329°E
- Length: 101 km (63 mi)
- Basin size: 1,040 km^{2} (400 sq mi)

Basin features
- Progression: Rioni→ Black Sea

The Tekhuri (Georgian: ტეხური, Megrelian: ტეხირი t'ekhiri) is a right tributary of the river Rioni in Georgia.

The Tekhuri rises in the Egrisi Range below the 3002 m high summit Tekhurishdudi. It flows through the region Samegrelo-Zemo Svaneti in a predominantly south-south-west direction. In the middle course it flows past the place Salkhino near Martvili. Finally it reaches the Colchian Plain, flows southeast of the city Senaki and turns south. Shortly afterwards the Abasha meets the Tekhuri from the left. After another 10 km the Tekhuri flows into the Rioni. It is 101 km (63 mi) long, and has a drainage basin of 1,040 km^{2} (400 sq mi).

== Fauna ==
River has plenty of fish. There are many important game fish, including: bleak (Alburnus), common barbel (Barbus barbus), barbel (Chondrostoma nasus), chub, luciobarbus mursa. Tekhuri also contains trouts, but the Georgian legislation prohibits fishing for this species.
