= Abasha (river) =

River in Georgia

Abasha Abashistskali, Abashatskari
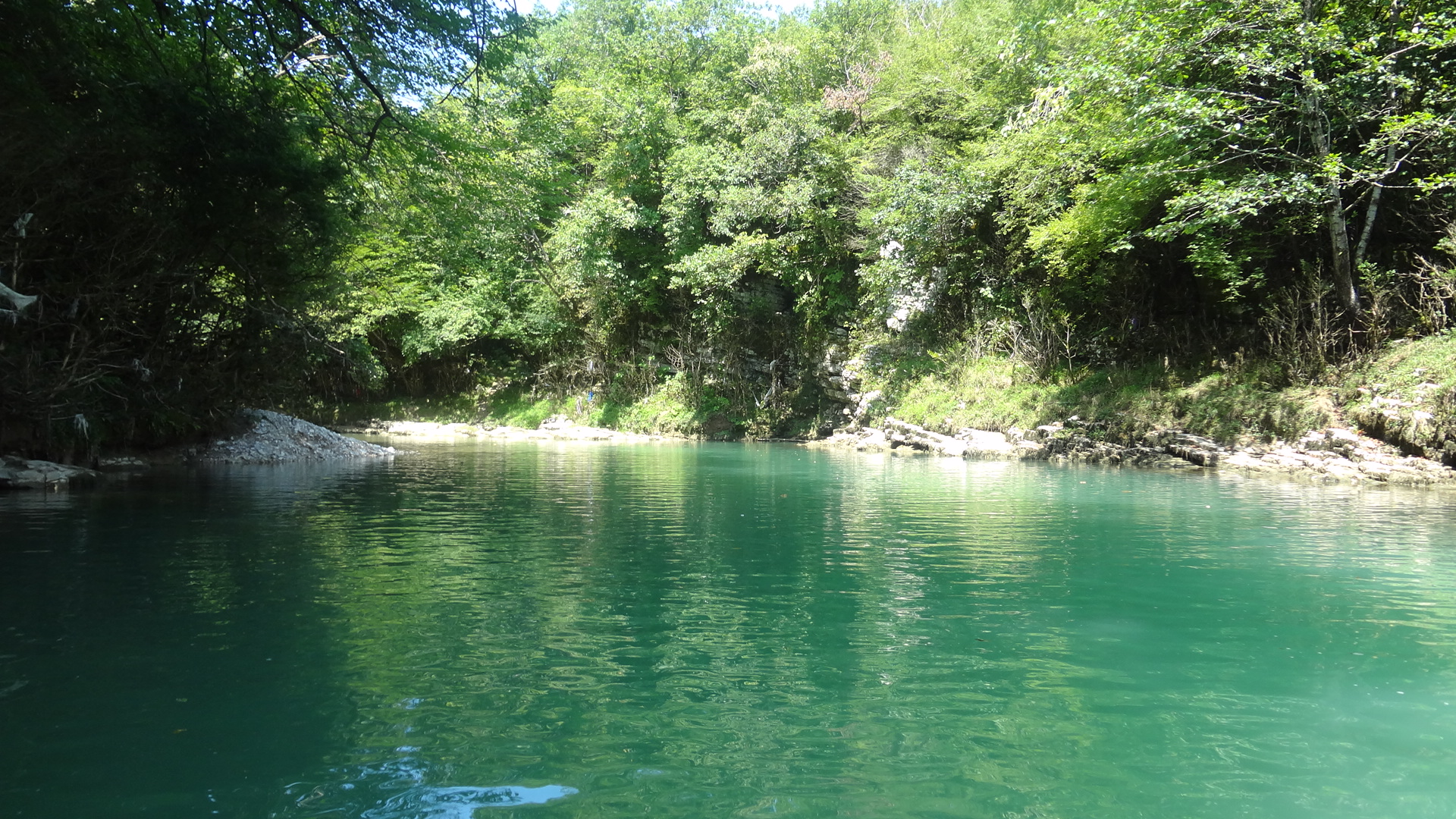
- The Abasha at the village of Gachedili

- Location within Georgia Location within Samegrelo-Zemo Svaneti
- Native name: აბაშა (Georgian)

Location
- Country: Georgia

Physical characteristics
- Source
  - coordinates: 42°32′54″N 42°30′16″E
- Mouth: Tekhuri
  - coordinates: 42°12′15″N 42°05′05″E
- Length: 66 km (41 mi)

Basin features
- Progression: Tekhuri→ Rioni→ Black Sea

The Abasha (Georgian: აბაშა, Mingrelian: აბაშა), also known as the Abashistskali (Georgian: აბაშისწყალი) or Abashatskari (Mingrelian: აბაშაწყარი) is a river in western Georgia, running for 66 kilometres (41 mi) in the municipalities of Martvili and Abasha, Samegrelo-Zemo Svaneti region. Its catchment area is 370 square kilometres (140 mi^{2}).

== Geography ==
The Abasha river begins at the confluence of the mountain streams Rachkhitskali and Toba, near the village of Baldi, at 325 metres (1,066 ft) above sea level, and meets the Tekhuri as its left tributary.

The Abasha forms a narrow canyon near the village of Gachedili (Gochkadili), where the Abasha hydroelectric power station was built in 1928. In July 2010, an expedition from Ilia State University discovered footprints of the herbivorous dinosaurs as well as ammonites, brachiopods, and sea urchins dating from the Late Cretaceous (100.5–65.5 Ma). In October 2010, the Gachedili canyon was made a protected area by the government of Georgia.

== Etymology and history ==
The legendary etymology of the hydronym "Abasha" is found in the 11th-century History of King Vakhtang Gorgasali, part of the Georgian Chronicles, which, relating the story of the Arab invasion of 735, claims that the flooding river afflicted the "Abash" contingent of the invading army, being subsequently named Abasha after this event. Modern scholars see the hydronym as a compound of the male given name Aba and the adjectival suffix -shi or, alternatively, the Persian-derived word, ab (آب, "water") plus the diminutive -cha.

The Abasha traversed one of the principal districts of historical western Georgia. The important medieval church establishment of Chqondidi was located in the Abasha valley. In the 18th and 19th centuries, a southeastern district of the Principality of Mingrelia was sometimes referred to as Abasha after the river.

== See also ==
- River Abasha Waterfall Natural Monument
- Balda Canyon Natural Monument
- Gachedili Canyon Natural Monument
