= Senaki Municipality =

Municipality in Samegrelo-Zemo Svaneti, Georgia

Coordinates: 42.2689°N 42.0792°E

Senaki Municipality სენაკის მუნიციპალიტეტი
- Municipality
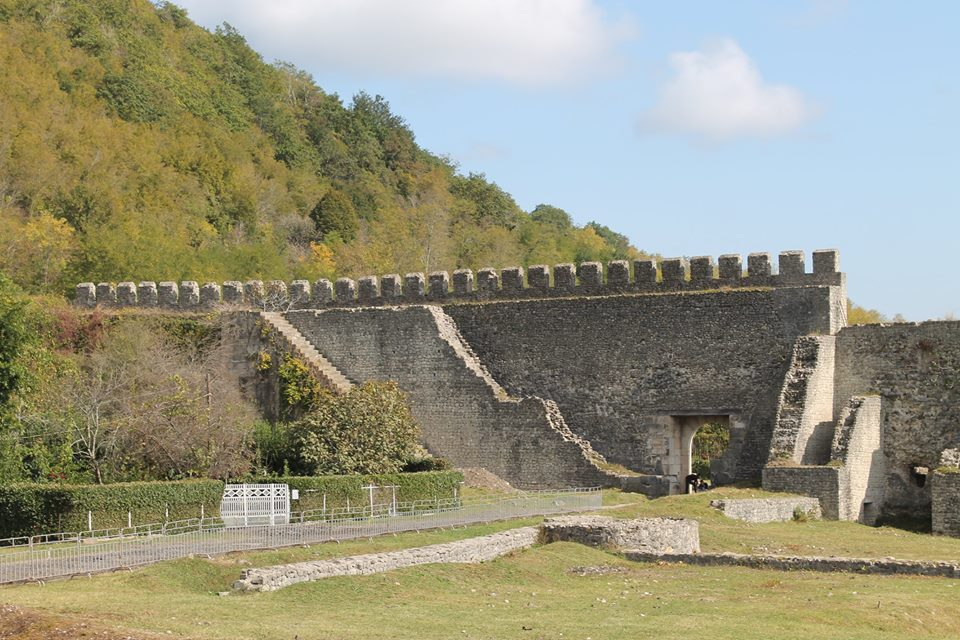
- Fence of Nokalakevi

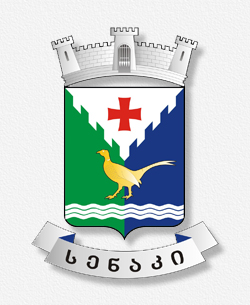
- Flag Seal

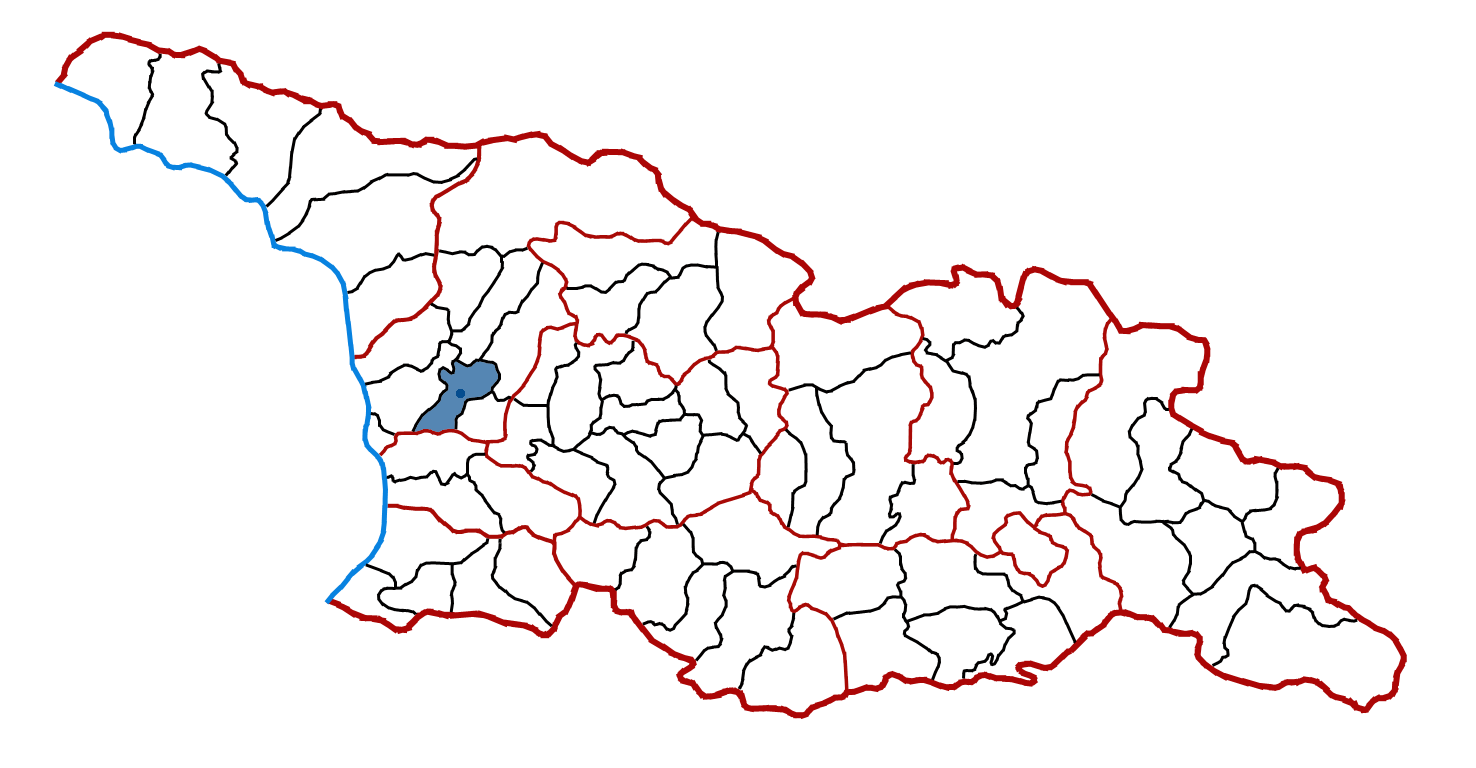
- Location of the municipality within Georgia
- Country: Georgia
- Region: Samegrelo-Zemo Svaneti
- Administrative centre: Senaki

Government
  - Body: Senaki Municipal Assembly
  - Mayor: Vakhtang Gadelia (GD)

Area
  - Total: 520.7 km^{2} (201.0 sq mi)

Population (2014)
  - Total: 39 652
  - Density: 76.15/km^{2} (197.2/sq mi)

Population by ethnicity
  - Georgians: 99,56 %
  - Russians: 0,15 %
  - Armenians: 0,10 %
  - Ukrainians: 0.06 %
  - Assyrians: 0.06 %
- Time zone: UTC+4 (Georgian Standard Time)
- Website: senaki.gov.ge

Senaki (Georgian: სენაკის მუნიციპალიტეტი) is a district of Georgia, in the region of Samegrelo-Zemo Svaneti. Its main town is Senaki.

It has an area of 521 km^{2} and had a population of 39,652 as of the 2014 census.

== Politics ==
Senaki Municipal Assembly (Georgian: სენაკის საკრებულო) is a representative body in Senaki Municipality, consisting of 33 members which is elected every four years. The last election was held in October 2021. Vakhtang Gadelia of Georgian Dream was elected mayor through a 2nd round against a candidate of the United National Movement.

Senaki was one of just seven municipalities where ruling Georgian Dream lost its majority in the sakrebulo, five of which in Samegrelo.

A protracted local political crisis ensued over the election of the chairperson of the sakrebulo, eventually resulting in a majoritarian UNM council member to abandon his mandate, and the central election commission calling for a by-election in one of the districts. The election was boycotted by the opposition parties, resulting in the election of the Georgian Dream candidate with 96.7% on 1 October 2022, at the expense of a (former) UNM seat, tilting the balance of political power in the sakrebulo

Party	2017	2021	Current Municipal Assembly
Georgian Dream	26	17 (Note: GD won Senaki by-elections and gained one more seat at the expense of UNM.)	
United National Movement	4	12	
For Georgia		4	
European Georgia	2		
Alliance of Patriots	1		
Total	33	33	

== Administrative divisions ==
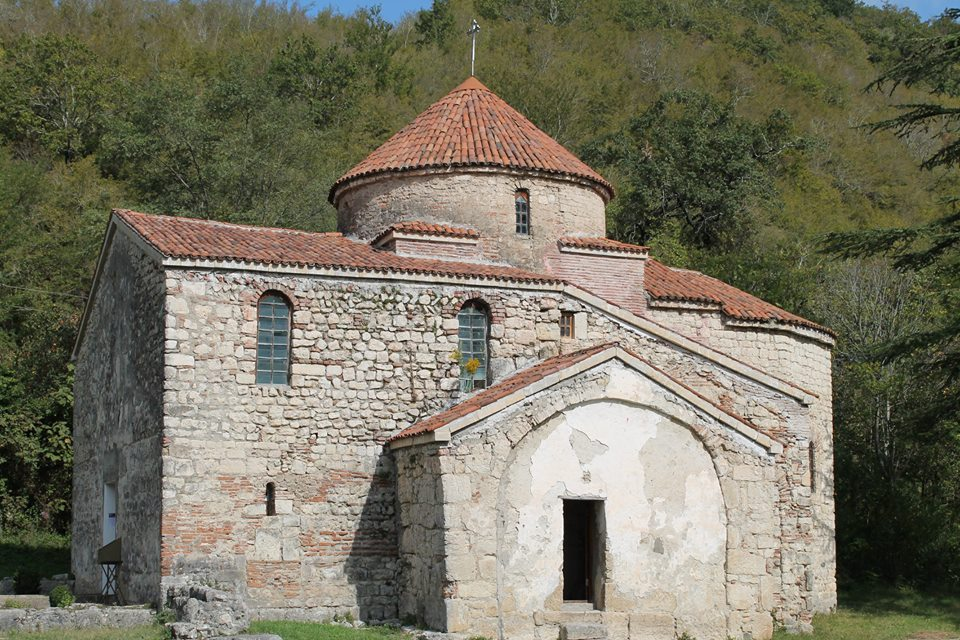
Church of 40 martyr

Senaki municipality is administratively divided into one city, 14 communities (თემი, temi), and 61 villages (სოფელი, sopeli):

=== Cities ===
- Senaki

=== Communities ===
- Akhalsopeli
- Gejeti
- Eki
- Zani
- Zemo Chaladidi
- Teklati
- Ledzadzame
- Menji
- Nosiri
- Nokalakevi
- Ushapati
- Potskho
- Dzveli Senaki
- Khorshi

== Twin towns – sister Municipalities ==
- Bila Tserkva, Ukraine
- Rakvere, Estonia

== See also ==
- List of municipalities in Georgia (country)
