= Egrisi Range =

Mountain range in Caucasia

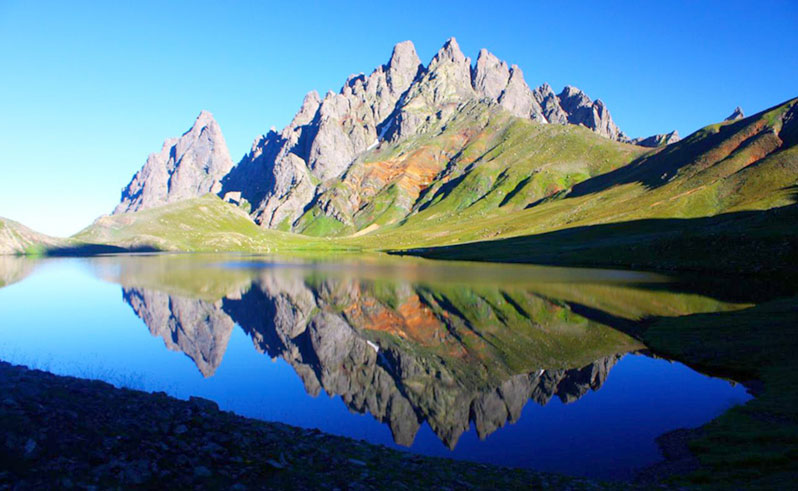
- Egrisi Range with Tobavarchkhili Lake in the foreground

Highest point
- Elevation: 3,226 m (10,584 ft)

Dimensions
- Length: 62 km (39 mi)
- Width: 37 km (23 mi)

Geography
- Location within Samegrelo-Zemo Svaneti Location within Georgia
- Country: Georgia
- Range coordinates: 42°42′30″N 42°36′42″E
- Parent range: Caucasus Mountains

Egrisi Range (Georgian: ეგრისის ქედი), also known as the Samegrelo Range (სამეგრელოს ქედი) or the Odishi Range (ოდიშის ქედი), is an east–west mountain range that runs parallel to the Greater Caucasus Mountain Range in the Samegrelo-Zemo Svaneti region of Georgia. The Range is connected to the Greater Caucasus Mountain Range via the Svaneti Range. The length of the Egrisi Range is 62 kilometres (39 miles) and the width is 37 kilometres (23 miles). The Range is bounded by the Tskhenistsqali River Valley to the east and the Enguri River Valley to the west.

The highest point of the Egrisi Range is Mount Chitagvala which rises to an elevation of 3,226 meters (10,584 feet) above sea level. Peaks that exceed 3,000 meters (9,800 feet) in elevation include Tsalmagi, Tekhurishdudi, Lakumurashdudi, Didghalidudi, Otepura and others. The name of the range is derived from the early medieval Georgian region of Egrisi, roughly equivalent to the Colchis of Classical Antiquity.

== Geology ==
Most of the Egrisi Range is composed of porphyritic rock that dates back to the Jurassic Age. The southern periphery of the Range consists of Triassic limestones. There are many karst massives and caves in this portion of the Mountains. There are small glaciers and traces (remnants) of old glaciers at the highest elevations of the Range. The glacial lake Tobavarchkhili is located at an elevation of 2,643 meters (8,671 feet) above sea level. Other lakes include Okhoja and Didi Tobavarchkhili.

== Climate ==
The southern slopes receive precipitation in excess of 2,000 millimetres (79 inches) per year, with some of the higher peaks receiving precipitation that exceeds 3,000 millimetres (120 inches). The northern slopes of the Egrisi Range receive 1,500–2,000 millimetres (59–79 inches) of annual precipitation. Most of the mountains are covered by significant amounts of snow in the colder months. Many locations reach snow depths of 2 meters (6.6 feet) or more, with the highest elevations of the Range recording snow depths in the 3–5 m (9.8–16.4 ft) range.

In the center of the Range near the head of the Tekhuri river at an elevation of 1600 meters is the Lebarde balneological resort. It was originally set up in the Soviet era, but has since been more or less abandoned, operating with limited infrastructure. In 2019 a new road leading to Lebarde was announced for further development of the area with sanatoriums, hotels and ropeways.

== Vegetation ==
The slopes of the Egrisi Range are mainly covered by Colchian Deciduous forests consisting of oak, beech, chestnut and hornbeam up to an elevation of 1,200 meters (3,900 feet) above sea level. Coniferous forests that are made up of Nordmann Fir and Oriental Spruce take over from 1,200 meters (3,900 feet) and reach elevations of 2,100 meters (6,900 feet) above sea level. The endemic and endangered Megrelian birch (Betula megrelica) grows in a few locations in the mountains. A significant portion of Georgia's temperate rain forests are located within the Egrisi Range. The highest reaches of the Range are covered by subalpine and alpine meadows.
