= Sasha Gegechkori =

Aleksi "Sasha" Gegechkori
- ალექსი "საშა" გეგეჭკორი
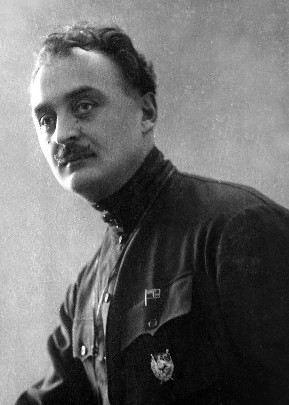
- Aleksi Gegechkori in 1927
- Born: November 23, 1887; Village of Naogalezi, Senaki uezd, Kutaisi Governorate, Russian Empire
- Died: June 7, 1928 (aged 40); Tiflis, Georgian SSR, Soviet Union

Aleksi "Sasha" Gegechkori (Georgian: ალექსი "საშა" გეგეჭკორი; Russian: Алексей Александрович "Саша" Гегечкори, Aleksey Aleksandrovich Gegechkori) (23 November 1887 – 7 June 1928) was a Georgian Bolshevik activist involved in Sovietization of Georgia in 1921.

Born of a noble family, Gegechkori joined the revolutionary underground in 1902 and the Bolshevik party in 1908.

In 1918 he led a band of 300 pro-Bolshevik peasants in a guerrilla revolt against the Democratic Republic of Georgia in the mountains of Racha and Lechkhumi (northwest Georgia). After the failure of this revolt, Gegechkori fought in the ranks of the Soviet Russian Red Army against the White movement in the Terek area where he was severely wounded and had his leg amputated.

Returning to Georgia, Gegechkori was arrested by Georgian police in October 1919 and tried for a treason and armed revolt. However, upon the request of Russian government and in accordance to the Russo-Georgian peace treaty of 1920, Gegechkori was released from prison. When the Red Armies eventually attacked Georgia in February 1921, Gegechkori joined the "Georgian Revolutionary Committee" and headed its division in Tbilisi, Georgia's capital.

From 1922 to 1922 he served as a People's Commissar for Internal Affairs of the Georgian SSR and presided over a crackdown on Georgian anti-Soviet opposition.

In 1924 he was moved to the post of People's Commissar for Agriculture. At the same time, he served as a deputy chairman of the Council of Georgia's People's Commissars.

In 1928 he committed suicide at his home in Tbilisi, reputedly under pressure of the Soviet security officer Lavrenty Beria who had spent several months in prison with Gegechkori in 1920 and married his niece, Nina Gegechkori in 1921.

His native town of Martvili was named Gegechkori after him from 1936 to 1990.
