= Odishi-Guria plain =

Coordinates: 42°21′N 42°17′E

The Odishi-Guria plain also known as Odishi-Guria lowland and Odishi Plateau (Georgian: ოდიშის ვაკე) is a plain in the middle part of Samegrelo in western Georgia from the bottom of the Egrisi Range to the northern edge of the Colchis lowland. To the south, it is bordered by the Urta-Bis and Unagiri lakes, partly limestone, brachytic-clastic, hillsides. Odishi Plateau height is in the range 150–450 m.

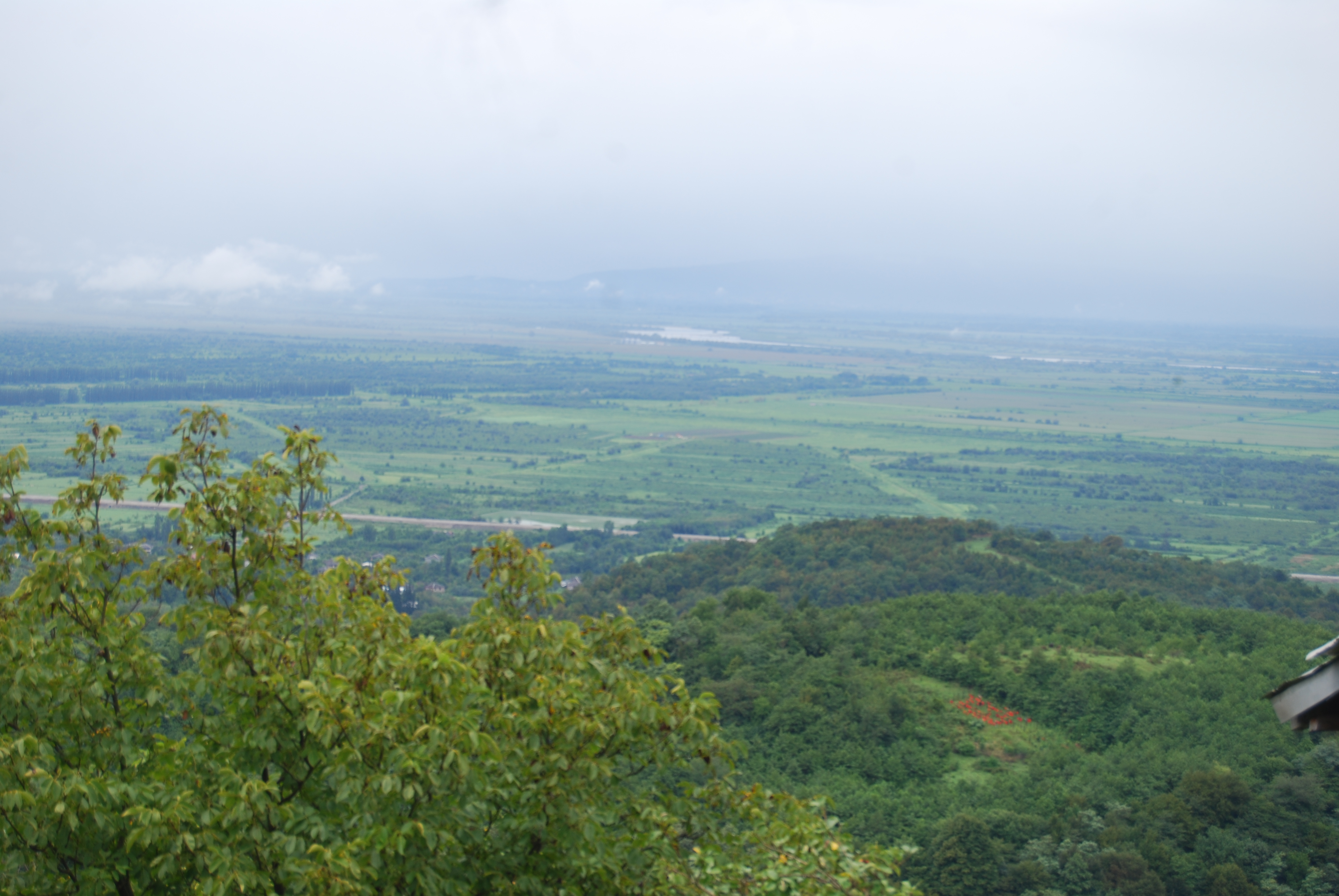
Odishi-Guria Lowland.

== Geography ==
Odishi-Guria plain has an elaborated network of rivers. There are a few uninhabited areas with deciduous forest-shrub foliage and wide sections of valleys linked to drainage basin. The agricultural landscape prevails over the plains. Odishi-Guria plain encompasses the central, lowest part of the Colchis Landscape District, which lies on its western side by the Black Sea. It is characterized by Quaternary age and modern terrain with swampy surface, coastal-marine sediments, subtropical climate, tight hydrographic network, wetlands, mesophilic and hydrophilic vegetation development. The surface, especially in its seaside part, is characterized by intense moisture.

Odishi-Guria plain is crossed by Enguri, Khobi, Rioni, Tekhuri and Abasha rivers. It also has many local streams that entirely run within the plain: Tikori, Churia River, Tsia, Tsivi, and Pichori rivers. As a result of excess accumulation of wet material, the riverbeds of these rivers are relatively elevated in some places above the surface of the adjoining floodplains. Some of the riverbeds (Jumi, Khobi, Itia, Cold, Technique, Abasha, Pichori and others) along the western side of the plain and along the right bank of the Rioni River are of varying intensity and are characterized by the development of meanders.

There are lakes. Some of them are caverns of the former sea area and are characterized by small depths (paliastom, wide water, mulch, harkalu), while others developed in a meadows abandoned by rivers. Locals call such lakes "Narionals".

== Flora ==
Vegetation is divided into several types. On a relatively dry, well-drained and saline surface of sandy dunes stretching along the coastline, where the main meadow cordon-sandy soils are developed, there are distinct peculiar, glorified groups of other Colchian vegetation. They are represented by plant groups of lithotal pseudophytes (milky, blue nar, etc.), bollworms (sea lily, etc.), colchicine isles, Imeretian mace, Glerta, perennial xerophytic shrubs (blackberry, hawthorn, hornbeam). As a result of human economic impacts, the natural structure of these groups has been severely degraded over a significant portion of the dunes and replaced by artificial forests.

== See also ==
- Odishi
- Guria
