= Mingrelian language =

Kartvelian language of western Georgia

Mingrelian
- მარგალური ნინა margaluri nina
- Native to: Georgia
- Region: Mingrelia; Abkhazia
- Native speakers: 345,530 (2015)
- Language family: Kartvelian: Karto-Zan; Zan; Mingrelian
- Writing system: Georgian script

Language codes
- ISO 639-3: xmf
- Glottolog: ming1252
- ELP: Mingrelian

- Mingrelian is classified as Definitely Endangered by the UNESCO Atlas of the World's Languages in Danger.

Valerian speaking Mingrelian

The Mingrelian or Megrelian language (მარგალური ნინა margaluri nina) is a Kartvelian language spoken in Western Georgia (namely the regions of Mingrelia and Abkhazia) and to a lesser extent throughout the country. It is used primarily by Mingrelians, a subgroup of Georgians.

Mingrelian has historically been only a spoken, regional language used informally in day-to-day activities. Mingrelian speakers have traditionally relied on the standard Georgian as their literary language and through the late 19th century there were no known written Mingrelian grammar books or dictionaries. There have been some limited publications in Mingrelian throughout the 20th and 21st centuries, but producing or translating written works into Mingrelian is controversial because it is seen as a deviation from its historic profile as a non-literary language.

The number of people speaking Mingrelian has been steadily declining in favor of standard Georgian, with UNESCO designating Mingrelian as a "definitely endangered language".

== Distribution and status ==
Mingrelian-speaking population

No reliable figure exists for the number of native speakers of Mingrelian, but it is estimated to be between 300,000 and 500,000. Most speakers live in the Mingrelia (or Samegrelo and formerly Odishi) region of Georgia, which comprises the Odishi Hills and the Colchis Lowlands, from the Black Sea coast to the Svan Mountains and the Tskhenistskali River. Smaller enclaves existed in Abkhazia, but the ongoing civil unrest there has displaced many Mingrelian speakers to other regions of Georgia. Their geographical distribution is relatively compact, which has helped to promote the transmission of the language between generations.

Mingrelian is generally written in the Georgian alphabet, but it has no written standard or official status. Almost all speakers are bilingual; they use Mingrelian mainly for familiar and informal conversation, and Georgian (or, for expatriate speakers, the local official language) for other purposes.

== History ==
Mingrelian is one of the Kartvelian languages. It is closely related to Laz, from which it has become differentiated mostly in the past 500 years, after the northern (Mingrelian) and southern (Laz) communities were separated by Turkic invasions. It is less closely related to Georgian, the two branches having separated in the first millennium BC or earlier, and even more distantly related to Svan, which is believed to have branched off in the 2nd millennium BC or earlier. Mingrelian is mutually intelligible only with Laz.

Some linguists refer to Mingrelian and Laz as Zan languages. Zan had already split into Mingrelian and Laz variants by early modern times, however, and it is not customary to speak of a unified Zan language today.

The oldest surviving texts in Mingrelian date from the 19th century, and are mainly items of ethnographical literature. The earliest linguistic studies of Mingrelian include a phonetic analysis by Aleksandre Tsagareli (1880), and grammars by Ioseb Kipshidze (1914) and Shalva Beridze (1920). From 1930 to 1938 several newspapers were published in Mingrelian, such as Kazakhishi Gazeti, Komuna, Samargalosh Chai, Narazenish Chai, and Samargalosh Tutumi. More recently, there has been some revival of the language, with the publication of a Mingrelian–Georgian dictionary by Otar Kajaia, a Mingrelian-German dictionary by Otar Kajaia and Heinz Fähnrich, and books of poems by Lasha Gakharia, Edem Izoria, Lasha Gvasalia, Guri Otobaia, Giorgi Sichinava, Jumber Kukava, and Vakhtang Kharchilava, journal Skani, Mingrelian Wikipedia, as well as books and magazines published by Jehovah's Witnesses.

== Phonology ==
=== Vowels ===
Mingrelian has five vowel phonemes /i ɛ a ɔ u/. The Zugdidi-Samurzaqano dialect has a sixth /ə/ which is the result of assimilation of /i/ and /u/.

Mingrelian vowels
	Front	Back	
	Front	unrounded	rounded
High	i [i] ი		u [u] უ
Mid	e [ɛ] ე	(ə [ə]) ჷ	o [ɔ] ო
Low		a [ɑ] ა	

=== Consonants ===
The consonant inventory of Mingrelian contains series of aspirated and ejective consonants that contrast with voiced consonants. The inventory and is almost identical to that of Laz, Georgian, and Svan. The table below shows the consonants of Mingrelian in romanized script, phonetic symbols from the IPA, and in Mkhedruli script.

Mingrelian consonants
		Labial	Alveolar	Palatal	Velar	Uvular	Glottal
Nasal		m [m] მ	n [n] ნ				
Plosive	voiced	b [b] ბ	d [d] დ		g [ɡ] გ		
Plosive	aspirated	p [pʰ] ფ	t [tʰ] თ		k [kʰ] ქ		
Plosive	ejective	p̌ [pʼ] პ	ţ [tʼ] ტ		ǩ [kʼ] კ	qʼ [qʼ] ყ	ɔ [ʔ] ჸ
Affricate	voiced		ž [d͡z] ძ	dj [d͡ʒ] ჯ			
Affricate	aspirated		ʒ [t͡sʰ] ც	ç [t͡ʃʰ] ჩ			
Affricate	ejective		ǯ [t͡sʼ] წ	č [t͡ʃʼ] ჭ			
Fricative	voiced	v [v] ვ	z [z] ზ	j [ʒ] ჟ	ɣ [ɣ] ღ		
Fricative	voiceless		s [s] ს	ş [ʃ] შ	x [x] ხ		h [h] ჰ
Trill			r [r] რ				
Approximant			l [l] ლ	y [j] ჲ			

=== Phonetic processes ===
==== Vowel reduction ====
Certain pairs of vowels reduce to single vowels:

- ae and ai → ee → e
- ao, oa and oo → aa → a
- ou → uu → u

In Zugdidi-Samurzaqano dialect the vowels i and u also often reduce to ə.

==== Pre-consonant change of velar g ====
Before consonants, g → r.

==== Positional change of uvular q' sound ====
In word-initial prevocalic and intervocalic positions, q' → ʔ. Before the consonant v, q' → ɣ/ǩ.

==== Regressive assimilation of consonants ====
The common types are:

- voicing/devoicing of voiceless/voiced consonants before voiced/voiceless ones (respectively).
- glottalization of consonants before the glottalized ones and the glottal stop.

==== Progressive dissimilation ====
If the stem contains r then the suffixes -ar and -ur transform to -al and -ul, e.g. xorga (Gaghma Pirveli Khorga, the village)→ xorg-ul-i ("Khorgan"). The rule is not valid if in the stem with r an l appears later, e.g. marṫvili ("Martvili", the town) dj marṫvil-ur-i (adj. "Martvilian")

In a stem with voiceless affricates or voiceless sibilants, a later ǯ is deaffricated to d, e.g. orcxondji dj orcxondi "comb", ç̌andji dj ç̌andi "fly (insect)", isindji dj isindi "arrow", etc.

==== The transformation of l ====
- in all dialects of Mingrelian, before consonants l → r.
- in the Martvili subdialect in word-initial prevocalic position, l → y → ∅ and in intervocalic position l → ∅

==== Intervocalic deletion of v ====
Between the vowels the organic v disappears, e.g. xvavi (Geo. "abundance, plenty") → *xvai → xvee (id.), mṭevani (Geo. "raceme") → ţiani (id.), etc.

==== Phonetic augmentation n ====
Before the stops and affricates, an inorganic augmentation n may appear (before labials n → m).

== Mingrelian orthography ==
Mingrelian is written in the Georgian Mkhedruli script. The spelling using the Mkhedruli script uses symbols not used in Georgian : ⟨ჲ ჷ ჸ⟩ to represent /j ə ʔ/, respectively. The Mkhedruli script was used in Mingrelian publications from 1866 to 1906, from 1930 to 1939, in 1966, and has been used from 1995 on.

One book in Mingrelian was printed in the Cyrillic script in 1899 using the alphabet shown below. Slightly different Cyrillic orthographies were used in several printed texts from 1887 to 1903. The 1887 version had several Cyrillic letters in unusual phonetic values: я [dz], ѣ [h].

The Latin script column shows romanizations used by linguists.

Mkhedruli	Mingrelian Latin	Mingrelian Cyrillic	IPA transcription
ა	a	а	ɑ
ბ	b	б	b
გ	g	г	ɡ
დ	d	д	d
ე	e	е	ɛ
ვ	v	в	v
ზ	z	з	z
თ	t	ꚋ	t
ი	i	і	i
კ	ǩ	к	kʼ
ლ	l	л	l
მ	m	м	m
ნ	n	н	n
ჲ	y	ј	j
ო	o	о	ɔ
პ	p̌	п	pʼ
ჟ	zh	ж	ʒ
რ	r	р	r
ს	s	с	s
ტ	ṫ	т	tʼ
უ	u	у	u
ჷ	ƨ	ѵ	ə
ფ	p	ҧ	p
ქ	k	ӄ	k
ღ	ǧ	ҕ	ɣ
ყ	q̌	k	qʼ
ჸ	ɔ	ɣ	ʔ
შ	ş / sh	ш	ʃ
ჩ	ç / ch	ч	t͡ʃ
ც	ʒ / ts	ц	t͡s
ძ	dz	ӡ	d͡z
წ	ǯ / tz	ҵ	t͡sʼ
ჭ	ç̌	ꚓ	t͡ʃʼ
ხ	x	х	x
ჯ	dj	џ	d͡ʒ
ჰ	h	һ	h

== Dialects ==
The main dialects and subdialects of Mingrelian are:

- Zugdidi-Samurzakano or Northwest dialect
  - Jvari
- Senaki-Poti or Southeast dialect
  - Martvili-Bandza
  - Abasha

== Famous speakers ==
- Lavrenti Beria, Soviet leader Joseph Stalin's chief of secret police
- Konstantine Gamsakhurdia, one of the most influential Georgian writers of the 20th century
- Zviad Gamsakhurdia, first president of post-Soviet Georgia
- Antisa Khvichava, claimed world's oldest person (purportedly 132 years old at the time of her death in 2012).
- Khvicha Kvaratskhelia, Georgian footballer
- Ilia Topuria, Spanish and Georgian mixed martial artist
