= Abasha =

Town in Samegrelo-Zemo Svaneti, Georgia

Abasha აბაშა
- Town
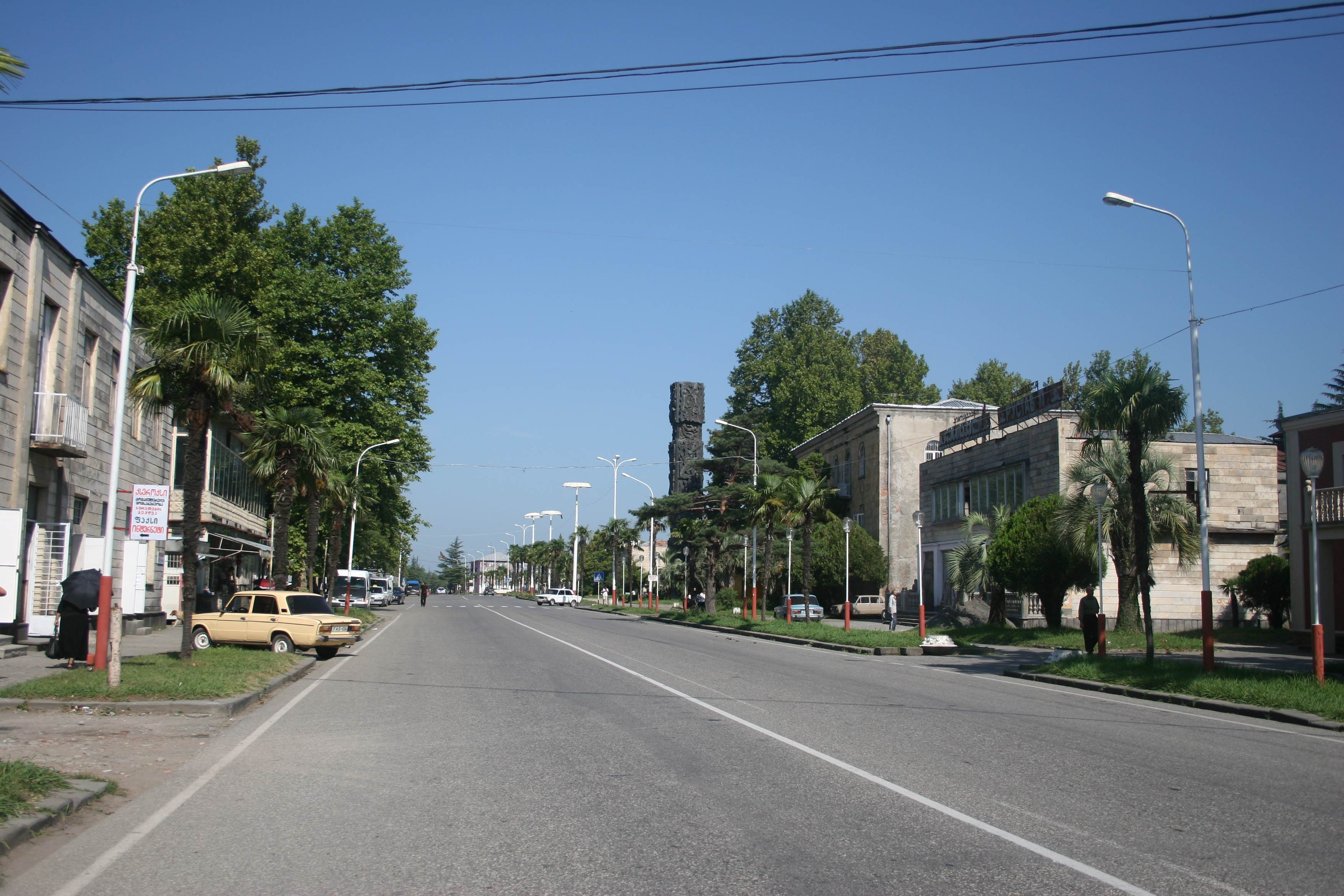
- Abasha's main street

- Flag Seal

- Location in Georgia Abasha (Samegrelo-Zemo Svaneti)
- Coordinates: 42°12′15″N 42°12′10″E
- Country: Georgia
- Region: Samegrelo-Zemo Svaneti
- District: Abasha
- Elevation: 23 m (75 ft)

Population (2024)
  - Total: 4,225
- Time zone: UTC+4 (Georgian Time)
- Website: abasha.ge

Abasha (Georgian: აბაშა) is a town in western Georgia with a population of 4,941. It is situated between the rivers of Abasha and Noghela, at 23m above sea level and is located some 283 km (176 mi) to the west of Tbilisi. The settlement of Abasha acquired the status of a town in 1964 and currently functions as an administrative center of the Abasha Municipality within the Samegrelo-Zemo Svaneti region. The headquarters of the Georgian Orthodox Eparchy of Chkondidi is also located in Abasha.

The modern history of Abasha is primarily associated with a resonant Soviet-era economic experiment introduced by the Georgian Communist party chief Eduard Shevardnadze in the 1970s. In 1971, Shevardnadze grouped all regional agricultural institutions, including the kolkhoz, into a single management association. At the same time, those who worked on the land received material and financial preference. The move facilitated local initiative and coordination and led to a rapid increase in agricultural production in the previously very poor Abasha District. It had been the first private enterprise in the Soviet Union since Lenin. Early in the 1980s, the "Abasha experiment" was expanded, with varying degrees of success, to other regions of Georgia.

== Name ==
The word "Abasha" comes from Arabic. According to a legend, the Arabs wanted to cross the river, but it was swollen and they shouted at one another "Aba-sha" i.e. "retreat". According to the memoir by Juansher, a 23,000 Abyssinian infantryman of Ethiopian origin in the Marwan II's army in the 8th century drowned in one river, and the other river seized 35,000 horses. Due to that one river was named Abasha and the other one Tskhenistsqali.

== People from Abasha ==
- Konstantine Gamsakhurdia (1893–1975), a Georgian writer
- Akaki Khoshtaria (1873–1932), a Georgian entrepreneur, socialite, and philanthropist
- Radish Tordia (born 1936), a Georgian painter
- Giorgi Kvilitaia (born 1993), a Georgian professional football player, currently active for K.A.A. Gent
- Revaz Nadareishvili Born: June 21, 1991 (age 28 years), Abasha, Georgia. a Georgian Greco-Roman wrestler. He won a bronze medal at the 2017 World Wrestling Championships. He competed in the men's Greco-Roman 98 kg event at the 2016 Summer Olympics, in which he was eliminated in the round of 16 by Elis Guri.

== See also ==
- Samegrelo-Zemo Svaneti
