= Martvili =

Martvili მარტვილი Chkondidi, Gegechkori
- Town
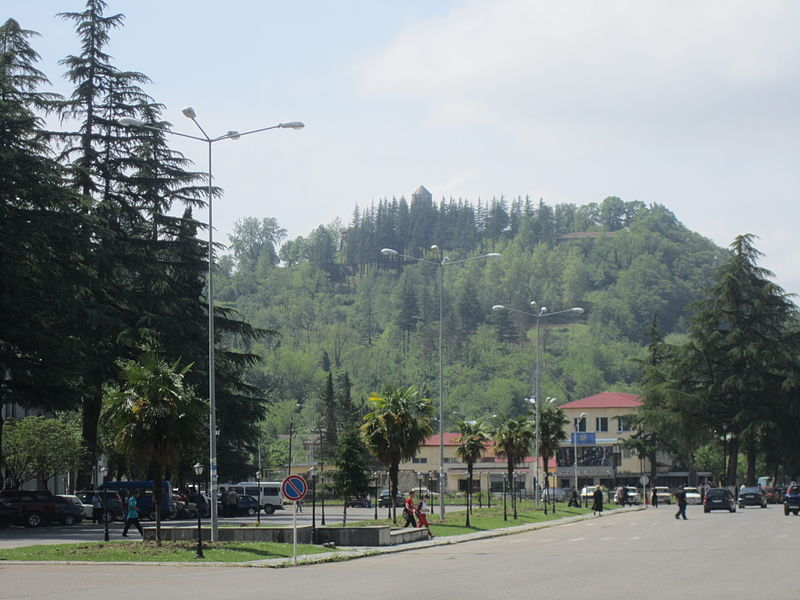
- Martvili downtown

- Location of Martvili in Georgia Martvili (Samegrelo-Zemo Svaneti)
- Coordinates: 42°24′50″N 42°22′40″E
- Country: Georgia
- Region: Samegrelo-Zemo Svaneti
- District: Martvili
- Elevation: 170 m (560 ft)

Population (2024)
  - Total: 3,980
- Time zone: UTC+4 (Georgian Time)
- Website: http://martvili.gov.ge

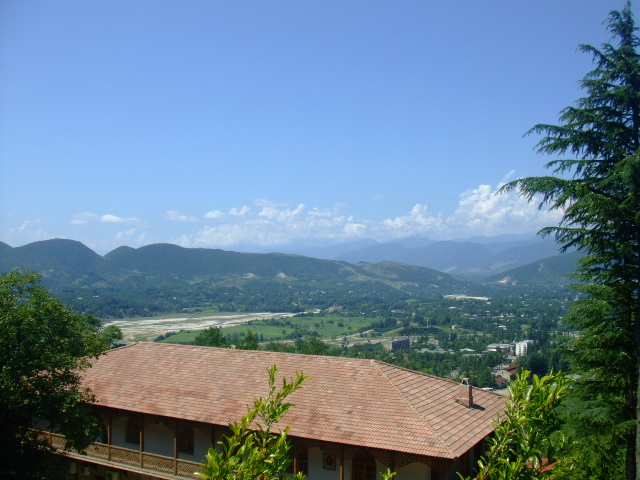
The Martvili Monastery

Martvili (Georgian: მარტვილი) is a small town in Samegrelo-Zemo Svaneti province of Western Georgia. Its monastery was Samegrelo's clerical centre in the Middle Ages. Under Soviet rule, from 1936 to 1990, it was named Gegechkori after Sasha Gegechkori, an Old Bolshevik.

== Geography ==
The town of Martvili is located in the Odishi-Guria plain between the Noghela and Abasha rivers, 33 km from the town of Abasha itself. The town rests 170 m above sea level.

== Demographics ==
As of the 2020 census, Martvili had a population of 4203 people.

Historical population
Year	Pop.	±% p.a.
1939	1,660	—
1959	5,062	+5.73%
1970	2,984	−4.69%
1979	3,156	+0.62%
1989	6,036	+6.70%
2002	5,609	−0.56%
2014	4,425	−1.96%
2020	4,203	−0.85%
Source: Population data (1939 - 1989, 2020), 2002 and 2014

== Twin towns – sister cities ==
Martvili is twinned with the following cities:

- Ardeşen, Turkey
- Jevíčko, Czech Republic
- Czarnków, Poland
- Gmina Odolanów, Poland
- Boiarka, Ukraine

== Gallery ==
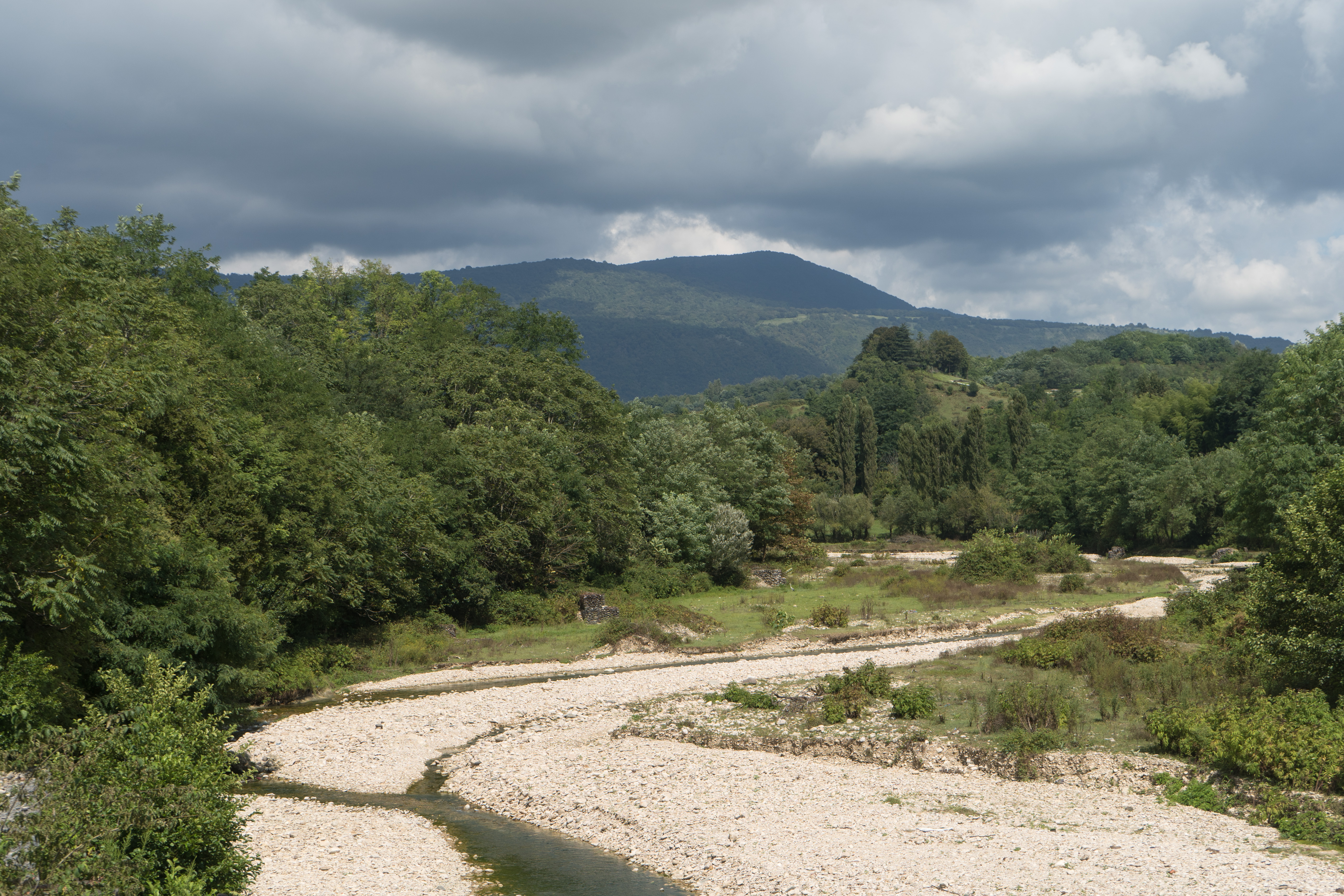
Abasha river in Martvili

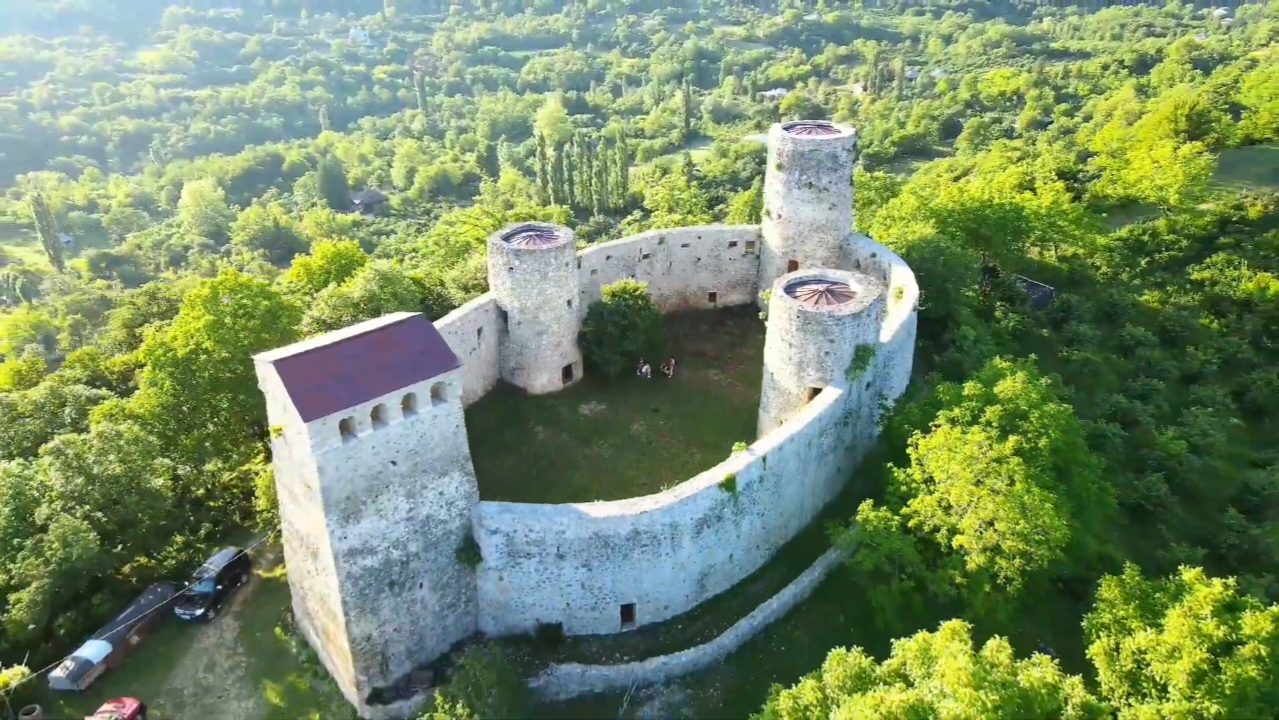
Nogha Fortress in Martvili

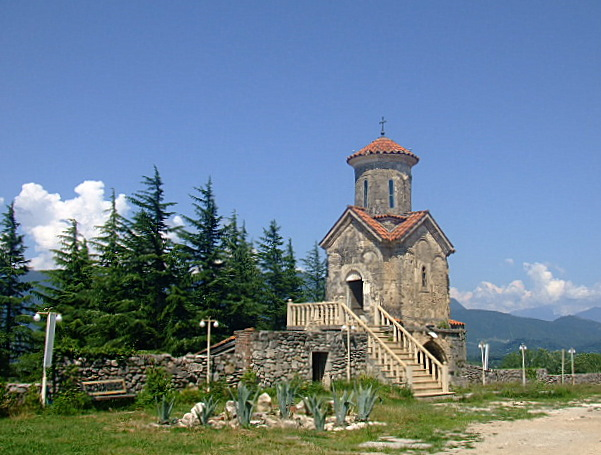
Martvili Monastery

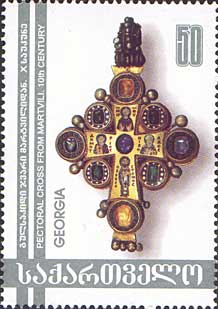
Georgian stamp featuring pectoral cross from Martvili
