= Martvili Municipality =

Coordinates: 42°25′N 42°22′E

- Municipality
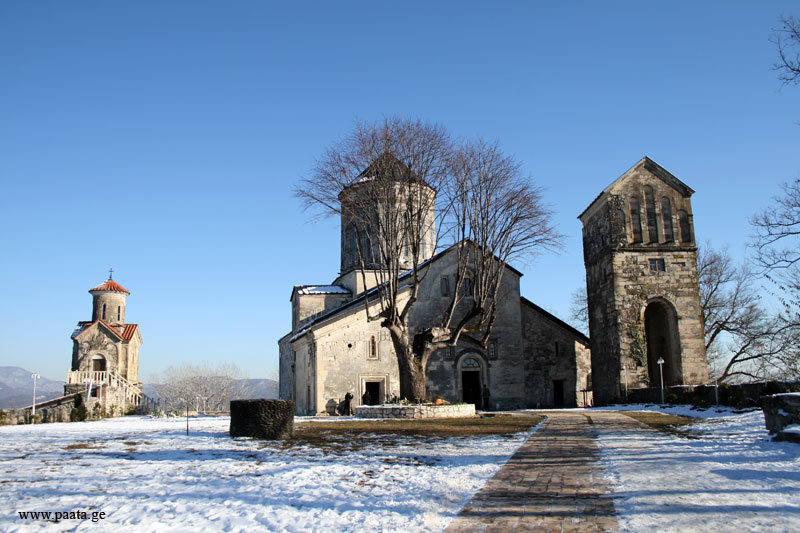
- Martvili monastery

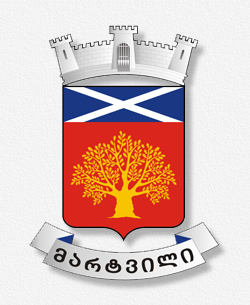
- Flag Seal

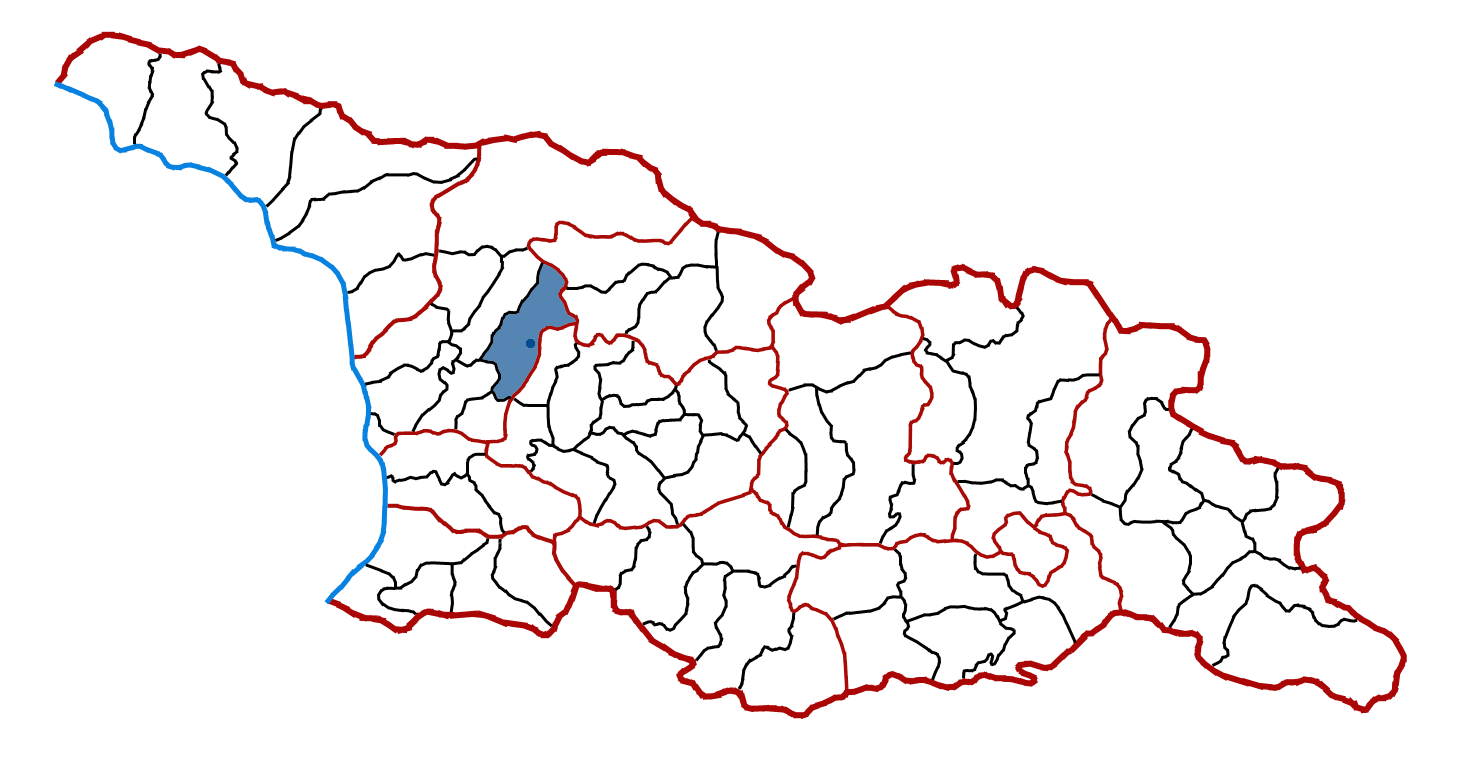
- Location of the municipality within Georgia
- Country: Georgia
- Region: Samegrelo-Zemo Svaneti
- Administrative centre: Martvili

Government
  - Body: Martvili Municipal Assembly
  - Mayor: Giorgi Nachkebia

Area
  - Total: 880.6 km^{2} (340.0 sq mi)

Population (2014)
  - Total: 33,463
  - Density: 38/km^{2} (98/sq mi)

Population by ethnicity
  - Georgians: 99,8 %
  - Russians: 0,1 %
- Time zone: UTC+4 (Georgian Standard Time)
- Website: http://www.martvili.gov.ge

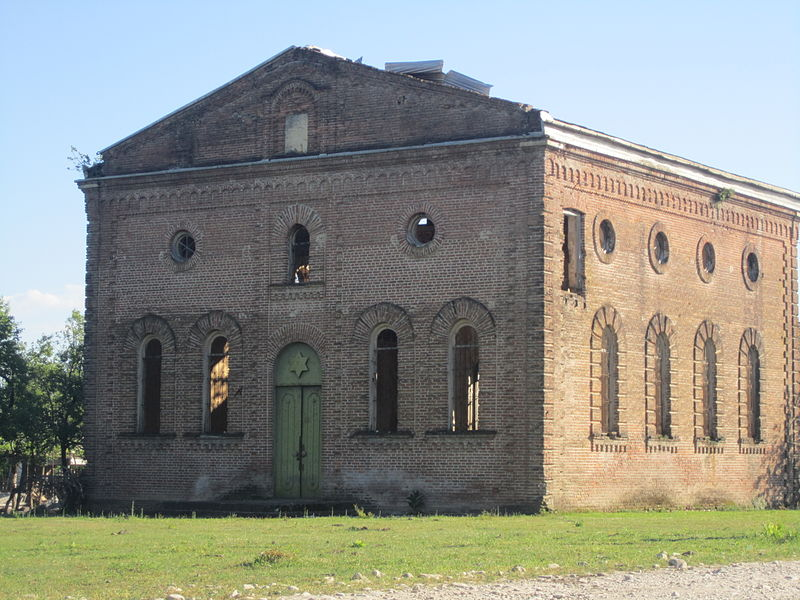
Bandza Synagogue

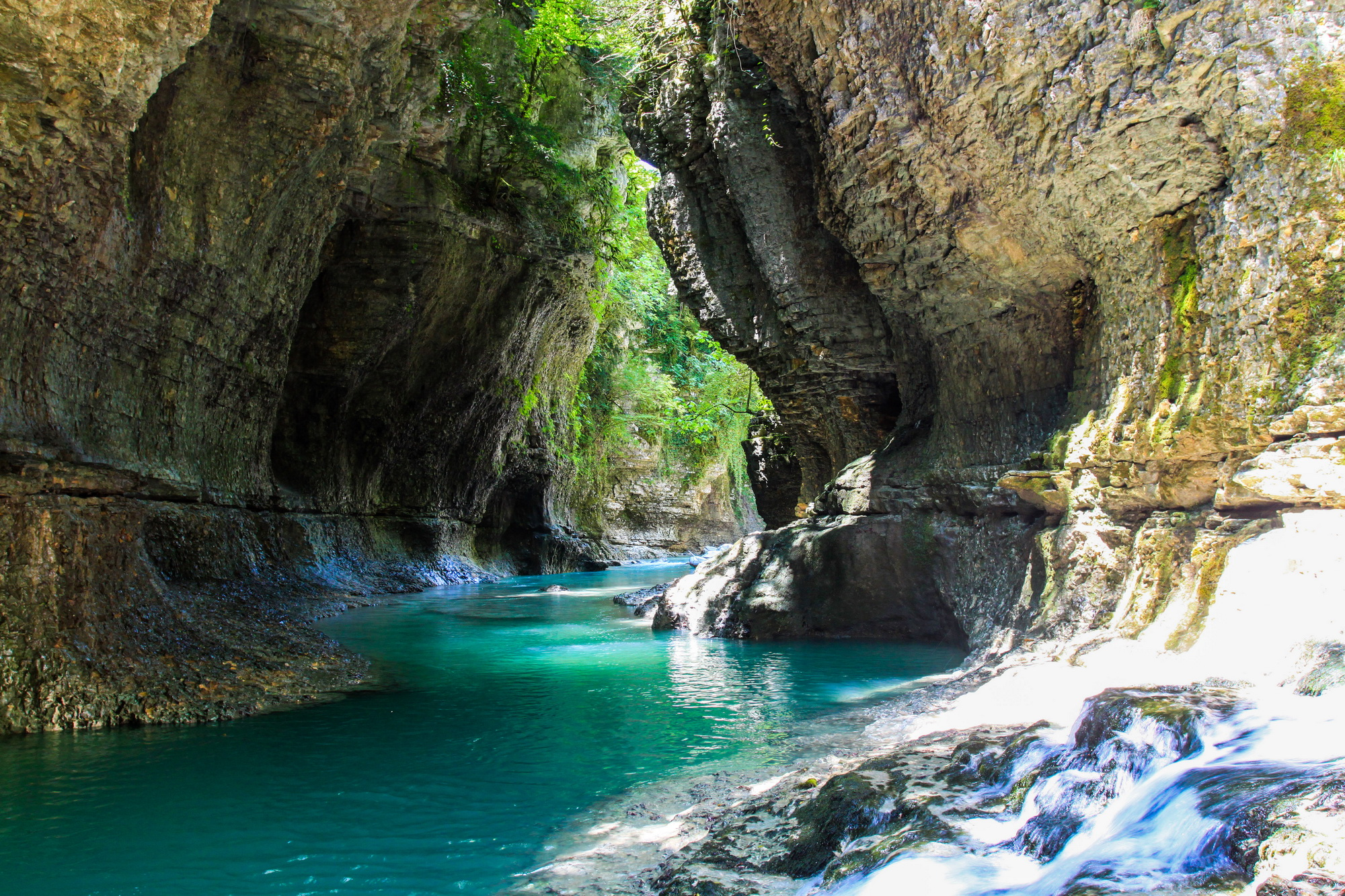
Gachedili Canyon Natural Monument

Martvili (Georgian: მარტვილის მუნიციპალიტეტი) is a district of Georgia, in the region of Samegrelo-Zemo Svaneti. Its main town is Martvili. Martvili Municipality is located in the north-eastern part of western Georgia. It is bordered by Lentekhi in the north, Khoni and Tsageri in the east, Abasha in the south, Senaki and Chkhorotsku in the west. The southern part of the Martvili area is occupied by a lowland that rises from southwest to northeast from 60 to 170 meters. The highest place, the headwaters of Tekhuri is located at 3003 meters above sea level. To the south-west of the municipality is the Askha Mountain Range, which is rich in karst caves, waterfalls, mineral deposits and limestone. The mountains of Lebarde, Chekola and Dviri are rich in healing mineral waters.

== Politics ==
Martvili Municipal Assembly (Georgian: მარტვილის საკრებულო) is a representative body in Martvili Municipality, consisting of 36 members which is elected every four years. The last election was held in October 2021. Tornike Janashia of Georgian Dream was elected mayor in a tight 2nd round against a candidate of the United National Movement

Party	2017	2021	Current Municipal Assembly
Georgian Dream	19	15	
United National Movement	10	11	
For Georgia		5	
European Socialists		4	
European Georgia	4	1	
Alliance of Patriots	3		
Freedom - Zviad Gamsakhurdia's Way	1		
Total	37	36	

== Administrative divisions ==
Mart'vili municipality is divided into one city (ქალაქი, kalaki), and 20 villages (სოფელი, sopeli):

=== Cities ===
- Martvili

=== Villages ===
- Didi Ch'q'oni
- Salkhino
- Nagvazao
- Vedidk'ari
- Abedati
- Bandza
- Gach'edili
- Tamak'oni
- Lekhaindrao
- Kurzu
- T'aleri
- Khunts'i
- Sergieti
- K'its'i
- Inchkhuri
- Nakhunao
- Gurdzemi
- Onoghia
- Najakhao
- Doshaq'e
- First Balda (ka:პირველი ბალდა)
- Second Balda (ka:მეორე ბალდა)
- Third Balda (ka:მესამე ბალდა)

== Twin towns – sister Municipalities ==
- Ardeşen, Turkey
- Boyarka, Ukraine
- Czarnków, Poland
- Jevíčko, Czech Republic
- Odolanów, Poland

== See also ==
- List of municipalities in Georgia (country)
