= Abasha Municipality =

Abasha Municipality აბაშის მუნიციპალიტეტი
- Municipality
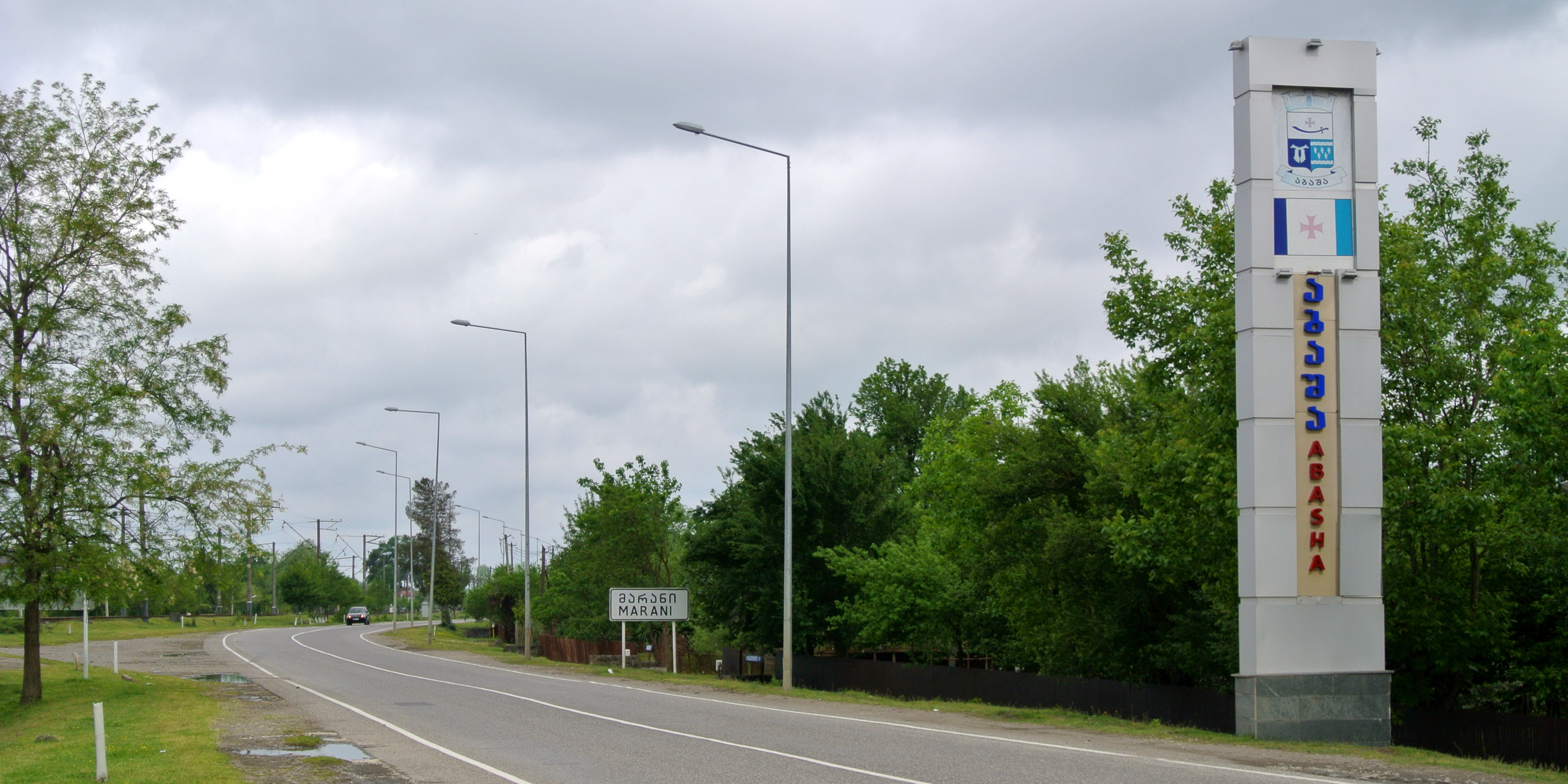
- Abasha Municipality

- Flag Coat of arms

- Location of Abasha Municipality in Georgia

- Location within Samegrelo-Zemo Svaneti Location within Georgia
- Coordinates: 42°12′N 42°13′E
- Country: Georgia
- Region: Samegrelo-Zemo Svaneti
- Capital: Abasha
- various: 1 town, and villages

Area
  - Total: 323 km^{2} (125 sq mi)

Population (2014)
  - Total: 22,341
  - Density: 69.2/km^{2} (179/sq mi)
- Time zone: UTC+4 (Georgian Time)
- Website: https://abasha.gov.ge/

Abasha (Georgian: აბაშის მუნიციპალიტეტი) is a district of Georgia, in the region of Samegrelo-Zemo Svaneti. Its main town is Abasha.

Population: 22,341 (2014 census) Area: 323 km^{2}

== Sights ==
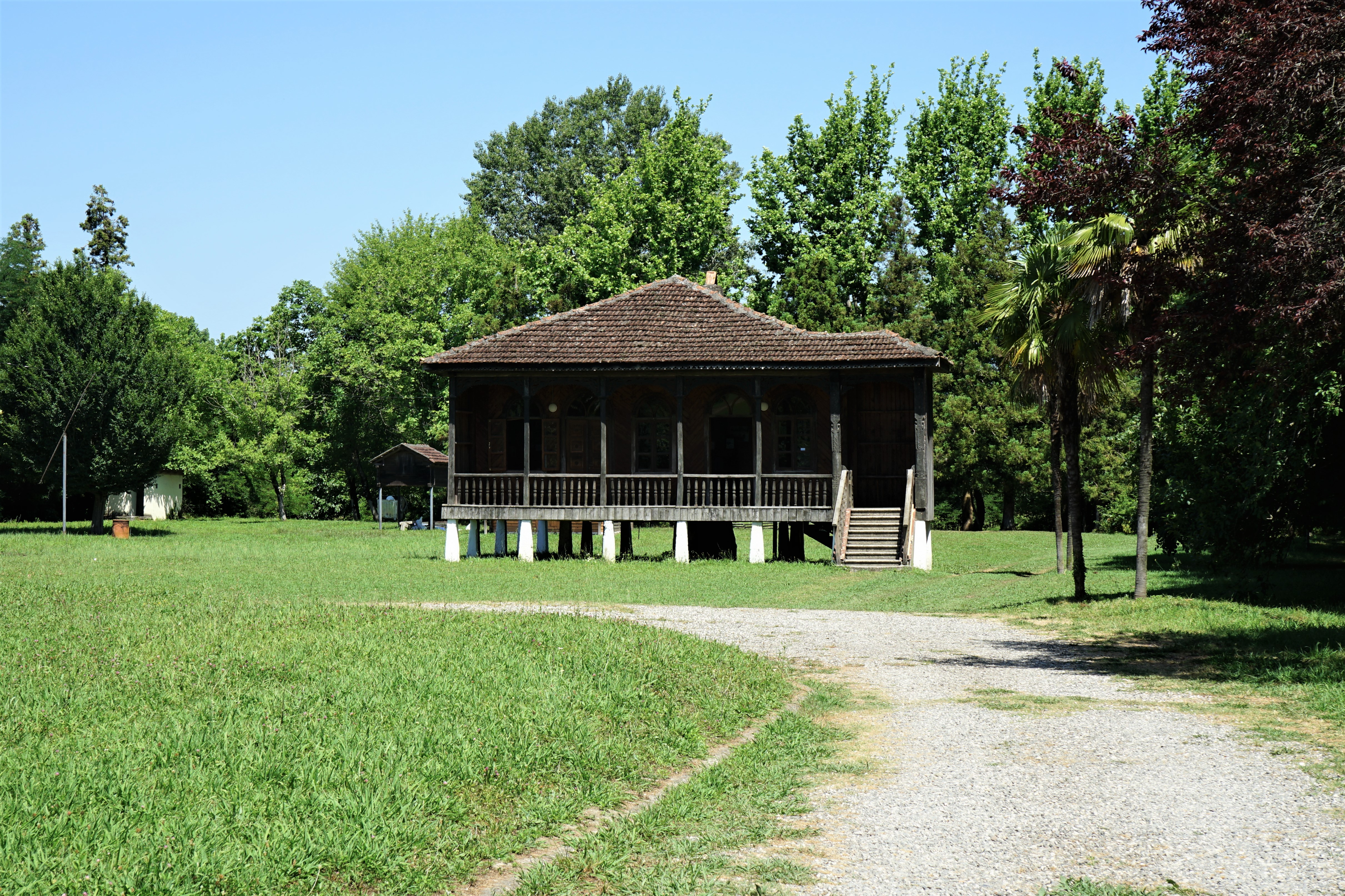
House Museum of Konstantine Gamsakhurdia in Dzveli Abasha

House Museum of famous Georgian writer, Acad. Konstantine Gamsakhurdia

== Politics ==
Abasha Municipal Assembly (Georgian: აბაშის საკრებულო) is a representative body in Abasha Municipality, consisting of 30 members which is elected every four years. The last election was held in October 2021. Giga Gabelaia of Georgian Dream was elected mayor.

| Party | 2017 | 2021 | Current Municipal Assembly |
|---|---|---|---|
| Georgian Dream | 21 | 18 | |
| United National Movement | 6 | 8 | |
| For Georgia | | 2 | |
| New Political Center - Girchi | | 1 | |
| Labour Party | | 1 | |
| European Georgia | 1 | | |
| Alliance of Patriots | 1 | | |
| Democratic Movement | 1 | | |
| State for the People | 1 | | |
| Independent | 1 | | |
| Total | 32 | 30 | |

== Administrative divisions ==
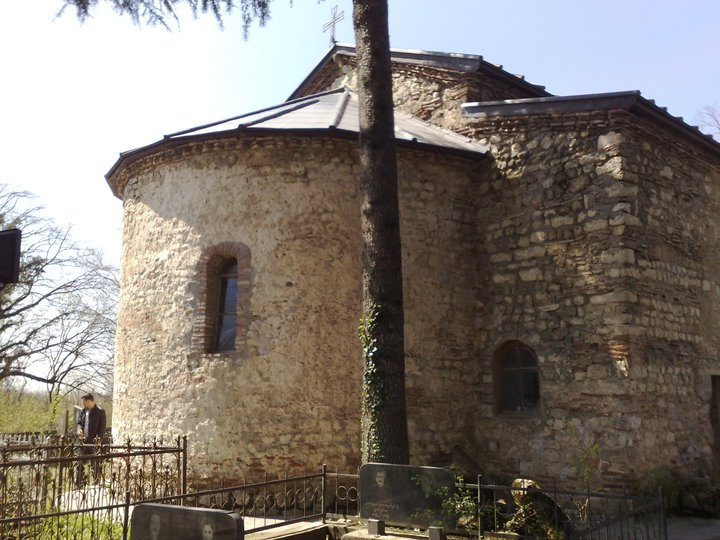
Sefieti Church

Abasha municipality is divided into one city (ქალაქი, kalaki), 15 communities (თემი, temi), and 35 villages (სოფელი, sopeli):

=== Cities ===
- Abasha (including Kvatana, Noghokhashi, and Kapana)

=== Communities ===
- Dzveli Abasha
- Gezati
- Ketilari
- Kolobani
- Marani
- Naesakovo
- Norio
- Ontopo
- Pirveli Maisi
- Samikao
- Sepieti
- Sujuna
- Tqviri
- Tsqemi
- Zanati

=== Villages ===
- Abashispiri
- Bulvani
- Dzveli Abasha
- Dziguri
- Etseri
- Gamoghma zanati
- Gamoghma kodori
- Gaghma zanati
- Gaghma kodori
- Gautsqinari
- Gezati
- Gugunaqati
- Guleikari
- Gulukheti
- Ketilari
- Kvishanchala
- Kolobani
- Maidani
- Marani
- Maranchala
- Matskhovriskari
- Naesakovo
- Norio
- Ontopo
- Pirveli Maisi
- Sabokuchavo
- Sagvazavo
- Samikao
- Sepieti
- Sujuna
- Tsalikari
- Tkhmelari
- Tqviri
- Tsqemi
- Tsilori

== See also ==
- List of municipalities in Georgia (country)
