= Samegrelo-Zemo Svaneti =

Region (mkhare) of Georgia

Coordinates: 42.5°N 41.85°E

Samegrelo-Zemo Svaneti სამარგალო-ჟიმოლენი შონე (Mingrelian) ზან-ლამ შუან (Svan) სამეგრელო-ზემო სვანეთი (Georgian)
- Mkhare (region)
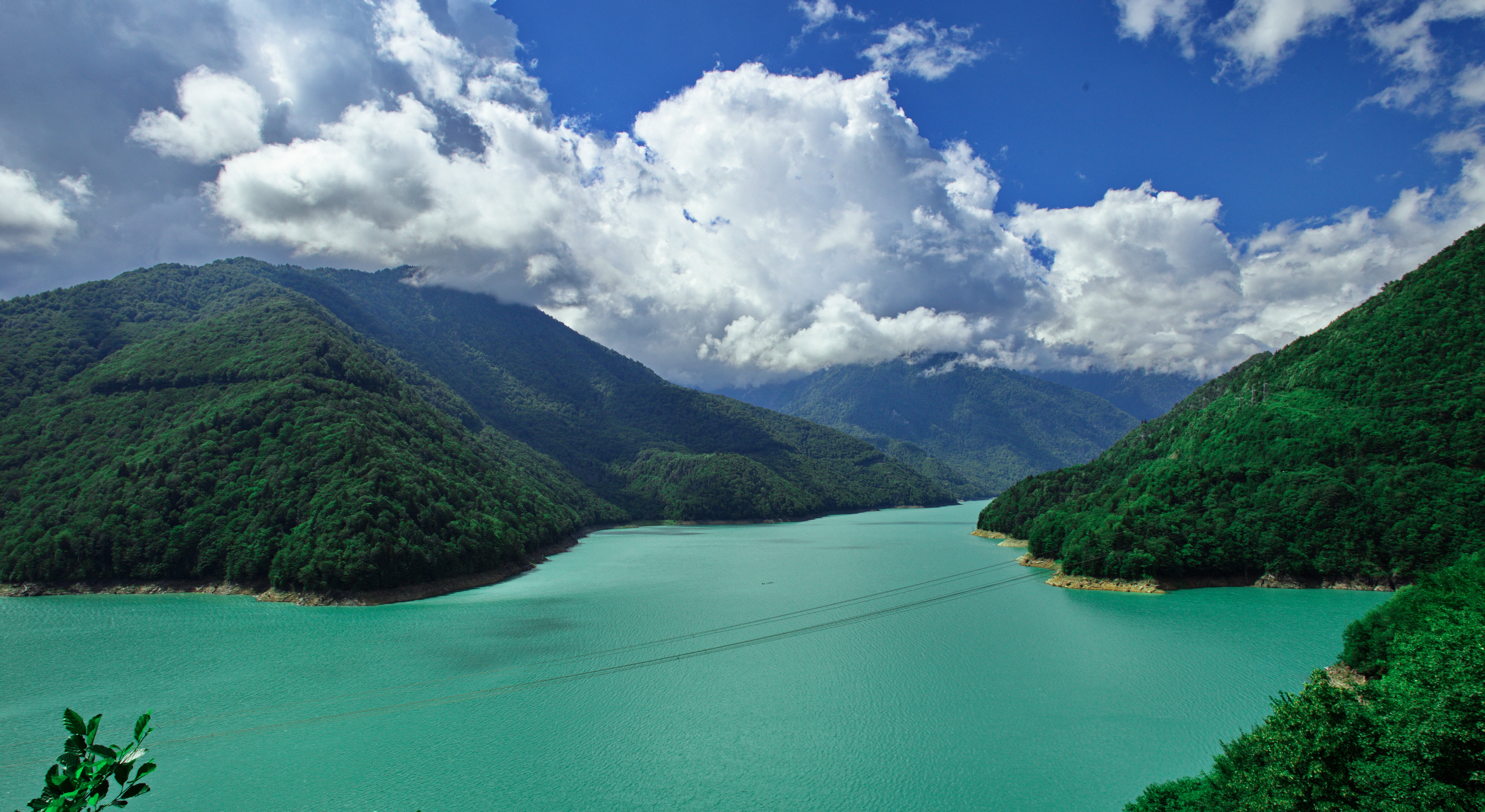
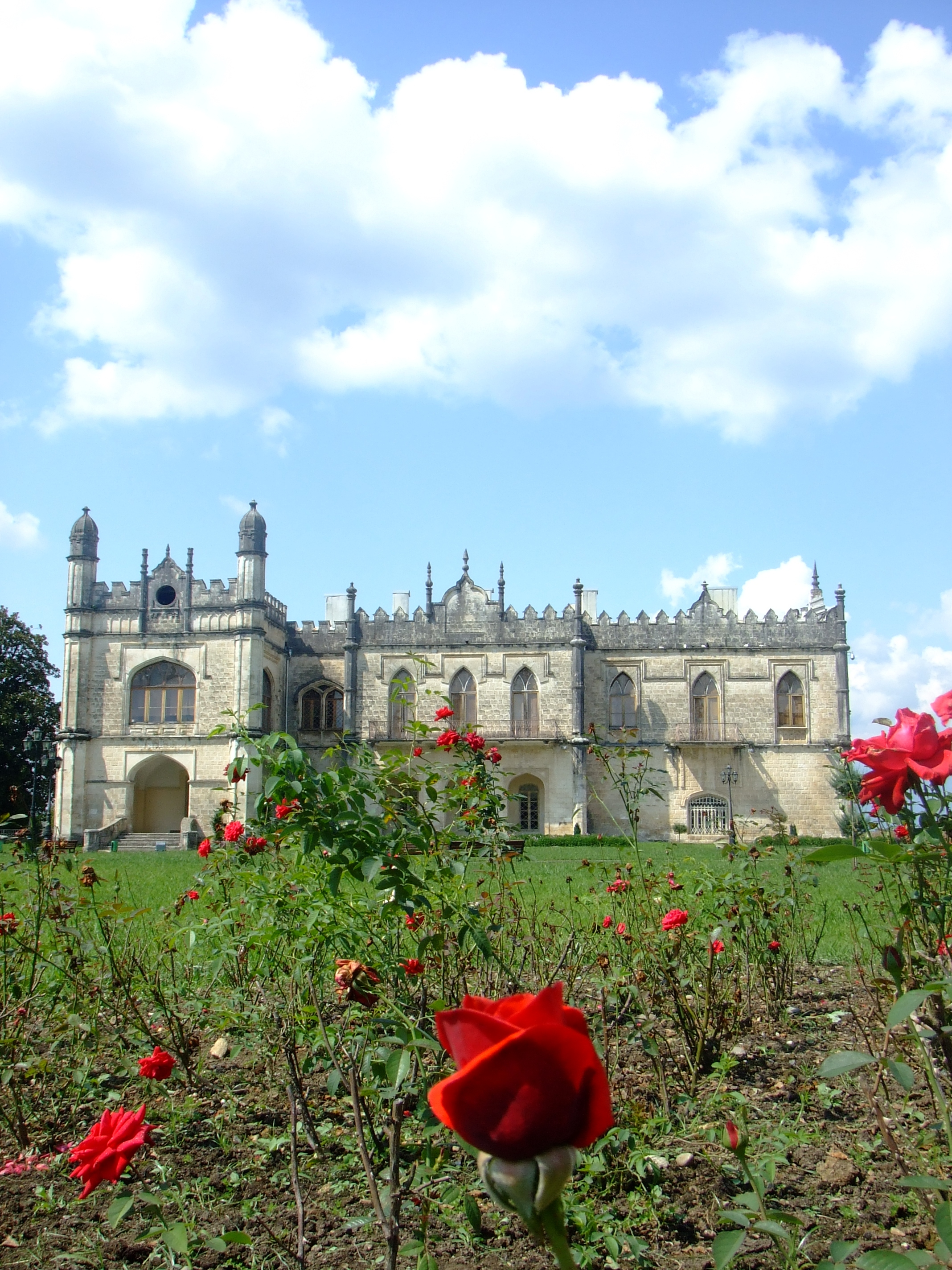
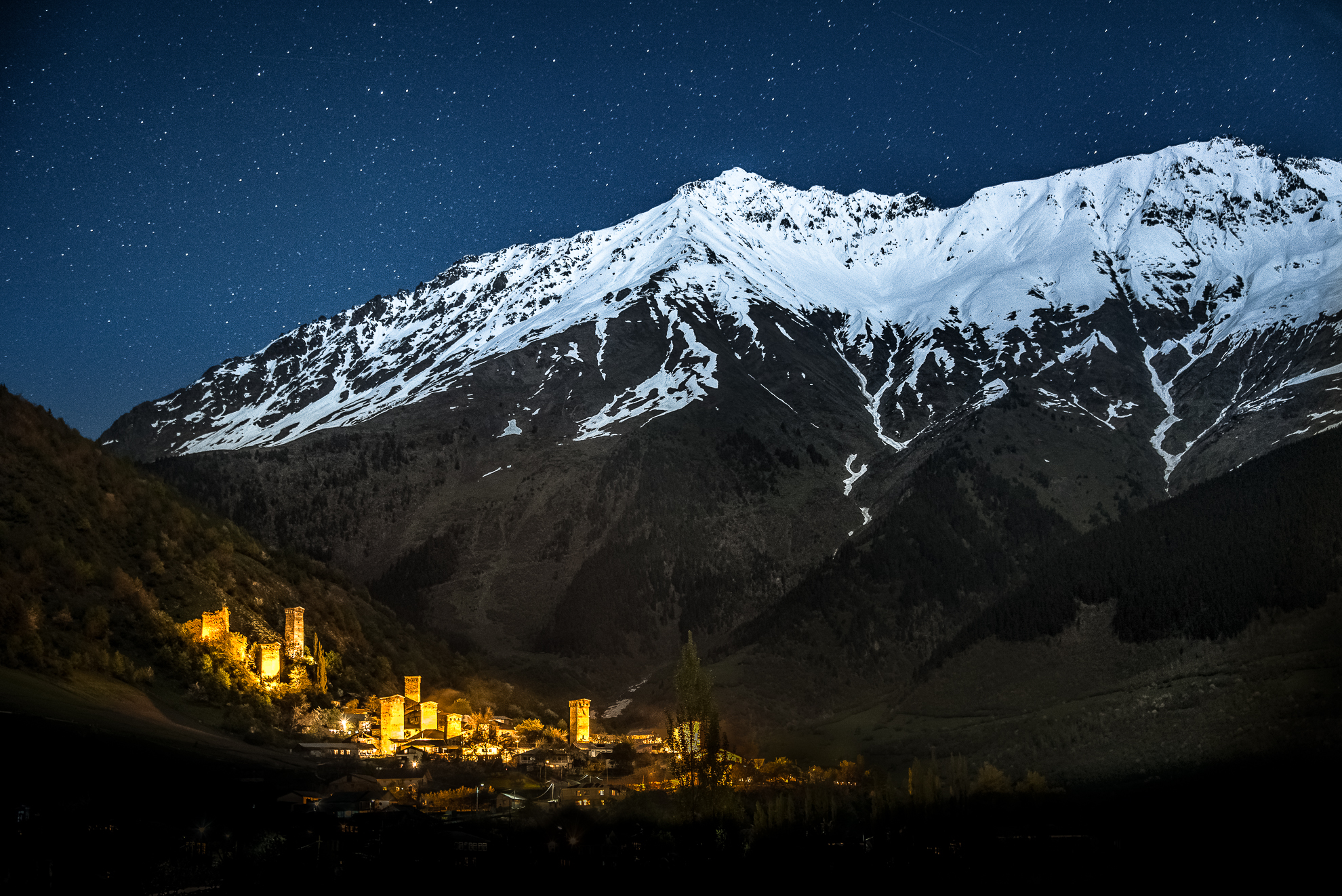
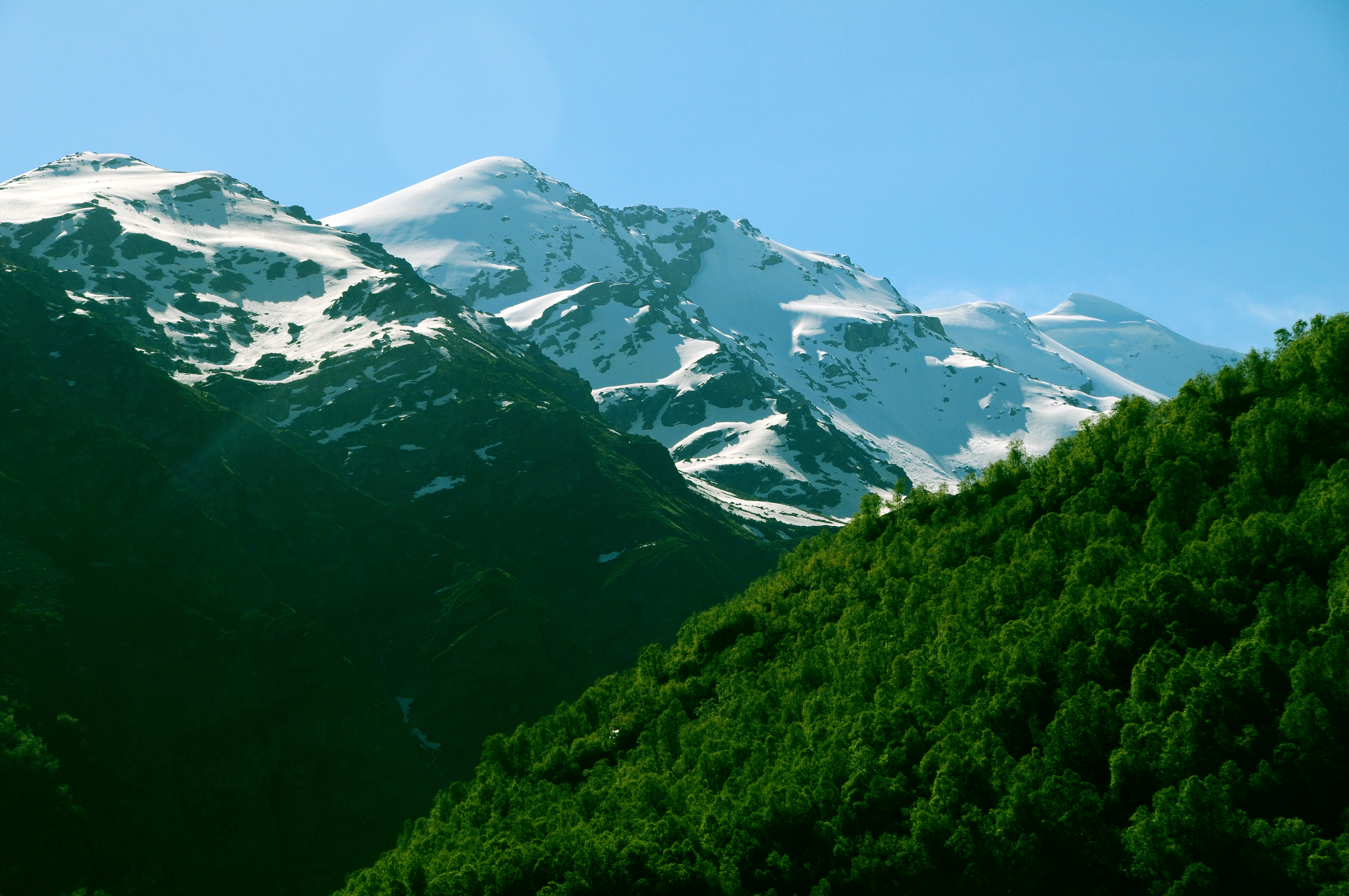
- From the top to bottom right: Enguri River, Dadiani Palace, Mestia at night, Tetnuldi, Martvili Monastery

- Country: Georgia
- Capital: Zugdidi
- Subdivisions: 1 city, 8 municipalities

Government
  - Governor: Giorgi Guguchia (2 June 2021)

Area
  - Total: 7,468 km^{2} (2,883 sq mi)

Population (2021)
  - Total: 308,358
  - Density: 41.29/km^{2} (106.9/sq mi)

Gross Regional Product
  - Total: ₾ 3.28 billion (2022)
  - Per Capita: ₾ 10,904 (2022)
- Time zone: UTC+4 (Georgian Time)
- ISO 3166 code: GE-SZ
- HDI (2023): 0.807 high · 8th

Samegrelo-Zemo Svaneti (Georgian: სამეგრელო-ზემო სვანეთი [s̪äme̞ɡɾe̞ɫo̞z̪e̞mo̞ s̪ʷän̪e̞t̪ʰi]; Megrelian: სამარგალო-ჟიმოლენი შონე [samaɾɡalo-ʒimolenɪ ʃone]; Svan: [zan-lam ʃuan]) is a region (Mkhare) in western Georgia with a population of 308,358 (2021) and a surface of 7,468 km^{2} (2,883 sq mi). Zugdidi is the region’s administrative center, and Giorgi Guguchia has been the governor of the region since June 2021. Samegrelo-Zemo Svaneti is compiled of the historical Georgian provinces of Samegrelo (Mingrelia) and Zemo Svaneti (i.e., Upper Svaneti).

== Subdivisions ==
The region has one self governing city (Poti) and 8 municipalities with 143 administrative communities (temi), totalling to 531 populated settlements:

- Eight cities: Abasha, Khobi, Martvili, Poti, Jvari, Zugdidi, Senaki and Tsalenjikha.
- Two dabas: Mestia, Chkhorotsku
- Villages: 521

Map	Municipality
City of Poti
Abasha Municipality
Zugdidi Municipality
Martvili Municipality
Mestia Municipality
Senaki Municipality
Chkhorotsku Municipality
Tsalenjikha Municipality
Khobi Municipality

== Geography ==
The Samegrelo-Zemo Svaneti Mkhare can be split into two historical regions; Svaneti and Samegrelo. In the northern part of Samegrelo lies the Egrisi Mountains. The municipalities of Chkhorotsqu, Martvili, and Tsalenjikha are located right next to the Egrisi mountain range in Northern Samegrelo. In the south lies the Kolkheti valley, which is a mostly flat region. The municipalities that lie in the valley are Zugdidi, Khobi, Senaki, Abasha, and the city of Poti. The west side of Samegrelo borders Apkhazeti right on the Enguri River and the east borders Imereti on the Tskhenistsqali River. The important Rioni River of West Georgia also passes through Samegrelo, flowing into the black sea in the city of Poti. The other region; Zemo Svaneti, is located right next to the Northern Caucasus Mountain Range. Its only municipality is Mestia. Svaneti has the tallest mountain in Georgia, Mt. Shkhara, at 5,193 meters, or 17,037 feet.

== Demographic ==
Population development of the region Samegrelo-Zemo Svaneti
	1959	1970	1979	1989	2002*	2002**	2014	2021
Abasha Municipality	30,286	▲30,416	▼29,246	▼28,219	▲28,707	-	▼22,341	▼19,560
Khobi Municipality	31,280	▲37,653	▲38,092	▲38,939	▲41,240	-	▼30,548	▼27,806
Martvili Municipality	47,777	▲49,167	▼47,797	▼46,009	▼44,627	-	▼33,463	▼31,495
Mestia Municipality	16,311	▲17,801	▼17,442	▼14,776	▼14,248	-	▼9,316	▲9,447
City of Poti	48,117	▼45,979	▲48,508	▲50,922	▼47,149	-	▼41,465	▲41,536
Senaki Municipality	47,553	▲50,336	▲50,774	▲52,681	▼52,112	-	▼39,652	▼34,315
Tsalenjikha Municipality	29,019	▲37,813	▲39,477	▼38,643	▲40,133	-	▼26,158	▼23,296
Chkhorotsku Municipality	27,647	▲30,784	▲31,404	▼29,840	▲30,124	-	▼22,309	▼21,361
Zugdidi Municipality	96,643	▲112,241	▲120,217	▲125,444	▲167,760	-	▼105,509	▼99,542
Samegrelo-Zemo Svaneti	374,633	▲412,190	▲422,957	▲425,473	466,100	▼416,349	▼330,761	▼308,358
* Research after 2014 census showed the 2002 census was inflated by 8-9 percent. **Corrected data based on retro-projection 1994–2014 in collaboration with UN

=== Ethnic groups ===
According to the Georgian census of 2014, 99.37% of the population is Georgian.

=== Languages ===
Georgian is spoken by the entire population of the region and by the ethnic minorities like Russians and others. Mingrelian is a Kartvelian language spoken by the Mingrelians, a sub-group of Georgian people and native to Mingrelia.

Svan is also a Kartvelian language, spoken by the Svans, a sub-group of Georgian people native to Svaneti.

=== Religion ===
About 99% of the population identifies as Orthodox Christian.

== See also ==
- Administrative divisions of Georgia (country)
