= National Science Library =

National Science Library may refer to:

- Canada Institute for Scientific and Technical Information (CISTI), Ottawa, Canada
- Institut de l'information scientifique et technique, Vandœuvre-lès-Nancy, France
- German National Library of Science and Technology, Hanover, Germany
- National Science Library & Resource Centre
- National Science Library (Georgia)
- National Science Digital Library, United States
- National Science Library (India)
- National Science Library (Bangladesh)

== See also ==
- List of libraries
- National library
