= Otar Patsatsia =

Georgian politician (1929–2021)

- ოთარ ფაცაცია

3rd Prime Minister of Georgia
- In office 20 August 1993 – 5 October 1995
- President: Eduard Shevardnadze
- Preceded by: Eduard Shevardnadze (acting)
- Succeeded by: Bakur Gulua (acting); Position abolished; Niko Lekishvili as the State Minister of Georgia

Personal details
- Born: 15 May 1929 Ingiri, Zugdidi Municipality, Georgian SSR, Soviet Union
- Died: 9 December 2021 (aged 92) Tbilisi, Georgia

Otar Patsatsia (Georgian: ოთარ ფაცაცია; 15 May 1929 – 9 December 2021) was a Georgian politician who served as the country's Prime Minister from 20 August 1993 to 5 October 1995.

A former Communist bureaucrat and enterprise manager, Patsatsia led the Georgian cabinet, with Eduard Shevardnadze as Georgia's Head of State, during the years of civil strife and economic crisis. His appointment as Prime Minister was an attempt to placate the supporters of President Zviad Gamsakhurdia, militarily ousted in 1992, as Patsatsia was from Zugdidi, the powerbase of Gamsakhurdia loyalists. After then holding a seat in the Parliament of Georgia from 1995 to 1999, he played no further role in politics.

== Early life and career ==
Patsatsia was born on 15 May 1929, to Ambako Patsatsia and Luba Patsatsia, in the village of Ingiri. Trained at the Leningrad Institute of Technology as an engineer, he became a Communist party functionary in Zugdidi, serving as the First Secretary of the local Communist Party Committee from 1955 until being sacked in 1965. In 1966, he became a Director of the Zugdidi Paper Factory, a large enterprise, which he led for nearly 25 years until 1990. In the last years of the Soviet Union, he was elected a Soviet People's Deputy from 1989 to 1990 and awarded the title of Hero of Socialist Labour.

== Political career in independent Georgia ==
In 1992, Eduard Shevardnadze – a veteran Soviet politician who became Georgia's Head of State shortly after the violent overthrow of President Zviad Gamsakhurdia – appointed Patsatsia as the head of Zugdidi Municipality administration. Zugdidi was the principal powerbase of the Gamsakhurdia loyalists – the "Zviadists" – who continued their resistance, frequently with arms in hands, to the new regime and its undisciplined paramilitary groups. Shevardnadze's promotion of Patsatsia, a Zugdidi native with extensive ties with the local community, was an attempt to appease Gamsakhurdia's supporters.

After the collapse of the government of Tengiz Sigua on August 5, 1993, Shevardnadze nominated Patsatsia as a new prime minister. He won approval in the parliament on August 20, 1993. He retained his post in the September 7, 1993, reshuffle of the cabinet. The two years of Patsatsia's tenure were marked by an increasingly chaotic political environment, violent power struggles, amilitary setback in the secessionist war in Abkhazia, a full-scale civil war with the pro-Gamsakhurdia forces, and severe economic crisis, followed by controversial economic and military agreements with Russia. He was no reformer and had a conservative view of economic development, for example, privatization. Patsatsia resigned on October 5, 1995, to stand for the parliamentary election, in which he ran as a non-party candidate from Zugdidi and won a majoritarian seat for the next four years.

== Death ==
Patsatsia died from COVID-19 on 9 December 2021, at the age of 92 during the COVID-19 pandemic in Georgia.

Political offices
Preceded by Tengiz Sigua	Prime Minister of Georgia; 1993–1995	Succeeded by Position abolished
