= Zviad Gamsakhurdia =

First President of Georgia (1991–92)

- ზვიად გამსახურდია
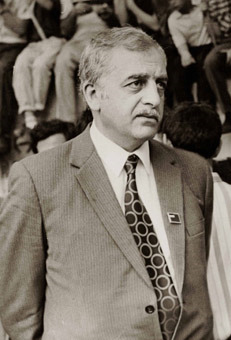
- Gamsakhurdia in 1989

1st President of Georgia
- In office 26 May 1991 – 6 January 1992
- Prime Minister: Murman Omanidze (Acting); Besarion Gugushvili
- Preceded by: Office established
- Succeeded by: Jaba Ioseliani; Tengiz Kitovani (as Chairman Of The Military Council of Georgia) Eduard Shevardnadze (1995)

Chairman of the Supreme Council of Georgia
- In office 14 November 1990 – 26 May 1991
- Preceded by: Irakli Abashidze
- Succeeded by: Himself as the Head of state; Akaki Asatiani as the Chairman of the Parliament of Georgia

Personal details
- Born: 31 March 1939 Tbilisi, Georgian SSR, Soviet Union
- Died: 31 December 1993 (aged 54) Dzveli Khibula, Georgia
- Cause of death: Gunshot wound (disputed cause)
- Resting place: Mtatsminda Pantheon
- Party: Round Table—Free Georgia: Georgian Helsinki Union; Society of St. Ilya the Righteous
- Spouses: Dali Lolua (divorced); Manana Archvadze-Gamsakhurdia (before 1993)
- Parent: Konstantine Gamsakhurdia (father)

Zviad Konstantines dze Gamsakhurdia (Note: Particularly in Soviet-era sources, his patronymic is sometimes given as Konstantinovich in the Russian style.) (Georgian: ზვიად კონსტანტინეს ძე გამსახურდია; Russian: Звиа́д Константи́нович Гамсаху́рдия, romanized: Zviad Konstantinovich Gamsakhurdiya; 31 March 1939 – 31 December 1993) was a Georgian politician, human rights activist, dissident, professor of English language studies and American literature at Tbilisi State University, and writer who became the first democratically elected President of Georgia in May 1991. He was posthumously awarded the title and Order of National Hero of Georgia in 2013.

A prominent exponent of Georgian nationalism and pan-Caucasianism, Zviad Gamsakhurdia was involved in the Soviet dissident movement from a young age. His activities attracted the attention of the Soviet authorities, and he was arrested and imprisoned numerous times. Gamsakhurdia co-founded the Georgian Helsinki Group, which sought to draw attention to human rights violations in the Soviet Union.

He organized numerous pro-independence protests in Georgia, one of which was suppressed by the Soviet Army in 1989, with Gamsakhurdia being briefly arrested. Eventually, a number of underground political organizations united around Gamsakhurdia to form the Round Table—Free Georgia coalition, which successfully challenged the ruling Communist Party of Georgia in the 1990 elections. Gamsakhurdia was elected president of Georgia in 1991, winning 87% of the vote in the presidential election. Despite his popular support, Gamsakhurdia faced significant opposition from the urban intelligentsia and former Soviet nomenklatura, as well as from within his own ranks. In early 1992, Gamsakhurdia was overthrown by warlords Tengiz Kitovani and Jaba Ioseliani, one of whom had previously been allied with him. Gamsakhurdia was forced to flee to Chechnya, where he was welcomed by Chechen president Dzhokhar Dudayev. His supporters continued to fight the post-coup government of Eduard Shevardnadze. In September 1993, Gamsakhurdia returned to Georgia and attempted to regain power. Despite initial success, the rebellion was eventually crushed by government forces with the assistance of the Russian military. Gamsakhurdia was forced into hiding in Samegrelo, a Zviadist stronghold. He was found dead in early 1994 under controversial circumstances. His death remains uninvestigated to this day.

After the civil war ended, the government continued to suppress Gamsakhurdia's supporters, often using brutal tactics. Following the overthrow of Eduard Shevardnadze during the 2003 Rose Revolution, Gamsakhurdia was rehabilitated by President Mikheil Saakashvili.

== Early life and education ==
Zviad Konstantinovich Gamsakhurdia was born in the Georgian capital Tbilisi on 31 March 1939; his father, Konstantine Gamsakhurdia, was a prominent Georgian writer during the 20th century. Konstantine held nationalist views and was imprisoned in the 1920s, but evaded the Stalinist purges and became influential as a historical novelist. He and his circle of fellow writers promoted Georgian culture and ethnic particularism within the Soviet Union. Zviad was raised in an intellectual environment that encouraged an interest in traditional Georgian history, culture and national identity.

At the age of 16, Gamsakhurdia established an underground nationalist youth group called Gorgasliani. In 1956, he participated in the demonstrations in Tbilisi alongside fellow students, including his future ally Merab Kostava. In December, he and a group of friends began distributing anti-communist Georgian nationalist pamphlets, but they were caught and brought to court. In 1958, he was arrested again for distributing anti-communist literature and was confined to a mental hospital in Tbilisi for six months, although his family background protected him from further sanctions. While in the mental hospital, Gamsakhurdia was diagnosed with "psychopathy with decompensation", making him an early victim of the political abuse of psychiatry in the Soviet Union.

After his release, Gamsakhurdia continued studying Western languages and literature at Tbilisi State University, eventually graduating with a degree in philology. In 1963, he became a lecturer in English language and American literature at the university. He also found employment at the Institute of Literature of the Georgian Academy of Sciences and joined the Georgian Writers' Union in 1966. As an academic, Gamsakhurdia focused on promoting Georgian culture, criticizing the falsification of history and supporting the Georgian Orthodox Church.

== Human rights activism ==
In the 1970s, Gamsakhurdia and his dissident intellectual circle began establishing contacts with Russian dissidents and the Western press. In mid-1974, he co-founded a human rights defence group with Kostava and others. In 1977, they established the Georgian branch of the Helsinki Rights Watch Group. It worked with the Moscow Helsinki Group and other Helsinki groups throughout the Soviet Union, which had been established to monitor the country's implementation of the 1975 Helsinki Agreement. Co-signed by Leonid Brezhnev, the agreement called for the protection of human rights, including freedom of thought, freedom of conscience, freedom of religion and national self-determination. Gamsakhurdia was also active in the underground network of samizdat publishers, contributing to a wide variety of underground political periodicals. In their publications, Gamsakhurdia and Kostava denounced corruption, the treatment of cultural heritage, the prison system, the deportation of Meskhetian Muslims, and other controversies. Although he was frequently harassed and occasionally arrested for his dissident activities, Gamsakhurdia avoided serious punishment for a long time, probably because of his family's prestige and political connections.

Despite being an insider in the Georgian Writers' Union, Gamsakhurdia was expelled from the union on 1 April 1977 after it received information from the prosecutor's office about his illegal dissident activities. Later that month, Gamsakhurdia was arrested alongside Kostava; they were accused of anti-Soviet activities, including the illegal distribution of books and periodicals. (Note: The illegal works they distributed included The Gulag Archipelago by Aleksandr Solzhenitsyn, and periodicals such as Okros Satsmisi (The Golden Fleece) and Sakartvelos Moambe (The Georgian Herald).) They spent a year imprisoned before both being convicted and sentenced to three years in prison and two in exile. Following their imprisonment, the Georgian Helsinki Group ceased to exist. In 1978, Gamsakhurdia was nominated for the Nobel Peace Prize. In 1979, he was released after publicly denouncing his dissident activities. His supporters, family, and Merab Kostava claimed that his recantation had been coerced by the KGB. Unlike Gamsakhurdia, Kostava did not recant and remained in prison until 1987, (Note: Although Kostava was supposed to be released from prison in 1982, he was sentenced to additional three years in camp and two years in exile in controversial circumstances for allegedly "insulting an officer of the law".) and Gamsakhurdia's reputation suffered. Following his release, Gamsakhurdia returned to his literary work and organizational activities. He also continued his dissident activities, contributing to samizdat periodicals and campaigning for Kostava's release. Gamsakhurdia was arrested again in October 1981 after attending a human rights demonstration in Mtskheta. He was placed under house arrest from 1982–1983 for campaigning on Kostava's behalf.

== Pro-independence movement ==
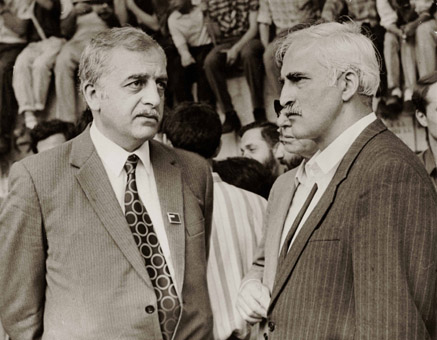
Leaders of the Georgian independence movement in the late 1980s, Zviad Gamsakhurdia (left) and Merab Kostava (right)

As Soviet leader Mikhail Gorbachev launched his glasnost reforms, which allowed greater freedom of assembly, freedom of speech, and freedom of the press, grassroots political activism increased and eventually became commonplace in Georgia and other Soviet republics. In the spring of 1985, the Georgian Helsinki Group was revived, and in 1987, as Merab Kostava and other dissidents were released from prison, the dissident movement, which had been gaining momentum, was strengthened by new leadership. Gamsakhurdia was attacked in the press as the authorities attempted to undermine the nationalist movement. In the context of glasnost, nationalist discourse among the intelligentsia heightened but remained sharply divided over the issue of independence.

In 1988, Gamsakhurdia became one of the founders of the Society of Saint Ilia the Righteous (SSIR), a religious-political organization that became the basis for his own political movement. Through the SSIR and the Helsinki Group, which was transformed into the Georgian Helsinki Union party in September 1989, Gamsakhurdia took part in organizing almost all mass protests demanding independence in the late 1980s. On 9 April 1989, the brutal suppression of a large peaceful demonstration in Tbilisi by Soviet forces proved to be a pivotal event in discrediting continued Soviet rule over the country.

The central Soviet government responded with significant changes to Georgia's leadership, replacing Jumber Patiashvili and Zurab Chkheidze. The new leadership adopted a more conciliatory approach towards the opposition. Opposition leaders arrested during the April 9 tragedy, including Zviad Gamsakhurdia, were released from prison and given a greater role in decision-making. In recognition of his considerable popularity, Gamsakhurdia was brought into negotiations with the new Soviet Georgian leader, Givi Gumbaridze, over pending legislation in the Georgian Supreme Soviet. The Supreme Soviet passed a number of measures demanded by the opposition, paving the way for independence. Gamsakhurdia's organizations soon gained support in almost all Georgian institutions, and Gamsakhurdia played a prominent role in their decisions to sever ties with the Kremlin. In February 1990, the Georgian sports association announced that it was withdrawing from Soviet championships and would hold its own competitions, with the aim of sending a Georgian team to international competitions. The ceremonies inaugurating the independent Georgian games began with opening remarks by Gamsakhurdia. The Georgian trade union organization withdrew from the all-Union trade union organization, while the republican Komsomol declared its independence from the Communist Party and the all-Union Komsomol before later dissolving itself and being replaced by new youth groups. Through political strikes, mass demonstrations, hunger strikes, and vigils, the opposition led by Gamsakhurdia forced the Soviet leadership to make concessions on numerous issues.

== Head of Georgia ==
=== Rise to power ===
The progress of democratic reforms accelerated, leading to Soviet Georgia's first democratic multiparty elections, held on 28 October 1990. On 11–13 March 1990, pro-independence opposition parties in Soviet Georgia met at the Tbilisi Philharmonic Hotel to establish a coordinating council. During the meetings, a split emerged within the pro-independence opposition, with two factions advocating different paths towards independence. Gamsakhurdia and his followers argued that the opposition should first come to power by winning official elections to the Supreme Soviet and then declare independence peacefully through existing legal procedures. The second faction, led by Giorgi Chanturia's National Democratic Party and Irakli Tsereteli's National Independence Party, argued that Georgia needed to "win freedom before achieving independence". They advocated electing an alternative representative body and boycotting the official elections, arguing that participation would only serve to "legitimize the colonial status of Georgia within the Soviet system". In April, Gamsakhurdia's Helsinki Union left the forum and, together with the Monarchist Party, the Saint Ilya the Just Society, the Merab Kostava Society, and other opposition groups, established the "Round Table—Free Georgia" ("Mrgvali Magida — Tavisupali Sakartvelo") coalition. Led by Gamsakhurdia, the coalition advocated a peaceful transition, citing the example of the Baltic republics. Meanwhile, the second faction organized its own alternative elections for the "National Congress", which it envisioned as a transitional legislative body of the national liberation movement tasked with achieving independence. However, the absence of Round Table and the subsequent withdrawal of the People's Front party undermined its claim to represent "the will of the Georgian people" through an alternative legislative body.

Gamsakhurdia's Round Table coalition ran on an ardently pro-independence platform in the October election. Gamsakhurdia campaigned tirelessly, often travelling to distant parts of Georgia in a single day and holding large rallies at sports arenas. The Round Table coalition secured a convincing victory, winning 64% of the vote, compared with the Georgian Communist Party's 29.6%. Gamsakhurdia himself won his race in a Tbilisi district with over 70 percent of the vote. On 14 November 1990, Zviad Gamsakhurdia was elected by an overwhelming majority as chairman of the Supreme Council of the Republic of Georgia, making him de facto head of Georgia, although the country was not yet sovereign. Gamsakhurdia was elected as Georgia's new leader by 238 votes to 5.

In April 1991, Gamsakhurdia was among six candidates who registered for the presidential election. The election was held on 26 May in a free and democratic environment. On 28 May 1991, the state newspaper Republic of Georgia released preliminary results showing Gamsakhurdia leading by a large margin, with 86.52% of the votes, while Valerian Advadze, who came in second, received 7.52%. On 3 June, the Central Election Commission approved the summary protocol of the election, according to which 86.5% of voters, or 2,565,362 out of 3,594,810, had voted for Zviad Gamsakhurdia.

=== Programme ===
According to Stephen F. Jones, a historian specializing in Russian and Eurasian studies, Gamsakhurdia promoted the concept of pan-Caucasian unity, known as the "Caucasian House". Gamsakhurdia advocated regional cooperation among the peoples of the Caucasus and proposed initiatives such as a common economic zone, a "Caucasian Forum" (a regional United Nations) and an alliance against foreign interference. The "Caucasian House" was based on the idea of shared Ibero-Caucasian languages and a common tribal and cultural identity among the indigenous peoples of the Caucasus, including Chechens, Circassians, Abkhazians and Georgians. An alliance between Gamsakhurdia and Chechen President Dzhokhar Dudayev was considered pivotal to its success. However, Gamsakhurdia was overthrown shortly after taking office, and the "realisation of the idea of Caucasianness and the Caucasian House has never gone beyond the declaratory level or imaginative projects...".

In his election program, Gamsakhurdia advocated gradual privatization and a transition from a socialist command economy to a capitalist market economy. He supported a social market economy, a model that would combine "free labor and guarantees of social rights, respect for private property and social utility, free entrepreneurship and honest competition". His proposals included wage indexation, consumer protection, social protection for vulnerable groups, a minimum wage, and unemployment benefits. Gamsakhurdia also supported price controls on certain essential goods.

Gamsakhurdia was deeply religious and believed that societal problems, including crime, stemmed from the loss of faith, moral decline, and the abandonment and degradation of spiritual ideals. He argued that Georgia's struggle for independence involved not only "national and political goals" but also "a moral revival based on religious faith and conscience".

Gamsakhurdia and his supporters advocated a strong presidential system. They argued that, to overcome the country's challenges, Georgia needed a strong president elected by universal suffrage. These views were shared by most Georgians. In an interview, Gamsakhurdia cited Charles de Gaulle as his "political ideal".

=== Policies ===
==== Domestic policy ====
Upon Gamsakhurdia taking office in November 1990, one of the first laws passed by the Supreme Council of Georgia under his leadership renamed the Georgian Soviet Socialist Republic the "Republic of Georgia" and restored the state hymn (Dideba), flag and state emblem of the First Republic of Georgia. The Supreme Council also declared a "transitional period" leading to independence, during which the newly elected government was to prepare the political, legal and economic foundations for Georgia's sovereign existence. The Supreme Council appointed Tengiz Sigua, a member of the opposition Rustaveli Society, as chairman of the Georgian Council of Ministers, a position later renamed prime minister.

Although state institutions continued to operate under the 1976 Constitution of the Georgian SSR, several amendments were adopted following independence to establish a presidential republic. Gamsakhurdia sought to eliminate mafia influence from Soviet-era institutions, including the KGB, military and police. One of his first conflicts with Mikhail Gorbachev concerned the appointment of the head of the Georgian KGB. Gamsakhurdia also took steps to establish a military structure independent of Soviet control. In December 1990, the Supreme Council of Georgia adopted a law ending the Soviet military draft in Georgia. As a result, only 10% of eligible conscripts responded to the call-up, the lowest proportion among the Soviet republics. In January 1991, the Supreme Council approved legislation establishing the National Guard of Georgia. The first military parade was held on Independence Day in 1991, with 10,000 soldiers of the National Guard taking their oath of service in front of President Zviad Gamsakhurdia at Boris Paichadze Stadium. Soviet president Mikhail Gorbachev, through the chairman of the Supreme Soviet of the USSR, Anatoly Lukyanov, instructed Gamsakhurdia to ban the creation of the Guard. The official newspaper of the Soviet Army, Krasnaya Zvezda, published an article mocking the National Guard entitled "Mr. Prefects and Mr. Guardsmen".

Georgia held a referendum on restoring its pre-Soviet independence on 31 March 1991 in which 98.9% of those who voted declared in its favour. The Georgian parliament passed a declaration of independence on 9 April 1991, in effect restoring the 1918–1921 Georgian sovereign state. However, it was not recognized by the Soviet Union and although a number of foreign powers granted early recognition, universal recognition did not come until the following year. Romania became the first country to recognize the Georgian independence, on 26 August 1991.

In February 1991, the Supreme Council, under the leadership of Zviad Gamsakhurdia, enacted a reform of local self-government, replacing the Soviet district committees with local councils known as sakrebulos (Georgian: sakrebulo; singular). These bodies were to be elected every four years in local elections using the single transferable vote system, which allowed numerous minor parties and independent candidates to gain representation in the councils. The reform introduced a two-tier system of local self-government, comprising village and town sakrebulos at the first level and district sakrebulos at the second. The district sakrebulos were to be composed of the chairpersons of town and village sakrebulos. The Soviet executive committees were abolished and replaced by prefectures headed by prefects, district-level executives appointed by the Georgian government. The Supreme Council scheduled Georgia's first local elections for 31 March 1991. Although the electoral law and the law on local self-government were passed, the refinement of the legislative framework continued after the elections. The Round Table coalition won a majority of the seats.

On 3 March 1991, Zviad Gamsakhurdia established Mother's Day in Georgia, and the decision was approved by the Supreme Council of Georgia. Initially, the holiday was intended to replace the Soviet-era celebration of International Women's Day on 8 March, but it was ultimately decided to retain both holidays. Georgia thus became the only country in the region to celebrate Mother's Day as a separate holiday.

In August 1991, Georgia created a national bank and the legislature committed Georgia to issue its own currency in the future. In September 1991, the law on privatization was passed after long discussions on how to prevent "party-economic mafia" (a term used by Gamsakhurdia to refer to Communist Party leaders and administrators at various levels who controlled shadow economy of the Soviet Georgia) from becoming the primary beneficiary. On 3 May 1991, Gamsakhurdia issued a decree implementing fixed prices for some basic goods and lifting the national 5-percent sales tax on some food and services.

The first steps towards the abolition of death penalty in Georgia came during the government of Gamsakhurdia on 20 March 1991, when the Georgian Supreme Council removed this possible punishment for four economic offences not involving the use of violence. Thus, Georgia became a first former Soviet republic to take steps to abolish the death penalty.

On 11 November 1991, Zviad Gamsakhurdia announced the nationalization of Soviet armed forces property located on the territory of Georgia.

==== Foreign policy ====
During his rule, Gamsakhurdia maintained that Georgia would not sign the New Union Treaty or an interrepublican economic treaty. In July 1991, Georgia was among six Soviet republics, alongside Estonia, Lithuania, Latvia, Moldova, and Armenia, that rejected the New Union Treaty. Gamsakhurdia called for a boycott of the 1991 Soviet Union referendum on the preservation of the Soviet Union, and the Supreme Council of Georgia voted to support the boycott. Gamsakhurdia argued that "the USSR law on referendum violates the sovereignty of the Republic of Georgia, because with this law the destiny of Georgia would be decided not by its citizens, but by citizens of all union republics in the Soviet Union". In response to the Soviet referendum, the Supreme Council of Georgia scheduled the 1991 Georgian independence referendum. On 15 June 1991, in an interview with Saarländischer Rundfunk, Gamsakhurdia stated that Georgia sought eventual membership in the European Community and the United Nations, while intending to develop relations with the USSR as a foreign state.

In response to the Soviet crackdown on the pro-independence movement in Lithuania in January 1991, Zviad Gamsakhurdia led a pro-Lithuanian rally in Tbilisi, where he declared that "it is impossible to preserve an empire by democratic means" and called on the opposition to the Kremlin.

On 31 March 1991, the day of the 1991 Georgian independence referendum, an American delegation led by Richard Nixon arrived in Georgia and met with Zviad Gamsakhurdia. Although unofficial, the visit had been arranged by US president George H. W. Bush. During the meeting, Gamsakhurdia stated that "there is no 'Soviet people', but [only] the nations conquered by the Soviet Union". Two weeks earlier, on 15 March, Gamsakhurdia met with James Baker at the US Embassy in Moscow. In response to the claim that "Gorbachev's Perestroika and democratic reforms would change the situation in the Soviet Union", Gamsakhurdia argued that these reforms were merely a façade intended "to preserve the neocolonialism and the imperial structures". He stated that he would consider Gorbachev's reforms genuine only if Gorbachev amended the USSR's law on secession to make it more "fair".

In an attempt to resolve the South Ossetia conflict, Gamsakhurdia met with Boris Yeltsin, Chairman of the Supreme Soviet of the Russian SFSR, in Kazbegi in March 1991. During the negotiations, they agreed to establish a joint Russian–Georgian commission comprising the two republics' ministries of internal affairs to investigate the situation in the region, restore order, and disarm illegal armed groups.

On 6–7 April 1991, representatives of Armenia, Georgia, Estonia, Latvia, Lithuania, and Moldova met in Chișinău, Moldova, and pledged to cooperate in their efforts to achieve independence.

As Georgia moved towards independence from the Soviet Union, the government led by Zviad Gamsakhurdia told Boris Yeltsin that "after the fall of the Soviet Union, the only legitimate framework for relations between the Russian Federation and Georgia can be the treaty signed between Soviet Russia and the Democratic Republic of Georgia in Moscow on 7 May 1920". Under the treaty, Soviet Russia granted de jure recognition of Georgia's independence in exchange for a commitment not to allow troops of powers hostile to Bolshevik Russia to use Georgian territory. Moscow rejected this position, and Georgia declared Soviet troops stationed on its territory to be an occupation force.

In July 1991, Levon Ter-Petrosyan, chairman of the Armenian Supreme Council, visited Tbilisi and met with Georgian president Zviad Gamsakhurdia.

On 3 July 1991, at a press conference, President Gamsakhurdia stated that Georgia had no intention of considering membership in NATO.

In response to George H. W. Bush's Chicken Kiev speech, in which he supported Soviet president Mikhail Gorbachev and his proposed New Union Treaty, the Georgian government issued a statement declaring: "The heir of Washington, Jefferson, Lincoln and others arrives ... and carries on propaganda in favor of the Union Treaty. Why didn't he call on Kuwait to sign the Union Treaty with Iraq?".

Gamsakhurdia established close ties with Chechnya, a breakaway republic within Russia. In the spring of 1991, he met with Chechen leader Dzhokhar Dudayev in Kazbegi at a meeting arranged by Aslan Abashidze, leader of the Adjarian Autonomous Republic. Gamsakhurdia welcomed Chechnya's declaration of independence in November 1991 and attended the inauguration of Dzhokhar Dudayev as president of Chechnya in Grozny. Although Chechnya received no international recognition, it received support from Georgia, which provided a route to the outside world. As a show of support, on 11 November 1991, Gamsakhurdia wrote to the United Nations and Russian president Boris Yeltsin, condemning Yeltsin's declaration of a state of emergency in Chechnya following its proclamation of sovereignty as "a show of force against the Chechen people". Gamsakhurdia and Dudaev agreed in 1991 to construct a Georgian–Chechen highway that would connect Chechnya to Georgia and, through Georgia, to the rest of the world, bypassing Russia. Construction was interrupted following Gamsakhurdia's overthrow but resumed in 1996 under President Eduard Shevardnadze.

On 13 March 1992, Zviad Gamsakhurdia, who was at the time living in exile in Chechnya, signed a decree in Grozny recognizing the independence of the Chechen Republic of Ichkeria. On 20 February 1992, Zviad Gamsakhurdia and Chechen president Dzhokhar Dudayev signed a joint communiqué in Grozny. It called for the "goodwill of the Caucasian peoples" to resolve all interethnic and interstate conflicts in the region peacefully and "only at the negotiating table". The two sides reached agreements on several issues, including "the resolution of the disputed question of the return of Ingush lands only at the negotiating table and without the participation of a third side" and "the inviolability of historical borders", meaning that South Ossetia must remain part of Georgia. The communiqué called on Russia to play a "positive role" in normalizing the situation in the Caucasus by withdrawing its troops from the region as a "first positive step in this direction". It also emphasized the need to establish a "pan-Caucasian home" in the form of a Union of Caucasian States.

=== Civil conflicts ===
==== South Ossetia ====
In 1989, violent unrest broke out between the Georgian independence-minded population of the region and Ossetians loyal to the Soviet Union in South Ossetian Autonomous Oblast. In September 1990 Ossetian nationalists in the South Ossetia's regional soviet declared independence from Georgia by announcing "South Ossetian Soviet Democratic Republic" loyal to Moscow. In response, the Supreme Soviet of the Georgian SSR annulled the autonomy of South Ossetia. Following clashes between Georgians and South Ossetians on 12 December 1990 Gamsakhurdia declared a state of emergency in the region.

==== Coup d'état ====
Gamsakhurdia's rule began amid strong opposition from the National Congress, a parallel body established by the opposing faction of the national liberation movement. Although the Communist Party had weakened significantly and was unable to transform itself from a ruling party into an effective opposition, the National Congress refused to recognize the legitimacy of the official elections and the new government, continuing to use the same methods it had employed against Soviet rule, including street demonstrations, rallies, and hunger strikes.

During the 1991 Soviet coup attempt, the Russian news agency Interfax reported that Gamsakhurdia had reached an agreement with the Soviet military to disarm the Georgian National Guard. On 23 August, he issued decrees abolishing the post of commander of the Georgian National Guard and redesignating its members as internal troops subordinate to the Georgian Ministry of Internal Affairs. In reality, the National Guard was already part of the Ministry of Internal Affairs. Gamsakhurdia argued that he had reorganized the National Guard into internal troops solely to protect it from the GKChP, which had ordered the dissolution of all armed formations established in violation of the Soviet Constitution and laws. His opponents claimed that he supported the Soviet coup attempt and sought to disband the National Guard. However, when asked to produce the documents they claimed supported their allegations, they failed to do so. Gamsakhurdia consistently maintained that he had no intention of disbanding the National Guard and accused the opposition of colluding with the Soviet-era elite. In defiance of Gamsakhurdia's alleged order, the dismissed National Guard commander Tengiz Kitovani led most of his troops out of Tbilisi on 24 August. By this time, however, the coup had clearly failed, and Gamsakhurdia publicly congratulated Russian President Boris Yeltsin on his victory over the putschists.

Political tensions escalated in September, with daily rallies both for and against the president in Tbilisi. The country was gripped by unrest as clashes erupted between the opposition and the government. Demonstrations demanding Gamsakhurdia's resignation were joined by rebel units of the National Guard. Both rebel members of the Georgian National Guard and pro-Gamsakhurdia troops deployed armored personnel carriers and artillery in the city. The opposition ignored Gamsakhurdia's call to disarm. Rebel members of the National Guard seized the television center in Tbilisi and clashed with police near the central power station, leaving four people dead and four wounded.

Gamsakhurdia reacted angrily, accusing shadowy forces in Moscow of conspiring with his domestic opponents against Georgia's independence movement. At a rally in early September, he told his supporters: "The infernal machinery of the Kremlin will not prevent us from becoming free.... Having defeated the traitors, Georgia will achieve its ultimate freedom." He shut down the opposition newspaper Molodiozh Gruzii on the grounds that it had published explicit calls for a national rebellion. Giorgi Chanturia, whose National Democratic Party was one of the most active opposition groups at the time, was arrested and imprisoned on charges of seeking assistance from Moscow to overthrow the legally constituted government. It was also reported that Channel 2, a television station, was shut down after its employees took part in anti-government rallies.

On 22 December 1991, armed opposition supporters launched a violent coup d'état and attacked several government buildings, including the Georgian parliament building, where Gamsakhurdia himself was sheltering. Heavy fighting continued in Tbilisi until 6 January 1992, leaving hundreds dead and the city centre heavily damaged. On 6 January, Gamsakhurdia and members of his government escaped through opposition lines and made their way to Azerbaijan, where they were denied asylum. Armenia subsequently hosted Gamsakhurdia for a short period and rejected Georgian demands for his extradition. To avoid further straining its already tense relations with Georgia, the Armenian authorities allowed Gamsakhurdia to move to the breakaway Russian republic of Chechnya, where he was granted asylum by the rebel government of General Dzhokhar Dudayev.

A Military Council composed of Gamsakhurdia's opponents took power on an interim basis. One of the Military Council's first actions was to remove Gamsakhurdia from the presidency. Gamsakhurdia's supporters continued to hold rallies in support of the ousted president. On several occasions, the Military Council's forces opened fire with automatic weapons to disperse protesters, resulting in several deaths. The order to shoot was given by Jaba Ioseliani, the leader of the Mkhedrioni paramilitary group.

It was later alleged that Russian forces had been involved in the coup against Gamsakhurdia. On 15 December 1992, the Russian newspaper Moskovskiye Novosti published a letter claiming that Colonel General Sufian Bepayev, former Vice-Commander of the Transcaucasian Military District, had sent a "subdivision" to assist the armed opposition. According to the letter, without this intervention, "Gamsakhurdia supporters would have been guaranteed victory." It was also alleged that Soviet special forces had helped the opposition attack the state television tower on 28 December.

The Military Council reconstituted itself as the State Council in March 1992 and, without a formal referendum or election, appointed Gamsakhurdia's longtime rival, Eduard Shevardnadze, as its chairman. Shevardnadze then ruled as the de facto president until the presidency was formally restored in November 1995.

== In exile ==
After his overthrow, Gamsakhurdia continued to claim that he was the legitimate president of Georgia. Some governments and international organizations continued to recognize him as such, although, as a matter of pragmatic politics, the insurrectionist Military Council was quickly accepted as the country's governing authority. Gamsakhurdia refused to accept his ouster, not least because he had been elected by an overwhelming majority of the popular vote, in contrast to Shevardnadze, who had been appointed without an election.

In November–December 1992, he was invited to Finland by the Georgia Friendship Group of the Parliament of Finland and to Austria by the International Society for Human Rights. In both countries, he held press conferences and met with parliamentarians and government officials.

== Return ==
On 24 September 1993, Zviad Gamsakhurdia returned to Georgia, arriving in Zugdidi, which was controlled by his rebellious supporters, and in October led an uprising to oust the government of Eduard Shevardnadze, capturing several important sites in western Georgia. However, the tide changed on 19 October after Eduard Shevardnadze asked for Russian assistance, in return of making Georgia join the Commonwealth of Independent States. On 6 November, the rebels' last stronghold, Zugdidi, fell to government forces, ending the six-week-old insurgency and forcing Gamsakhurdia and his associates into hiding.

== Death ==
In December 1993, it became increasingly difficult for Zviad Gamsakhurdia to evade the government forces searching for him, but he refused his supporters' offers to return to Chechnya. Repeated journeys through mountainous terrain in the early winter cold, combined with an almost complete lack of medicine and sanitary facilities, adversely affected the health of Gamsakhurdia and those accompanying him. According to the memoirs of Gamsakhurdia's loyalist prime minister, Besarion Gugushvili, who accompanied him, Zviad was staying with Gugushvili and a group of bodyguards in the village of Jikhashkari, in Zugdidi District, in mid-December. They spent the last few days of December in the village of Dzveli Khibula, in the mountainous part of Samegrelo, in Khobi District, where a local family provided them with shelter. During those final days, Gamsakhurdia's health continued to deteriorate. There were seven people in total in the house in Dzveli Khibula where Gamsakhurdia was staying: Zviad himself, Gugushvili, two bodyguards, and the homeowner, his wife, and their son. Gamsakhurdia and his companions occupied the second floor. He and Gugushvili slept in the same bed in one room, while the two bodyguards slept in another room.

On 31 December 1993, Zviad Gamsakhurdia died in circumstances that remain unclear. He is known to have died in the village of Dzveli Khibula in the Samegrelo region of western Georgia. The Georgian government announced Gamsakhurdia's death on 5 January 1994. Some people refused to believe that he had died, but the question was eventually settled when his body was recovered on 15 February 1994.

Years later, Avtandil Ioseliani, head of the interim government's counterintelligence service, admitted that two special units had been hunting Zviad Gamsakhurdia on the interim government's orders.

In the first days of December 1993, two members of Gamsakhurdia's personal guard also disappeared without a trace after being sent on a reconnaissance mission. Some unidentified human remains and ashes were found 17 years later.

=== Theories ===
Various explanations have been offered for Gamsakhurdia's death, which remains controversial and unresolved. On 14 December 2018, Constantine and Tsotne Gamsakhurdia, the former president's two sons, expressed concern that the statute of limitations for investigating their father's death was due to expire at the end of the year, as Georgian law set a 25-year limit for investigations into serious crimes. They subsequently announced that they would begin a hunger strike.

On 21 December, newly inaugurated President Salome Zurabishvili formally endorsed the request to extend the statute of limitations, a move supported by members of both the opposition and the ruling party in Parliament. Less than a week later, Parliament approved a bill extending the statute of limitations for serious crimes from 25 to 30 years after the crime was committed. The bill was approved following Constantine Gamsakhurdia's hospitalization.

On 26 December 2018, following the establishment of a new investigative group led by Prosecutor General Shalva Tadumadze, which promised to reopen the investigation into Zviad Gamsakhurdia's death, Tsotne Gamsakhurdia ended his hunger strike. In late 2023, the Parliament of Georgia adopted further amendments to the Criminal Code, proposed by the Prosecutor's Office, abolishing the statute of limitations for certain crimes resulting in death and allowing the investigation into Gamsakhurdia's death to continue beyond the previously extended deadline. However, the investigation has failed to reach a conclusion, and numerous theories about Gamsakhurdia's death continue to circulate in public discourse.

==== Suicide ====
In January 1994, Gamsakhurdia's widow, Manana Archvadze-Gamsakhurdia, told the Interfax news agency that her husband had shot himself on 31 December after being surrounded by forces of the pro-Shevardnadze Mkhedrioni militia. The Russian media reported that Gamsakhurdia's bodyguards heard a muffled shot in the adjoining room of the house where they were temporarily staying and found him dead from a gunshot wound to the head, reportedly inflicted with a Stechkin pistol. Gamsakhurdia's press service in Grozny published what it claimed was his suicide note: "Being in clear state of mind, I commit this act in token of protest against the ruling regime in Georgia and because I am deprived of the possibility, acting as the president, to normalize the situation, and to restore law and order."

==== Assassination ====
On 25 January 1994, Gamsakhurdia's son Konstantine Gamsakhurdia told Le Monde that his father "was murdered".

Despite initially claiming that her husband's death was a suicide, his widow stated in a March 1995 interview with the newspaper Trud that Gamsakhurdia had been killed on the orders of Eduard Shevardnadze by his bodyguards, who had been hiding with him. She accused Gamsakhurdia's finance minister, Guram Abasnadze, of masterminding his murder. She later alleged that Gamsakhurdia's prime minister, Besarion Gugushvili, had ordered one of his bodyguards to kill him.

Several of Gamsakhurdia's bodyguards have claimed that he committed suicide, while his family disputes this account and maintains that he was murdered. In 2007, BBC News reported that some of Gamsakhurdia's friends believed he had committed suicide, "although his widow insists that he was murdered."

In 2001, Igor Giorgadze, a fugitive former head of Georgian intelligence, accused the Georgian special services of murdering Gamsakhurdia.

According to former deputy director of Biopreparat Ken Alibek, that laboratory was possibly involved in the design of an undetectable chemical or biological agent to assassinate Gamsakhurdia.

==== Died in infighting ====
According to another account circulated by Shevardnadze's government in early January 1994, Gamsakhurdia was shot during a skirmish with his own allies following a quarrel. The Georgian news agency, citing a member of the Mkhedrioni paramilitary group, reported that Gamsakhurdia had died in Grozny after being wounded in a fight with his associates. The Georgian Security Ministry stated that Gamsakhurdia had been shot in Grozny on 30 December and died on 5 January. Georgian officials reported that Gamsakhurdia's widow had been "misinformed" and that reports of his suicide were rumors. An aide to Georgian Security Minister David Mumladze said that they "did not believe" that Gamsakhurdia had committed suicide. Mumladze also claimed that Gamsakhurdia might have been murdered by his own supporters to "turn him into a martyr". He suggested that the killing could also have been linked to Gamsakhurdia's falling-out with his former chief commander, Loti Kobalia.

After initially questioning whether Gamsakhurdia had committed suicide, Eduard Shevardnadze sent a group of investigators to Grozny. On 8 January 1994, the investigators reported that Gamsakhurdia had died by suicide.

=== Burial ===
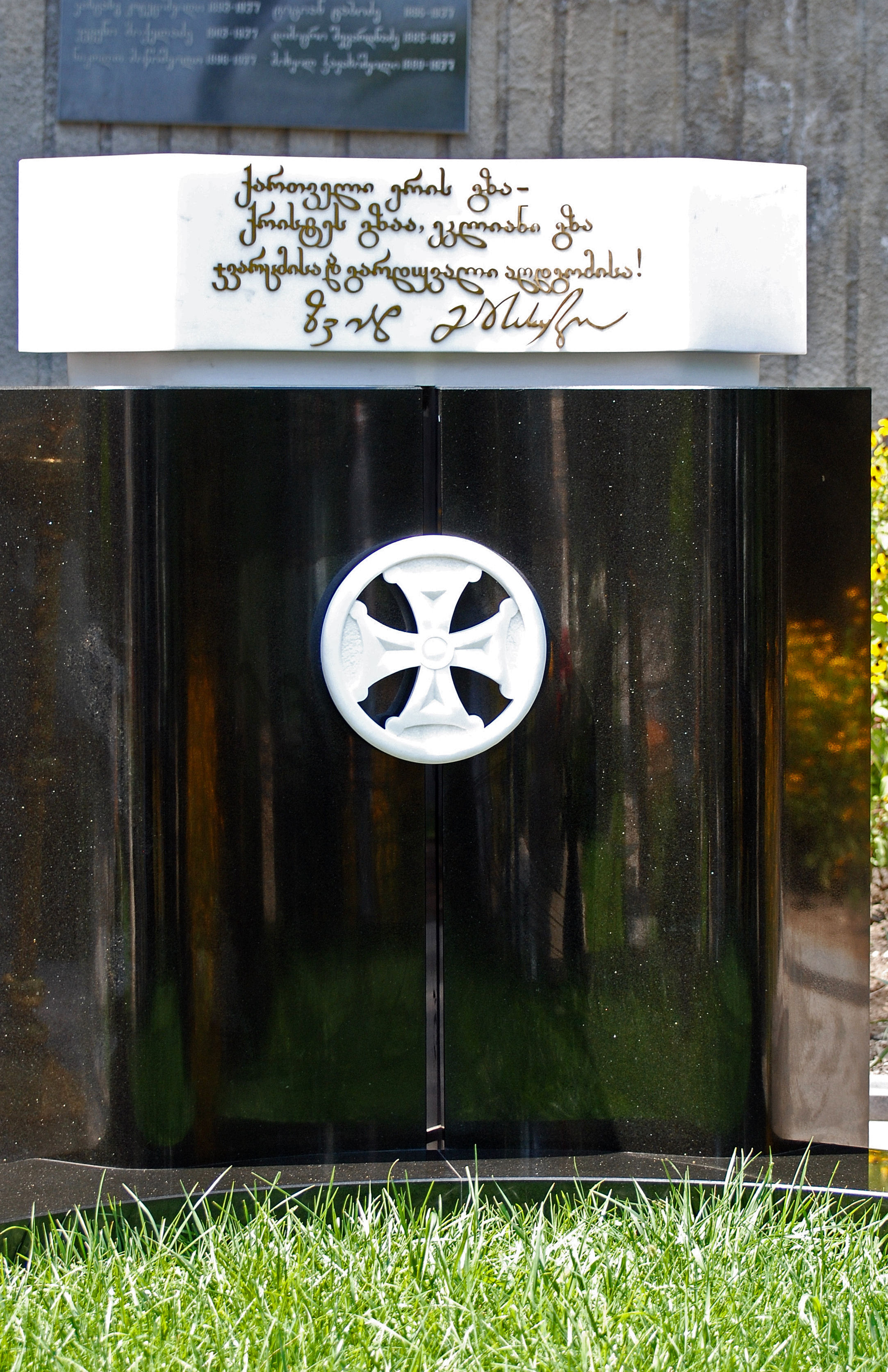
Gravestone of President Gamsakhurdia in Tbilisi.

Gamsakhurdia was initially buried in the village of Dzveli Khibula and later reburied in the village of Jikhashkari, also in the Samegrelo region. Eduard Shevardnadze sent investigators to identify his body. Chechen officials asked Shevardnadze's government to allow Gamsakhurdia's remains to be buried in his family's cemetery next to his home in Tbilisi or, if the request was refused, to transfer his body to Chechnya for burial. There were also calls for a street in Grozny to be named after Gamsakhurdia. In February 1994, a joint Georgian–Chechen commission discovered Gamsakhurdia's body, leading the Georgian government to confirm his death. Georgian and Chechen officials agreed to have Gamsakhurdia's body flown to the Chechen capital, Grozny, where his remains were buried. Dudayev arranged a state funeral and Orthodox Christian last rites for Gamsakhurdia. At his burial in Grozny in February 1994, Dudayev stated: "We are gathered here today to give back to the earth a brave son of the Caucasus, a man who believed in freedom."

On 3 March 2007, the newly appointed president of Chechnya, Ramzan Kadyrov, announced that Gamsakhurdia's grave, which had been lost amid the debris and chaos of war-ravaged Grozny, had been found in the city center. Gamsakhurdia's remains were identified by Russian experts in Rostov-on-Don and arrived in Georgia on 28 March 2007 for reburial. He was interred alongside other prominent Georgians at the Mtatsminda Pantheon on 1 April 2007. Thousands of people from across Georgia gathered at the medieval cathedral in Mtskheta to pay tribute to Gamsakhurdia. "We are implementing the decision which was [taken] in 2004 – to bury President Gamsakhurdia on his native soil. This is a fair and absolutely correct decision," President Mikheil Saakashvili told reporters, according to the Civil Georgia internet news website.

== Personal life ==
In addition to Georgian, Gamsakhurdia was fluent in Russian, French, English, and German. He was a devout adherent of the Georgian Orthodox Church his entire life.

Gamsakhurdia's second wife, Manana Archvadze-Gamsakhurdia, was the first First Lady of independent Georgia. The couple had two sons, Tsotne and Giorgi.

Gamsakhurdia's only son from his first marriage is Konstantine Gamsakhurdia, who became a politician and the leader of the Tavisupleba ("Freedom") political party.

== Legacy ==
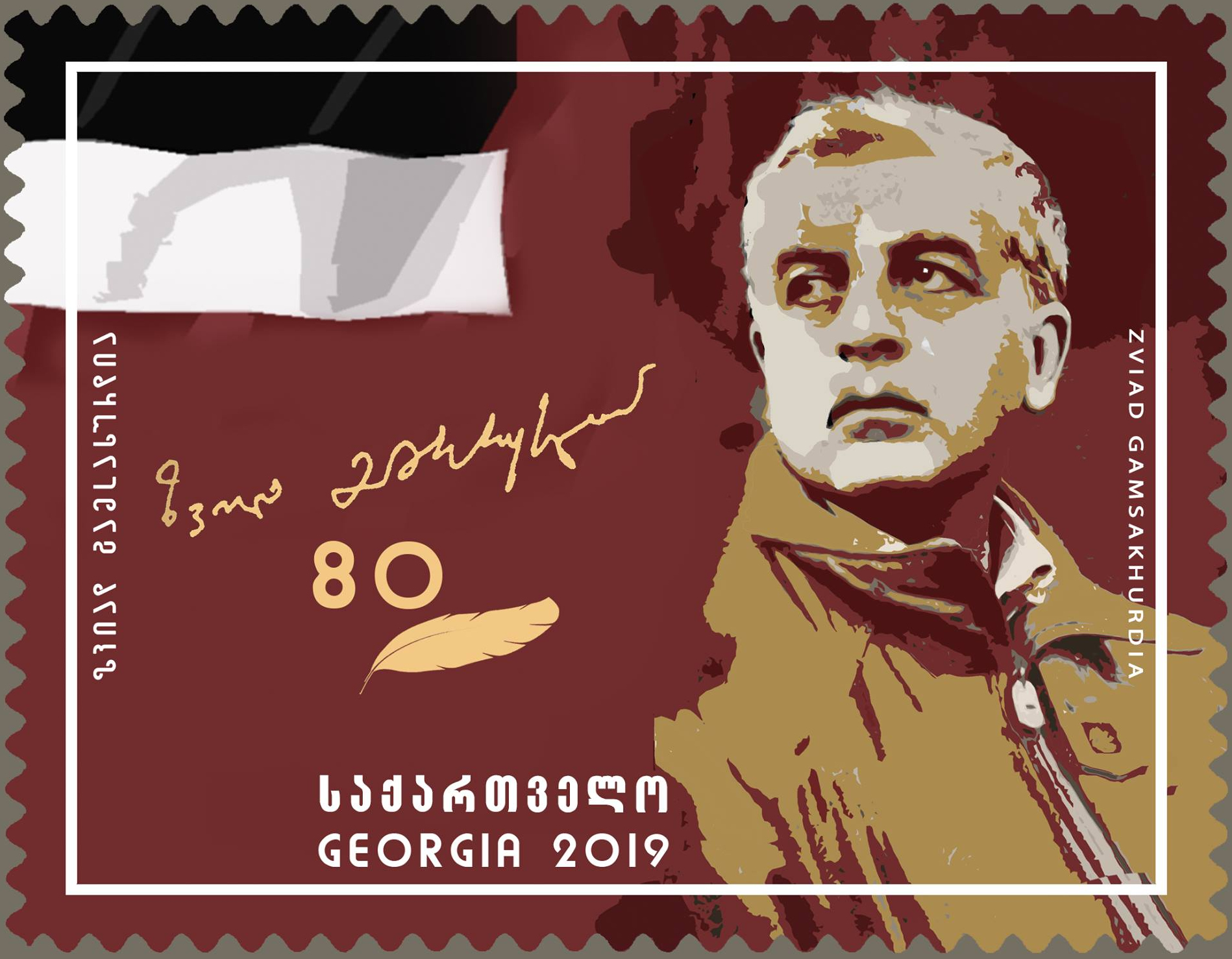
Gamsakhurdia on a 2019 postage stamp commemorating his would-be 80th birthday

On 26 January 2004, at a ceremony held at the Kashueti Church of Saint George in Tbilisi, newly elected President Mikheil Saakashvili officially rehabilitated Gamsakhurdia in an effort to address the lingering political consequences of his overthrow and "put an end to disunity in our society", as Saakashvili put it. He praised Gamsakhurdia's role as a "great statesman and patriot" and issued a decree authorizing the reburial of Gamsakhurdia's remains in the Georgian capital. Saakashvili declared that the "abandon[ment of] the Georgian president's grave in a war zone ... is a shame and disrespectful of one's own self and disrespectful of one's own nation". He also renamed a major road in Tbilisi after Gamsakhurdia and released 32 of his supporters who had been imprisoned by Shevardnadze's government in 1993–1994 and were regarded by many Georgians and some international human rights organizations as political prisoners. In 2013, Gamsakhurdia was posthumously awarded the title and Order of National Hero of Georgia by President Mikheil Saakashvili. His fellow dissident and friend, Merab Kostava, was also posthumously awarded the title and order. Saakashvili called Gamsakhurdia "a leading light of the national idea" who fought for his country's freedom when "no one could even imagine it" and "the majority of us were conformists". In March 2005, the Parliament of Georgia passed a resolution entitled "On the Legal Assessment of the Events of December–January 1991–1992", which denounced Gamsakhurdia's overthrow as an "unconstitutional armed coup". Government officials and members of the public pay tribute to Zviad Gamsakhurdia every year on the anniversary of his birth.

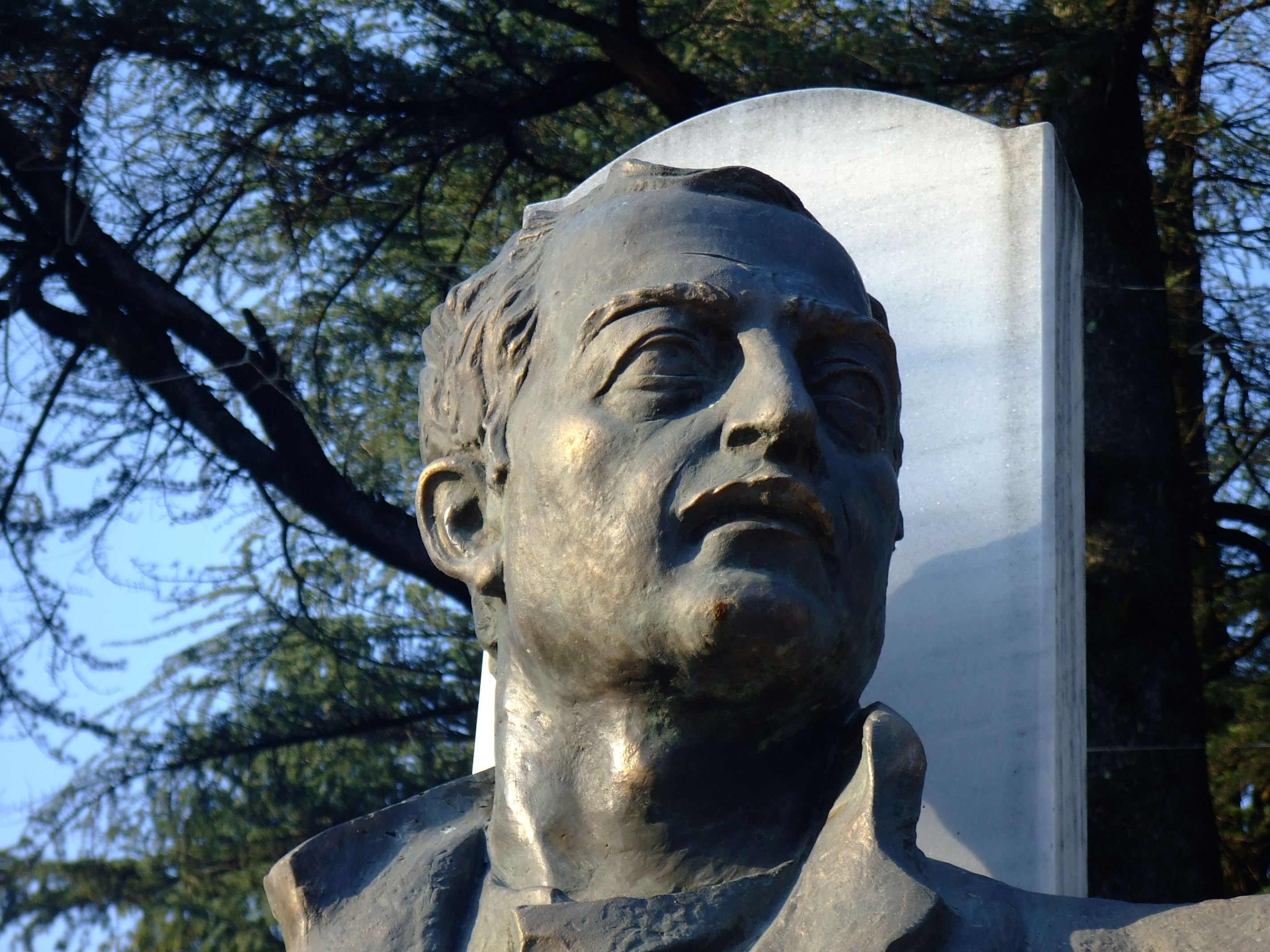
Statue of Zviad Gamsakhurdia in Zugdidi.

In 2014, Georgian President Giorgi Margvelashvili announced a scholarship in honor of Zviad Gamsakhurdia, to be awarded to an outstanding student studying historical literature. In 2019, the plenary chamber of the Parliament of Georgia was named after Zviad Gamsakhurdia. The chairman of Parliament, Irakli Kobakhidze, described Gamsakhurdia as "the symbol of our statehood".

The museum dedicated to Gamsakhurdia's life is located in the village of Dzveli Khibula, where he spent the final days of his life. On 3 August 2018, the museum was granted the status of an immovable cultural heritage monument by order of the director of the National Agency for the Protection of Cultural Heritage of Georgia.

Gamsakhurdia is regarded as a symbol of Georgian nationalism and the national liberation movement of the 1990s. According to a 2020 poll by the Caucasus Research Resource Centers, 81% of Georgians considered Gamsakhurdia a true Georgian patriot, while 76% believed that his overthrow had been bad for Georgia. Additionally, 50% believed that Georgia's independence would not have been possible without Gamsakhurdia. According to a study by the University of Cambridge, Gamsakhurdia is regarded as one of the principal Georgian national heroes of the 20th century, while his arch-enemy, Eduard Shevardnadze, is viewed as a villain. In a 2019 poll conducted by Edison Research, Gamsakhurdia was voted the best president of Georgia.

== Writings ==
Gamsakhurdia published important scholarly works, including four monographs, on topics related to Russian history, Georgian cultural history, Georgian literature, theology, and the history of American poetry. He translated works by William Shakespeare, Charles Baudelaire, Nikolai Gogol, and others into Georgian. He also wrote poems and fables, which were published. In 1970, Gamsakhurdia became a member of the Writers' Union of Georgia, but was expelled in 1977 for his anti-Soviet dissident activities. Gamsakhurdia was awarded an honorary doctorate by the Georgian National Academy of Sciences for his work The Language of the Forms of the Knight in a Lordly Skin.

=== Selected works ===
- 20th century American Poetry (a monograph). Ganatleba, Tbilisi, 1972 (in Georgian)
- The Man in the Panther's Skin" in English, a monograph, Metsniereba, Tbilisi, 1984, 222 pp. (In Georgian, English summary).
- "Goethe's Weltanschauung from the Anthroposophic point of view.", Tsiskari, Tbilisi, No 5, 1984 (in Georgian), link to Georgian archive version, p.149
- Tropology (Image Language) of "The Man in the Panther's Skin", monograph. Metsniereba, Tbilisi, 1991 (in Georgian)
- Collected articles and Essays. Khelovneba, Tbilisi, 1991 (in Georgian)
- Gamsakhurdia: a Product of the Soviet Union. Janice Bohle, University of Missouri, 1997.
- The Spiritual mission of Georgia (1990)
- "Dilemma for Humanity", Nezavisimaia Gazeta, Moscow, 21 May 1992 (in Russian)
- "Between deserts" (about the creative works of L. N. Tolstoy), Literaturnaia Gazeta, Moscow, No 15, 1993 (in Russian)
- Fables and Tales. Nakaduli, Tbilisi, 1987 (in Georgian)
- The Betrothal of the Moon (Poems). Merani, Tbilisi, 1989 (in Georgian)

== See also ==
- Bibliography of the history of the Caucasus
- Outline of Georgia (country)
- Timeline of Georgian history
- Ilia Chavchavadze – Georgian poet and politician; Georgian Orthodox Church saint (1837–1907)

== Sources ==
- Coppieters, Bruno (2005). "Conclusion" (PDF). In Coppieters, Bruno; Legvold, Robert (eds.). Statehood and Security: Georgia after the Rose Revolution. American Academy studies in global security. American Academy of Arts and Sciences. ISBN 978-0-262-03343-5.
- Ivanauskas, Vilius (1 June 2018). "From Establishment to Dissent: The Cases of the Litterateurs Tomas Venclova and Zviad Gamsakhurdia in Soviet Lithuania and Soviet Georgia". Histoire@Politique. 35 (35). doi:10.4000/histoirepolitique.6377. ISSN 1954-3670. S2CID 208537111.
- Jones, Stephen F. (2006). "Georgia: Nationalism from under the Rubble" (PDF). In Barrington, Lowell (ed.). After Independence: Making and Protecting the Nation in Postcolonial and Postcommunist States. University of Michigan Press. pp. 248–276. doi:10.3998/mpub.126246. ISBN 978-0-472-09898-9. JSTOR 10.3998/mpub.126246.13.
- Parrott, Bruce; Dawisha, Karen (1997). Conflict, Cleavage, and Change in Central Asia and the Caucasus. Cambridge University Press. ISBN 978-0-521-59731-9.
- Baramidze, Ruslan; Rumyantsev, Sergey (7 May 2014). Presidential Elections in the South Caucasus: Political Transformations, Imagined Unity, and Memory Discourses (PDF). Tbilisi: Favorite. ISBN 978-9941-8-6641-8.
- Jones, Stephen (2012). Georgia: A Political History Since Independence. Bloomsbury Academic. ISBN 978-1-84511-338-4.
- Zurcher, Christoph (2009). The Post-Soviet Wars: Rebellion, Ethnic Conflict, and Nationhood in the Caucasus. Cornell University Press. ISBN 9780814797242.
- Slider, Darrell (November–December 1991). "The Politics of Georgia's Independence". Problems of Communism. 40 (6): 63–79.
- Suny, Ronald Grigor (1994). The Making of the Georgian Nation (2nd ed.). Indiana University Press. ISBN 978-0-253-35579-9. OCLC 29908699.
- Tolz, Vera; Newton, Melanie (1993). The USSR In 1991: A Record Of Events. Westview Press. ISBN 9780367312503.

Political offices
Preceded by Soviet era	President of Georgia; 1991–1992	Succeeded by Eduard Shevardnadze
