= Tsaishi cathedral =

Cathedral church of the dioceses of Zugdidi and Tsaishi

Tsaishi Cathedral ცაიშის საკათედრო ტაძარი (in Georgian)
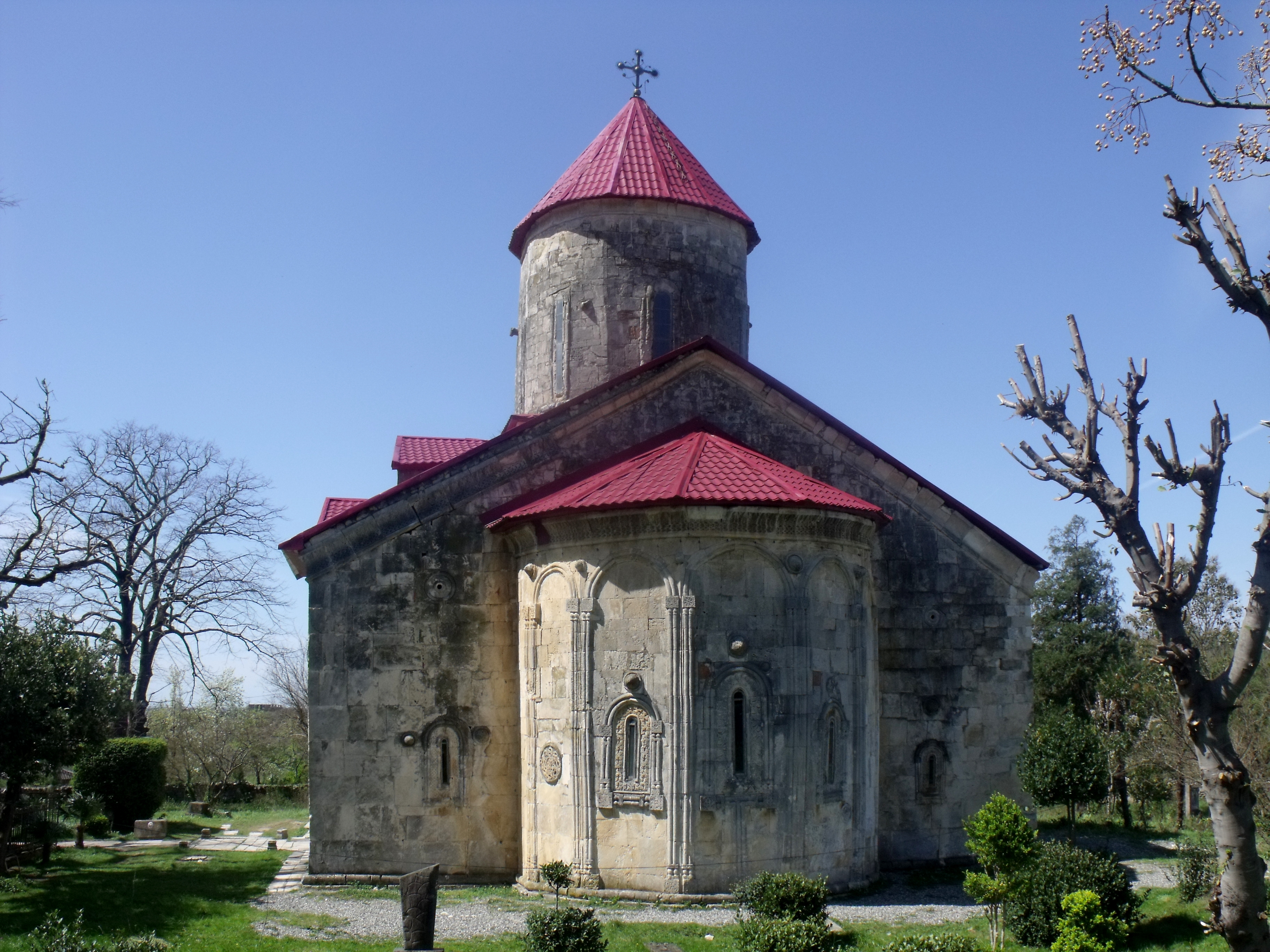
- Tsaishi Cathedral

- Location within Samegrelo-Zemo Svaneti Location within Georgia

Religion
- Affiliation: Georgian Orthodox
- District: Zugdidi Municipality
- Province: Abkhazia

Location
- Location: (Georgia (country)) Samegrelo-Zemo Svaneti, Georgia
- Interactive map of Tsaishi Cathedral ცაიშის საკათედრო ტაძარი (in Georgian)
- Coordinates: 42°25′36″N 41°48′42″E

Architecture
- Type: Church
- Completed: 6th-7th century

The Tsaishi Cathedral (Georgian: ცაიშის საკათედრო ტაძარი, romanized: tsaishis sak'atedro t'adzari) is the cathedral church of the dioceses of Zugdidi and Tsaishi, and headquarters of one of the oldest episcopal departments in Georgia - Eparchy of Zugdidi and Tsaishi.

== History ==
In the 6th and 7th centuries, the episcopal chair already existed in the territory of the church. In the list of episcopal departments from 602 to 610, the Tzayish eparchy in Lazika is mentioned. The oldest Georgian monument, mentioned by the Bishopric of Tsasha, is an inscription on a stone cross from the 10th-11th centuries, where Bishop Ephraim of Tsaishi is mentioned next to the name of King Bagrat III of Georgia.

A modern domed temple was built between the 13th and 14th centuries. It is known that from the 11th century to 1823 the diocese belonged to 20 bishops, among which the most important were Gurieli Malaquías (1612 - 1639) and Grigol Chikovani (1777 - 1823).

Bishop Malachi is known for having completely restored and renovated the Tsaishi church after the devastating earthquake of 1614, while Bishop Grigol is known for having managed to count on the support of Katsii III Dadiani and return the lands taken by the feudal lords to church. In addition, he built a wall and a bell tower around the church. In 1823, the Russian government abolished the bishop of Tsaishi and other bishoprics of Murel. From then until 1879 there was a monastery. The monastery was one of the main places for the dissemination of education since it had a school.

With the arrival of the Bolsheviks in Georgia, the monastery was closed and abandoned. In 1989, with the blessing of Catholics Patriarch of Georgia Elijah II, the monastery was restored. From 1989 until his death, deacon Amiran Shengelia, who was buried near the south gate, was in charge of the temple.

== See also ==
- Eparchy of Zugdidi and Tsaishi

== Literature ==
- გ.კალანდია «ოდიშის საეპისკოპოსოთა ისტორია» (ცაიში, ბედია, მოქვი, ხობი). თბ. 2004 (Г.Каландиа; История Одишского Епископства; (Цаиши, Бедиа, Мокви, Хоби); Тбилиси, 2004)
