= List of libraries in Georgia (country) =

This is a list of libraries in the country of Georgia.

== Libraries by locale ==
=== Abkhazia republic ===
- National Library of the Republic of Abkhazia, Sokhumi

=== Adjara republic ===
- Akaki Tsereteli City Public Library of Batumi, est.1902

=== Guria region ===
- Guria Public Library, 1893-1921 (in Georgian)

=== Imereti region ===
- Kutaisi Ilia Chavchavadze Public Library, est.1873
- Kutaisi State Scientific-Universal Library

=== Kakheti region ===
- Kvareli Library
- Telavi Central Library, 1885-1972 (in Georgian)

=== Kvemo Kartli region ===
- Rustavi Ilia Chavchavadze Main Library, est.1948

=== Samegrelo-Zemo Svaneti region ===
- Zugdidi Municipality Central Library

=== Samtskhe–Javakheti region ===
- Adigeni Library

=== Shida Kartli region ===
- Khashuri Municipality Library

=== Tbilisi ===
- Austrian Library Tbilisi
- Georgian Technical University Central Scientific-Technical Library
- Ilia State University Library
- Ivane Javakhishvili Tbilisi State University Library
- National Parliamentary Library of Georgia
- National Science Library (Georgia), Tbilisi
- Saakashvili Presidential Library, Tbilisi
- Terenti Graneli Library, Orkhevi, Tbilisi

== See also ==
- Copyright law of Georgia
- Georgian literature
- Library associations in Georgia
- Mass media in Georgia (country)
