= Dzveli Khibula =

Dzveli Khibula ძველი ხიბულა
- Village
- Location of Dzveli Khibula Dzveli Khibula (Georgia)
- Coordinates: 42°27′07″N 41°58′50″E
- Country: Georgia
- Region: Samegrelo-Zemo Svaneti
- District: Khobi
- Elevation: 170 m (560 ft)

Population (2014)
  - Total: 712
- Time zone: UTC+4 (Georgian Time)

Dzveli Khibula (Georgian: ძველი ხიბულა; former ხიბულა [Khibula]) is a village located in Khobi Municipality, Samegrelo-Zemo Svaneti, in western Georgia, center of the community. It is located on the right bank of Chanistsqali river, 170 meters above sea level. It is 24 kilometers away from the town of Khobi. The village is known as where the first president of Georgia Zviad Gamsakhurdia (1939-1993), spent the last days of his life.

== History ==
The village of Dzveli Khibula was first mentioned in sources in the 60s of the 16th century. In the 17th century, there were two palaces of Abkhazian Catholics in the village. The ruins of one of the palaces have been preserved.

In 2015, the house in which Gamsakhurdia spent the last days of his life was purchased by one of the public groups; the new owner of the house announced his readiness to transfer the house to the state to create a memorial museum for Zviad Gamsakhurdia. On August 3, 2018, by order of the director of the National Agency for the Protection of Cultural Heritage, this house received the status of an immovable monument of cultural heritage.

== Landmarks ==
Ruins of medieval buildings.
