= Konstantine Gamsakhurdia (politician) =

Konstantine Gamsakhurdia Junior
- კონსტანტინე გამსახურდია უმცროსი

General director of the National Parliamentary Library of Georgia
- Incumbent
- Assumed office 21 January 2024

Member of the Parliament of Georgia
- In office 3 November 2009 – 24 June 2011

Personal details
- Born: 24 June 1961 (age 65) Tbilisi, Georgian SSR, Soviet Union (now Georgia)
- Party: Tavisupleba (2004-2019)
- Occupation: Politician
- Profession: Orientalist

Konstantine "Koko" Gamsakhurdia (Georgian: კონსტანტინე [კოკო] გამსახურდია) (born June 24, 1961) is a Georgian politician and an Iranist. He was the leader of the Tavisupleba ("Freedom") political party and served as the member of the Parliament of Georgia from 2009 to 2011. Since January 2024, he has served as the director general of the National Parliamentary Library of Georgia.

== Biography ==
Konstantine Gamsakhurdia is the only son from the first marriage of Georgia's first President Zviad Gamsakhurdia and grew up in Tbilisi. He is a namesake of his paternal grandfather, Konstantine Gamsakhurdia, the leading 20th-century Georgian novelist. After the 1991-92 coup d'état against his father and the legitimate government, he fled with his family to Switzerland. He lived in Dornach and worked as a translator and as a freelancer for several newspapers.

In 2004, Gamsakhurdia returned to Georgia following the Rose Revolution and the change of government in the country. He began his work as a politician, leading the new Tavisupleba ("Freedom") party. He has been part of the opposition to Mikheil Saakashvili's government since then. He was elected to the Parliament of Georgia during the 2008 Georgian parliamentary election, but refused to take up the seat together with several other opposition politicians, claiming that the polls were rigged. He ultimately agreed to regain the seat and joined the Parliament in November 2009, becoming a chair of the parliamentary commission investigating the death of the late President Zviad Gamsakhurdia.

In 2011, Gamsakhurdia left his seat in the parliament and accepted the position of Georgia's representative in the World Meteorological Organization. He served on various diplomatic positions in the Georgia's embassies to Germany and Switzerland from 2019 to 2024. In January 2024, he accepted the offer from the Chairperson of the Parliament of Georgia Shalva Papuashvili to become the general director of the National Parliamentary Library of Georgia.

== Personal life ==
Gamsakhurdia is married and has two sons.

== Publications (selection) ==
- Zviad Gamsakhurdia. Dissident - Präsident - Märtyrer, Basel 1995, Perseus-Verlag, ISBN 3-907564-19-7

Contributions

- Beiträge zur Geschichte der Humboldt-Universität zu Berlin, Part 2, Edeltraud Krüger, Berlin (East) 1982
