= Kutaisi State Scientific-Universal Library =

Library in Kutaisi, Georgia

Kutaisi State Scientific Universal Library Georgian: ქუთაისის სახელმწიფო სამეცნიერო-უნივერსალური ბიბლიოთეკა
- 42.2720448°N 42.7025576°E
- Location: Kutaisi, Georgia, Georgia
- Type: Public, library.

Kutaisi State Scientific Universal Library is a library in Kutaisi, Georgia.

== See also ==
- Ilia Chavchavadze
- List of libraries in Georgia (country)
