= Chakvinji fortress =

Fortress in Georgia

- ჭაქვინჯის ციხე
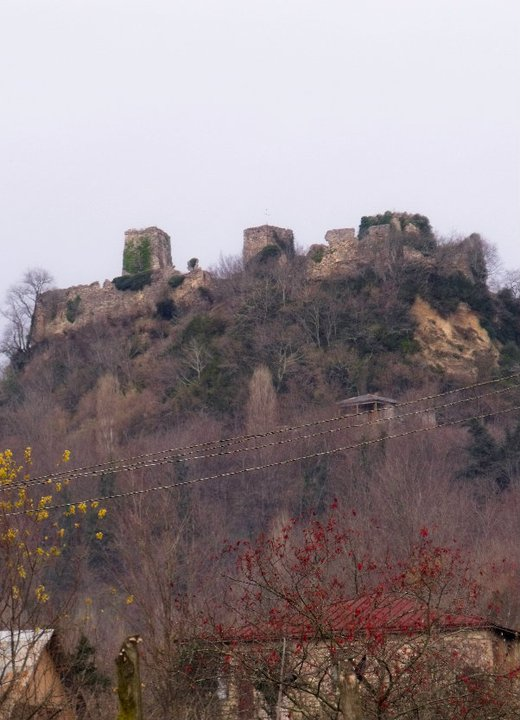
- Chakvinji fortress
- Interactive map of Chakvinji fortress
- Location: Jikhashkari Zugdidi Municipality, Samegrelo-Zemo Svaneti, Georgia
- Coordinates: 42°30′06″N 42°01′08″E
- Type: Cyclopean fortress

The Chakvinji fortress (Georgian: ჭაქვინჯის ციხე) also known as Jikhashkari fortress is located at the municipality of Zugdidi at the Samegrelo-Zemo Svaneti region, in the village of Jikhashkari, on the banks of the Chanistsqali river, built on a high mountain.

== History ==
The famous 18th-century Georgian historian and geographer Vakhushti Batonishvili described the area of the fortress as a summer palace of. Samegrelo. In this fortress was born the last great character Dadiani, David, on January 26, 1813.

The fort was originally built during the period of the Kingdom of Abkhazia (Egrisi-Abkhazia) in the 8th century AD. Later it was reconstructed in the 12th century AD and significantly restored in the 16th or 17th century AD.

In 1905, during the revolution, Adelkhanov forces invaded Jihaskari, Chakvinji, and their adjacent villages. In the days of struggle for the establishment of Soviet power in Georgia, the forces Mensheviks occupied Jihaskari fortress, from where there was a counterattack by the local population. The Mensheviks were expelled by the Bolsheviks.

According to archaeological studies conducted in the fortress, Chakvini had a citadel, towers, and a church along with other structures. In 2017, local media reported that the fortress was seriously damaged and about to collapse. Despite being a monument of national importance, until October 2017, no rehabilitation work had been carried out.

== Literature ==
- Soviet Soviet Encyclopedia, T. XI, Tb., 1987.
- Zakaraia P., Old Castles of Georgia, Tb., 1988.
- P. Zakaraia, h. Kapanadze - "Tsikhioghi-Archaeopolis-Nokalakevi Architecture", "Science" editorial, Tb. 1991
