= Eparchy of Zugdidi and Tsaishi =

Georgian Orthodox Church diocese

- Coat of Arms of Georgian Apostolic Autocephalous Orthodox Church

Location
- Territory: Zugdidi and Tsalenjikha municipalities, Samegrelo-Zemo Svaneti
- Headquarters: Zugdidi, Georgia

Information
- Denomination: Eastern Orthodox
- Sui iuris church: Georgian Orthodox Church
- Established: 1995
- Language: Georgian

Current leadership
- Bishop: Mitropolitian Gerasim (Sharashenidze)

Map

The Eparchy of Zugdidi and Tsaishi (Georgian: ზუგდიდისა და ცაიშის ეპარქია) is an eparchy (diocese) of the Georgian Orthodox Church with its seat in Zugdidi, Georgia. It has jurisdiction over Zugdidi and Tsalenjikha municipalities in Georgia.

== Heads ==
Picture	Name	Time
Georgian Orthodox Eparchy of Zugdidi and Tsaishi
	Daniel	1995—1998
	Gerasime	since 1998

== See also ==
- Eparchies of the Georgian Orthodox Church
