= Jikhashkari =

Jikhashkari ჯიხაშკარი
- Village
- Location in Georgia Jikhashkari (Georgia)
- Coordinates: 42°30′6.12″N 42°1′8.04″E
- Country: (Georgia (country)) Georgia
- Region: Samegrelo-Zemo Svaneti
- District: Zugdidi
- Elevation: 150 m (490 ft)

Population (2014)
  - Total: 1,327
- Time zone: UTC+4 (Georgian Time)

Jikhashkari or Djikhasjkari (Georgian: ჯიხაშკარი) is a mountainous village in Zugdidi District, Samegrelo-Zemo Svaneti region, Georgia in Chanistsqali river gorge.

== History ==
The XVIII century Jikhashkari fortress was an important trading post on Black Sea Silk Road Corridor in historical Odishi. The fortress citadel on a mountaintop and a lower fortress connected to the large courtyard. The Summer palace of the Dadiani family, the rulers of Samegrelo, used to be here.

== See also ==
- Chakvinji fortress
- Samegrelo-Zemo Svaneti
