= National Library of Georgia =

Coordinates: 41.6972°N 44.8006°E

National Library of Georgia საქართველოს ეროვნული ბიბლიოთეკა
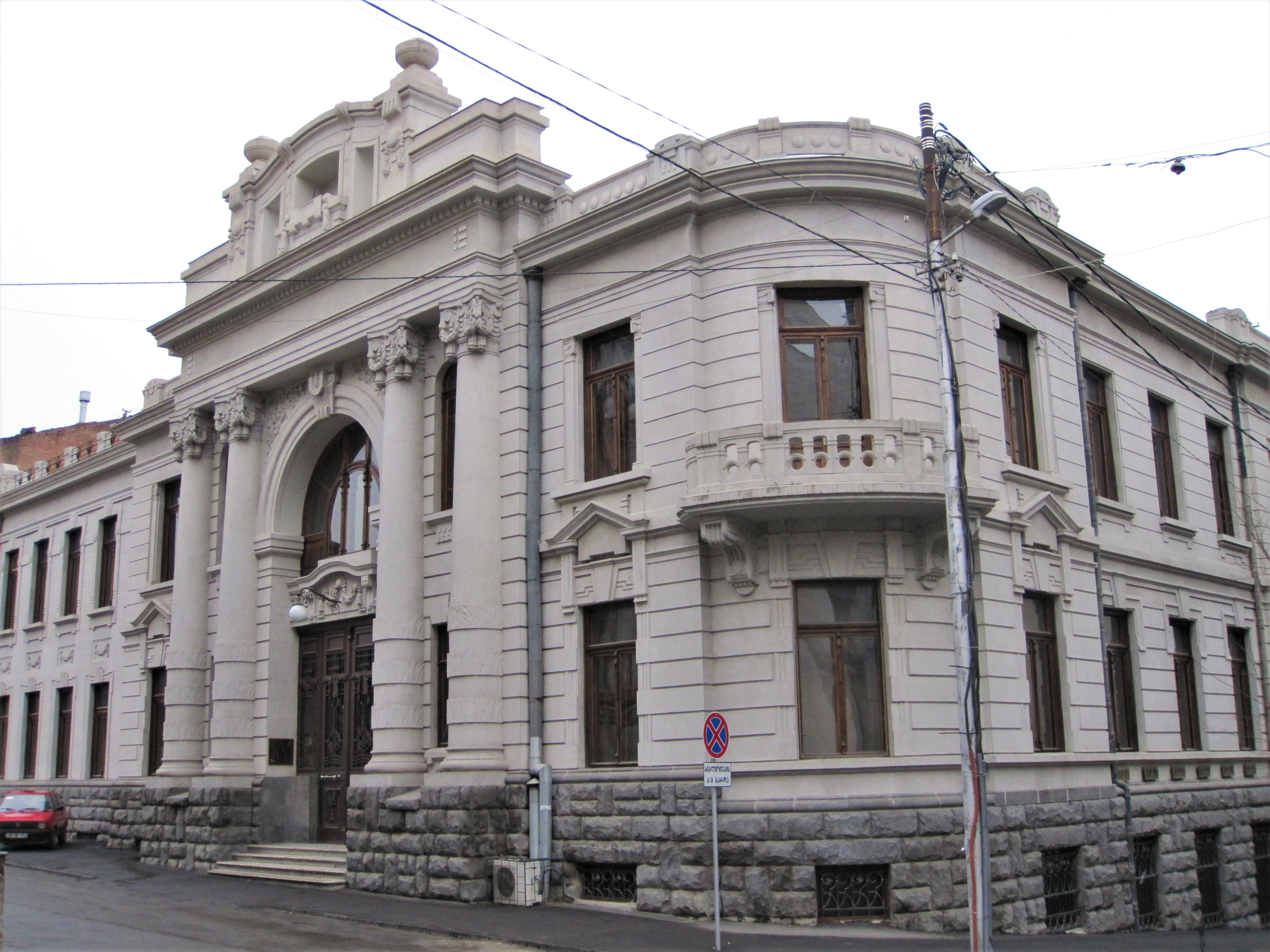
- The National Library of Georgia
- Location: 3 Gudiashvili St. Tbilisi, Georgia, Georgia
- Type: Public, National library.
- Established: 1846 (180 years ago)

Collection
- Legal deposit: Yes

Other information
- Director: Konstantine Gamsakhurdia
- Website: www.nplg.gov.ge

LEPL Ilia Chavchavadze National Library of Georgia (Georgian: სსიპ ილია ჭავჭავაძის სახელობის საქართველოს ეროვნული ბიბლიოთეკა, sakartvelos erovnuli bibliotek'a) is a legal entity of public law under the Ministry of Culture of Georgia. It is the main book depository of Georgia, as well as the most important cultural, educational, scientific, informational and methodological centre.

== History ==
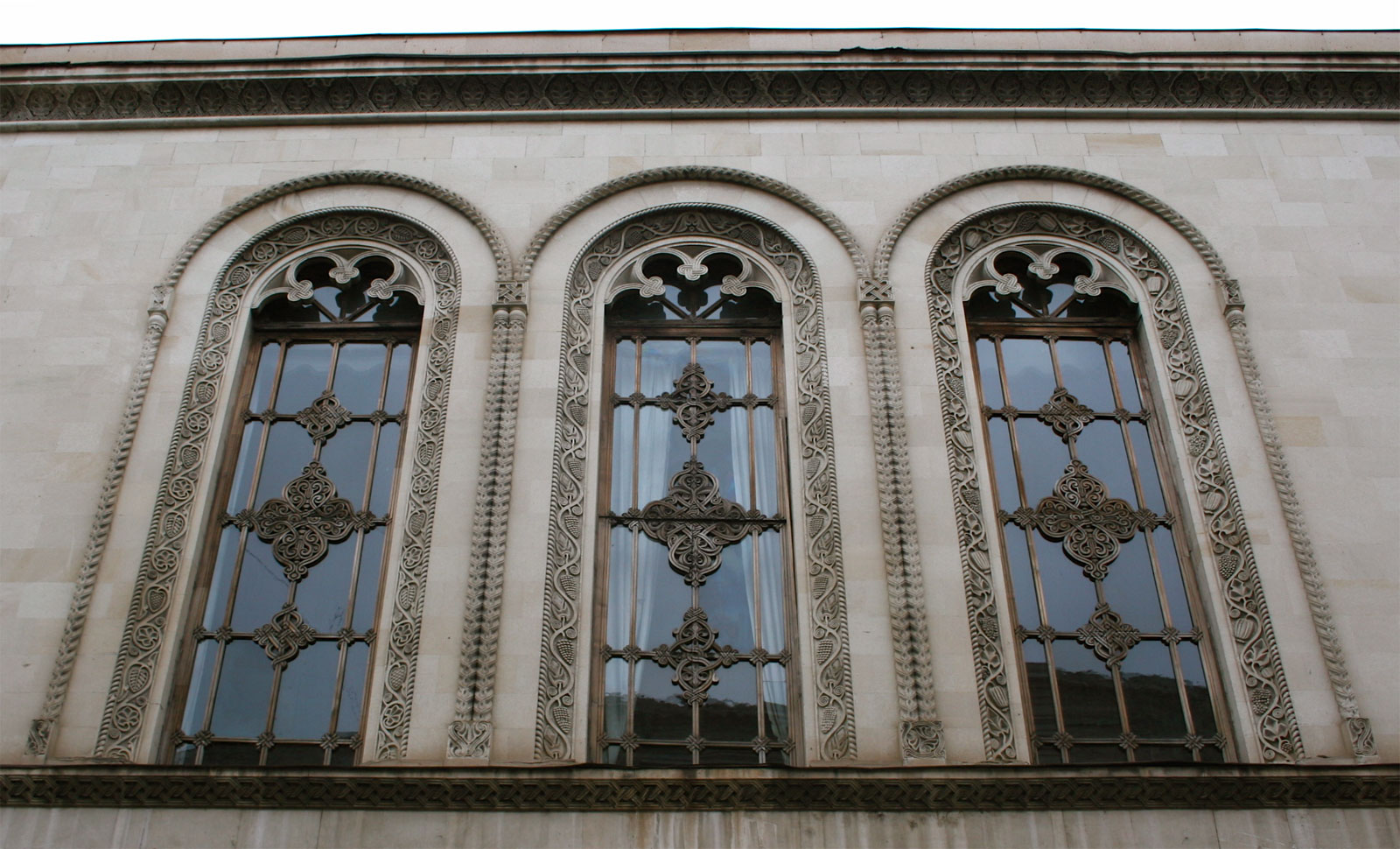
National Library of Georgia

The history of National Library of Georgia begins from 1846 when "Tiflis Public Library” was founded on the base of the Office of the Governor General of Tbilisi. By this, the desire of the Georgian society to have a library available for all levels of society was fulfilled. In 1848 the Public Library received the funds of "Private Associated Library” established on the initiative of the prominent public figure Dimitri Kipiani.

By 1859 the fund of the Public Library had consisted of 13.260 volumes in 19 languages. As the funds grew, the building of the Office could not meet the requirements any more, and in 1851 the new building was built. In 1852 the Library was granted the right to receive two free copies of all publications printed in Caucasus. In 1868 Tiflis Public Library and the Caucasus Museum were united, and in 1913 Tiflis Public Library was transformed into the Scientific Library of the Caucasus Museum and was completely united with the latter.

In 1914 the library was closed due to constructing a new building for the Caucasus Museum. The funds of the library were packed in the boxes and kept in the basement for ten years. The National Library of Georgia building #1 was built as the Bank of Nobility in 1913-16 by architect Anatoly Kalgin and artist Henryk Hryniewski.

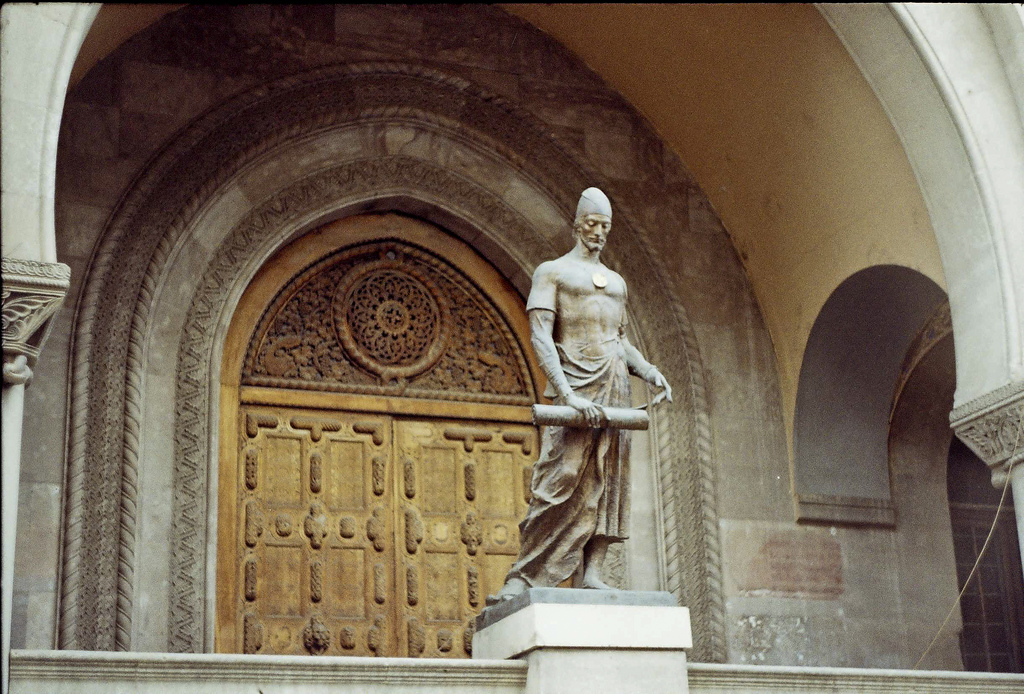
The statue of Shota Rustaveli at the entrance

On 30 May 1923, on the base of the Tiflis Public Library and Parliamentary Library, the State Public Library of Georgia was founded. In 1937 the library obtained the funds of the library of the Society for Dissemination of Literacy among Georgians, which was active in 1880–1927, that made it the most complete collection of the national printed materials. In 1957 the library joined international book exchange network. In 1989 the library purchased its first personal computer, and since 1990 the digital catalogues have been created.

From 1955 till 1990 the library was functioning under the name of "State Republic Library”; in 1990 it was granted the name "National Library of Georgia”. On 25 December 1996 it passed under control of Parliament of Georgia, and its official name was "National Parliamentary Library of Georgia” (NPLG). In 2000 it was named after Ilia Chavchavadze, the great Georgian literary and public figure, widely regarded as one of the founding fathers of modern Georgia. As of March 10, 2025, the National Library of Georgia has come under the purview of the Ministry of Culture of Georgia and has been formally designated as the "LEPL Ilia Chavchavadze National Library of Georgia".

Since 2006 the National Library of Georgia is a member of the International Federation of Library Associations and Institutions (IFLA).

In 2015 a video of a security guard named Omar Tsereteli playing the piano piece "Giorni dispari" by Ludovico Einaudi at the building gained international attention.

== See also ==
- List of libraries in Georgia (country)
