= National Science Library (India) =

Central government science library in India

- Founder: CSIR India
- Established: June 1963
- Head: Dr G Mahesh
- Location: Satsang Vihar Marg, New Delhi
- Website: nsl.niscair.res.in

National Science Library (Abbreviated as NSL) is India's central govt owned science library, archive and repository. In June 1963, CSIR desired to establish science library to receive and retain all scientific periodicals, reports of scientific work of nation both published and unpublished.

Initially it was established in the National Physical Laboratory (NPL) building, later shifted to JNU club building temporarily.

== Establishment ==
In 1983, permanently four-floored centrally air-conditioned NSL building was built up in 3.5-acre plot for library and others corollary purpose, products and services at Satsang Bihar Marg, New Delhi.

== Objective ==
Main goals and objectives are to accomplish various types of formal and informal instruction for promoting information literacy thorough out the country as well as Identify, acquire, organize, preserve, and provide access to pertinent recorded knowledge to researchers, scientists and all users engaged in research activities.

== Collection ==
The NSL archives over 2,51,000 printed collection of S&T documents including monographs, bound volumes of journals, reports, theses/dissertations, standards, and patents etc.

== See more ==
- CSIR India
