= National Science Library (Georgia) =

National library

National Scientific Library Georgian: ეროვნული სამეცნიერო ბიბლიოთეკა
- 41°42′57″N 44°46′58″E
- Location: Tbilisi, Georgia, Georgia
- Type: Public, library.
- Established: 1941 (85 years ago)
- Branches: 3

Collection
- Legal deposit: Yes

Other information
- Website: www.sciencelib.ge/en/

The National Scientific Library (Georgian: ეროვნული სამეცნიერო ბიბლიოთეკა) is a library in Tbilisi, Georgia. National Scientific Library is a biggest library in Georgia. Established in 1941, it initially served only the employees of the Georgian National Academy of Sciences. Presently library has three buildings: founded in 1941 former Central Library of Georgian Academy of Sciences, founded in 1965 Science and Technology Library and founded in 1961 Library-Museum of Ioseb Grishashvili.

== See also ==
- List of libraries in Georgia (country)
