= Ingiri =

Ingiri ინგირი Joghejiani (ჯოღეჯიანი)
- Interactive map of Ingiri
- Location within Georgia Location within Samegrelo-Zemo Svaneti
- Coordinates: 42°29′44″N 41°48′31″E
- Country: Georgia (country)
- Mkhare: Samegrelo-Zemo Svaneti
- Municipality: Zugdidi
- Elevation: 65 m (213 ft)

Population (2014)
  - Total: 4,049

National census
  - Georgians: 99.6%
- Time zone: UTC+4 (Georgian Time)

Ingiri (ინგირი) is a village in Zugdidi Municipality, Samegrelo-Zemo Svaneti, Georgia. The Oireme village belongs to the community. It is situated on Odishi-Guria plain, 4 km from the city of Zugdidi, 65 m above sea level. In the village there is a railway station on the Senaki–Zugdidi line. In the village there are kiwifruit plantations.

== Population ==
According to the 2014 census, 4,049 people live in the village.

Census year	Population	man	woman
2002	5 843	2 715	3 128
2014	▼4 049	1 945	2 104

== Name ==
Ingiri is a new name. In ancient times the village was named Joghejiani (ჯოღეჯიანი). Presumably the name "Ingiri" is from the Russian name of the Enguri River.

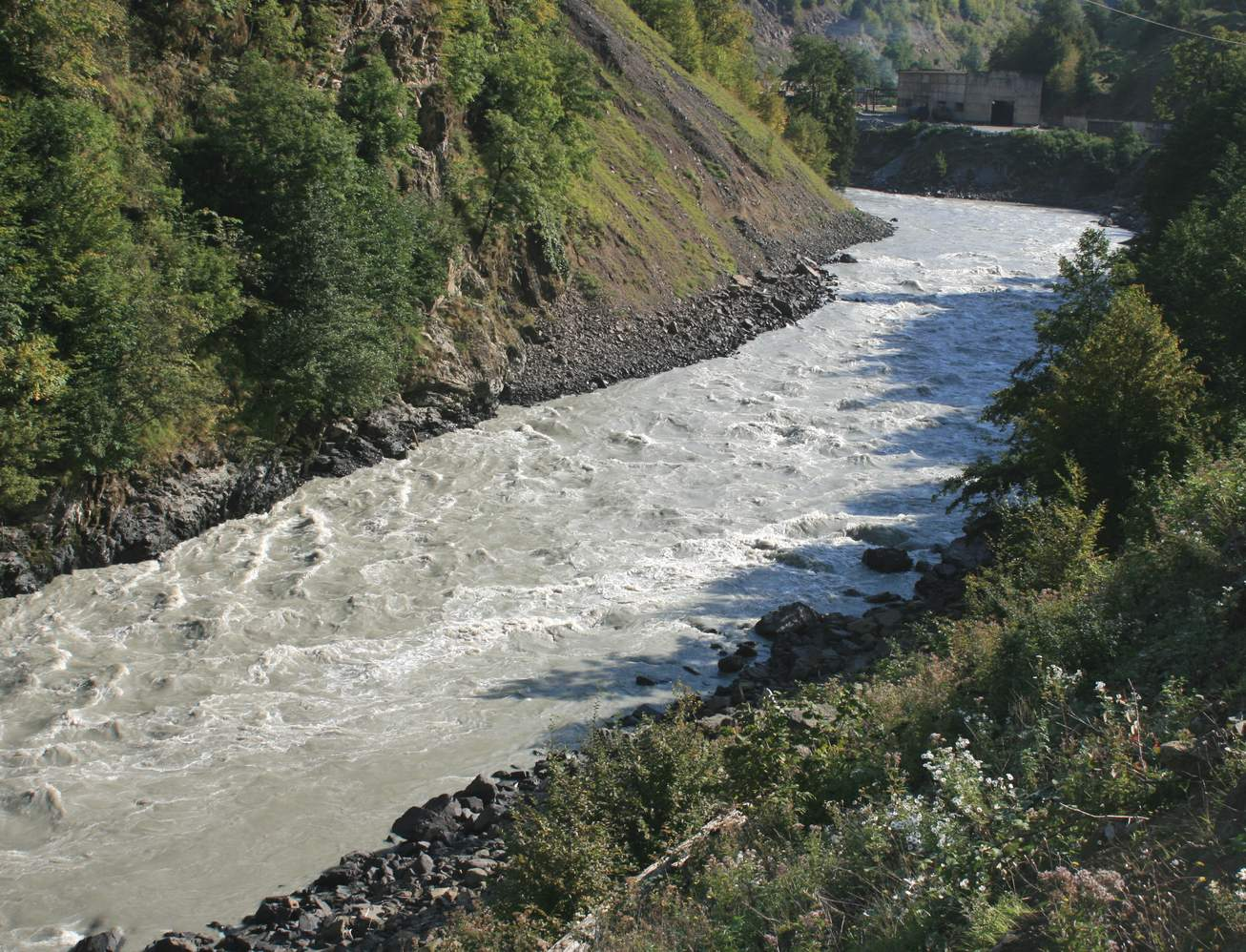
Enguri river flowing from the Jvari reservoir
