= National Science Library (Bangladesh) =

The National Science Library is a state owned and supported science library of Bangladesh.

== History ==
The National Science Library was established in 1981 under the Bangladesh National Scientific and Technical Documentation Centre. Its functions are to collect scientific publications and books.
