= Copyright law of Georgia =

The basic legal instrument governing copyright law in Georgia is the Law on Copyright and Neighboring Rights of June 22, 1999 (Georgian: საქართველოს კანონი საავტორო და მომიჯნავე უფლებების შესახებ) replacing Art. 488–528 of the Georgian Civil Code of 1964. While the old law had followed the Soviet Fundamentals of 1961, the new law is largely influenced by the copyright law of the European Union.

== Objects of copyright ==
According to Art. 5 para. 1 copyright applies to scientific, literary and artistic works, which are the result of intellectual-creative activities.

These works include (Art. 6 para. 1):

- literary works (books, brochures, articles, computer program, etc.)
- dramatic and dramatic-musical works, choreographic or pantomime works and other theatrical works
- musical works with or without text
- audiovisual works (cine-, tele-, videofilm, etc.; cf. Art. 15)
- sculptural, painting, graphic, lithographic, fine arts and similar works
- architectural works
- photographic works
- maps, plan sketches, etc.
- derivative works (in particular, translation, interlines of fiction, adaptation, making a screen version, review, staging, compilation, musical arrangement of literary and art works; cf. Art. 13)
- compilation works (in particular, collections like encyclopedias, anthologies, databases, provided that the selection and arrangement of the contents is the result of intellectual creative efforts; cf. Art. 12; publisher's right, Art. 14).

Excluded are (Art. 8):

- official documents (laws, decisions of courts, other texts of administrative and normative character), as well as their official translations;
- official symbols of state (flag, emblem, anthem, award, monetary symbols, other official signs and symbols of state);
- information of events and facts.

== Contents of copyright ==
Copyright comprises the personal moral rights of the author (Art. 17) as well as the economic rights of the author or other holder of copyright (Art. 18, 19). The economic rights of use include the rights on reproduction, distribution, importation, public display, public performance, public transmission, translation and remake (Art. 18 para. 2). In respect of fine art works there is a droit de suite (Art. 20 para. 2).

== Holder of copyright; transfer, license, administration ==
In general, original holder of copyright is the author; exception: works for hire (Art. 16). Registration with the Intellectual Property Center SAKPATENTI or compliance with any other formalities is not required (Art. 9 para. 2), but possible (paras. 3–4).

Upon death copyright is transferred by way of inheritance. The moral rights on authorship, name and inviolability are not transferred by succession, but the legatees have the right to exercise protection of the said rights (Art. 35 para. 3).

The permission on use of the work in a special way is given by copyright contract (Art. 40) granting an exclusive (Art. 37) or simple (Art. 38) license, Art. 36 para. 2.

The copyright holder may transfer his economic rights for administration to an organization administering economic rights on collective basis (Art. 64 para. 2).

== Duration of copyright ==
While certain moral rights are limitless in time (Art. 33), copyright in general is valid during the author's life and further 70 years from his death (p.m.a.; Art. 31, 32).

The person, who after expiration of copyright term, publishes first a work, which was not published earlier, enjoys economic rights (Art. 18 para. 8) during 25 years from the date of lawful publication (Art. 32 para. 6).

Yet after expiration of copyright term a fee may be charged for use of the work within the territory of Georgia (Art. 34 para 2).

== Limitation of economic rights ==
If copies of a work published lawfully are sold, then their further distribution without the author's consent is permitted (Art. 18 para. 4), except for the distribution of certain works by renting (para. 5). Other limitations of economic rights are defined by Art. 21–28, provided that such limitations do not prevent the normal use of the work and do not damage unreasonably the legal interests of the author or other holder of copyright (Art. 18 para. 9).

Permitted are

- reproduction by natural persons for personal purposes (Art. 21; royalty: para. 3)
- reproduction by libraries and archives for preservation purposes (Art. 22 subpara. a) or at the request of natural persons for educational, scientific or personal purposes (Art. 22 subpara. b)
- reproduction of separate articles, small works or small excerpts by educational institutions for teaching purposes (Art. 22 subpara. c)
- reproduction or communication to the public by limited quotation or alike (Art. 23)
- reproduction or communication to the public of works permanently disposed in places open to free attendance for non-commercial purposes (Art. 24)
- public performance of musical works at ceremonies (Art. 25)
- reproduction for court proceedings (Art. 26)
- short term recording by broadcasting organizations (Art. 27)
- certain uses of computer programs and databases (Art. 28–30).

== Neighboring rights ==
Neighboring rights comprise the rights of performers (Art. 47), phonogram producers (Art. 48), videogram producers (Art. 49) and broadcasting organizations (Art. 50); term: 50 years (Art. 57 paras. 1–4). Furthermore, the sui generis right of database producers (Art. 54) as common in European jurisdictions is granted; term: 15 years (Art. 57 para. 5) as from any substantial change (para. 6).

== Infringement ==
Infringement of copyright and neighboring rights results in civil liabilities like restoration of the state existing before the infringement, prevention of further infringing actions, reimbursement of the losses (including the neglected profit), confiscation of the income obtained by the infringer or payment of just compensation (Art. 59). Counterfeit copies may be confiscated and destroyed (Art. 60). For interim measures see Art. 61.

Deleting of the electronic information managing the right without the consent of the right's holder is deemed to be infringement (Art. 58 para. 3).
