= Zugdidi Municipality =

Coordinates: 42.5000°N 41.8500°E

- Municipality
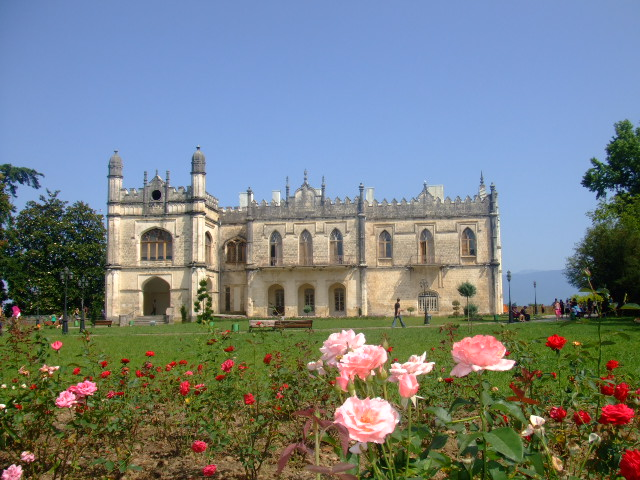
- Dadiani Palace

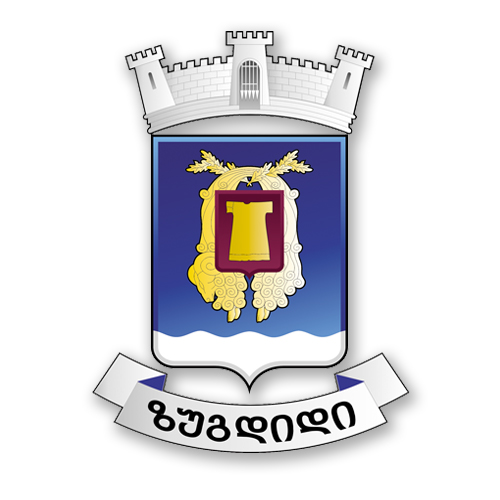
- Flag Seal

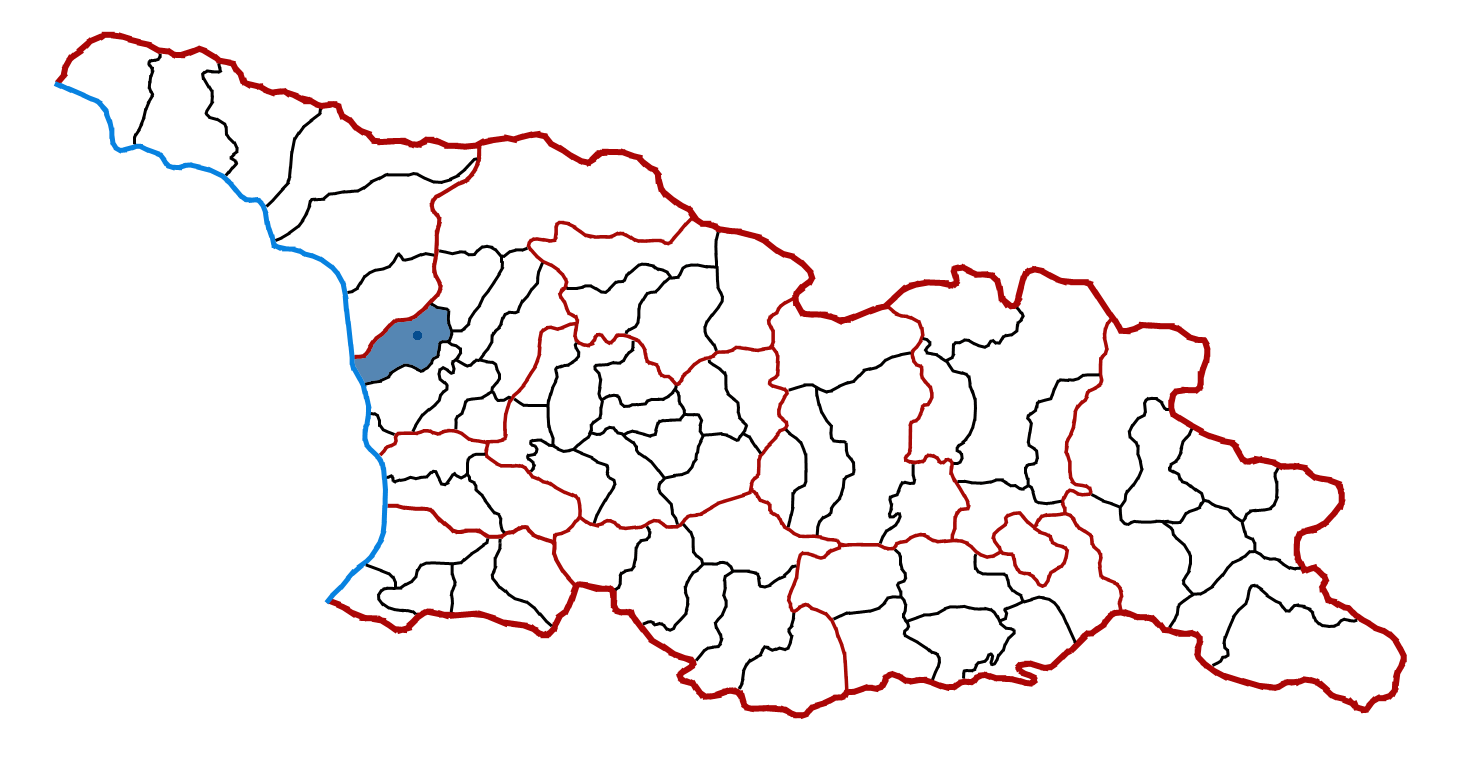
- Location of the municipality within Georgia
- Country: Georgia
- Region: Samegrelo-Zemo Svaneti
- Administrative centre: Zugdidi

Government
  - Body: Zugdidi Municipal Assembly
  - Mayor: Mamuka Tsotseria (GD)

Area
  - Total: 692 km^{2} (267 sq mi)

Population (2021)
  - Total: 99,542
  - Density: 143.8/km^{2} (372/sq mi)

Population by ethnicity
  - Georgians: 99.6%
  - Russians: 0.2%
- Time zone: UTC+4 (Georgian Standard Time)
- Website: http://zugdidi.mun.gov.ge/ge

Zugdidi (Georgian: ზუგდიდის მუნიციპალიტეტი) is a Municipality of Georgia, in the region of Samegrelo-Zemo Svaneti. Zugdidi Municipality is located in the central part of western Georgia, and has an area of 692 square kilometres (267 sq mi). Its western border follows the Black Sea coast (Ganmukhuri, Anaklia), the administrative strip of Abkhazia (Gali district) in the northwest, Tsalenjikha Municipality in the north and northeast, and it borders Chkhorotsqu Municipality and Khobi Municipality to the south. Zugdidi is the administrative center of both Zugdidi Municipality and Samegrelo Zemo-Svaneti region. Between 2014 and 2017 the city of Zugdidi was separated from the municipality and was a so-called "self-governed" city (or kalaki), but this administrative and governance reform was deemed too inefficient and expensive.

== History ==
=== Ancient history ===
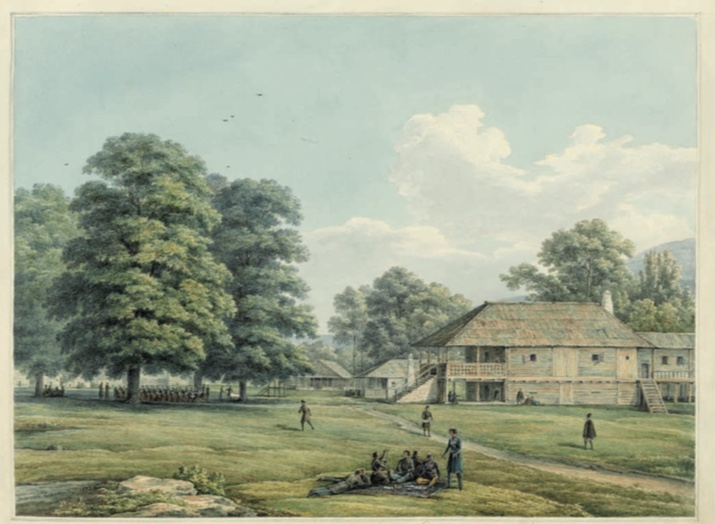
Nikanor Chernetsov, “House of Prince Dadian in Mingrelia”, 1833

The territory of Zugdidi municipality, due to its economic-geographical location, seems to have been inhabited since ancient times. Archaeological sites confirm that coastal wetlands originated in the recent geological past. It can be seen that during the flourishing of the Colchis culture in the fourth-third millennia of the old year the wetlands were significantly less.

During the Hellenistic period, an important trade route passed through the territory of modern Zugdidi municipality from Svaneti, on the river. Along the Enguri stream, in the direction of the Black Sea and from there, trade goods were transported to the Hellenic world (direct evidence of the development of this trade route must be the ancient necropolis of the village Riki, with the tombs of socially advanced members), which is confirmed by numismatic materials.

Zugdidi was an important city of ancient Georgia. Its etymology has been touched upon by many scholars, most of them suggest that Zugdidi // Zurgdidi // Zugdidi means a big hill in Megrelian. This was the name of the hill, which was later called Mantskhvarkarish Sukia (Hill of the Savior's Gate), after which the city built here took its name.

=== Middle Ages up to early modern period ===
In written sources, Zugdidi is first mentioned by the narrator Beri Egnatashvili in 1572 in connection with the battle between Guria, the chief uncle of Guria, and George III, the chief of Principality of Mingrelia. In the first half of the 17th century, the chief of Samegrelo, Levan II Dadiani, made Zugdidi his capital city. During the reign of Levan II Dadiani (1634-1657), the Odisha principality was the strongest among the kingdoms of western Georgia. Zugdidi, as the capital of this principality, has become a very important city.

In order to develop trade in Zugdidi, in 1636 Levan II Dadiani deported the Chkhareli Armenian and Jewish merchants who had been taken to the ransom of King George Imereti. "We built the city of Chkhari, settled in Zugdidi and settled in Rukhi." Gray was considered a part of Zugdidi, so the construction of Gray Fortress should have started at this time, the main purpose of which was to protect the city.

After the death of Levan II Dadiani (1657), the merchants who moved to Zugdidi were returned by King Alexander of Imereti to Chkhari, which significantly undermined the commercial profitability of Zugdidi. Moreover, the second half of the 17th century and the first quarter of the 18th century turned western Georgia into an arena of incessant civil feudal wars and Ottoman Empire raids, and Zugdidi itself was plundered many times.

In 1662, King Vakhtang V (r. 1658–1676), enraged by Vameq III Dadiani, invaded Samegrelo and took Rukhi Fortress. This further weakened the princely state of Odisha. In the 1670s, the attacks of Abkhazians on Samegrelo and especially on Zugdidi became more frequent, their Marbelian detachments razed everything to the ground, looted temples, and completely destroyed Chirnakhuli. Similarly, from the end of the 17th century until the whole of the 18th century, Zugdidi and its environs were the victims of permanent raids by the Turks, during which the "purchase of captives" reached unprecedented proportions.

At the end of 1779, a joint army of Abkhazians and Turks under the command of Zurab Shervashidze invaded Samegrelo. The second man of Samegrelo, II Dadiani, asked King Solomon of Imereti for help. The troops of all the flags of Imereti gathered in Bandza and the army was led by King Solomon himself. The enemy army, where there were 12,000 warriors divided into three divisions, crossed the river. Enguri and includes the united army of Imereti and Megrelians. The decisive battle took place near the Gray Fortress, in the Saralobegi Valley. The enemy army was severely defeated and western Georgia escaped another devastating invasion, the angry population of Mount Urta returned to their homes. This was the last expedition of the Abkhaz feudal lords against their ruler - the prince of Samegrelo.

== Geography and climate ==
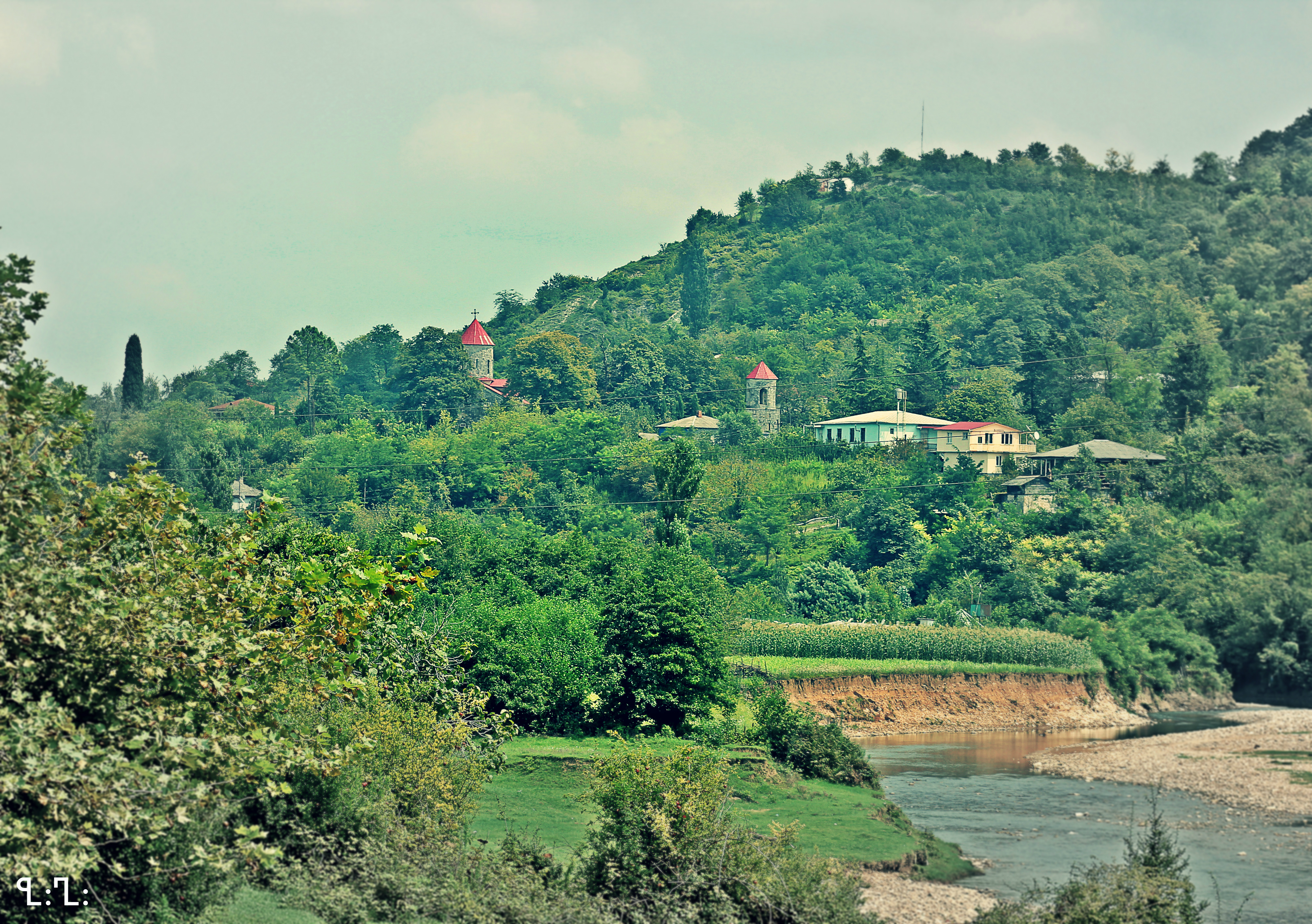
Tsaishi Cathedral

According to the scheme of tectonic zones, the territory of Zugdidi Municipality is included in the Kolkheti subzone of the western subsidence zone of the Georgian Belt. According to the geomorphological features, it consists of three parts: 1. Accumulated Odisha lowland with flat surface (west and south-western part of the municipality up to the Black Sea), 2. Sloping Vake-Odisha plateau (east and north-east part of the municipality and flooded rivers and With a network of gorges), 3. Foothills and Urta mountain (on the border of Khobi municipality, height 469 m.), the northern slope of which is located in the territory of Zugdidi municipality.

The whole territory of Zugdidi Municipality is located in the humid subtropical climate of the sea, the plain and hilly strip are characterized by humid warm climate, snowless winters and hot summers. The proximity of the Black Sea has a great influence on the nature of the climate. High radiation balance leads to a high thermal regime. The average perennial air temperature near the land surface is over 14 degrees. The coldest month is January, the temperature is positive in the plain part and at this time it is 6-7 degrees on average, while in the upper part it is negative. The warmest months are July and August, with average monthly temperatures exceeding 22 degrees. The average absolute maximum air temperature is 34-36 degrees in the Black Sea coast, up to 38 degrees in the plains. The humid air masses rising from the sea cause high air humidity throughout the year. The partial pressure of water vapor is high in the Black Sea zone.

The territory of Zugdidi municipality is characterized by high cloudiness and heavy rainfall, the total cloudiness varies in the range of 60-70% during the year, and the cloudiness of the lower tier reaches 40-35%. The maximum of cloudiness in the annual course is observed in late winter and early spring, and the minimum in autumn. Annual precipitation varies between 1400 and 3000 mm. Uneven terrestrial heating, the presence of mountainous terrain and the proximity of the relatively warm Black Sea lead to the formation of winds of different directions and strengths. East winds prevail in the cold season of the year, while west (sea) winds prevail in the warm season. The number of foggy days varies from 10 to 50, with an average of 30-40 thunderstorm days.

Agro-climatic conditions are very favorable for the creation of multidisciplinary and highly profitable agricultural production, especially for the development of such fields as mesimindeoba, mechaieoba, production of subtropical crops (citrus, laurel, kiwi, feijoa, etc.), fruit and berry production. Many of the water bodies in the territory of Zugdidi Municipality are rivers, swamps and springs, which have played an important role in the economic and traffic relations of the local population since time immemorial. Of the great rivers, the Enguri and the Jumi are distinguished.

The territory of Zugdidi Municipality, as part of the Kolkheti Botanical Province, includes the lowland and foothill forest areas, while the Silnar-sandy vegetation area of the Black Sea coast belongs to the Euclidean part of the Mediterranean region. The main types of vegetation in the lowland and foothill forest areas are forests, water and swamp vegetation. Most of the forest vegetation is represented by secondary types - deciduous forests and shrubs, the main forest formations in the lowlands and foothills - alder, oak, brush-oak and brush-wood, hornbeam, chestnut and wood.

== Politics ==
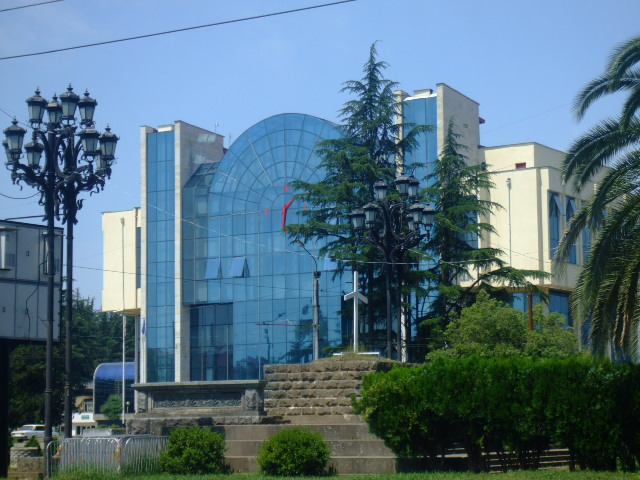
Zugdidi City hall

Zugdidi Municipal Assembly (Georgian: ზუგდიდის საკრებულო, Zugdidi Sakrebulo) is a representative body in Zugdidi Municipality, consisting of 45 members which are elected every four years. The last election was held in October 2021. Mamuka Tsotseria of Georgian Dream (GD) was elected mayor after a hotly contested second round against a candidate of United national Movement (UNM).

Zugdidi was one of only seven municipalities where the ruling GD party failed to secure a majority in the city council. The opposition party UNM became the largest party in Zugdidi, but was one seat short of an absolute majority, after a recount. This led to protests later in the month, and a tense atmosphere around the second round of the mayoral election and afterwards. After several attempts, the opposition parties UNM and For Georgia agreed to a chairman of the Sakrebulo, four months after the elections. Georgian Dream boycotted the vote.

Party	2017	2021	Current Municipal Assembly
Georgian Dream	43	18	
Ahali		14 (Note: Split from UNM.)	
United National Movement	5	8	
For Georgia		3	
People's Power		2 (Note: Split from GD.)	
European Georgia	2		
Total	50	45	

== Subdivisions of Zugdidi ==
Administrative Units of Zugdidi

As of 2024 Population census the municipality consists of 49 administrative unit (temi) with one city, Zugdidi.

The city of Zugdidi was separated in 2014 from the municipality and was a so-called "self-governed" city (or kalaki). This administrative and governance reform was deemed too inefficient and expensive and was thus revoked in 2017. Since then, the city of Zugdidi has been part of the general municipality again.

Among the 58 villages in Zugdidi Municipality are:

Ranking	Settlement / administrative unit	Population
1	Zugdidi	46,955
2	Ingiri	3,800
3	Kakhati	3,567
4	Chitatsqari	2,986
5	Darcheli	2,460
6	Rukhi	2,302
7	Narazeni	2,163
8	Akhalabastumani	1,885
9	Orsantia	1,794
10	Tsaishi	1,608
11	Jikhaskari	1,523
12	Rike	1,461
13	Zeda Etseri	1,426
14	Shamgona	1,410
15	Odishi	1,300
16	Anaklia	1,269
17	Chkaduashi	1,240
18	Jumi	1,147
19	Akhalkakhati	1,129
20	Natsuluku	1,128
21	Qulishkari	1,111
22	Chakvinji	1,107
23	Ganarjiis Mukhuri	1,075
24	Koki	1,045
25	Oktomberi	1,036
26	Orulu	1,016
27	Akhalsopeli	925
28	Chkhoria	795
29	Chkhoushi	779
30	Tsatskhvi	737
31	Kortskheli	714
32	Kirovi	711
33	Didinedzi	688
34	Urta	684
35	Oireme	621
36	Tkaia	604
37	Uchashona	532
38	Khetsera	530
39	Natsatu	517
40	Abastumani	510
41	Ergeta	497
42	Alertkari	478
43	Davitiani	467
44	Bashi	425
45	Tsvane	421
46	Shamadela	331
47	Didinedzis Kakhati	300
48	Opachkhapu	257
49	Khurcha	240

== Population ==
By the start of 2021 the population was determined at 99,542 people, a decline of 6% compared to the 2014 census. (Note: Combined figures of the 2014-2017 city municipality (kalaki) Zugdidi and the municipality of Zugdidi.) The city of Zugdidi lost 3% of its population in this period, and los its position of 6th largest city in Georgia to Poti. The population density of the municipality is 143.8 inhabitants per square kilometre (372/sq mi).

The population consists for 99.6% of Georgians, mainly Mingrelians. There are a few hundred Russians (0.2%) and smaller numbers of ethnic minorities such as Ukrainians, Bosha, Armenians, Assyrians, Abkhazians, Ossetians and Greeks. The vast majority of the population is Orthodox Christian (98%), while the only other religious minorities detected through the census are roughly 350 Jehovah's Witnesses who predominantly live in the city of Zugdidi, and a few dozen Muslims.

Population Zugdidi Municipality
	1897	1922	1926	1939	1959	1970	1979	1989	2002	2014	2021
Zugdidi Municipality	-	-	-	74,246	▲96,643	▲112,241	▲120,217	▲125,444	▲167,760	▼105,509	▼99,542
Zugdidi city	3,407	▲4,525	▲5,577	▲15,062	▲31,081	▲39,896	▲45,170	▲50,022	▼68,894	▼42,998	▼41,456
Data: Population statistics Georgia 1897 to present. Note: (Note: The 2014 census found an inexplicable gap with the data from the national statistical office Geostat. UN-assisted research has found the 2002 census was inflated by about 8-9 percent. See, "1. Introduction", Page 1.)

The historic Zugdidi Uyezd, that existed until 1930 and contained the modern municipalities Tsalenjikha, Chkhorotsku and the majority of Khobi, had a population of 114,869 in 1897.

== Historical sites ==
- Dadiani Palace
- Chakvinji fortress
- Tsaishi cathedral
- Kolkheti National Park
- Zugdidi Botanical Garden
- Rukhi Fortress
- Anaklia Fortress
- Church of St. George in Tkaia

== Gallery ==
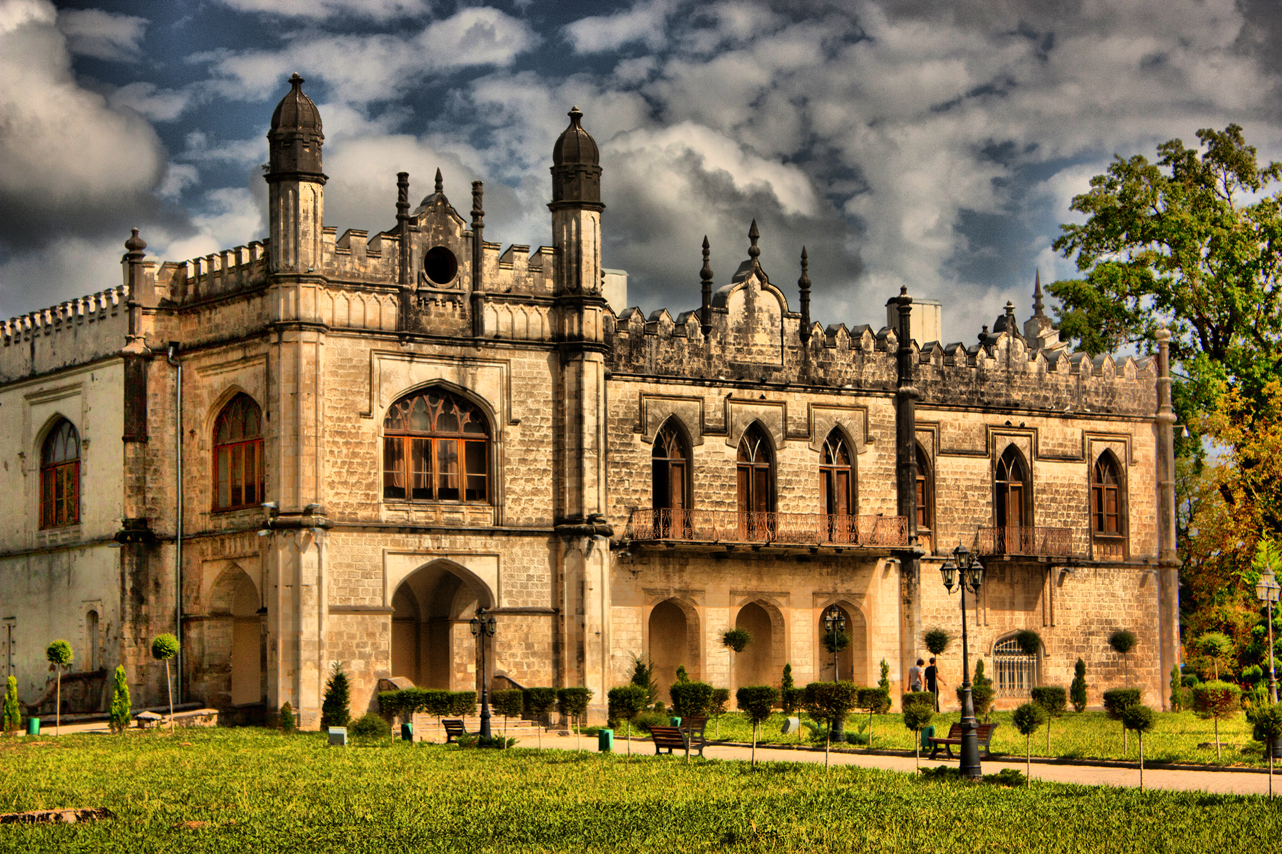
Dadiani Palace

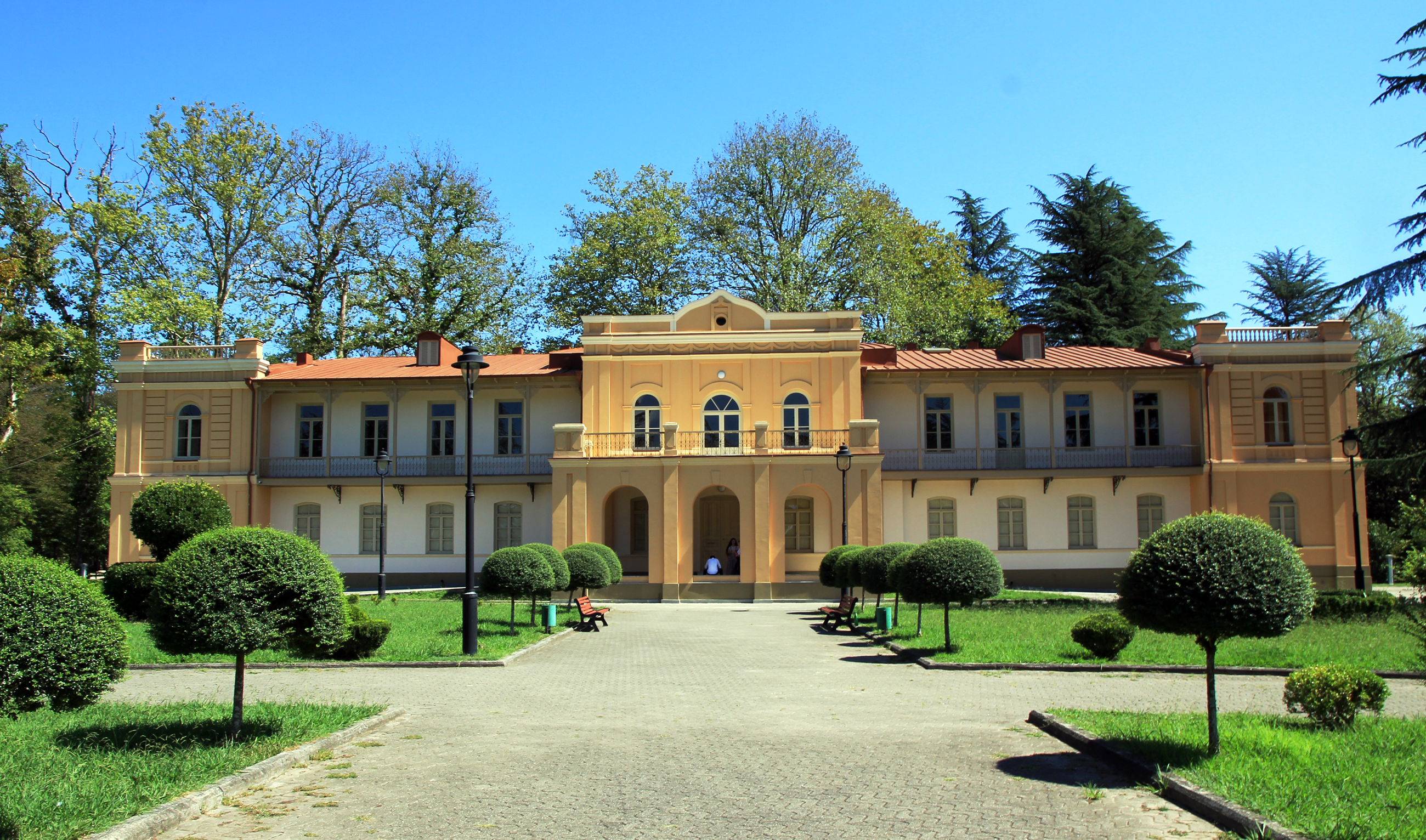
Dadiani Summer Palace

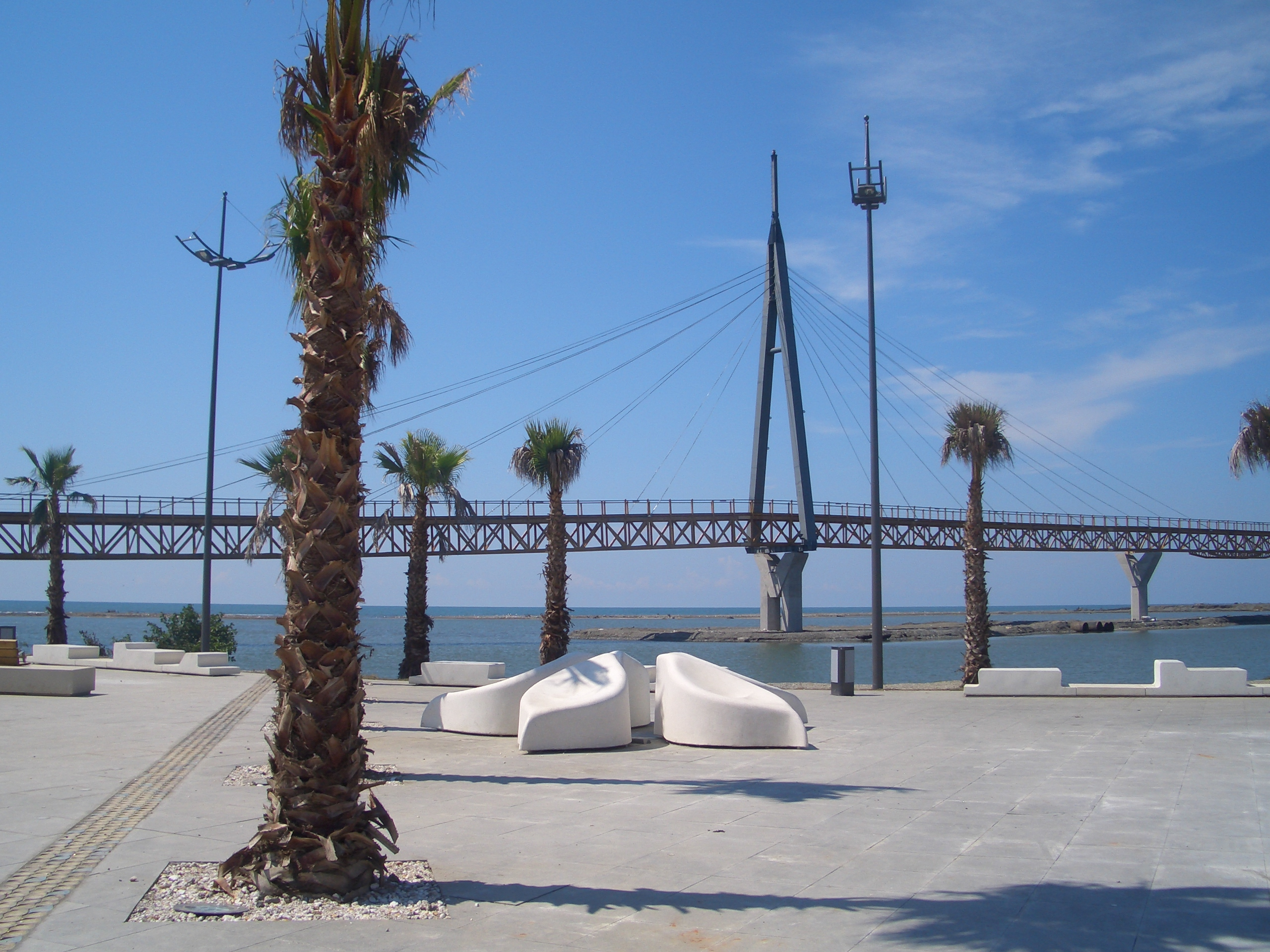
Anaklia

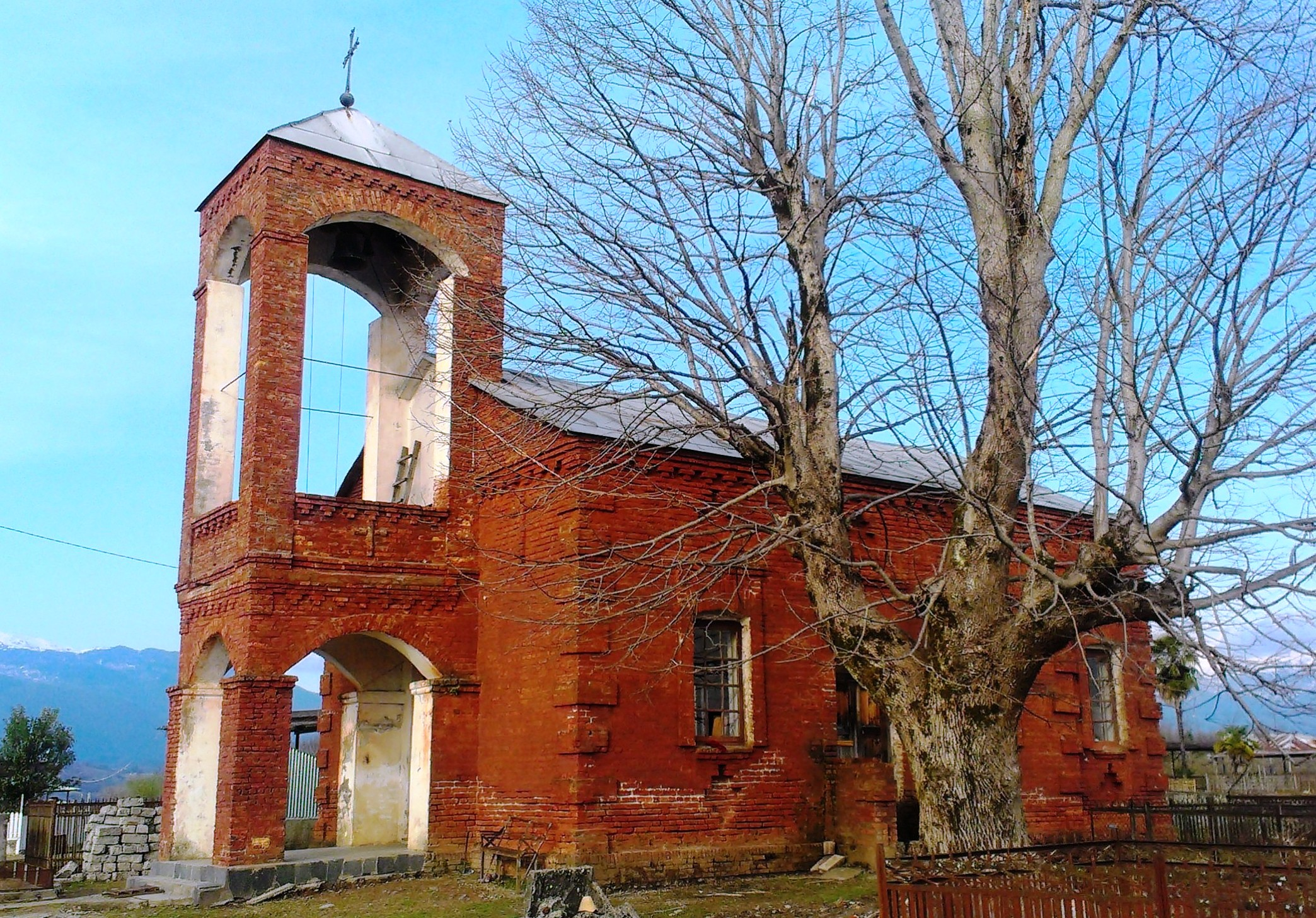
Tkaia church

Kortskheli Virgin Church

== See also ==
- List of municipalities in Georgia (country)
