= Battle of Samtredia =

1993 battle of Georgian Civil War

- Part of Georgian Civil War
Date	17 – 22 October 1993
Location	Samtredia, Georgia
Result	Shevardnadze government victory

Belligerents
(Georgia (country)) Shevardnadze government Mkhedrioni; Russia: 35th Military Corps	(Georgia (country)) Gamsakhurdia government

Commanders and leaders
(Georgia (country)) Eduard Shevardnadze (Russia) Boris Yeltsin	(Georgia (country)) Zviad Gamsakhurdia (Georgia (country)) Loti Kobalia

Strength
Unknown number of soldiers Unknown number of T-55 tanks 5 computerized T-72 tanks 14 APCs with cannons	Unknown number of soldiers Unknown number of T-55 tanks

Casualties and losses
40 dead (17 October)	Unknown

The Battle of Samtredia was fought in Samtredia during the Georgian Civil War in October 1993 between supporters of ousted President Zviad Gamsakhurdia and post-coup government of Eduard Shevardnadze.

== Background ==
=== 1991–1992 Georgian coup d'état ===
In May 1991, Zviad Gamsakhurdia was elected as the first President of Georgia. However, in August 1991, the National Guard of Georgia split into pro- and anti-Gamsakhurdia factions after its commander Tengiz Kitovani declared disobedience to Gamsakhurdia. This conflict eventually led to the rebel factions of the National Guard, aided by a group of paramilitary organizations, staging a coup in capital Tbilisi against President Gamsakhurdia. This struggle, known as the Tbilisi War, would eventually lead to the president fleeing the country in early 1992 and a new government, the Military Council, taking over. This council was replaced by the State Council led by the new leader Eduard Shevardnadze two months later.

Gamsakhurdia and his allies opted to set up government-in-exile in Chechnya. In Georgia, pro-Gamsakhurdia factions of the Georgian National Guard took control of Mingrelia, Gamsakhurdia's home region and political stronghold. In September 1993, Gamsakhurdia returned to Georgia, and his troops advanced from their political stronghold in October, launching an offensive against the post-coup government of Eduard Shevardnadze with the goal of reclaiming capital Tbilisi and whole country. During the offensive, Gamsakhurdia's forces seized nine towns in Western Georgia, including the important Black Sea port of Poti.

== Battle ==
=== Offensive ===
On 17 October, at dawn, Gamsakhurdia's troops crossed the Tskhenistsqali river and launched their offensive on Samtredia backed with tanks and artillery. The resistance soon crumbled and they reached the city center within hours. While most of Shevardnadze's troops retreated to Kutaisi, some were surrounded by Gamsakhurdia's troops. With the capture of Samtredia, Gamsakhurdia loyalists gained control over an important logistical hub and a railway junction connecting Tbilisi to Batumi, thus putting Shevardnadze's government in a vulnerable position. According to Shevardnadze government spokesman Zaza Bilikhodze, 40 Shevardnadze's troops died in a battle, while there was no information on a number of casualties on Gamsakhurdia's side.

=== Russian intervention ===
Shevardnadze responded to the defeat by arriving to Kutaisi and preparing for its defence and counteroffensive. On 18 October, Shevardnadze admitted that his army has virtually disintegrated and appealed to Russia for help to halt Gamsakhurdia's advance. By this time, Gamsakhurdia's forces controlled one-third of the country and advanced towards Kutaisi, second largest city in Georgia. On 22 October, Shevardnadze signed a decree on joining the Commonwealth of Independent States as the Parliament of Georgia was in the state of a self-imposed temporary suspension amid state of emergency requested by Shevardnadze in September 1993. Still, 127 Georgian lawmakers signed an informal letter supporting Georgia's entry into CIS. Russian troops moved out from their military base in Georgia under the pretext of protecting vital road and rail links. Russia provided heavy weapons for the Georgian army and a military training to counter Gamsakhurdia's troops. These included professional tank crews, composed of Russians, Ukrainians and other non-Georgians, which led or participated in the important assaults as the Shevardnadze's troops launched their counteroffensive. However, Russia denied that its troops participated in the fighting, although it was confirmed by Shevardnadze's Interior Ministry officers.

=== Counteroffensive ===
On 22 October, Shevardnadze's troops attacked Samtredia with the support of Russian tanks and the street fights followed. Later that day, Shevardnadze's Defence Ministry reported recapturing Samtredia. Shevardnadze's troops further advanced to the west across a river that had been a frontline and threatened to attack Senaki, a major military center under control of Gamsakhurdia.

Komsomolskaya Pravda described the battle for Samtredia in such way: "The fate of the battle was pre-decided: On each rebel came 20 troops from the regular army. Zviadists shoot from roadside ditches, open fire from orchards, throw grenades from windows. On the streets among blood and scattered iron boxes of ammunition lie dead rebels – one, two, three... The bullet-ridden bus of Zviad Gamsakhurdia's security is on fire – during the five days of rebel control, the bus came here four times".

== See also ==
- Georgian Civil War
- 1991–1992 Georgian coup d'état
