= 1998 Georgian attempted mutiny =

Army mutiny in Georgia

Date	18–19 October 1998
Location	Georgia
Result	Government victory

Belligerents
Georgian Government; Georgian Army; Georgian Police	Mutineers from the Senaki Military Brigade; Zviadists

Commanders and leaders
President Eduard Shevardnadze; Defence Minister Davit Tevzadze	Colonel Akaki Eliava

Strength
Unknown	200 mutineers 50 villagers

Casualties and losses
1 killed	4 killed 31 arrested 1 tank destroyed

The Georgian Armed Forces mutiny of October 1998 was an abortive attempt of a rebellion organized by a group of officers led by Colonel Akaki Eliava in western Georgia against the government of President Eduard Shevardnadze.

The mutiny had its roots in the Georgian civil war of 1991–1993. Akaki Eliava, a leader of the revolt, was among the most active supporters of the late president Zviad Gamsakhurdia, who was ousted in a coup in 1992 and defeated in a subsequent attempt to regain power in 1993. Eliava was arrested, but later granted amnesty and he rejoined Georgia's armed forces.

On October 18, 1998, approximately 200 Georgian soldiers led by Eliava left their barracks at the town of Senaki in western Georgia and marched on Kutaisi, the second largest city in the country. The government forces under the personal command of Defense Minister David Tevzadze intercepted the rebels before reaching the city. Next day, after a brief shootout which left at least one soldier and four rebels dead, the mutineers agreed to return to their barracks. 31 rebels were arrested, but Colonel Eliava and his 30 followers escaped.

== Background ==
Zviad Gamsakhurdia became the first democratically elected president of Georgia in May 1991. Though his presidency came to an abrupt end in January 1992, after an armed conflict erupted in Tbilisi, the capital city of Georgia. As a result of a 2 week long clashes between the government forces and the rebels, Gamsakhurdia was ousted and forced to leave the country, as Tengiz Kitovani and Tengiz Sigua, the main leaders of the rebel factions, invited the former first secretary of the Georgian Communist Party, and the former Soviet minister of foreign affairs, Eduard Shevardnadze, to become the chairman of the Georgian parliament, de facto ruling as the new president, As the impoverished former Soviet republic plunged into a brutal civil war, Gamsakhurdia saw this as an opportunity to come back to power, returning to Georgia in September 1993 and beginning warfare in the Samegrelo region. Gamsakhurdia and his supporters, the Zviadists, had noticeable success, capturing the capital city of the region, Zugdidi, along with other towns such as Khobi, Senaki and Samtredia, even going as far as reaching the outskirts of Kutaisi, the second-largest city of the country, as they took advantage of the new government being unpopular in the rural areas of western Georgia, as well as the government forces being demoralized after the loss of the Abkhazia region. Though the Zviadists were soon stopped by them, with the help of the Russian military, as they entered Zugdidi without fighting on November 6, 1993. Zviad Gamsakhurdia and his bodyguards escaped to the forests chased by the government forces. The ex-president died in late December under unclear circumstances. After his death, Zviadists never created a single party, but rather joined various political organizations or the military. One of such Zviadists was Akaki Eliava, the future leader of the mutiny, who was arrested after the war, but was later granted amnesty and joined the reconstructed armed forces of Georgia, becoming a Colonel.

Even though the new government restored peace in the country, the political and economical instability continued, as many factors, such as widespread corruption, would halt the recovery of the country from the effects of the civil war, as well as severely damage Shevardnadze's reputation, who survived an assassination attempt in August 1995, for which he blamed and imprisoned Jaba Ioseliani, the leader of the paramilitary organisation Mkhedrioni, which played a vital role in the civil war. Shevardnadze would later survive another assassination attempt in February 1998, which left two of his bodyguards and one of the attackers dead. Shevardnadze blamed Zviadists for the attack.

== Timeline of events ==
On the night of October 19, 1998, Colonel Akaki Eliava and a group of officers began a riot in Senaki. With the help of a military brigade of the ministry of defense of Georgia, they managed to capture the minister of security Jemal Gakhokidze and a regional representative. The rebels seized tanks and armoured vehicles, and blocked several key roads in the area, heading to Kutaisi, capturing which would open the way for the capital city of Tbilisi. The government forces were deployed in the region in order to stop the rebels, but were forced to retreat, as the mutineers captured a small village of Gubi, located only 6 miles (9.7 km) away from Kutaisi, while they were joined by 50 villagers. Shevardnadze later addressed the attack on national television, stating that "It would be unjustified irresponsibility on the part of Georgia's President and the Defense Minister if we allowed that heavy machinery and vehicles with armed adventurers into Georgia's second-largest city." The security was tightened near the key buildings in Tbilisi, as the government forces under the personal command of Defense Minister David Tevzadze managed to intercept the rebels. A shootout broke out, leaving one government soldier dead and two injured. Four mutineers were killed when their tank was destroyed. After the talks with the government forces, they agreed to release hostages and return to their barracks, subsequently giving up control of the village they managed to capture.

At the barracks where the mutiny began, a soldier said the mutineers were mainly conscripts who were ordered by commanders to set off early on Monday morning without knowing why. He stated, that his crew didn't join the rebels, because their tank wouldn't start. The mutiny became a subject of speculations, stating that it was an attempt of outside forces to have the route of a pipeline (possibly the Baku-Tbilisi-Ceyhan pipeline) carrying oil from the Caspian Sea to the western market diverted. This claim was backed by the president of Georgia and the government officials as well. "We have been doing everything possible to solve problems with construction of the oil pipeline for five or six years, and they are trying to interfere with that," Shevardnadze said.

== Aftermath ==
After the mutiny, the rebels were arrested and charged with treason. However, their leader, Akaki Eliava, along with some of his supporters, managed to escape and go into hiding in the woods of western Georgia. He was killed in July 2000 near Zestaponi, during a shootout with the police. His murder was broadcast on national television, which became a subject of controversy.

Eduard Shevardnadze won the 2000 Presidential elections, receiving 82% of the vote. It became a subject of controversy though, as the elections were declared rigged. His party, the Union of Citizens of Georgia went on to lose the 2002 local elections. For the 2003 parliamentary elections, it united with the National-Democratic, the Socialist and other parties into a new bloc called "For a New Georgia". It was declared as the winner, receiving 22.10% of the vote, with the pro-Shevardnadze party, the Democratic Union for Revival, led by the leader of the Adjarian Autonomous Republic, Aslan Abashidze, taking the second place. The elections were deemed rigged, which sparked a new wave of protests, escalating into the Rose Revolution, which resulted into Shevardnadze resigning on November 23, 2003. He was replaced by Mikheil Saakashvili, who won the 2004 Presidential elections by a landslide, receiving 96.94% of the vote. He would later also have to face a mutiny in 2009.
