= Koba Kobaladze =

Georgian major-general

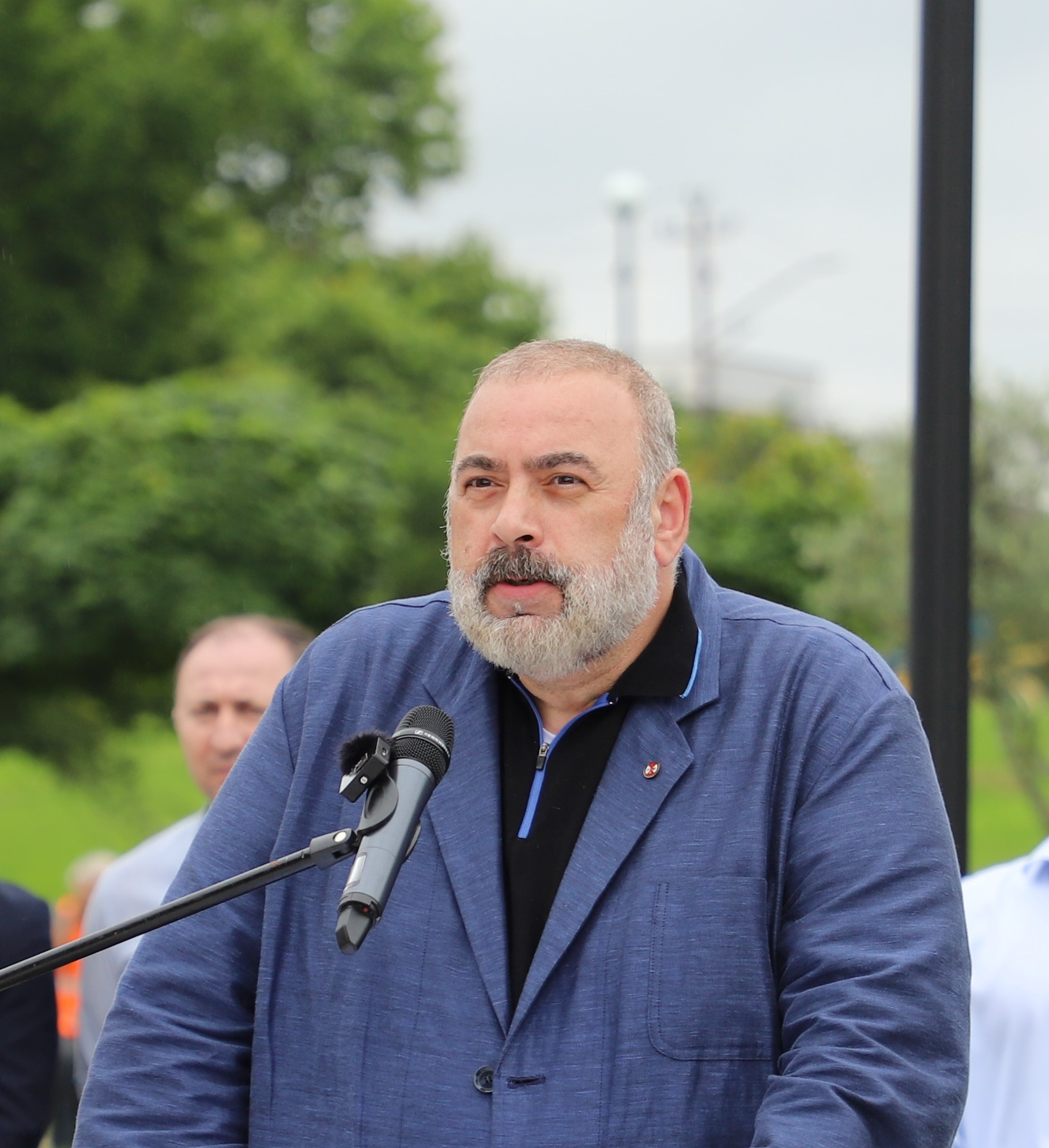
- Military career
- Allegiance: Georgia; Soviet Union
- Branch: Soviet Army; Georgian Army
- Rank: Major general
- Commands: Georgian National Guard
- Conflicts: Battle of Gagra

Koba Kobaladze (Georgian: კობა კობალაძე; born July 7, 1969) is a retired major-general of the Georgian army who served on top military posts early in the 2000s. On May 5, 2009, he was arrested by the Georgian Police on charges of plotting an army mutiny.

== Military career ==
Born in Tbilisi, then-Soviet Georgia, Kobaladze served in the Soviet military from 1987 to 1989. In 1991 he volunteered in the National Guard of Georgia, with which he took part in the conflicts in post-Soviet Georgia. Kobaladze took an active part in the War in Abkhazia and was one of the senior commanders. During one of the battles he was severely wounded near Gagra. Kobaladze received nine bullets to the chest and survived but never managed to fully recover.

Kobaladze graduated from the Ryazan Guards Higher Airborne Command School in 1996 and Frunze Military Academy (Russia) in 1999. In 2000, Colonel Kobaladze was appointed commander of land forces of the Georgian Ministry of Defense. He was retrained at NATO centers in the United States, Germany, and Turkey from 2001 to 2003. In 2001, he was made a commander of the National Guard of Georgia, a post he resigned in 2004. In 2009, he was among the founders of the NGO Generals' Club.

== Arrest and trial ==
In May 2009, Kobaladze was arrested on charges of plotting the abortive mutiny in a Georgian tank battalion, which – the authorities suggested – was part of a Russian-backed coup plot. He was acquitted of this charge on 11 January 2010. The judge found Kobaladze guilty of illegally keeping a firearm and hand-grenades and sentenced him of eight months in prison. But as Kobaladze had already spent eight months in detention, he was immediately released from the courtroom. Kobaladze is the only Georgian to be awarded with all three ranks of Vakhtang Gorgasali Order.
