= Battle of Poti (1993) =

Battle of Poti, Georgian Civil War

- Part of Georgian Civil War
Date	2 October 1993 – 4 November 1993
Location	Poti, Georgia
Result	Russian victory

Belligerents
(Russia) Russian Naval Infantry Battalion	(Georgia (country)) Zviadists
- Black Sea Fleet

Commanders and leaders
(Russia) Boris Yeltsin (Georgia (country)) Eduard Shevardnadze (Russia) Gen. Vasily Belchenko †	(Georgia (country)) Loti Kobalia (Georgia (country)) Zviad Gamsakhurdia

Strength
9 vessels	Unknown

The Battle of Poti was a series of engagements around Poti, Georgia during the Georgian Civil War, between rebels supporting the ousted Georgian president Zviad Gamsakhurdia, the so-called 'Zviadists', and Russian forces supporting the Georgian Head of State Eduard Shevardnadze. A group of Russian Marines of the Black Sea Fleet landed in the Georgian port city in late October 1993 to protect an important railway between Poti and the Georgian capital Tbilisi. In November clashes between the Russians and the Zviadists erupted, with the Russian Major General Boris Djukov, claiming no Russian casualties. The fighting ended when the Georgian Armed Forces broke through the rebels' defenses and entered their capital Zugdidi on the 6th of November.

== Background ==
=== 1991–1992 Georgian coup d'état ===
In May 1991, Zviad Gamsakhurdia was elected as the first President of Georgia. However, in August 1991, the National Guard of Georgia split into pro- and anti-Gamsakhurdia factions after its commander Tengiz Kitovani declared disobedience to Gamsakhurdia. This conflict eventually led to the rebel factions of the National Guard, aided by a group of paramilitary organizations, staging a coup in Tbilisi against President Gamsakhurdia. This struggle, known as the Tbilisi War, would eventually lead to the president fleeing the country in early 1992 and a new government, the Military Council, taking over. This council was replaced by the State Council led by the new leader Eduard Shevardnadze two months later.

=== Civil war ===
However, Gamsakhurdia and his allies refused to recognize the new government and opted to set up government-in-exile in Chechnya. In Georgia, pro-Gamsakhurdia factions of the Georgian National Guard took control of Mingrelia, Gamsakhurdia's home region and political stronghold. The Military Council responded by launching an offensive. Poti, a strategic port town in Mingrelia, was seized by the forces of the Military Council after a battle around a bridge north of town on 27 January 1992, leaving 6 people dead and 20 injured.

Just like Gamsakhurdia, Shevardnadze faced an uprising of the Abkhazian and Ossetian separatists. South Ossetian war ended in June 1992 but another war broke out in Abkhazia in August 1992. The failure of Eduard Shevardnadze to regulate the conflict in Abkhazia in Georgia's favor diminished his credibility and some Georgian battalions switched their allegiance from Shevardnadze to Gamsakhurdia after a ceasefire agreement which provided for withdrawal of Georgian troops from Abkhazia and introduction of Russian peacekeepers instead. As a result, Zviadists increased their activities in western Georgia and they captured several towns in Mingrelia in August 1993. The Abkhaz separatists saw the opportunity and launched an attack on Sokhumi, the largest city in Abkhazia. Shevardnadze, who held several rounds of negotiations with Abkhazs and Russians, failed to stop the offensive, which led to Gamsakhurdia returning to Georgia from Chechnya on 24 September to lead the defence of Abkhazia. However, on 27 September, Sokhumi fell in the hands of Abkhaz separatists, which marked the Georgian defeat in the Abkhazian war. Immediately after the defeat in Abkhazia, Mingrelia became a battleground of the civil war between Gamsakhurdia's and Shevardnadze's troops.

== Battle ==
On 2 October 1993, Gamsakhurdia's forces launched an offensive on Poti. According to Georgian military spokesman Soso Margishvili, the offensive began in the morning with rocket attacks. Gamsakhurdia's troops, backed by tanks, fought through the city streets and captured the entire town by the late afternoon. At least 10 government soldiers died during the battle. The number of casualties on Gamsakhurdia's side is unknown. Gamsakhurdia's forces seized a large number of government arms evacuated from Abkhazia through Black Sea to Poti.

=== Georgian-Russian deal ===
After capturing Poti, Gamsakhurdia's troops swiftly proceeded to capture large swath of western Georgia and by 20 October they were forcing their way into Kutaisi, second largest city in Georgia. The capture of Kutaisi would have opened way towards Tbilisi, Georgia's capital, where Shevardnadze and his government were located. Gamsakhurdia demanded that Shevardnadze resign or face losing the country "bit by bit".

Following these developments, Shevardnadze decided to ask Russian president Boris Yeltsin to aid him in this conflict. He also joined the Russian-led Commonwealth of Independent States, an alliance made up of former Soviet states. The following days saw Russia supply weapons and technical assistance to Georgia, and Russian soldiers were preparing themselves to secure important Georgian supply routes. The Russian support turned the tide of the civil war. Despite this, the Russian military kept claiming neutrality.

=== Clashes ===
On 25 October, Shevardnadze's troops claimed to have retaken Poti with the Russian assistance, but the situation remained fluid. Russian Naval Infantry reached the shores off Poti and landed in the port city. They were supported by the Black Sea Fleet. Control of this flotilla was disputed, as the recently independent nation of Ukraine claimed ownership, because the home base of this fleet, Sevastopol, is on Ukrainian soil. Despite this, the Russians launched their intervention from this fleet, of which multiple ships would later patrol the waters off the Georgian coast to block any possible assistance to the Zviadists. The Naval Infantry secured the railway linking Poti and Tbilisi. Some days later, on Wednesday 2 November, the Zviadists equipped with armored vehicles seized one railway section close to Poti and attacked Russian warships for aiding Shevardnadze. They suffered unknown casualties, against no casualties on the Russian side. In the meantime, Shevardnadze's forces captured the vital logistics hub of Senaki. Following this, additional 9 Russian warships with 2,000 soldiers were deployed to Poti after an agreement with Shevardnadze, with plans to plant more Russian military personnel in Georgian cities.

== See also ==
- Georgian Civil War
- 1991–1992 Georgian coup d'état
- Russo-Georgian War
- Occupation of Poti
