= 2025 Georgian uprising attempt =

Attempt to overthrow the Ivanishvili government

- Part of 2024–2026 Georgian protests
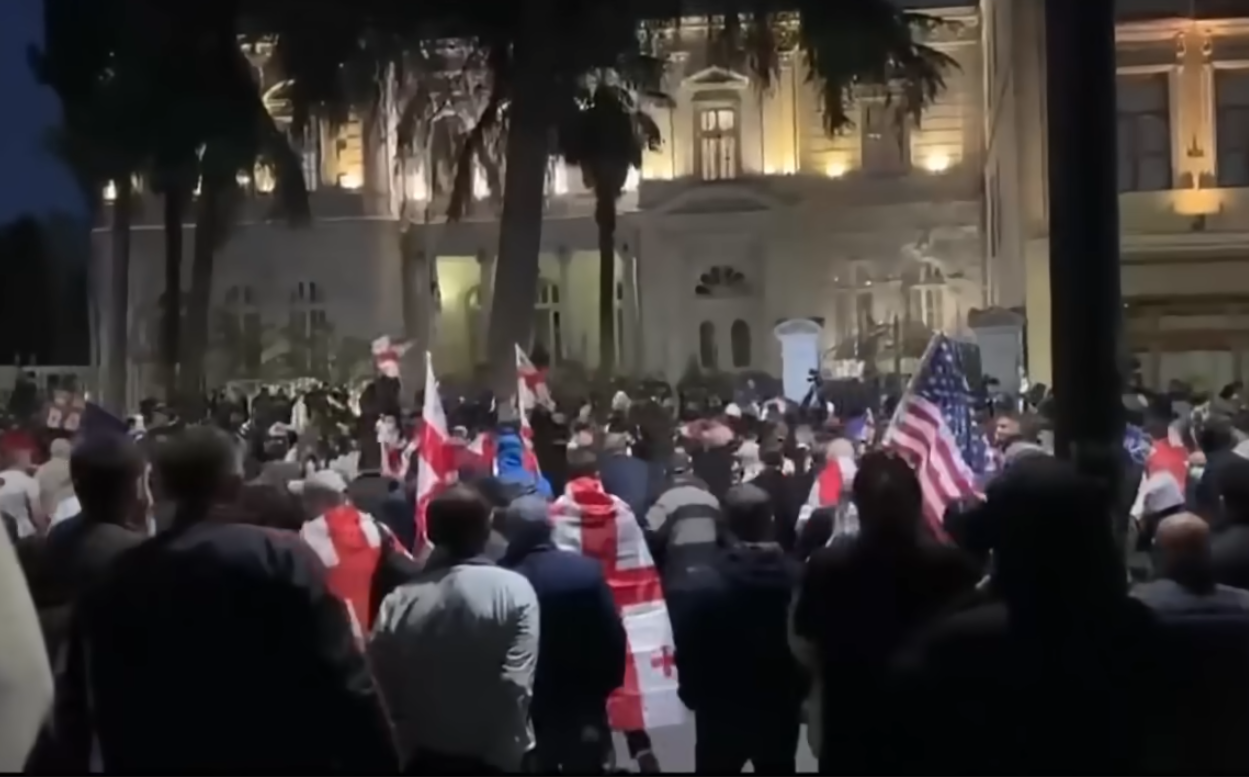
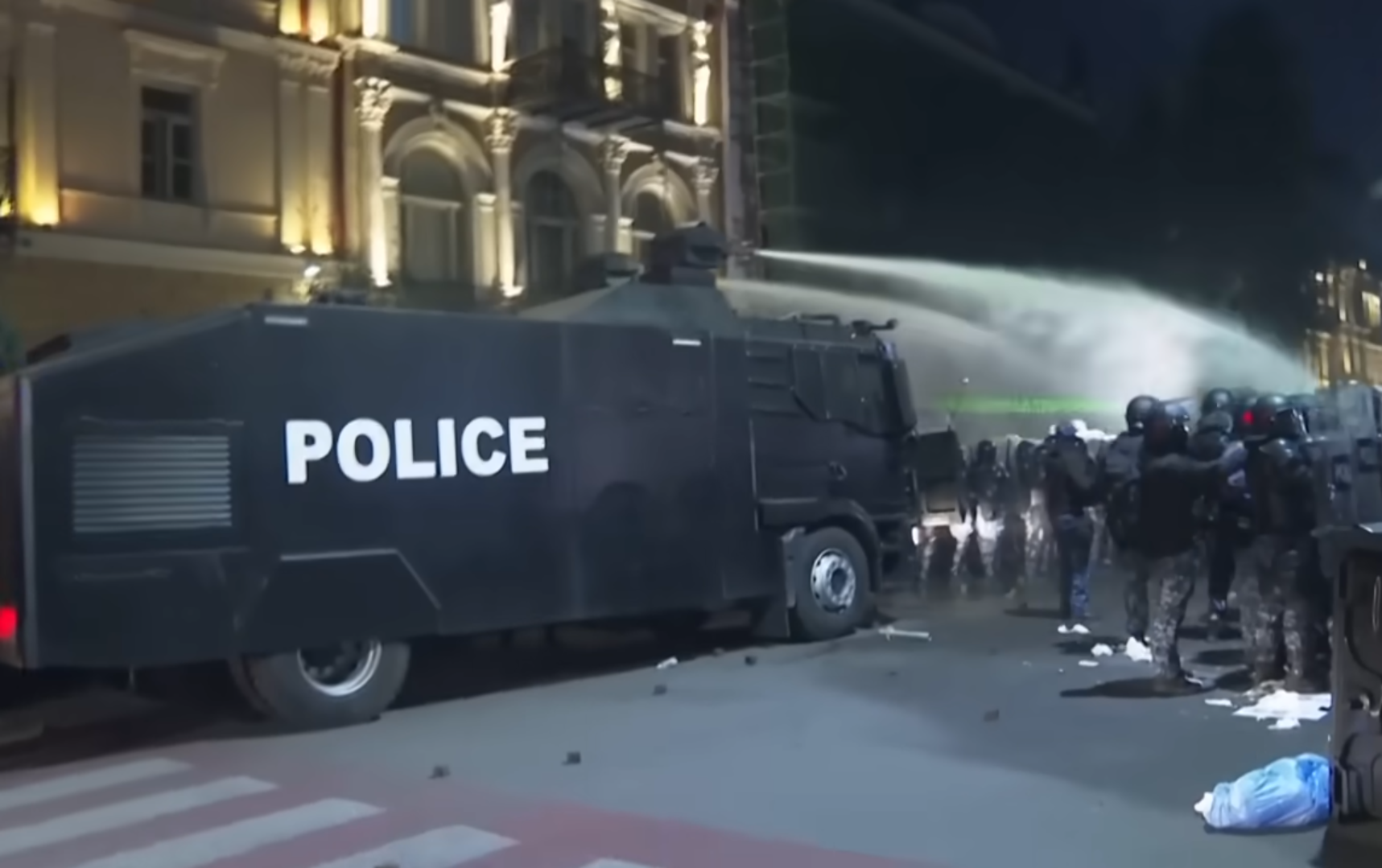
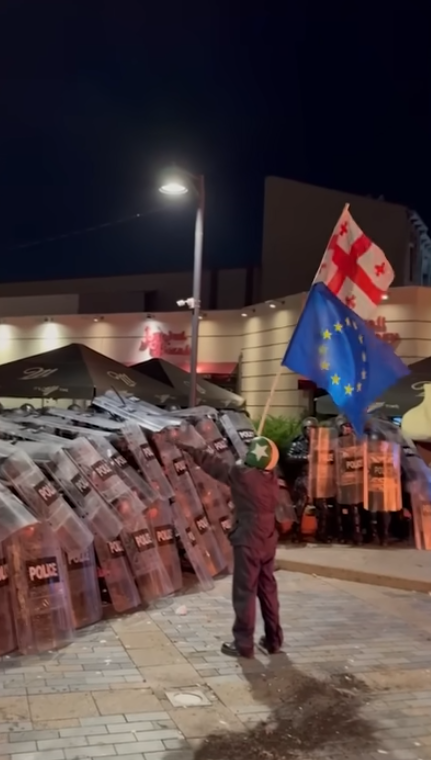
- Clockwise from top left: riot police using water cannons to disperse protesters on Atoneli Street; protesters attempting to storm the Orbeliani Palace; a female protester faces off against riot police.
- Date: 4 October 2025
- Location: Tbilisi, Georgia
- Caused by: Accusations of the 2024 Georgian parliamentary election being rigged Accusations of governmental illegitimacy
- Goals: Overthrow of the second Kobakhidze government
- Methods: Demonstrations, occupation of administrative buildings, riots
- Result: Government victory

Parties
Organizational Committee	Kobakhidze government: Ministry of Internal Affairs; Police of Georgia; Special Tasks Department; State Security Service; Prosecutor's Office; Georgian Dream

Lead figures
Paata Burchuladze (Independent); Murtaz Zodelava (United National Movement); Irakli Nadiradze (United National Movement); Paata Manjgaladze (Strategy Aghmashenebeli); Lasha Beridze	Irakli Kobakhidze; Bidzina Ivanishvili; Mamuka Mdinaradze; Gela Geladze

Number
20,000	

Casualties and losses
6 injured 64 arrested (Note: Including five organizers.)	21 policemen injured

On 4 October 2025, during the 2024–2026 Georgian political crisis, twenty thousand people held a rally in Tbilisi with the aim of ousting the incumbent Georgian Dream-led government of Georgia in what has been referred to as the Revolution of Flags. The day was coincided with that of the municipal elections in Georgia. Twenty thousand people listened to a declaration by opera singer Paata Burchuladze. Following the declaration, an attempt was made to storm Orbeliani Palace, the presidential residence, and was opposed by security forces with water cannon and tear gas. Security forces shortly after prevented any further attempts at storming the palace.

Prime Minister Irakli Kobakhidze reacted to the attempted revolution by promising to be "strict" with those who participated in it and vowing to tackle them with "zero sympathy".

== Plans and responses ==
Starting in June–July 2025, opera singer Paata Burchuladze proposed protests on the 4 October local election day with the aim of "tak[ing] over the government peacefully". He predicted a participation of 200 to 300 thousand people and that a "technical government" would replace the government of de facto leader Bidzina Ivanishvili.

Levan Khabeishvili of United National Movement (UNM) expressed his support for the plan on 23 June, stating, "hundreds of thousands of Georgians must take to the streets and return power to the people" in the 4 October protest. On 20 August, Khabeishvili described the plan as a "peaceful overthrow, a peaceful revolution", describing the 2018 Armenian Revolution, in which protests led to a power transfer from Serzh Sargsyan to Nikol Pashinyan, as an example. Khabeishvili was detained on 11 September, and four days later prevented from making phone calls or sending letters. Khabeishvili stated that GD had already "collapsed". Burchaladze referred to the 2025 Nepalese Gen Z protests and recommended that the Ivanishvili-led authorities treat the protestors peacefully, to avoid "uncontrolled crowds" carrying out actions similar to those of the Nepalese Gen Z protests.

On 3 October, Burchuladze stated that key state institutions would continue functioning under the planned revolution. He stated, "If any minister or high-ranking official flees, that will not cause a collapse of function. Such an outcome will not produce any collapse, not even for a short time. All vital state services such as healthcare, payroll and pension provision, public order, and others, will be guaranteed." On 4 October, he stated that the organising committee consisted of Irakli Nadiradze of UNM, former Chief Prosecutor Murtaz Zodelava, Colonel Lasha Beridze, Paata Manjgaladze of Strategy Aghmashenebeli, and himself.

=== Opposition parties ===
Opposition parties had diverse attitudes towards the planned revolution in September. Unity representatives expressed support for the plan. Federalists supported the plan to protest but were "cautious" about expectations of results of the protests. Irakli Kupradze of Lelo for Georgia supported the protest, while stating that the party would not take responsibility, as it was not organising the protest. Giorgi Gakharia of For Georgia described the proposal as an "uncertain project" having "violent overtones". Elene Khoshtaria of Droa was sceptical of the proposal because of the date having been announced in advance. Khabeishvili argued that opposition politicians who were sceptical of or opposed to the plan were "mak[ing] their biggest mistake by not believing in the people". GD representatives said that they expected the protests to be violent.

=== Arrests and government plans ===
GD authorities arrested Khabeishvili on 11 September, arguing that his offer to pay US$200,000 to riot police if they allowed the protests constituted a bribery attempt. Unity member Zviad Kuprava was arrested on 1 October, in response to his distribution of online advice on how the revolution would take place.

Irakli Nadiradze of UNM leaked an action plan from the Department of Special Tasks showing government preparations for a large-scale mobilization on 4 October. The plan includes deploying units of the Border Police, Security Police, Criminal Police, and General Inspection. According to the opposition, the document lists equipment and special measures that could be used against protesters, and indicates that security forces would be brought in from the regions for a mass concentration on Rustaveli Avenue. On 3 October, Irakli Kobakhidze, stated that any protestors "opposing the state system and law" would "receive the harshest response" and that "any act of violence [would] be met with the harshest lawful response".

Leaked lists of riot police and administration personnel, including names and addresses, circulated on social media, with activists claiming that more names would follow.

== 4 October ==
=== Protest and declaration ===
On the afternoon of 4 October, 20,000 people marched towards the protest venue in front of the parliament building in Tbilisi. Some protestors waved the Moldovan flag, having been inspired by the pro-European victory in Moldova despite heavy Russian electoral interference at the 2025 Moldovan parliamentary election days prior. Burchuladze read out a declaration to the people assembled at the protest venue, describing the event as Georgia's "first 'National Assembly'", with three points:

# The National Assembly declares that all power belongs to the Georgian people.

1. Following the 'falsified elections' on 26 October, the government has constitutionally lost its legitimacy, and therefore its authority is terminated.
2. The National Assembly declares a transitional period, which will ensure the peaceful assumption of power, the liberation of democratic institutions, the immediate restoration of dialogue for EU accession, and the protection of the country's security and peace.

— Paata Burchuladze, OC Media

He stated that the Ministry of Internal Affairs had to obey "the Georgian people and not Bidzina Ivanishvili" and called for police to detain GD members Irakli Kobakhidze, Shalva Papuashvili, Anzor Chubinidze, Mamuka Mdinaradze, Tea Tsulukiani, and Ivanishvili.

=== Attempted storming of Orbeliani Palace ===
Thousands of protestors marched towards Orbeliani Palace, the presidential residence, and were opposed by security forces with water cannon and tear gas. The protestors tore down part of the fence at the Palace. Clashes between protestors and security forces lasted for several hours.

== Arrests and legal case ==
By early morning on 5 October, all five co-organisers, Burchuladze, Nadiradze, Zodelava, Manjgaladze, and Beridze had been arrested by security forces.

Later the same day, Irakli Kobakhidze stated that all people involved in "[the] violent act" would be prosecuted. He described the events as having been an "attempted coup planned by foreign intelligence services" and backed by European Union officials. The Ministry of Internal Affairs stated that it had started an investigation into "calls to violently alter Georgia's constitutional order or overthrow state authority". On 6 October, charges against the five co-organisers were formally laid. The investigation was based on Articles 187, 222, 225, and 317 of the Criminal Code of Georgia.

== Injuries ==
According to the Ministry of Health, six protestors and 21 police officers were hospitalised, with one officer in serious condition.

== Analysis ==
On 5 October, Marika Mikiashvili of Droa described the attempted uprising as having had "extremely secretive and confusing" planning that "both made people confused and anxious, but also intrigued and hopeful". She stated that the effects on the opposition could not yet be assessed, while stating her view that "endurance and not yielding to the regime have been [opposition supporters'] key weapons in what is the most persistent resistance to autocracy in contemporary Europe."

The Georgian protest movement debated what had actually happened in the uprising attempt, its role on the protest movement and its use by the authorities to justify repression, and whether the uprising had actually been feasible as a single-day revolution. Questions about the uprising attempt included whether there had actually existed a concrete plan, whether security services had intervened, whether the Orbeliani Palace fence had been deliberately weakened, and whether the uprising organisers had had contacts with GD officials who promised cooperation.

According to Georgian lawyer Eduard Marikashvili, there are two common interpretations of the events: either there was a genuine uprising which failed, possibly with the "help" of the authorities, who exploited it for their own goals, or there was no actual uprising and it was all "carefully prepared provocation" to justify a subsequent crackdown on protests.

Activists Gota Chanturia of Movement for Social Democracy and Simon Janashia of Freedom Square viewed the attempted uprising organisers as having tried to divert the protest movement without having understood its social dynamics. They stated that the organisers had contacted the wider protest movement but the communication was not an "inclusive or democratic process".

Ana Tsitlidze of UNM stated that there had been a concrete plan that was only known to very few people due to security reasons. She stated that she did not know the details of the plan, but that it was "entirely peaceful". Tsitlidze stated that she hoped that the organisers would explain why the plan "[wasn't] executed as planned".

Iago Kachkachishvili of the Institute of Social Studies and Analysis in Tbilisi viewed the high participation at the 4 October protest as showing to both GD and wider Georgian society that opposition to GD was sustained. He stated that the uprising attempt had not discredited the protest movement, because "the violent episode was local and quickly dissipated" and "the movement did not identify with this violence". Kachkachishvili stated that "the protesting public [appeared to have] opted for a peaceful, long-term, and routine form of protest rather than acknowledging the possibility of an immediate change in power".

== Reactions ==
Salomé Zourabichvili, who sees herself as continuing to be the legitimate president of Georgia as of 5 October 2025, criticised the attempted storming of Orbeliani Palace as a "mockery ... [that] can only be staged by the regime to discredit the 310 days peaceful protest of the Georgian people". She stated, "I officially reject this and continue to stand with my people peacefully until we achieve new elections".

Moldovan president Maia Sandu expressed solidarity with Georgians after the 4 October protest, supporting their fight "for freedom and their European future" and stating "Democracy cannot be silenced. Moldova stands with you."

== See also ==
- 2024–2026 Georgian protests
- Rose Revolution
- List of protests in Georgia (country)
- 2019 Venezuelan uprising attempt
