= Ilia Tsulaia =

Georgian politician and businessman

Ivliane Tsulaia
- ივლიანე წულაია

Member of the Parliament of Georgia
- In office 18 November 2016 – 2020
- Constituency: Didube (No. 16)

Personal details
- Born: Ivliane Tsulaia; July 11, 1982 (age 44) Samtredia, Georgia
- Citizenship: Georgia
- Spouse: Ketevan Gotsadze
- Children: 3
- Relatives: Tengiz Tsulaia (brother)
- Education: Ivane Javakhishvili Tbilisi State University; Harvard Business School; (Owner/President Management Program, 2022–2024)
- Occupation: Businessman
- Known for: Founder and chairman of Archi Group; Shark Tank Georgia
- Website: https://archi.ge/

Ilia Tsulaia (Georgian: ილია წულაია; born 11 July 1982) is a Georgian businessman. He founded Archi, a Tbilisi-based real estate developer, in 2006, and chairs its supervisory board. Tsulaia was a member of the Parliament of Georgia from 2016 to 2020, and in 2022 he appeared as one of the investors on the television series Shark Tank Georgia.

== Biography ==
Tsulaia was born on 11 July 1982 in Samtredia, in western Georgia, and graduated from the Faculty of Law of Ivane Javakhishvili Tbilisi State University. He is married to Ketevan Gotsadze, and they have three children.

From 2022 to 2024 he attended the Owner/President Management (OPM) program at Harvard Business School, an executive education program for business owners and founders. He has also completed executive courses on persuasion, negotiation and strategic leadership at Harvard and INSEAD.

== Career ==
=== Law ===
Tsulaia began his career in 2004 as a lawyer at Gabisonia, Dietrich & Partners, and a year later became managing partner of the law firm Digesta.

=== Archi Group ===
In 2006, Tsulaia left legal practice to found Archi Group. He led the company as chief executive until 2016 and later became chairman of its supervisory board; his partners in the business include Israeli businessman Meni Benish and two-time NBA champion Zaza Pachulia. In 2014 he also founded Ytong Caucasus, a joint venture with the German company Xella that supplies Ytong aerated concrete blocks in Georgia. Since September 2021, these high-quality blocks have been produced in Georgia, at a Tbilisi factory opened by Archi together with Xella and the Partnership Fund.

Archi is the largest real estate developer in Georgia, with a market share of more than 18%. It has completed more than 55 projects totalling over one million square metres, and has more than 70,000 residents and investors from 34 countries. The company's portfolio spans luxury residential complexes, mixed-use developments and hotels across Georgia, such as the Archi Ramada Batumi and Le Méridien Sioni Lake, as well as hydroelectric, solar and wind power plants. In 2024 Archi engaged Deloitte to review its consolidated financial statements, and it holds ISO 9001:2015 quality certification from TÜV NORD. In 2026 the international consultancy ENVIROS, part of the Société Générale group, found that the company's Archi Horizon complex in Tbilisi demonstrates outstanding energy efficiency and meets European standards.

One of Archi's major projects is Archi Grand Avenue, a 21-hectare district in Tbilisi on the site of a former railway car repair plant acquired in 2025. The district will include a five-star Hilton hotel, Wyndham Residences and 15 hectares of recreational space with leisure and children's areas, cycling paths, a skatepark and an urban amphitheatre. In 2026 Archi partnered with the Trump Organization to bring Trump Tower to Tbilisi; designed by Gensler, the skyscraper is planned to be the tallest building in Georgia. The same year it signed a strategic partnership with BI Group, Central Asia's largest developer, to deliver joint projects in Georgia. Outside Georgia, the company has expanded to the United States with Archi Miami, a planned residential complex in Pompano Beach, Florida.

=== Parliament ===
Tsulaia was a member of the 9th convocation of the Parliament of Georgia from 18 November 2016 to 2020, where he sat on the Legal Affairs Committee and later on the Procedural Issues and Rules Committee.

== Other activities ==
Tsulaia has been a board member of the Business Association of Georgia and a member of the Marshall Goldsmith 100 Coaches network since 2019, and has served as Honorary Consul of Latvia in Georgia since 2023. Archi, which he chairs, directs 5% of its profits to environmental, charitable and healthy-lifestyle initiatives.
