= List of protests in Georgia (country) =

This is a list of protests in the Republic of Georgia:

- 1956 Georgian demonstrations
- 1978 Georgian demonstrations
- April 9 tragedy (1989)
- 1989 Sukhumi riots
- February 2 massacre (1992)
- Rose Revolution (2003)
- 2007 Georgian demonstrations
- Protests regarding the Russo-Georgian War
- 2009 Georgian demonstrations
- 2011 Georgian protests
- 2013 Tbilisi anti-homophobia rally protests
- 2018 Georgian protests
- 2019 Georgian protests
- 2020–2021 Georgian political crisis
- 2021 Tbilisi Pride protests
- 2023–2024 Georgian protests
- 2024–2025 Georgian protests
