= Protests regarding the Russo-Georgian War =

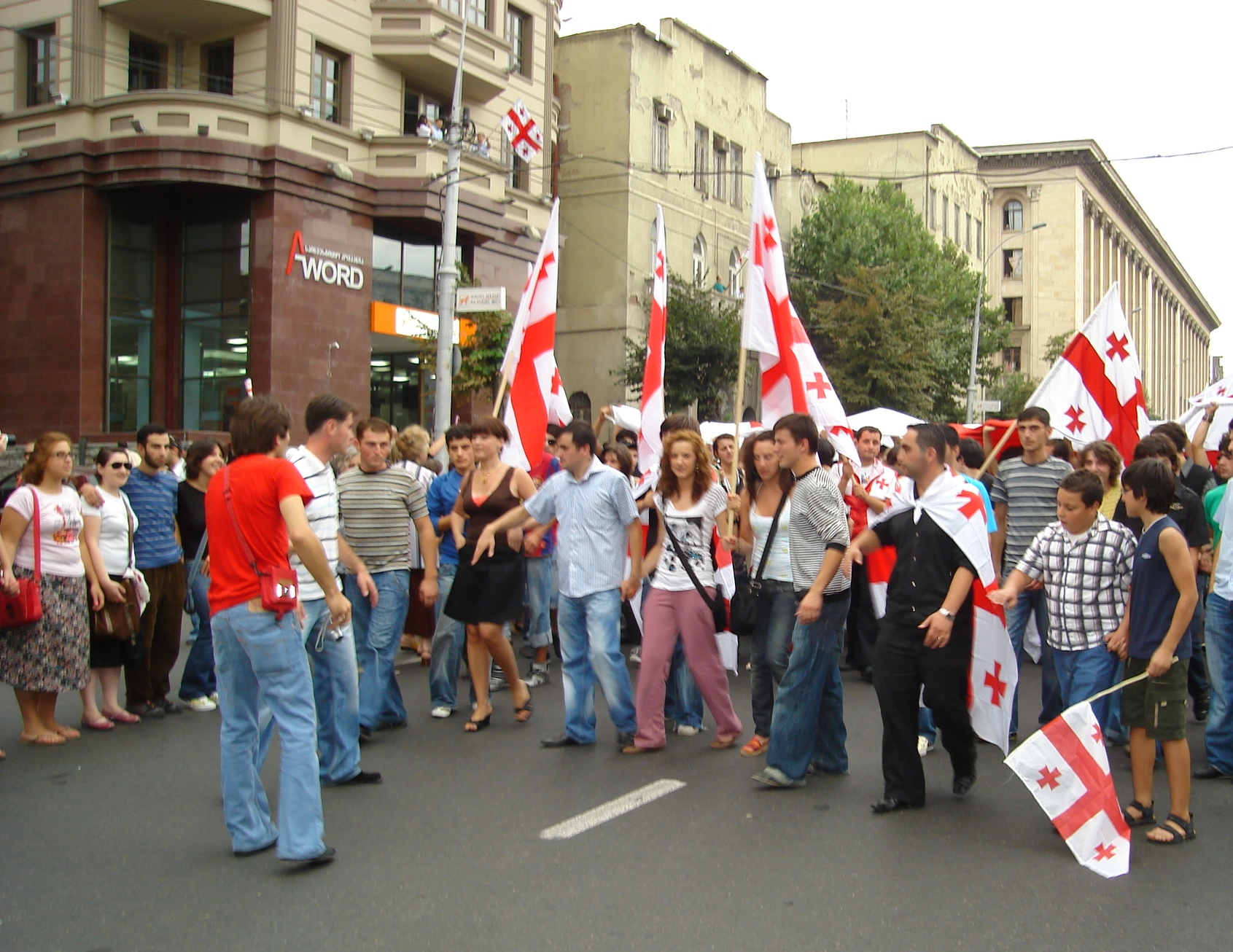
Protest in Tbilisi in September 2008

During the Russo-Georgian War, demonstrations were held all over the world to protest the Russian invasion of Georgia. Manifestations were also held in support of Russia and the separatists of South Ossetia and Abkhazia. Pro-Georgian demonstrations received the largest turnout in the Baltic States, where thousands marched in protest, whereas large pro-Russia camps were observed in Russia and Serbia.

== Protests against Russian involvement in Georgia ==
Countries	Protest	Photo
Armenia	Young people with descent from Georgia rallied near the Russian embassy in Yerevan. Young students also protested against media manipulation of Armenian people, who were fed solely with pro-Russian narrative. The actions were not welcomed by the local authorities. On 11 August 2008, the students said that they were asked to leave the country.	
Austria	A rally was organized in Vienna.	
Azerbaijan	On 11 August 2008, a rally was held in front of Russian embassy in Azerbaijan against the Russian invasion of Georgia, which was disbanded by the police. On 13 August 2008, the fourth rally was held near the Russian embassy.	
Belarus	On 11 August 2008, Young Front organised the rally near the Russian Embassy in Minsk with streamers: "Stop aggression", "Russia-Georgia: war with peacekeeping goals?" "One sixth part of land – is it not enough?" The petition was handed to workers of the embassy. In 10 minutes into the rally, Police officers armed with machine guns arrived and broke up the rally, detaining 4 protesters. Due to activists sitting on the ground, policemen carried them to police car in arms.	
Belgium	On 11 August 2008, meetings against Russian military presence in Georgia have been held in Brussels. About 200 people rallied. Another rally near the Permanent Mission of Russia to the EU was held by 300 Georgians. According to Russian envoy to NATO Dmitry Rogozin, the police did nothing to disperse the Georgian picketers and unblock the building housing the Russian mission even after the formal complaint had been submitted. On 18 August 2008, Manneken Pis fountain sculpture in Brussels was dressed in Georgian national clothes.	
Canada	On 11 August 2008, a group of Georgians who live and work in Canada held a protest in front of the Russian consulate in Montreal. On 13 August 2008, about 30 pro-Georgian demonstrators held a protest near the Russian embassy in Ottawa.	
China	On 10 August 2008, the Georgian Olympic Team protested against Russia in Beijing. On 11 August 2008, a group of Georgians held a rally near the Russian embassy in Beijing.	
Czech Republic	About three hundred opponents of Russian military operations in the Caucasus, Georgians and Czechs, protested outside the Russian embassy in Prague on 12 August 2008. A human chain was set up in the centre of Prague on 1 September 2008.	
Cyprus	On 12 August 2008, a group of Georgians held a protest in front of the Russian embassy in Nicosia.	
Estonia	On 10 August 2008, a rally was held in Tallinn. However, a group of Russians from the embassy clashed with pro-Georgian protesters. On 11 August 2008, 500 citizens of Estonia protested against Russia on Town Hall Square in Tallinn.	
Finland	On 11 August 2008, a group of Georgians who live and work in Finland held a rally near the Russian embassy in Helsinki.	
France	On 10 August 2008, a group of Georgians held a protest in front of the Russian embassy in Paris. On the anniversary of the invasion on 8 August 2009, around 40 Georgians protested near the Russian embassy in Paris.	
Germany	On 12 August 2008, a group of Georgians held a protest in Berlin.	
Georgia	On 8 August 2008, a rally was held near the Russian Embassy in Tbilisi where the Russian actions were condemned. The protesters announced that the rally would continue during the night of 9 August. 3 thousand protesters surrounded the embassy during the night. On 9 August 2008, a rally, named "Stop Russia", was held in the Rose Revolution Square in Tbilisi. On 10 August 2008, 20 thousand people gathered in the Rose Revolution Square to support the Georgian Army. Georgian president Saakashvili called for a demonstration to be held at 15:00 on 12 August in Tbilisi. During the march towards Freedom Square, Tbilisi, one participant held a banner, with Putin's image on it, reading, "Wanted: crimes against humanity and the world." On 12 August 2008, Latvian Prime Minister Ivars Godmanis and presidents of Poland, Ukraine, Estonia and Lithuania arrived in Georgia in support of Georgian President Mikheil Saakashvili. They attended the rally in Tbilisi. The rally in front of the parliament was attended by nearly 150,000 people. The crowd responded enthusiastically to the Polish president's speech, chanting "Poland, Poland", "Friendship, Friendship" and "Georgia, Georgia". Lech Kaczyński said that Russia's neighbors were telling "no" to Russia's attempt to return to "old times". Kaczyński said: "Everyone knows the next one could be Ukraine, and then Poland. All of Europe should be here now." Godmanis, Yushchenko, Kaczynski, Ilves and Adamkus held their joined hands in the air in front of spectators in the Georgian national colours of red and white, who were waving flags of the US, the European Union, France, Estonia, Lithuania and Ukraine. "I am a Georgian," said Estonian president Ilves. President of Estonia Ilves invoked No pasarán slogan used by the Spanish anti-Fascisc forces. Ilves also stated that "if you do not believe in freedom and democracy, you don't belong in Europe." Russia's UN ambassador Vitaly Churkin called the attendance of European leaders a "rhetoric". On 17 August 2008, ethnic Armenians living in Tbilisi held a meeting in the Petros Adamian Tbilisi State Armenian Drama Theatre and demanded to stop the Russian attack on Georgia. On 22 August, the staff of the Armenian Theatre of Tbilisi held a rally in Igoeti demanding the withdrawal of the Russian troops from Georgia. The participants were holding banners: "Today we all are Georgians!" On 18 August 2008, Georgian protesters brought the toilet seats, toilet paper rolls and other items similar to those that had been marauded by the Russian army near the Russian embassy in Tbilisi. On 1 September 2008, ethnic Georgian, who had been Russian citizen since 1993, burned his Russian passport near the Russian embassy in Tbilisi in protest of the Russian burning of the Georgian villages near Gori. On 1 September 2008, tens of thousands people linked in a human chain in Tbilisi and also in other towns of Georgia (such as Poti and Gori) to protest the Russian military occupation of the country. Georgian authorities said it was the biggest rally ever in their country.	
Greece	On 12 August 2008, three rallies were held against Russia. About 300 persons took part in the largest protest in Thessaloniki. About 500 Georgians marched in Athens in early September 2008.	
Hungary	On 15 August 2008, Fidelitas (the youth branch of the Fidesz party) and the Federation of Young Christian Democrats organized the demonstration near the Russian embassy in Budapest.	
Iceland	On 12 August 2008, in Iceland's capital Reykjavík, Lithuanians residing in Iceland rallied in front of the Russian embassy. Their spokesperson told the newspaper Fréttablaðið, "Lithuanians were in a similar position two decades ago and therefore Georgians have our complete compassion."	
Israel	On 9 August 2008, Jews from Georgia protested against the Russian invasion of Georgia in front of the Russian embassy in Tel Aviv. There was a protest near the Russian embassy on 11 August and a human chain was formed between American and French embassies on 14 August 2008.	
Italy	On 10 August 2008, Georgians living in Milan protested against Russian intervention in Georgia.	
Japan	In August 2008, Georgians living in Tokyo protested against Russia.	
Latvia	On 11 August 2008, more than 2,000 people marched in Riga from the Freedom Monument to the Russian Embassy. On 13 August, seven persons organised a rally at the Russian Embassy. Participants were confronted by supporters of Russia. People also were asked to light candles to show support to civilians of Georgia at the Riga Castle during Riga City Festival, which was held on 15–17 August.	
Lithuania	On 11 August 2008, there was a protest in Vilnius. On 13 August 2008, people gathered in Lithuania's capital Vilnius to protest Russia's invasion into Georgia and to support Georgia. People were also saying "Hands off Georgia!" On 13 August 2008, people protested near Russia's General Consulate in Klaipėda, Lithuania. On 14 August 2008, music festival Be2gether started in Lithuania with a rally to support Georgia.	
Moldova	On 11 August 2008, members of the Liberal Party of Moldova held a protest in front of the Russian embassy in Chişinău.	
Netherlands	On 11 August 2008, Georgians living in Netherlands protested against Russian intervention in Georgia in front of the Russian embassy in The Hague.	
Norway	On 11 August 2008, around 50 Georgians held a peaceful protest against Russia outside the Russian embassy in Oslo, Norway.	
Poland	On 9 August 2008, around 100 people held a rally in front of the Russian embassy in Warsaw. On 11 September 2008, a rally was held during a visit of Russian Foreign Minister Sergey Lavrov in Warsaw, with Polish protesters demanding a court trial for Vladimir Putin for Russia's actions in Georgia.	
Portugal	On 13 August 2008, a group of Georgians who live in Portugal held a protest in front of the Russian embassy in Lisbon.	
Romania	On 14 August 2008, about 100 people gathered for a flashmob in front of the Russian embassy in Bucharest, Romania, protesting against Russia's invasion of Georgia and in support of Georgian civilians, the event being organized by the Green Association, New Right Organisation and the Pro Democracy Association.	
Russia	On 9 August 2008, youth held an unsanctioned rally against the war in Perm, Russia. On 22 August 2008, Russian Rock singer Mikhail Borzikyn protested the war in Georgia and dedicated a song to Georgia during the concert in Saint Petersburg. The Russian police attempted to arrest the musician, but the audience did not allow them. On 24 August 2008, 7 people protested against the Russian invasion of Georgia in the Red Square in Moscow. The rally was also dedicated to the Warsaw Pact invasion of Czechoslovakia in 1968. The Russian police arrested 3 protesters and 5 journalists. On 25 August 2008, about 150 people, including Russian human rights activists, demonstrated against the war and Russian military presence in Georgia near the Chistye Prudy station in Moscow. On 24 September 2008, Russian band DDT performed an anti-war concert at the Olympic Stadium in Moscow. Georgian singer Nino Katamadze and Ossetian folk band also performed. It was announced that part of the raised funds would be donated to the victims of the war. The Russian opposition and human rights activists scheduled a rally against the continued Russian military presence in Georgia near the Chistye Prudy station in Moscow on 9 October 2008. 50 people participated in the rally, which was observed by 3 busload of OMON forces.	
Spain	On 11 August 2008, a group of Georgians protested in front of the Russian embassy in Madrid.	
Sweden	On 12 August 2008, a group of Georgians and Swedes rallied in front of the Russian embassy in Stockholm.	
Switzerland	On 11 August 2008, a group of Georgians protested in front of the Russian embassy in Geneva.	
Turkey	On 13 August 2008, a group of Georgians held a protest in Istanbul against the Russian occupation of Georgia. Turkish writer Fahrettin Çiloğlu also took part in a rally.	
Ukraine	About 50 people protested near the Russian Embassy in Kyiv, holding banners: "Aggression against Georgia is aggression against Ukraine!", "Georgia today, Ukraine tomorrow?", "Putin+Medvedev=Hitler", and Ukrainian and Georgian flags. A rally was also organized in Odesa. On 11 August, the UNA-UNSO organization protested near the Russian embassy. The organizers suspected that Russia would claim Crimea after Georgia. Daily picketing against the Russian consulate in Kharkiv started on 9 August 2008. Georgian diaspora was still protesting on August 13. The Georgian diaspora and Ukrainian nationalists were planning to picket the Russian consulate in Lviv on 13 August. On 16 August 2008, a theatrical performance against Russia's anti-Georgian propaganda was organized in Kyiv. On 23 August 2008, Our Ukraine (political party) announced that a Flash mob in support of Georgian president Saakashvili would be held in Maidan Nezalezhnosti and participants would eat ties.	
United Kingdom	On 10 August 2008, a group of Georgians protested in front of the Russian embassy in London. About 150 people took part in a rally in Trafalgar Square in early September 2008.	
United States	On 10 August 2008, in Georgia in the United States, more than 100 Georgian people rallied at Centennial Olympic Park. The rally was also attended by Atlanta Hawks [professional basketball] player Zaza Pachulia. On 14 August 2008, people gathered at the Headquarters of the United Nations and the Russian Consulate in New York City to protest against the presence of Russian forces in Georgia. Similar protests were made by people of Georgian ancestry in other US cities, including Chicago, Seattle, and Los Angeles.	

== Protests supporting South Ossetia, Russia and/or Abkhazia ==
Countries	Protest	Photo
Armenia	On 16 September 2008, a meeting was held near the Russian embassy in memory of the South Ossetian victims of the war.	
Belgium	Protests were held in Brussels during the visit of the US State Secretary Condoleezza Rice.	
Estonia	On 14 August 2008, the pro-Russian group Nochnoy Dozor held a meeting in front of the Russian embassy to support Russia. Russian ambassador Nikolay Uspensky thanked them.	
France	On 29 September 2008, South Ossetians picketed the building of the Council of Europe in Strasbourg.	
Greece	On 20 September 2008, a protest was held in Athens against the Greek participation in the EU monitoring mission in Georgia.	
Latvia	On 13 August 2008, NGO Rodina and others organized a few hundred people to gather in front of the Russian embassy in Riga in support of Russia.	
Moldova	Pro-Russian demonstrations were held in front of the US embassy in the capital Chişinău where protesters held a banner that said "For South Ossetia. To Saakashvili and Bush - Hussein's destiny".	
Netherlands	On 12 August 2008, a group of Ossetians living in the Netherlands protested in The Hague to support South Ossetia and against Mikheil Saakashvili.	
Russia	On 3 August 2008, a rally against Georgian president Mikheil Saakashvili was held in Vladikavkaz. On 5 August 2008, the residents of Beslan in North Ossetia held a rally demanding to stop "provocations" against South Ossetia. Russian youth activists held a rally near the Georgian embassy in Moscow. Russian police supported the rally. A rally was held in Novosibirsk on 5 August 2008. The pro-Government youth held a rally against Georgia on 9 August and 10 August. On 8 August 2008, the Ossetian residents of Moscow held an unsanctioned rally near the Russian Foreign Ministry. Ossetians in Saint Petersburg held a rally on the Field of Mars (Saint Petersburg). The mayor of Khasavyurt organized a rally to support South Ossetia. Russian youth and communist organizations began picketing at the Georgian embassy in Moscow at 18:30 on August 8. The protesters were shouting the slogan: "Tskhinval - Russian city!". Picketing resumed the next day at 09:00. On 9 August 2008, the Ossetian diaspora in Moscow organised a meeting in front of the US embassy against Georgia's actions and their support from USA. 400 people gathered in the Freedom Square in Vladikavkaz and demanded meeting with Russia's Prime minister Vladimir Putin. However, the North Ossetian government official explained that Putin had already left for Alagir. On 10 August, Aleksandr Dugin and his young supporters held a rally against Georgia in Moscow, meanwhile also demanding the release of Radovan Karadžić. On 11 August, the Young Guard of United Russia announced that they would picket the Georgian embassy. The Young Guard of United Russia again picketed the Georgian embassy on 14 August 2008. On 11 August, a rally was held against Saakashvili in Nalchik. A rally in solidarity with South Ossetia was held in Orenburg. On 12 August, more than 3,000 people in Makhachkala protested against Georgia and supported South Ossetia. On 12 August, the rallies were held in Kemerovo and Khabarovsk. On 13 August, the embassy of the United Kingdom was picketed by young Orthodox believers, who lit the candles. On 14 August, a torchlight procession was held in Petropavlovsk-Kamchatskiy. On 25 August, more than 100 pro-Russian ethnic Georgians held a rally near the Georgian embassy in Moscow condemning Georgian president Saakashvili for the war and approving of the Russian invasion of Georgia. Eurasian Youth Union announced that it would hold a rally against Echo of Moscow on 16 September 2008, because the radio station was a "traitor" supporting "Georgian war criminals". On 29 September 2008, the Ossetian activists picketed the Swedish Embassy in Moscow.	
Serbia	On 13 August 2008, protests were held in center of Belgrade to support Russia. More than 500 people participated in the protests, where the major slogan was "Say no to war in Ossetia". On 14 August, Serb citizens visited the Russian embassy in Belgrade and signed a book of condolences for the South Ossetian victims. Russian Ambassador Aleksander Konuzin thanked the Serbian people and stated that he is very pleased because Serbs "did not fall for a propaganda scam, that is attempting to present an aggression on the part of the Georgian army against its own citizens as a conflict between Georgia and Russia" and added that "Russians will never go to war against Georgians".	
South Ossetia	In late August, a concert was held in Tskhinvali in memory of the war victims. The concert was conducted by Valery Gergiev, an ethnic Ossetian conductor.	
Transnistria	On 8 August 2008, protesters condemned Georgian actions at the meeting held in the city of Tiraspol. Viktor Kostyrko, mayor of Tiraspol, claimed that with the help from Russia, war would be stopped.	
Turkey	On 13 August 2008, around 100 protesters rallied outside the Georgian Consulate in Istanbul shouting slogans "Free Ossetia! Free Abkhazia!". Protesters condemned Georgian President Mikheil Saakashvili. They also spoke against Turkey's and the Turkish press's position.	
Ukraine	On 9 August 2008, shops in Sevastopol exhibited signs that they were not selling the Georgian products. The NGOs of the Orthodox believers and mothers held a rally near the Ukrainian Foreign Ministry demanding to stop supporting Georgia and urged the citizens of Ukraine to boycott the Georgian products. On 11 August 2008, the protesters in Crimea burned the portraits of Georgian president Saakashvili and Adolf Hitler in Simferopol and expressed their support for Russia. On 12 August 2008, the Russian people protested against Georgia in Simferopol. Pro-Russian rallies were also held in Odesa, Sevastopol and Kharkiv. The Ossetian mob in Odesa attacked the Georgian woman near the Georgian consulate, but the woman was saved by the Ukrainians. On 14 September 2008, a rally in support of Russia and South Ossetia was held in Simferopol and the statement was released, which condemned the "fascist regime of Saakashvili" armed by the "Ukrainian regime". The statement also accused Viktor Yushchenko and the United States of attempting to provoke a conflict with Russia in Crimea. On 2 December 2008, pro-Russian activists attempted to enter the building of the city administration of Sevastopol. Pro-Russian activists announced they were protesting against signing a friendship treaty with the Georgian city of Poti, because the Russian warships had been attacked from Poti in August 2008. The protesters wanted to give ties to the head of the city administration as present so "he would eat them together with Saakashvili". On 8 August 2009, a rally in Simferopol supported Russia and demanded from the Ukrainian authorities to halt sending weaponry to Georgia.	

== See also ==
- International reaction to the Russo-Georgian War
- Protests against the Russian invasion of Ukraine
