= Nikoloz Janjgava =

Georgian major-general (born 1970)

- Born: April 23, 1970 (age 56)
- Military career
- Allegiance: Georgia
- Branch: Georgian Army
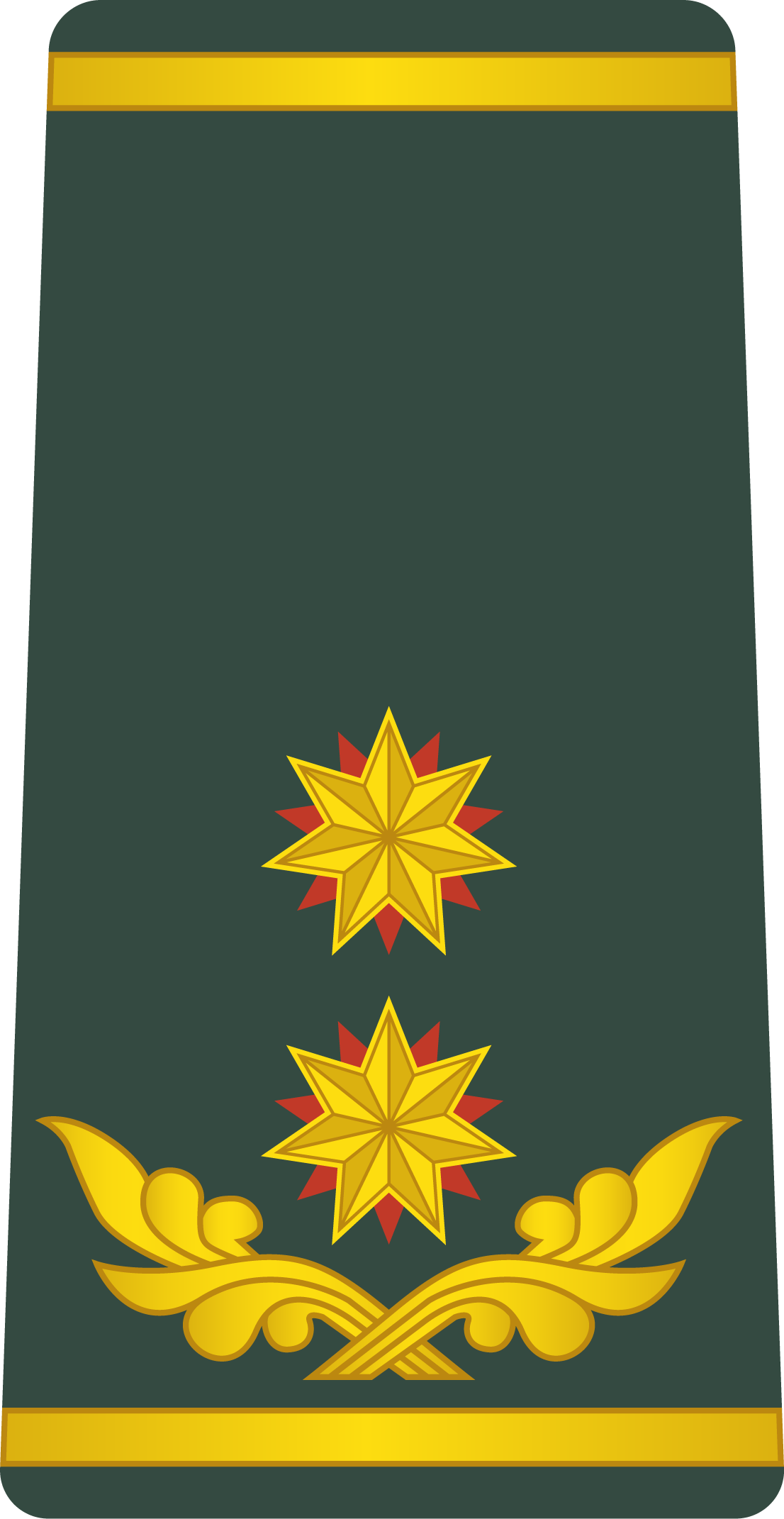
- Rank
- Commands: Georgian Land Forces: Special Operations Forces; National Guard of Georgia; Training and Education Command Center; ISAF-Georgia
- Conflicts: unknown War in Afghanistan
- Other work: Military historian, analyst

Nikoloz "Nika" (Nick) Janjgava (Georgian: ნიკოლოზ [ნიკა] ჯანჯღავა; born 23 April 1970) is a Georgian major general, military historian and currently a deputy chief of general staff of the Defense Forces of Georgia. One of the first Georgian officers to be trained in the United States, he occupied various key posts in the armed forces from 1998 to 2012. During his career, Janjgava had thrice collided with the Georgian authorities over defence policy and making allegations of corruption in the military, leading to his dismissals from the army in 1998, 2002, and 2012.

== Education ==
Educated as a historian at the Tbilisi State University, where he would obtain a doctorate in 2003, Janjgava was conscripted into the Soviet military from 1988 to 1989. He received military training at the Joint Military Academy of the Ministry of Defense of Georgia in 1993 and continued his education in Germany in 1994 and the United States in 1995, eventually graduating from the United States Army Command and General Staff College in 2002.

== Career ==
Janjgava joined the Georgian military in 1992, serving as an officer with the Defense Ministry's Foreign Relations Directorate from 1992 to 1996. In 1995 he underwent US airborne and Ranger qualification at Fort Benning and was the very first soldier in the Georgian Armed Forces to have received US special operations forces tabs and the first special forces member of the Georgian army. He went on serving as senior officer with the Tactical Intelligence Directorate from 1996 until his dismissal, in 1998, by the Defense Minister Vardiko Nadibaidze over Janjgava's newspaper article, accusing the Georgian military leadership of corruption and incompetence. The same year, Nadibaidze's successor, David Tevzadze, restored Janjgava to the army, appointing him as commander of a special forces unit in 1998, subsequently commander of the Rapid Reaction Forces in 2000, and acting commander of the Georgian Land Forces in 2002. He had also completed the special forces qualification and special forces officer course of the United States in 1999 and 2000 at Fort Bragg and would proceed attending and completing special courses in Canada and Greece. At that time, Janjgava was considered to be one of Georgia's most promising young officers and a leading advocate of pro-American military modernization. In July 2002, he ran afoul of Tevzadze and resigned, citing corruption and "intolerable conditions" in the army.

Janjgava returned to the military after the regime change in Georgia as a result of the November 2003 Rose Revolution. He served as the head of the Defense Ministry's Combat Training Department from 2004 to 2005 and commander of the 4th Mechanised Infantry Brigade from 2005 to 2007. On 18 January 2007, Colonel Janjgava was appointed the chief of the National Guard Department, tasked with the training of military reserve. He was unexpectedly dismissed in December 2007, due to, as some Georgian military analysts suggested, a number of live rounds accidents during reservist training.

Janjgava then was a military attache to Greece, Serbia, and the Republic of Macedonia from 2008 to 2009, head of J-5 Strategic Planning and Military Policy Department in 2009, and commander of Military Education and Training Command from 2009 to 2011. In 2011, he commanded the Georgian military mission under the International Security Assistance Force in Afghanistan. In 2012, Janjgava headed the Georgian Joint Chiefs of Staff's Strategic Planning Department before his dismissal in August 2012. He was put under arrest charged with "insubordination and confrontation with police" from August to October 2012.

In March 2013, Janjgava resumed his service with the Ministry of Defense in the position of attache to Italy and San Marino.

Currently he holds the position of deputy chief of general staff of the Georgian defense forces and was promoted to Brigadier in 2019.

== Awards ==
Janjgava has been awarded several special service military ribbons and medals from Georgia, the United States, Canada, and Greece. He was decorated with the Order of Honor by the Georgian government in 2001.

- US National Guard (state of Georgia) Special Operations ribbon, 1996
- US Army Ranger and Special Forces tab
- Special Service Medal (Canada)
- Knight of Honor, Honor Medal (Georgia), 2001
- Virtuous Service Medal (Georgia), 2009
- Military Honor Medal (Georgia)
- Parachutist wings from the US, Greece, Canada and Georgia

== Publications ==
In 2012 colonel Janjgava released an article in the Connections Quarterly Journal named "Disputes in the Arctic: Threats and Opportunities".
