= Military Band of the National Guard of Georgia =

- საქართველოს ეროვნული გვარდიის ორკესტრი
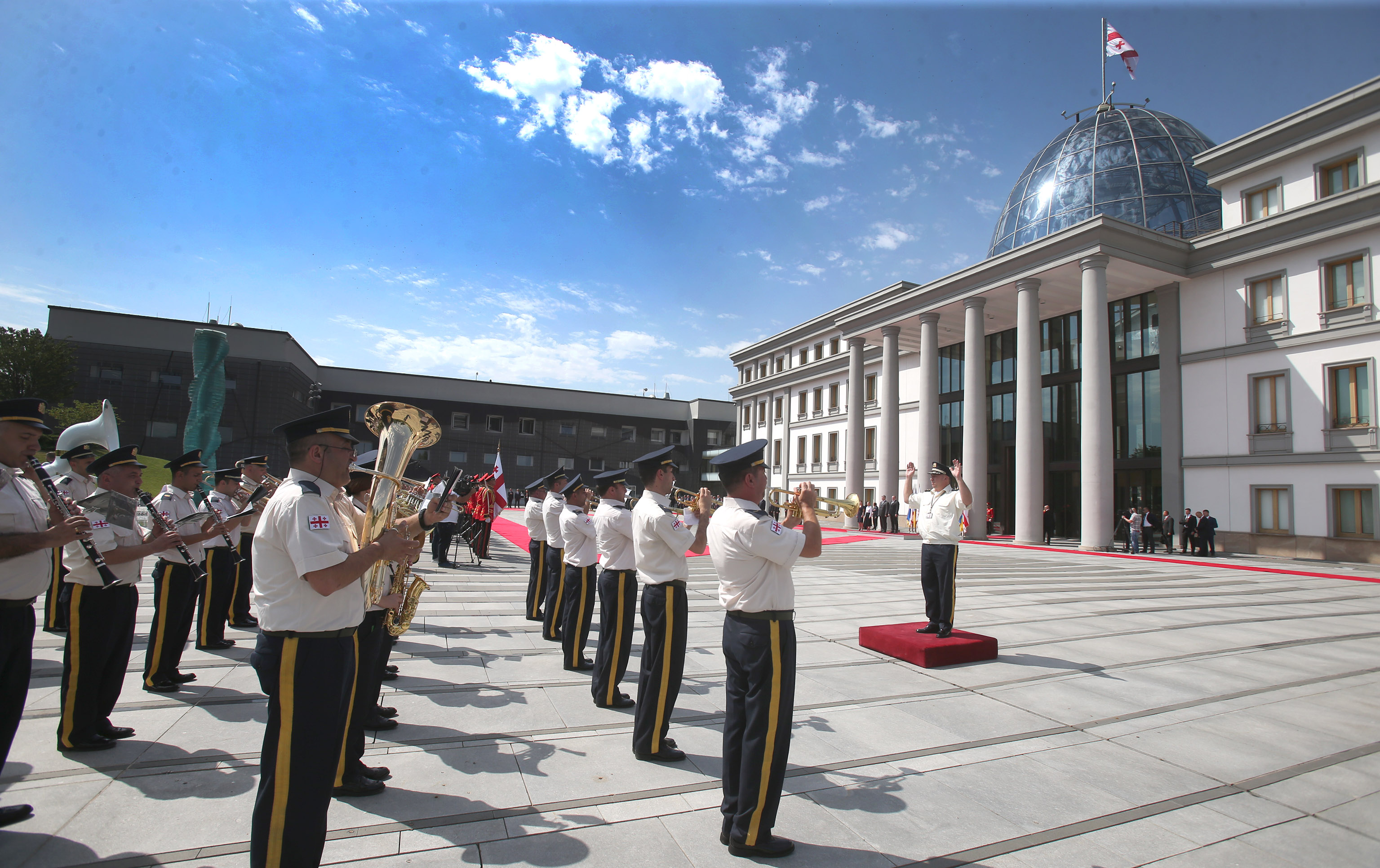
- The band during the visit of Petro Poroshenko to Tbilisi in July 2015.
- Active: 1991
- Country: Georgia
- Branch: National Guard of Georgia
- Type: Military band
- Role: Ceremonial accompaniment
- Headquarters: Tbilisi

Commanders
- Director of Music: Captain Koba Mervanishvili

The Military Band of the National Guard of Georgia (Georgian: საქართველოს ეროვნული გვარდიის ორკესტრი) is the main military band of the National Guard of Georgia, and the senior state military band of the Defense Forces of Georgia (known as the Georgian Armed Forces until December 2018).

== History ==
The history of the orchestra dates back to 1917 when musician Valerian Mizandar assembled 65 musicians in the ninth horse riding range of the Georgian Cadet Corps and created a large military brass orchestra, which had never been before. In 1918, after the declaration of independence of Georgia, it was called the People's Guards Band. It was abolished during the Soviet era and was replaced with the massed military bands of the Transcaucasian Military District. The Military Band of the National Guard of Georgia was created in 1991 with the establishment of the Georgian Armed Forces on the basis of the People's Guard Band and the HQ Band of the Transcaucasian Military District, whose personnel were absorbed by the new formation. In the beginning, its repertoire only consisted of national anthems, and military marches. Nowadays, the orchestra performs music that includes classical and contemporary music. It has participated in many international military music festivals, such as the Military Band's Festival in Riga, Latvia, the Festival of Military Bands in Muscat, Oman, the International Music Festival “Autumn Tbilisi”, and the Black Sea Jazz Festival in Batumi.

In February 2016, the Defence Ministry of Georgia announced a competition to submit the best pieces of military music to be performed by the orchestra on Georgia's Independence Day on May 26.

In June 2017, the band performed with The Salamanca Band of the Rifles of the United Kingdom during its tour of the region. On June 20, Tbiliso, which is the unofficial anthem of the City of Tbilisi, was performed by both bands. They also performed together on June 26, during a concert on a bridge in the neighborhood of Metekhi.

== See also ==
- Band of the General Staff of the Armed Forces of Armenia
- Military Band Service of the Armed Forces of Azerbaijan
