= Shota Kviraia =

Georgian security official (1952-2011)

Shota Kviraia (Georgian: შოთა კვირაია) (June 5, 1952 – January 10, 2011) was a Georgian security and police official and lieutenant-general of the state security service. A former KGB officer, he was an influential member of Eduard Shevardnadze's government in the mid-1990s.

Born in Tskhakaia (now Senaki), then-Soviet Georgia, Kviraia was educated as an engineer at the Tbilisi State Polytechnical Institute and then as a jurist at the Tbilisi State University. He joined the ranks of the Ministry of Internal Affairs of Georgia in 1977. He served as an officer in the unit for fighting corruption in Sukhumi (1977–1984) and then in Tbilisi (1984–1990). During the Georgian Civil War, he was chief of police in Zugdidi, where he was involved in combat operations against the supporters of the ousted President Zviad Gamsakhurdia. He became Minister of Internal Affairs in the government of Eduard Shevardnadze in 1993 and succeeded his rival, the disgraced Igor Giorgadze as a state security chief, now turned into a separate ministry, in 1995. He was accused by the opposition and rights groups of personally torturing prisoners, involvement in the summary execution of six men in 1993, collaboration with the Russian security services, and of telephone tapping. Eventually, in 1997, he was forced to resign. Since then he lived in Moscow. He died there, of renal failure, and was buried in Tbilisi.
