= Akaki Eliava =

Georgian military commander (1956-2000)

Akaki Eliava (Georgian: აკაკი ელიავა; 1952 – 9 July 2000) was a Georgian military officer involved in the Georgian civil war, 1993. Supporter of the ousted president Zviad Gamsakhurdia, he staged an abortive revolt against the government of Eduard Shevardnadze in 1998, and was killed in a skirmish with police in 2000.

Born in Senaki, western Georgia, he joined in 1992 the National Guard, a powerful paramilitary force large faction of which had been involved in a successful coup against President Zviad Gamsakhurdia in December 1991-January 1992. When the ousted president returned to Georgia to reclaim power in September 1993, Colonel Eliava met him with his battalion at the Zugdidi airport, and rallied Gamsakhurdia's supporters to march on the capital Tbilisi. The rebellion was, however, defeated and the ex-president died in unclear circumstances on December 31, 1993.

Eliava was arrested, but granted his amnesty in a few months, and joined the reconstructed armed forces of Georgia retaining the rank of colonel. On October 18–19, he organized a revolt at Senaki and marched on the city of Kutaisi. The mutiny collapsed, however, and Eliava and his 30 supporters hid out in the Mingrelian forests in western Georgia. Later, he demanded the resignation of President Shevardnadze. Despite the Georgian government claimed he was involved in organized crime, smuggling and Georgian mafia activities, no serious measures were undertaken to detain him. Subsequently, he was granted another amnesty in 2000. However, he was arrested in the town of Zestaponi, on July 9, 2000, and, according to an official version, shot to death when trying to take a policeman hostage.

== See also ==
- Georgia military mutiny, 1998
