= Samson Kutateladze (brigadier general) =

Georgian brigadier general and politician

- Born: 4 May 1964; Sachkhere, Georgian SSR
- Died: 15 January 2018 (aged 53); Rustavi, Georgia

Samson Tengiz Kutateladze (Georgian: სამსონ თენგიზის ძე ქუთათელაძე; 4 May 1964 – 15 January 2018) was a Georgian businessman, politician, and retired brigadier general. He was the commander of the Georgian National Guard from 2004 to 2006. He sat in the Parliament of Georgia on a United National Movement ticket from 2008 to 2012. After his retirement from politics, Kutateladze was involved in private business. He was shot dead by an unidentified assailant in the city of Rustavi on 15 January 2018.

== Biography ==
Kutateladze was born in Sachkhere, in the Georgian Soviet Socialist Republic on May 4, 1964. From 1983 to 1985, he served in the Soviet Armed Forces. In 1985, he became the Head of Radio Centre of Sachkhere Sport Complex. He was educated at Tbilisi's Economic and Law Institute, graduating in 1988. Since 1991 he has served in various positions in the Georgian Armed Forces. Until 2001, he served in the Sachkhere Battalion and has since been a member of the National Guard since. From 2004 to 2006 he was the commander of the National Guard. He participated in the 1991–1992 South Ossetia War and the War in Abkhazia (1992–1993), as well as peacekeeping operations in Iraq. He has attended military courses and exercises in the United States, France and the United Kingdom.

He was a member of the Parliament of Georgia, Deputy Chairman of the Defense and Security Committee from 2008 to 2012. He was elected to the parliament as an MP from Sachkhere Municipality from the United National Movement. He then worked in the private business sector. He was married with two children.

== Awards ==
- Georgian Orthodox Church Gold Order of St. Giorgi
- Vakhtang Gorgasal's Order-III Rank
- Medal for Military Honor
- French Legion of Honour
- Georgia National Guard Oglethorpe Distinguished Service Medal
- Army Achievement Medal
- Georgia National Guard Commendation Medal
