= February 2 massacre =

1992 pro-Zviad Gamsakhurdia protest turned violent

- Part of 1991–1992 Georgian coup d'état
- Location: Tbilisi, Georgia
- Date: February 2, 1992; 34 years ago
- Target: Pro-Gamsakhurdia demonstrators
- Deaths: 23 (unofficial)
- Injuries: At least 183 (unofficial)
- Perpetrator: Military Council
- Motive: Protest dispersal

The February 2 massacre (February 2, 1992 meeting/demonstration/rally shooting) (Georgian: ორი თებერვლის [მასობრივი] ხოცვა-ჟლეტა/2 თებერვლის მიტინგის დახვრეტა) was a pro-Zviad Gamsakhurdia protest in Tbilisi, Georgia in 1992 that was violently suppressed by the forces of the Military Council. The death toll from the massacre is estimated to range in the dozens; however, the exact number of casualties remains unknown to this day.

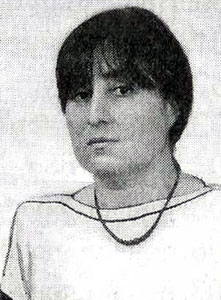
Tsitsino (Tsitso) Kevkhishvili (1946-1991) was killed by opposition fighters on December 22, 1991, in the morning, on the territory adjacent to the Supreme Council.

It is considered the bloodiest day in modern history of Georgia in terms of crackdown against peaceful protests. Following a two-week 1991–1992 Georgian coup d'état, Zviad Gamsakhurdia who had won presidential elections on 26 May 1991, was toppled on 6 January 1992 in Tbilisi. As he fled to Armenia and later to Chechnya, his supporters organized a campaign of civil disobedience with the aim of restoration of the deposed government.

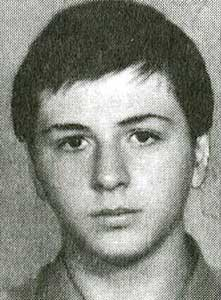
Givi Rekhviashvili was 21 years old when he was wounded on January 3, 1992, near "Didube" metro station. Several days later he died in hospital.

In the wake of his departure, spontaneous protests erupted in the capital, organized by supporters of Gamsakhurdia, referred to as "Zviadists". Several large demonstrations were violently dispersed by the interim government, led by the trio of Tengiz Kitovani, Tengiz Sigua, and Jaba Ioseliani. Among them the most notable were on 3 January 1992 near "Didube" metro station and railway tracks and 7 January 1992 near "Delisi" metro station which left several people dead after protesters were shot at by unidentified gunmen. ITN and its prominent journalist James Mates reported on these events. Also they were mentioned by Russia's Channel 1 and Germany's ARD Tagesschau unlike February 2, 1992 shootings.

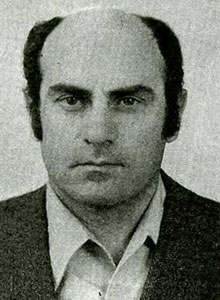
Baadur Mchedlishvili was wounded on January 7, 1992, near "Delisi" metro station and later died from blood loss.

After mass rallies held in Tbilisi on 29 and 30 January, Jaba Ioseliani returned from Samegrelo where he had been leading a military campaign against the forces loyal to Gamsakhurdia. In a TV interview, he vowed to restore order in the capital, threatening to "shoot dead every provocateur on the spot".

== Massacre ==
On February 2, 1992, tens of thousands of demonstrators gathered at Railway Station Square and began marching towards the government chancellery via Queen Tamar Avenue, chanting, "Down with the junta!" They were led by a group of activists who were using a loudspeaker to address the demonstrators with the following words, “Friends, let us walk slowly! Friends, we are not using violence as a means of struggle against anyone! Our march is a peaceful one! We struggle peacefully!“ The demonstrators continued marching and chanting slogans like, "Long live our legal president Zviad Gamsakhurdia! Georgia! Georgia!"(YouTube) As they stopped short of approaching the Tbilisi Circus, they were met by gunmen standing behind buses, trolleybuses and a fire engine blocking off access to them to Heroes' Square.

At this moment, a man with a loudspeaker started saying to the demonstrators, "Let us not touch the buses, friends! Let us not touch the buses!" while crowds were heard chanting, "Zviadi! Zviadi!" to the sound of the fire engine's motor revving up. (YouTube)

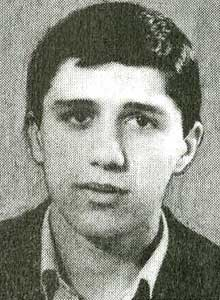
Mamuka Terishvili

According to the footage widely available on YouTube and Facebook, other gunmen were taking position on the right side hilltop opposite the Tbilisi Circus. When gunfire erupted, members of the crowd initially crouched and did not much scatter, with some crying out, "Get up! They won't kill us all!" However, as some seriously wounded people were carried off from the scene, panic prevailed among some in the crowd.

The footage also showed crowds of demonstrators, dressed in warm winter clothing, calling the armed men "fascists". But this occurred before the shooting commenced.

Also prior to the onset of the shooting, a water cannon was used against the protesters. In response the peaceful demonstrators started whistling even more than before.

And after the gunmen ceased shooting, consternation gripped the ralliers there as some of them were crying, while others were hurling curses at the perpetrators of this tragedy.

17-year-old Mamuka Terishvili carrying the national flag of Georgia in front of the peaceful people, protesting the overthrow of their legally elected president and parliament, was one of the first persons to fall at the hands of his brothers on February 2, 1992. (In Georgia, it is quite common among people to address each other as their uncle or aunt, brother or sister, etc., which depends on their age difference, even though they are not each other's relatives. Sometimes they even call their enemies brothers but mostly if they are Georgians.)

There were shootings also on Marjanishvili Square near metro station Marjanishvili, resulting in injuries. Military Commandant Gela Lanchava was allegedly in charge of the firing squads operating in the city. At least two young women were arrested on Marjanishvili Square near metro station "Marjanishvili". One of them was screaming while she was being pushed to continue to walk ahead. From time to time an armored/armoured personnel carrier was revving up its engine to intimidate ralliers already hiding in nearby buildings. Men, toting automatic rifles, also entered the metro station, but the footage doesn't show whether they arrested anyone there or not. And, at some point, an ambulance is seen receiving an injured demonstrator and driving away.

== Aftermath ==
No investigation has ever been launched into this and many other similar tragic events taking place before or after. The regime-controlled media scarcely mentioned these events, describing them as clashes. More rallies were held in Tbilisi in April and May, - though on a much smaller scale than on February 2, 1992 - but the main focus of the "new regime" was now on using forceful means, mostly in Samegrelo, where the local people overwhelmingly supported Mr.Gamsakhurdia and represented the core of his loyalists. Violence was also used against members of the new regime, for instance: a bomb attack on Mr. Ioseliani's car on 13 June 1992 and the capture of the state TV station by Walter Shurgaya (W.Shurgaya was a supporter of President Gamsakhurdia) and his armed men on June 24, 1992.

This civil war has also claimed the lives of some of the handsomest and brightest youngsters serving in the armed forces of the Military Council like Sandro (Sandrik, full first name: Alexander) Shaishmelashvili from the Sakartvelos Mkhedrioni (Georgia's Knights or Horsemen). In his diary Sandrik wrote, "Life is a knot. Before you untie it, it is already over." According to "The Georgian Republic" or "The Republic of Georgia" newspaper (გაზეთი "საქართველოს რესპუბლიკა";January 10, 1992, number 3) Sandrik was wounded by three bullets during the fighting in Tbilisi and bled to death. But his Mkhedrioni comrades claimed in the documentary "Out of the Shadows" by Stornoway Productions that he had been blown up by a dynamite so that only a piece of his shirt remained.

The civil war lasted until the end of 1993, though its repercussions continued well beyond that date. Supporters of the late president Gamsakhurdia continued to demonstrate even after Mr. Saakashvili came to power and announced a policy of reconciliation with the Zviadists.Then headed by his [Zviad Gamsakhurdia's] widow, the Zviadists protested against Mr. Bendukidze's economic reforms and various other issues.

The place where the February 2, 1992 demonstration shootings started was later turned into an "open-air brothel" where women of various nationalities would sell sex for cheap for many years to come. For many Georgians, who were in the know, the words or rather terms "circus" and cheap sex became synonymous.

== Casualties of the mass demonstration shootings in Georgia ==
  Givi (Giviko) Iagos Dze Rekhviashvili, 21 Years Old, A Student

Givi Rekhviashvili (გივი იაგოს ძე რეხვიაშვილი, Givi Iagos Dze Rekhviashvili) was a basketball player and he also went to Kutaisi Polytechnical Institute. Givi was in his graduation year at his alma mater studying at the Chemical Technological Faculty (in the USSR: the Chemico-Technological Faculty). He was 21 years old. He attended the rally on January 3, 1992, near "Didube" metro station in Tbilisi along with his brother Nugzar. Givi had lied to his mother, Jana (Janna, Zhana or Zhanna) Rekhviashvili, telling her that he and his brother were going to visit their aunt from his mother's side and instead they went to that rally where he was wounded by either a single bullet or two bullets hitting him in the wrist and in the lung. Three days later he died in hospital. Now his whole family consisting of the parents and his brother is gone. There are many different versions of what his last words were but one thing is for sure — he was a patriot of his land and fell victim to the greatest tragedy that may happen to any country, that is war, and more so, a civil war.

 Kakhaber (Kakha) Arsenadze

Kakhaber (Kakha) Arsenadze was the first to be killed on January 3, 1992, near "Didube" subway station. The footage, widely available from different news agencies and TV channels and amply used in documentaries, shows him lying in a pool of blood. Many people have mistakenly identified the person killed as Levan Taktakishvili which is not true. Medical personnel as well as volunteers later removed Kakhaber's body from the scene of the tragedy. Not much is known about him from internet sources but it can be surely said that Kakha was in his 20's. Some say he had had no intention to show up at the rally.

 Mamuka Terishvili, 17 Years Old, A School Graduate

Mamuka Terishvili was born on February 14, 1974. He was a high-school graduate preparing to sit for entrance examinations to a higher education institution. On February 2, 1992, he was just a 17-year-old youth bearing a national flag of Georgia and marching in the front row of a demonstration that was later brutally dispersed using gunfire by up to this moment still unknown opposition gunmen taking their position on a hilltop to the right from the demonstrating crowd. When the shots rang out he was among the very first to be shot down as the fatal bullet struck his carotid artery. His mother was looking for him in the rear of the crowd but found him in the front of it, already dead, identifying him by his shoes as some demonstrators were taking him away from the scene of the shooting. She has kept his blood-soaked, bloodstained shirt with a single bullet hole in it up until now. Before he left home and set off for the meeting, Mamuka told his mother:"Mom, what would happen if you sacrificed one of your sons for the Motherland?"
