= Samtredia =

Samtredia სამტრედია
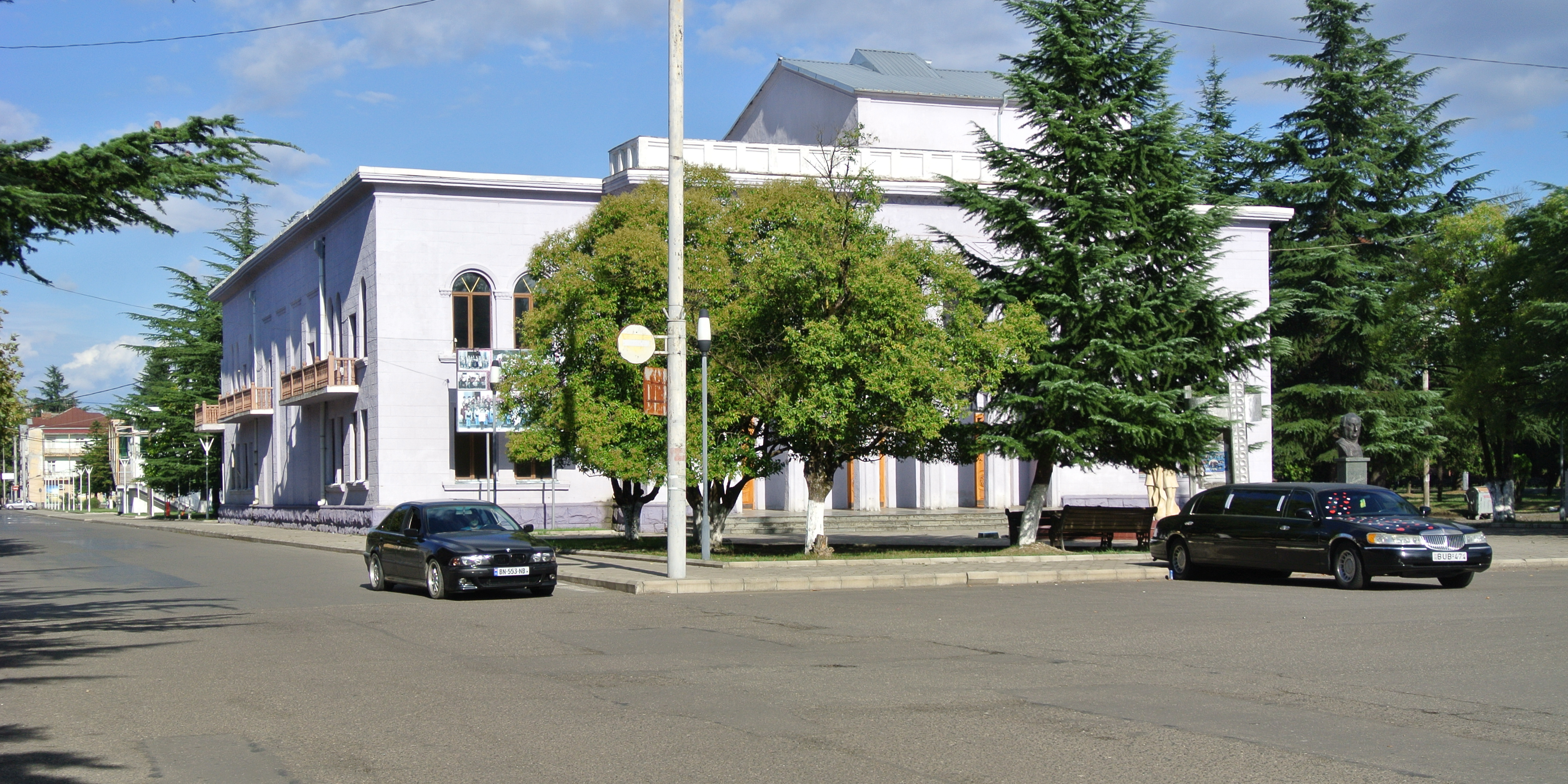
- Samtredia Theatre

- Flag Coat of arms
- Interactive map of Samtredia
- Location within Georgia Location within Imereti
- Coordinates: 42°09′45″N 42°20′30″E
- Country: Georgia (country)
- Mkhare: Imereti
- District: Samtredia
- Established: 1921
- Elevation: 25 m (82 ft)

Population (January 1, 2024)
  - Total: 21,063
- Time zone: UTC+4 (Georgian Time)
- Climate: Cfa

Samtredia (Georgian: სამტრედია [samtʼɾedia]) is a town in Imereti, Georgia, lying in a lowland between the rivers Rioni and Tskhenis-Tsqali, 244 km (152 mi) west of the capital Tbilisi, and 27 km (17 mi) west of Georgia's third largest city Kutaisi. Georgia's most important roads and railways converge there, making Samtredia the country's vital transport hub. The Kopitnari Airport is also located in 10 km (6 mi) from Samtredia. The town's population is 25,318 as of the 2014 all-Georgia census. The climate is humid subtropical, with mild and warm winters and hot summers.

== History ==
A public school in Samtredia

Samtredia evolved from a crucial railway junction in the 1870s and acquired town status in 1921. In the 1895s there was built the first school in town, 14th public school which today is known as 12th public school. Under Soviet rule, the local economy diversified from transportation to food and wood production.

Due to its strategic location, Samtredia played a prominent role in the civil unrest early in the 1990s when anti-Soviet opposition groups blocked the Samtredia junction from July 26 to 31, 1990 in order to force the Soviet Georgian leadership to adopt a liberal election code. The junction was again blocked in March–April 1991, this time by the new government of Zviad Gamsakhurdia, in an attempt to exert pressure on the central Soviet authorities. This blockade, however, inflicted heavy damage not only to the economy of Georgia but to the neighbouring Armenia, which was largely dependent on Georgia’s railways.

In 1993, Samtredia became one of the major battlegrounds in the Georgian Civil War in which the forces loyal to the ousted President Gamsakhurdia confronted the post-coup government troops, and briefly controlled the town from October 17 to October 23, 1993, putting all communications to Tbilisi under threat. Although Samtredia has been stable ever since, the post-Soviet crisis resulted in a significant economic decline that have since only been partially reversed. Samtredia had several large enterprises until the early 90s; due to the economic decline, many enterprises were destroyed.

== Geography ==
Samtredia is located in the Colchis Lowland by the Tskhenistsqali and Rioni rivers. The town is located 27 km from the city of Kutaisi, near the border of the Samegrelo-Zemo Svaneti mkhare, and 244 km from Tbilisi.

=== Climate ===
Climate data for Samtredia, 26 m asl (1971–2000 normals)
Month	Jan	Feb	Mar	Apr	May	Jun	Jul	Aug	Sep	Oct	Nov	Dec	Year
Record high °C (°F)	21.8 (71.2)	24.6 (76.3)	28.8 (83.8)	33.3 (91.9)	35.7 (96.3)	39.5 (103.1)	41.1 (106.0)	39.3 (102.7)	36.5 (97.7)	32.4 (90.3)	29.5 (85.1)	23.8 (74.8)	41.1 (106.0)
Mean daily maximum °C (°F)	9.0 (48.2)	9.7 (49.5)	14.2 (57.6)	20.7 (69.3)	23.8 (74.8)	27.4 (81.3)	28.1 (82.6)	28.7 (83.7)	26.3 (79.3)	21.9 (71.4)	15.6 (60.1)	11.0 (51.8)	19.7 (67.5)
Daily mean °C (°F)	5.7 (42.3)	6.0 (42.8)	9.6 (49.3)	14.9 (58.8)	18.1 (64.6)	22.0 (71.6)	23.7 (74.7)	23.9 (75.0)	20.9 (69.6)	16.7 (62.1)	11.5 (52.7)	7.5 (45.5)	15.0 (59.1)
Mean daily minimum °C (°F)	2.3 (36.1)	2.3 (36.1)	4.9 (40.8)	9.0 (48.2)	12.5 (54.5)	16.5 (61.7)	19.3 (66.7)	19.1 (66.4)	15.6 (60.1)	11.5 (52.7)	7.3 (45.1)	3.9 (39.0)	10.4 (50.6)
Record low °C (°F)	−11.4 (11.5)	−10.4 (13.3)	−9 (16)	−2.9 (26.8)	3.2 (37.8)	7.6 (45.7)	12.0 (53.6)	11.2 (52.2)	5.8 (42.4)	0.6 (33.1)	−2.5 (27.5)	−5.6 (21.9)	−11.4 (11.5)
Average precipitation mm (inches)	208.2 (8.20)	136.4 (5.37)	101.2 (3.98)	79.0 (3.11)	72.2 (2.84)	105.0 (4.13)	112.5 (4.43)	117.9 (4.64)	124.3 (4.89)	140.0 (5.51)	176.0 (6.93)	185.8 (7.31)	1,558.5 (61.34)
Average precipitation days (≥ 1 mm)	14.8	12.2	11.0	8.8	9.4	10.3	9.1	8.3	8.7	9.0	12.5	13.5	127.6
Source 1: Météo climat stats
Source 2: Météo Climat

== Notable people ==
- Meri Arabidze (b. 1994) – Georgian chess player
- Akaki Chachua (b. 1969) – Georgian wrestler
- Kakha Kaladze (b. 1978) – Incumbent mayor of Tbilisi, former defender of Dynamo Kyiv, A.C. Milan and Georgia national football team ex-captain.
- Solomon Kvirkvelia (b. 1992) – Georgian football player
- Andrea Razmadze (1889 – 1929) – Mathematician, co-founder of Tbilisi State University
- Jemal Tabidze (b. 1996) – Georgian footballer

== Gallery ==
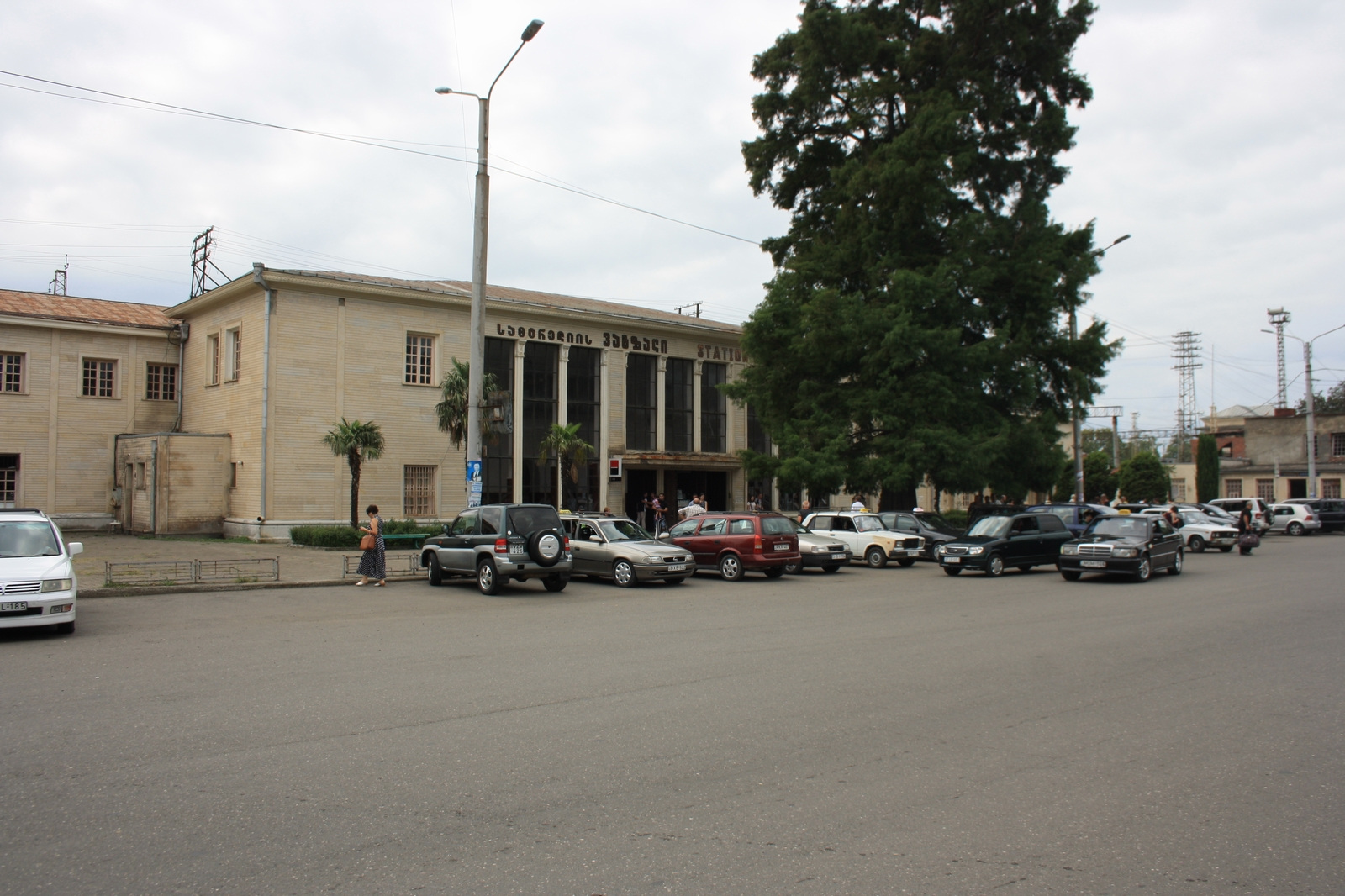
Samtredia Train Station

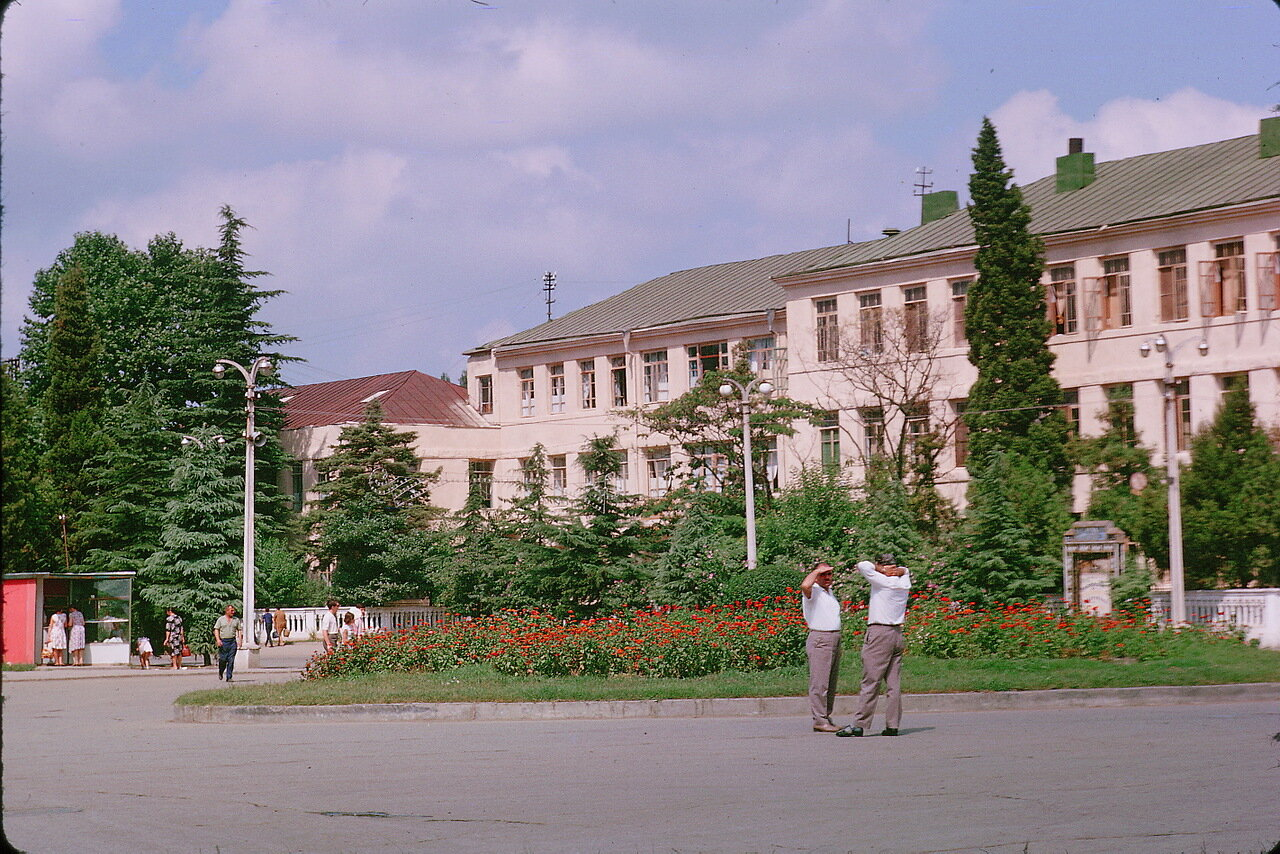
Samtredia in the 1960s

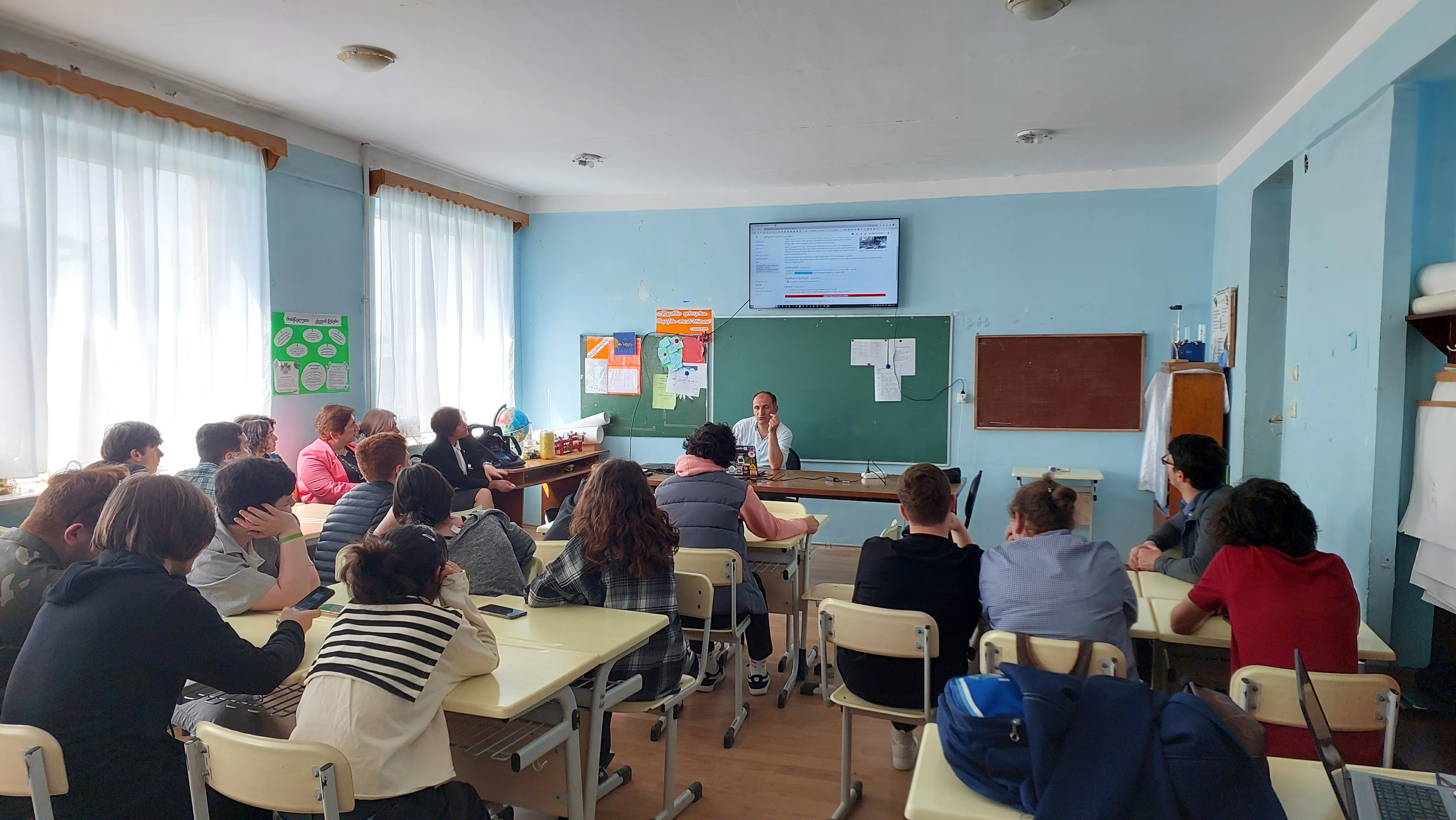
Samtredia WikiClub, 2023

== See also ==
- Imereti
