= Viktor Kostyrko =

Transnistrian politician (born 1948)

Viktor Ivanovich Kostyrko (born May 24, 1948) is the mayor of Tiraspol, the capital of the de facto independent Pridnestrovian Moldavian Republic (PMR). He was born in Komsomolsk-on-Amur and is of Ukrainian ethnicity. Originally elected in 1999, he has since been re-elected once.

Viktor Kostyrko is a political ally of the PMR's president, Igor Smirnov.
