= National Guard of Georgia =

- საქართველოს ეროვნული გვარდია
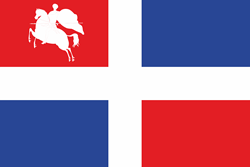
- Georgian National Guard flag and insignia
- Founded: 20 December 1990; 35 years ago
- Country: (Georgia (country)) / Georgia
- Type: Gendarmerie; Guard of honour Military reserve force
- Size: 554 primary cadre. Mobilization capacity ranging in the tens of thousands.
- Patron: Saint George
- Engagements: Georgian Civil War; Georgian-Ossetian conflict Georgian-Abkhaz conflict Russian-Georgian war

Commanders
- Current commander: Col. Irakli Chumburidze
- Notable commanders: Tengiz Kitovani; Koba Kobaladze; Samson Kutateladze; Nikoloz Janjgava

Insignia
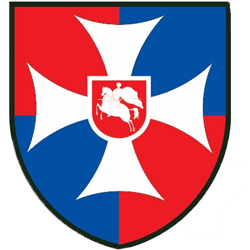
- GNG shoulder insignia

The National Guard of Georgia (GNG, Georgian: საქართველოს ეროვნული გვარდია, sak'art'velos erovnuli gvardia), also referred as the Georgian National Guard, is the gendarmerie and military reserve force branch of the Georgian Defence Forces. It is tasked with responding to civil affairs, civil disorders, external threats, important ceremonial duties, internal security, natural disasters crisis, public security, and support military operations.

== History ==
=== Establishment ===
The GNG was established on December 20, 1990 after President Zviad Gamsakhurdia ordered the creation of what is now the Defense Forces of Georgia. In January 1991, Soviet President Mikhail Gorbachev, through the chairman of the Supreme Soviet, Anatoly Lukyanov, instructed Gamsakhurdia to ban the creation of the Guard. The official newspaper of the Soviet Army, Krasnaya Zvezda, published an article mocking the National Guard entitled "Mr. Prefects and Mr. Guardsmen."

The first military parade of the guard with the participation of the First and Second Guards Brigades was held at Boris Paichadze Stadium on 30 April 1991, where for the first time after 70 years, Georgians swore allegiance to their homeland. Gamsakhurdia personally read the oath of allegiance to the guards. The parade was led by Colonel Avtandil Tskitishvili, and saw a small detachment of cavalry being paraded. Colonel Gogi Papavadze (Head of the Main Division of the National Guard) was then presented the new flag of the guard by the parade commander. This day is today commemorated as Defence Forces Day.

Tengiz Kitovani was then appointed as the head of GNG. The GNG was mainly composed of volunteers and more experienced Georgian officers who were serving in Soviet Armies at the time and returned to Georgia to serve in the newly created Georgian Land Forces. Thus, it became the first national military formation in then-Soviet Georgia which would later provide the basis for the regular armed forces.

=== Early years ===
Almost from its birth, the National Guard became directly involved in Georgian politics. In August 1991, soon after its foundation, the GNG was split between supporters of Gamsakhurdia and Kitovani. The split happened after Kitovani announced that the president was about to dissolve the National Guard. Kitovani and his supporters left the barracks and took up positions near Tbilisi. They joined Prime Minister Tengiz Sigua and the paramilitary leader Jaba Ioseliani during the Georgian Civil War which began in December 1991. The remaining parts of the GNG retained their loyalty towards Gamsakhurdia.

Units of the National Guard were a major paramilitary force to have fought in the Georgian Civil War, South Ossetian and Abkhazian conflicts in the early 1990s.

=== 21st century ===
Following US EUCOM recommendations, new roles, functions, and structure were assigned to the National Guard. As of January 2007, the National Guard of Georgia consisted of 554 veteran personnel.

== Commanders ==
- Tengiz Kitovani (1990–1992)
- Koba Kobaladze (2001–2004)
- Samson Kutateladze (2004 – February 2006)
- Akaki Bobokhidze (February–November 2006)
- Nikoloz Janjgava (18 January – December 2007)
- Levan Gamkrelidze (until 2017)
- Irakli Chumburidze (2017–present)

== Structure ==
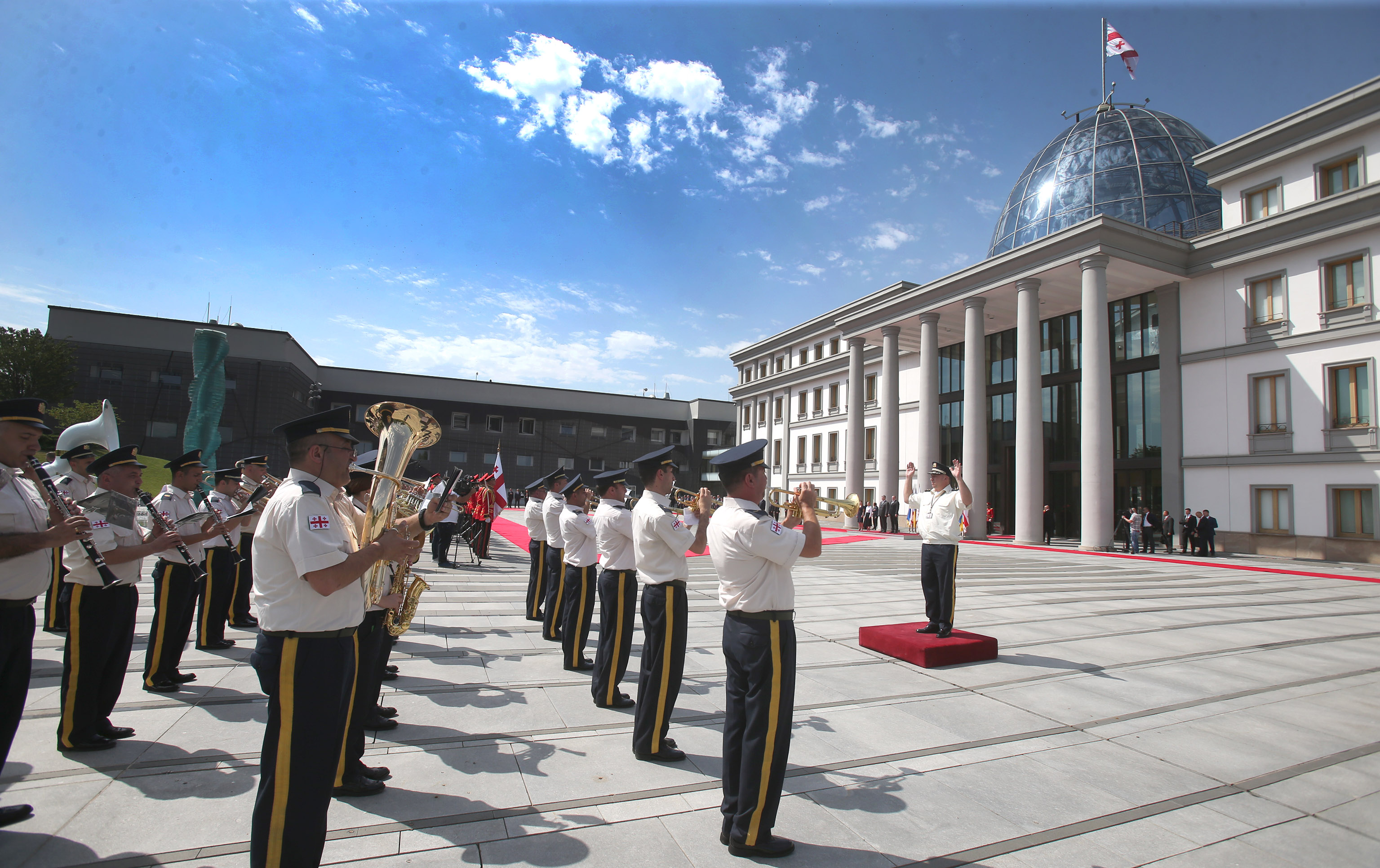
The military band.

The National Guard of Georgia is composed of:

- Headquarters of the National Guard
- Personnel Department
- Intelligence Department
- Operational Planning Department
- Logistics Department
- Strategic Planning Department
- Civil Defense Service
- Staff Company
- Security Company
- 1st Infantry Brigade (Senaki) (Reserve)
- 2nd Infantry Brigade (Telavi) (Reserve)
- Honour Guard Company
- Military Band of the National Guard

== See also ==
- Georgian Armed Forces
- National Guard
- Ministry of Defense of Georgia
- Military Band of the National Guard of Georgia
