= Georgian civil war of 1991–1993 =

1991–1993 civil war in Georgia

Georgian civil war
- Part of the post-Soviet conflicts, the Wars in the Caucasus, and the Dissolution of the Soviet Union
- Location of Georgia (including Abkhazia and South Ossetia) and the Russian part of North Caucasus
Date	December 22, 1991 – December 31, 1993 (2 years, 1 week and 2 days)
Location	Georgia (mainly in Tbilisi and Western Georgia)
Result	Pro-Shevardnadzist victory; Exile and death of the first President of Georgia, Zviad Gamsakhurdia; Georgia joins the Commonwealth of Independent States

Belligerents
(Georgia (country)) Zviadists: ----; 22 Dec 1991 – 6 Jan 1992; (Georgia (country)) Government of Georgia; National Guard of Georgia; 6 Jan 1992 – Mar 1992; (Georgia (country)) National Disobedience Committee; Mar 1992 – Sep 1993; (Georgia (country)) Gamsakhurdia's government-in-exile; Partisans; Units of the National Guard; 2 Sep 1993 – 6 Nov 1993; (Georgia (country)) Zugdidi-based government; 6 November 1993 – 31 December 1993; (Georgia (country)) Partisans; Supported by: Chechen Republic of Ichkeria	(Georgia (country)) Pro-Shevardnadzists: ----; 22 Dec 1991 – 6 Jan 1992; (Georgia (country)) Rebel factions of the National Guard; Mkhedrioni; Tetri Artsivi; Merab Kostava Society; Union of Afghans (Note: Georgians who fought for the Soviet army in Afghanistan); 2 Jan 1992 – 10 Mar 1992; (Georgia (country)) Military Council; Interim Government; 10 Mar 1992 – Oct 1992; (Georgia (country)) State Council; Interim Government; Oct 1992 – 31 Dec 1993; (Georgia (country)) Government of Georgia; Georgian Armed Forces; Internal Troops of Georgia; National Guard of Georgia; Supported by: Russia

Commanders and leaders
(Georgia (country)) Zviad Gamsakhurdia † (Georgia (country)) Loti Kobalia (Georgia (country)) Zurab Iremadze (Georgia (country)) Akaki Eliava (Chechen Republic of Ichkeria) Dzhokhar Dudayev	(Georgia (country)) Eduard Shevardnadze (Georgia (country)) Tengiz Sigua (Georgia (country)) Jaba Ioseliani (Georgia (country)) Tengiz Kitovani (Georgia (country)) Shota Kviraia (Georgia (country)) Giorgi Karkarashvili (Russia) Boris Yeltsin (Russia) Eduard Baltin

Casualties and losses
- Total deaths: Up to 2,000

The Georgian civil war of 1991–1993 (Georgian: 1991–1993 წლების ქართული სამოქალაქო ომი) lasted from 1991 to 1993 in the South Caucasian country Georgia. It began in December 1991 with the coup against the first democratically-elected President of Georgia, Zviad Gamsakhurdia, by the rebel factions of the Georgian National Guard and the Mkhedrioni paramilitary. It led to President Gamsakhurdia fleeing to neighboring Chechnya, and his subsequent insurgency and unsuccessful uprising to regain power in 1992–1993.

== Background ==
=== Georgian independence and ethnic conflicts ===
During the dissolution of the Soviet Union, an opposition movement in Georgia organized mass protests starting in 1988, culminating in a declaration of sovereignty in May 1990 and independence on April 9, 1991, which was recognized in December after the failed August Coup. Zviad Gamsakhurdia was elected President in May 1991.

Meanwhile, ethnic minority separatist movements, primarily on the part of the Ossetians and the Abkhaz, demanded secession from Georgia. A petition for a separate Abkhazian SSR was submitted to the Soviet Union in March 1989, followed by anti-Georgian riots in July. The South Ossetian Autonomous Oblast declared independence from Georgia SSR in September 1990. The crisis culminated in the First South Ossetian War breaking out in January 1991. The Georgian-Ossetian Conflict was the first major crisis faced by Gamsakhurdia's government.

=== Civil unrest ===
In August 1991, the Georgian National Guard launched a mutiny against President Zviad Gamsakhurdia and seized a government broadcast station in September. Following the police dispersion of a large opposition demonstration in Tbilisi on September 2, several opposition leaders were arrested and their offices raided and pro-opposition newspapers were closed. The National Guard of Georgia, the major paramilitary force in the country, split into two factions; pro- and anti-Gamsakhurdia, the latter being headed by the sacked National Guard commander Tengiz Kitovani. Another paramilitary organization, the Mkhedrioni, led by Jaba Ioseliani, also sided with the opposition.

Demonstrations and barricade-building marked the next three months, with sporadic clashes between pro- and anti-Gamsakhurdia forces. On September 24 a state of emergency was declared in Tbilisi. By late October 1991, most of the leadership of the opposition National Democratic Party (NDP), headed by Giorgi Chanturia, had been arrested. A stand-off followed as the anti-Gamsakhurdia factions of the National Guard withdrew to the outskirts of Tbilisi where they remained until late December 1991.

== Coup d'état ==
On 20 December 1991, Kitovani's fighters returned in force to begin the final onslaught against Gamsakhurdia. The armed opposition released Jaba Ioseliani from prison and mounted barricades in central Tbilisi. On December 22, the rebels seized several official buildings, and attacked the Parliament building where Gamsakhurdia and his supporters were holding the position. Simultaneously, the rebels, already controlling most of the city, brutally suppressed pro-Gamsakhurdia protests in and around Tbilisi. They fired on the crowds, killing and wounding several people.

On 6 January 1992, President Gamsakhurdia with other members of his government was forced to flee first to Armenia and then to Chechnya, where he led a form of government-in-exile for the next 18 months.

Within several days of the fighting, the main boulevard in the city, Rustaveli Avenue, had been destroyed, and at least 113 people were killed.

== "Zviadist" resistance ==
After the successful coup, an interim government, the Military Council, was formed in Georgia. Initially it was led by a triumvirate of Jaba Ioseliani, Tengiz Sigua and Tengiz Kitovani, but it was soon chaired by Eduard Shevardnadze, the former Georgian SSR leader and Soviet foreign minister who returned to Tbilisi in March 1992. The 1992 elections established Shevardnadze as the Chairman of Parliament and the Head of State.

Zviad Gamsakhurdia, despite his absence, continued to enjoy substantial support within Georgia, especially in rural areas and in his home region of Samegrelo in western Georgia. The pro-Gamsakhurdia forces established Samegrelo as their base and the clashes between pro- and anti-Gamsakhurdia forces continued throughout 1992 and 1993 with Zviad Gamsakhurdia's supporters taking captive government officials and government forces retaliating with reprisal raids. One of the most serious incidents occurred in Tbilisi on June 24, 1992, when armed Gamsakhurdia supporters seized the state television center. However, they were driven out within a few hours by the National Guard.

The armed "Zviadists" actually prevented the new government forces from gaining control of Gamsakhurdia's native Samegrelo region, which became the stronghold of the overthrown president's supporters. Numerous acts of violence and atrocities committed by the Mkhedrioni and government forces in this region contributed to further confrontation between the local population and Shevardnadze's regime.

Following the coup and armed clashes in western Georgia, Aslan Abashidze, the leader of southwestern autonomous province of Adjara, closed an administrative border and prevented both sides from entering Adjarian territory. This established Abashidze's authoritarian semi-separatist regime within the region, and created long-term problems in relations between the regional government and the central government of Georgia.

== The 1993 civil war ==
During the Abkhazian war, the role of Vakhtang (Loti) Kobalia's militia, the major force of the former President's supporters, continued to be controversial. Kobalia's militia fought on the Georgian side near the village of Tamish in Abkhazia and played an important role in defeating the Abkhaz-North Caucasian commandos. This step was assessed by Shevardnadze as a 'beginning of national reconciliation'. At the same time, they stirred their activities prior to the Abkhaz launching their main assault on Sokhumi. On July 9–10, 72 deputies of the former Supreme Council that had been ousted in January 1992, held a session in Zugdidi and declared the 'restoration of the legitimate government'. Broadcasting on their TV channel became more frequent. From July to August Kobalia's militia effectively solidified its control in a significant part of the Samegrelo province. On 2 September, a shadow parliament was convened by 62 deputies of the Gamsakhurdia-era Supreme Council in Zugdidi.

In September 1993, Zviad Gamsakhurdia returned to the city of Zugdidi, western Georgia, from Chechnya and rallied enthusiastic but disorganized Georgians in Samegrelo region against the demoralized and unpopular government of Eduard Shevardnadze. Although Gamsakhurdia initially represented his return as a rescue of Georgian forces after the Abkhazian disaster, his forces withdrew from Ochamchire in late September 1993.

In October 1993, the Georgian Civil War reached its climax. The advance of ex-president's forces from Samegrelo made Shevardnadze to join the Commonwealth of Independent States (CIS) and appeal for Russian military assistance. In mid-October, the addition of Russian weapons, supply-line security, and technical assistance turned the tide against Gamsakhurdia. On October 20, around 2,000 Russian troops moved to protect Georgian railroads.

On October 22, 1993, the government forces launched an offensive against pro-Gamsakhurdia rebels led by Colonel Loti Kobalia and, with the help of Russian military, occupied most of Samegrelo province. The ex-president's forces counter-attacked on October 27. Heavy fighting concentrated around the towns of Khobi and Senaki. From November 2, following an agreement between Eduard Shevardnadze and Russian leadership, a Russian marine battalion was deployed to Poti in order to secure critical transport infrastructure, including railroads and ports, from Zviadist rebels under the direction of Admiral Eduard Baltin, commander of the Black Sea Fleet. In order to obtain this support, Shevardnadze had to agree to Georgian accession to CIS and the establishment of Russian military installations within Georgia. On November 4, 1993, the government forces broke through the defence lines of the Zviadist militias and entered Zugdidi without fighting on November 6. Their troops moved to the Enguri river by 9 November. Zviad Gamsakhurdia and his bodyguards escaped to the forests chased by the government forces. He died in late December under controversial circumstances. It was later reported that Gamsakhurdia had shot himself (though unproven, with many errors in the original investigation) on December 31, in a village Jikhashkari (Samegrelo region of Western Georgia). The revolt was crushed and the region was overrun by the pro-governmental paramilitaries. Several Zviadist leaders were arrested in the following years.

== Aftermath ==
The three-year civil war produced a decade of political instability, permanent financial, economic and social crises. The situation began to stabilize in 1995. However, radical "Zviadists" organized several acts of terrorism and sabotage. They were charged for the assassination attempt of President Eduard Shevardnadze on 9 February 1998. A few days later, supporters of the former president kidnapped four observers from the United Nations Observer Mission in Georgia from their compound in Zugdidi in western Georgia. Some of the hostage takers surrendered, but Gocha Esebua, the leader of the Zviadist team, escaped and was killed in a shootout with police on 31 March.

On October 18, 1998, there was an attempted revolt led by Colonel Akaki Eliava, a former Zviadist officer, near Kutaisi, Georgia's second largest city. After the collapse of the mutiny, Eliava and his followers hid in the forests of Samegrelo. He had produced constant problems for the government until he was shot by security officers in 2000.

On January 26, 2004, the newly elected President Mikheil Saakashvili officially rehabilitated Gamsakhurdia to resolve the lingering political effects of his overthrow in an effort to "put an end to disunity in our society", as Saakashvili put it. He also released 32 Gamsakhurdia supporters arrested by Shevardnadze's government in 1993–1994.

== See also ==
- 1998 Georgian attempted mutiny
- Abkhaz–Georgian conflict
- Georgian–Ossetian conflict
- History of Georgia
- Russo-Georgian War
