= Davit Tserediani =

- დავით წერედიანი
- Born: August 19, 1937; Kolobani, Georgian SSR, Soviet Union
- Died: December 30, 2019 (aged 82); Tbilisi, Georgia
- Education: Tbilisi State University
- Occupations: Poet, translator, philologist

Davit Tserediani (Georgian: დავით წერედიანი) was a Georgian poet, translator, and philologist.

== Biography ==
Davit Tserediani was born on 19 August 1937 in the village of Kolobani. He graduated from Tbilisi State University Faculty of Philology in 1960. Since 1963, he worked at the Shota Rustaveli Institute of Literature.

Since 1981, he has been engaged in translation activities. Translations of François Villon's "Le grand testament" and "Le Petit Testament", as well as the Grimm's Fairy Tales and Johann Wolfgang Goethe's "Faust" are especially famous.

In 2012, 2014 and 2018, he received the "Saba" literary prize. In 2017, the Goethe-Institut and DVV International awarded Davit Tserediani with the Givi Margvelashvili Prize.
