= List of villages in Abasha =

The Abasha Municipality is in the Samegrelo-Zemo Svaneti Region. It contains 35 villages, and according to the 2014 census, has a population of 22,341. It covers an area of 322 square kilometers. Most villages are located in the eastern part, while the Abasha Municipality itself is situated in the center.

== List ==
| Village | Population (2014) |
|---|---|
| Marani | 1153 |
| Sujuna | 1117 |
| Sepieti | 877 |
| Dzveli Abasha | 859 |
| Maidani | 707 |
| Gamoghma Zanati | 691 |
| Pirveli Maisi | 661 |
| Maranchala | 631 |
| Etseri | 629 |
| Ontopo | 621 |
| Norio | 614 |
| Matskhovriskari | 614 |
| Kolobani | 600 |
| Naesakovo | 575 |
| Tskemi | 575 |
| Samiqao | 549 |
| Tkviri | 524 |
| Gaghma Zanati | 507 |
| Sagvazavo | 445 |
| Gautskinari | 438 |
| Tsilori | 398 |
| Gamoghma Kodori | 379 |
| Ketilari | 377 |
| Gezati | 337 |
| Bulvani | 337 |
| Guleikari | 321 |
| Gulukheti | 318 |
| Abashispiri | 262 |
| Gaghma Kodori | 259 |
| Tkhmelari | 253 |
| Sabokuchavo | 223 |
| Gugunakhati | 160 |
| Dziguri | 151 |
| Tsalikari | 122 |
| Kvishanchala | 116 |
