= Kolobani =

- Location within Samegrelo-Zemo Svaneti Location within Georgia
- Region: Samegrelo-Zemo Svaneti
- Elevation: 25 m (82 ft)

Population (2014)
  - Total: 600
- Time zone: UTC+4 (GET)
- Area code: +995

Kolobani (Georgian:ქოლობანი) is a village in Georgia, Samegrelo-Zemo Svaneti, in the municipality of Abasha.

== Geography ==
The village is situated in the east of Abasha, near Gezati, Gugunaqati, Bulvani and Maranchala. The village is also near the Tskhenistsqali River, Noghela River and the Rioni River.

== Plans ==
In 2019, a new bridge was completed on the local road connecting Kolobani and Tqviri, replacing the one that collapsed in 2018.

In July 2020, asphalt paving began on a nearly 4 kilometer road between Kolobani and Gezati.

== School ==
The Kolobani Public School has 120 students and 22 teachers. The principal of the school is Natia Kapanadze. In the school, children study in one single building with three floors, the first grade to the twelfth.

== Population ==
Year	Population
2002	747
2014	600

Source: citypopulation
