= History of Georgia (country) =

The nation of Georgia was first unified as a kingdom under the Bagrationi dynasty in 1008 AD, arising from several successor states of the ancient kingdoms of Colchis and Iberia. The Kingdom of Georgia flourished during the 11th and 12th centuries under King David IV of Georgia and Queen Tamar the Great. It fell to the Mongol invasion by 1243 but saw restoration of its former strength under the leadership of George V the Brilliant. Throughout the Middle Ages, Georgia was one of the preeminent powers of the Eastern Orthodox world, though its feudal political system more closely mirrored that of Western Europe.

Facing relentless invasions from much larger empires, by 1490 Georgia finally collapsed into several petty kingdoms and principalities, which throughout the Early Modern period feuded with one another and struggled to defend themselves against external threats, such as Ottoman and Persian encroachment. This prompted Georgian monarchs to increasingly seek an alliance with the Russian Empire, their Orthodox Christian neighbor to the north, culminating in the annexation of Georgia by the Russian Empire beginning in 1801.

Following the Russian Revolution of 1917, Georgia emerged as an independent republic under German protection. However, this was cut short by Russia's violation of the Treaty of Moscow and the Red Army invasion of Georgia, which ended the country's sovereignty and transformed it into a Soviet Republic until the dissolution of the Soviet Union. The current republic of Georgia has been independent since 1991. For much of the 21st century, Georgia pursued a strongly pro-Western foreign policy, introducing a series of reforms aimed at integration into the European Union and NATO. This Western orientation led to worsening relations with Russia, culminating in the Russo-Georgian War.

== Prehistoric period ==
Evidence for the earliest occupation of the territory of present-day Georgia goes back to c. 1.8 million years ago, as evident from the excavations of Dmanisi in the southeastern part of the country. This is the oldest evidence of humans anywhere in the world outside Africa. Later prehistoric remains (Acheulian, Mousterian, and the Upper Palaeolithic) are known from numerous cave and open-air sites in Georgia. The earliest agricultural Neolithic occupation dates between 6000 and 5000 BC. known as the Shulaveri-Shomu culture, where people used local obsidian for tools, raised animals such as cattle and pigs, and grew crops, including grapes.

Numerous excavations in tell settlements of the Shulaveri-Shomu type have been conducted since the 1960s.

Early metallurgy started in Georgia during the 6th millennium BC, associated with the Shulaveri-Shomu culture. From the beginning of the 4th millennium, metals became used to a larger extent in East Georgia and the whole Transcaucasian region.

Kingdom of Diauehi.

Diauehi, a tribal union of early-Georgians, first appear in written history in the 12th century BC. Archaeological finds and references in ancient sources reveal elements of early political and state formations characterized by advanced metallurgy and goldsmith techniques that date back to the 7th century BC and beyond. Between 2100 and 750 BC, the area survived the invasions by the Hittites, Urartians, Medes, Proto-Persians and Cimmerians. During the same period, the ethnic unity of Proto-Kartvelians broke up into several branches, among them Svans, Zans/Chans, and East-Kartvelians. That finally led to the formation of modern Kartvelian languages: Georgian (originating from East Kartvelian vernaculars), Svan, Megrelian and Laz (the latter two originating from Zan dialects). By that time Svans were dominant in modern Svaneti and Abkhazia, Zans inhabited the modern Georgian province of Samegrelo, while East-Kartvelians formed the majority in modern eastern Georgia. As a result of cultural and geographic delimitation, two core areas of future Georgian culture and statehood formed in western and eastern Georgia by the end of the 8th century BC. The first two Georgian states emerged in the west known as the Kingdom of Colchis and in the east the Kingdom of Iberia.

== Antiquity ==
=== Early Georgian kingdoms of Colchis and Iberia ===
Early Georgian states of Colchis and Iberia.

A second Georgian tribal union emerged on the Black Sea coast in the 13th century BC under the Kingdom of Colchis in western Georgia. The kingdom of Colchis, which existed from the 6th to the 1st centuries BC is regarded as the first early Georgian state formation and the term Colchians was used as the collective term for early Georgian-Kartvelian tribes such as Mingrelians, Lazs, and Chans who populated the eastern coast of the Black Sea..

According to the scholar of the Caucasian studies Cyril Toumanoff:

Colchis appears as the first Caucasian State to have achieved the coalescence of the newcomer, Colchis can be justly regarded as not a proto-Georgian, but a Georgian (West Georgian) kingdom....It would seem natural to seek the beginnings of Georgian social history in Colchis, the earliest Georgian formation.

The ancient Greeks knew of Colchis, and it featured in the Greek legend of Jason and the Argonauts, who travelled there in search of the Golden Fleece. Starting around 2000 BC, northwestern Colchis was inhabited by the Svan and Zan peoples of the Kartvelian tribes. Another important ethnic element of ancient Colchis were Greeks who between 1000 and 550 BC established many trading colonies in the coastal area, among them Naessus, Pityus, Dioscurias (modern Sokhumi), Guenos, Phasis (modern Poti), Apsaros, and Rhizos (modern Rize in Turkey). In the eastern part of Georgia, there was a struggle for the leadership among the various Georgian confederations during the 6th–4th centuries BC, which was finally won by the Kartlian tribes from the region of Mtskheta. According to the Georgian tradition, the Kingdom of Kartli (known as Iberia in the Greek-Roman literature) was founded around 300 BC by Parnavaz I, the first ruler of the Parnavazid dynasty.

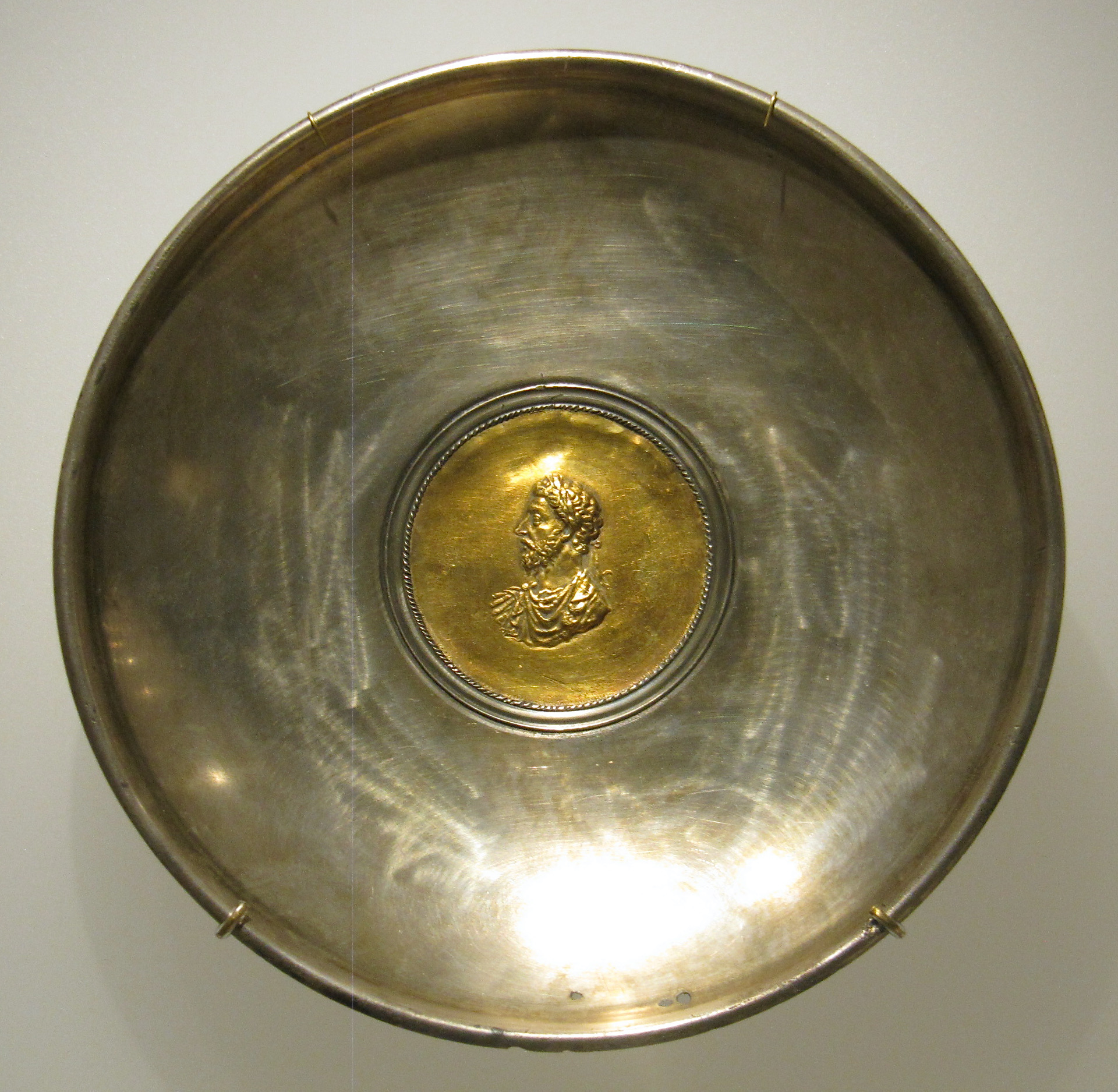
Patera depicting Marcus Aurelius uncovered in central Georgia, 2nd century AD.

Between 653 and 333 BC, both Colchis and Iberia survived successive invasions by the Iranian Median Empire. The case is different for the Achaemenid Persians however. According to Herodotus (3.97), Achaemenid power extended as far as the Caucasus mountains, but the Colchians are not included in his list of the twenty Persian satrapies. Nor are they referred to in the lists of Achaemenid lands (dahyāva) given in the Old Persian inscriptions of Darius and his successors. In Xenophon's Anabasis (7.8.25; probably an interpolation) the tribes of Colchis and East Pontus are referred to as independent (autónomoi). On the other hand, Herodotus mentioned both the Colchians and various Pontic tribes in his catalogue (7.78–79) of approximately fifty-seven peoples who participated in Xerxes' expedition against Greece in 481–80 BC. As the Encyclopaedia Iranica states, it is thus probable that the Achaemenids never succeeded in asserting effective rule over Colchis, though local tribal leaders seem to have acknowledged some kind of Persian suzerainty. The Encyclopædia Iranica further states, whereas the adjoining Pontic tribes of the nineteenth satrapy and the Armenians of the thirteenth are mentioned as having paid tribute to Persia, the Colchians and their Caucasian neighbors are not; they had, however, undertaken to send gifts (100 boys and 100 girls) every five years (Herodotus 3.97).

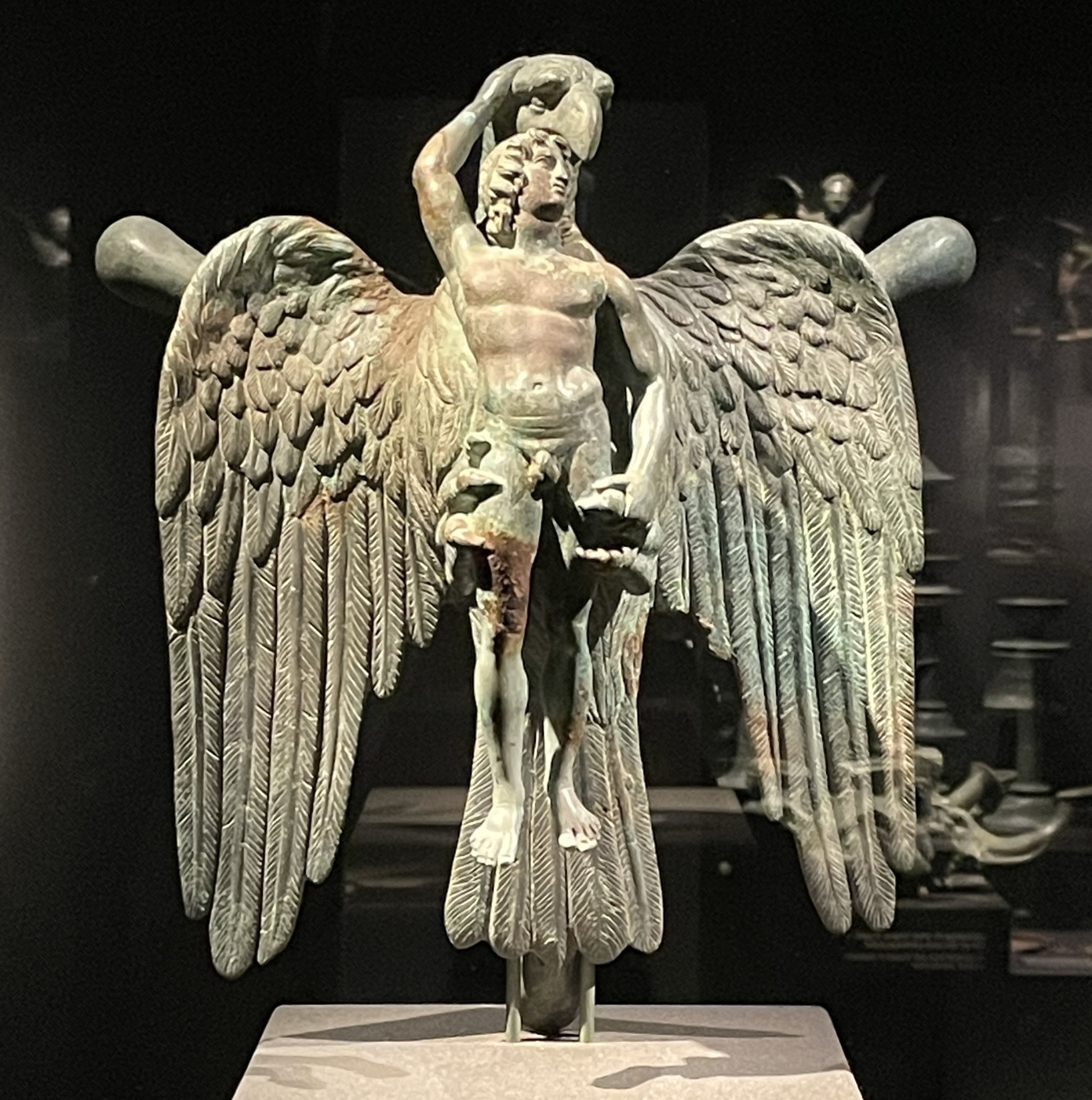
Bronze lamp featuring Zeus and Ganymede from western Georgia, c. 3rd century BC, Georgian National Museum

At the end of the 4th century BC, southern Iberia witnessed the invading armies of Alexander the Great, who established a vast Greco-Macedonian empire to the south of the Caucasus. Neither Iberia nor Colchis was incorporated into the empire of Alexander or any of the successor Hellenistic states of the Middle East. However, the culture of ancient Greece still had a considerable influence on the region, and Greek was widely spoken in the cities of Colchis. In Iberia Greek influence was less noticeable and Aramaic was widely spoken.

Between the early 2nd century BC and the late 2nd century AD both Colchis and Iberia, together with the neighboring countries, became an arena of long and devastating conflicts between major and local powers such as Rome, Armenia and the short-lived Kingdom of Pontus. Pompey's campaign in 66–65 BC annexed Armenia and then he headed north along the Kura river and then west down the Rioni river to the Black Sea. In 189 BC, the rapidly growing Kingdom of Armenia took over more than half of Iberia, conquering the southern and southeastern provinces of Gogarene, Taokhia and Heniochia, as well as some other territories. Between 120 and 63 BC, Armenia's ally Mithridate VI Eupator of Pontus conquered all of Colchis and incorporated it into his kingdom, embracing almost all of Asia Minor as well as the eastern and northern Black Sea coastal areas.

=== The Roman–Persian rivalry and the Roman conquest of Colchis ===
Kingdom of Lazica.

This close association with Armenia brought upon the country an invasion (65 BC) by the Roman general Pompey, who was then at war with Mithradates VI of Pontus, and Armenia. Still, Rome did not establish permanent power over Iberia. Twenty-nine years later (36 BC), the Romans again marched on Iberia forcing King Pharnavaz II to join their campaign against Caucasian Albania.

The former Kingdom of Colchis became the Roman province of Lazicum ruled by Roman legati. Struggles between Rome and neighboring Persia marked the following 600 years of Georgian history. While the Georgian kingdom of Colchis was administered as a Roman province, Caucasian Iberia freely accepted the Roman Imperial protection. A stone inscription discovered at Mtskheta speaks of the 1st-century ruler Mihdrat I (AD 58–106) as "the friend of the Caesars" and the king "of the Roman-loving Iberians." Emperor Vespasian fortified the ancient Mtskheta site of Armazi for the Iberian kings in 75 AD.

In the 2nd century AD, Iberia strengthened her position in the area, especially during the reign of King Pharsman II who achieved full independence from Rome and reconquered some of the previously lost territories from declining Armenia. In the early 3rd century, Rome had to give up Albania and most of Armenia to Sassanid Persia. The province of Lazicum was given a degree of autonomy that by the end of the century developed into full independence with the formation of a new Kingdom of Lazica-Egrisi on the territories of smaller principalities of the Zans, Svans, Apsilaes, and Sanigs. This new Western Georgian state survived more than 250 years until 562 when it was absorbed by the Byzantine Empire.

In the 3rd century AD, the Lazi tribe came to dominate most of Colchis, establishing the kingdom of Lazica, locally known as Egrisi. Colchis was a scene of the protracted rivalry between the Eastern Roman/Byzantine and Sassanid empires, culminating in the Lazic War from 542 to 562.

=== Adoption of Christianity as state religion ===
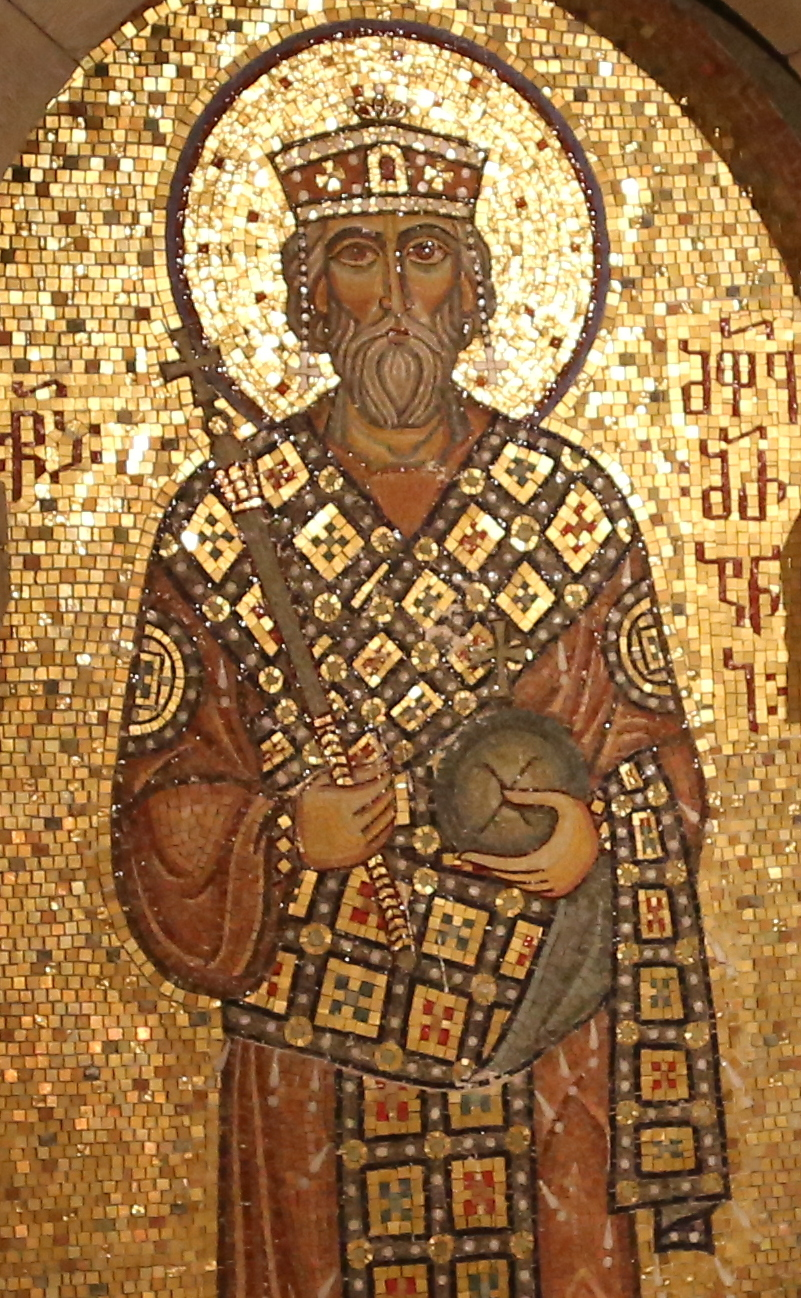
King Mirian III established Christianity in Georgia as the official state religion in 324.

Before Christianization, the cult of Mithras and Zoroastrianism were commonly practiced in Iberia from the 1st century. The cult of Mithras, distinguished by its syncretic character and thus complementary to local cults, especially the cult of the Sun, gradually came to merge with ancient Georgian beliefs. The eastern Georgian Kingdom of Iberia became one of the first states in the world to convert to Christianity in 327, when the King of Iberia Mirian III established it as the official state religion. However, the date varies based on numerous accounts and historical documents, which indicate Iberia adopting Christianity as a state religion in 317, 319, 324, 330 etc. According to The Georgian Chronicles, St. Nino of Cappadocia converted Georgia to Christianity in 330 during the time of Constantine the Great. By the middle of the 4th century though, both Lazica (formerly the Kingdom of Colchis) and Iberia adopted Christianity as their official religion. This adoption of Christianity tied the kingdom to the Byzantine Empire, which exerted strong cultural influence over it.

However, after the emperor Julian was slain during his failed campaign in Persia in 363, Rome ceded control of Iberia to Persia, and King Varaz-Bakur I (Asphagur) (363–365) became a Persian vassal, an outcome confirmed by the Peace of Acilisene in 387. However, a later ruler of Kartli, Pharsman IV (406–409), preserved his country's autonomy and ceased to pay tribute to Persia. Persia prevailed, and Sassanian kings began to appoint a viceroy (pitiaxae/bidaxae) to keep watch on their vassal. They eventually made the office hereditary in the ruling house of Lower Kartli, thus inaugurating the Kartli pitiaxate, which brought an extensive territory under its control. Although it remained a part of the kingdom of Kartli, its viceroys turned their domain into a center of Persian influence. Sasanian rulers put the Christianity of the Georgians to a severe test. They promoted the teachings of Zoroaster, and by the middle of the 5th century Zoroastrianism had become a second official religion in eastern Georgia alongside Christianity.

During the 4th and most of the 5th centuries, Iberia (known also as the Kingdom of Kartli) was under Persian control. At the end of the 5th century though, Prince Vakhtang I Gorgasali orchestrated an anti-Persian uprising and restored Iberian statehood, proclaiming himself the King. After this, the armies of Vakhtang launched several campaigns against both Persia and the Byzantine Empire, but his struggle for the independence and unity of the Georgian state did not have lasting success. After Vakhtang's death in 502, and the short reign of his son Dachi (502–514), Iberia was reincorporated into Persia and ruled by a marzpan (governor), who in Georgian were called erismtavari. The Iberian nobility were granted the privilege of electing the governors. Georgian nobles urged the Byzantine emperor Maurice to revive the kingdom of Iberia in 582, but in 591 Byzantium and Persia decisively agreed to divide Iberia between them, with Tbilisi to be in Persian hands and Mtskheta to be under Byzantine control. However, by the late 7th century, the Byzantine-Persian rivalry had given way to Arab conquest of the region.

== Medieval Georgia ==
=== Unification of the Georgian state ===
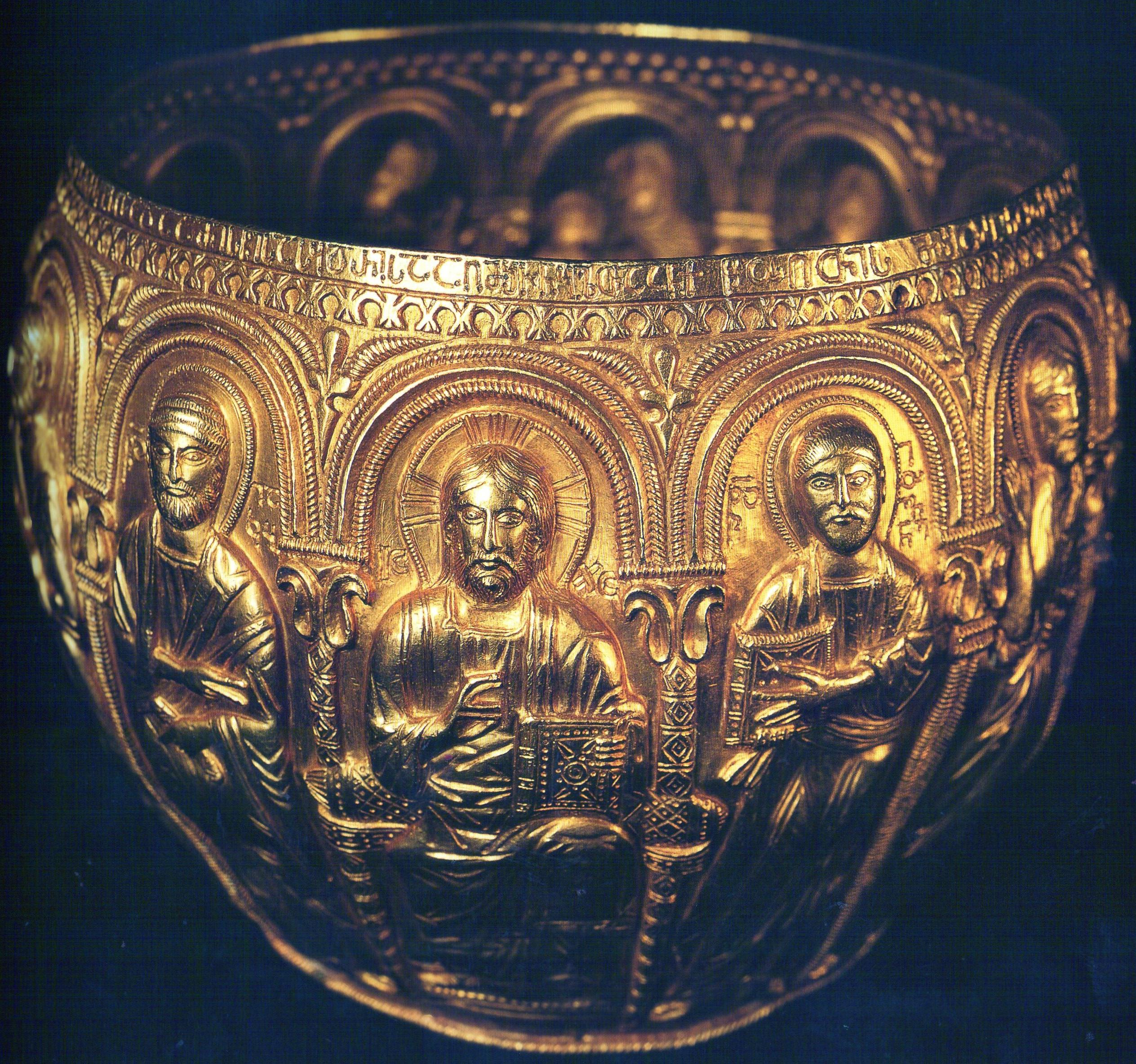
Bedia Cup of King Bagrat III of Georgia, 999 AD

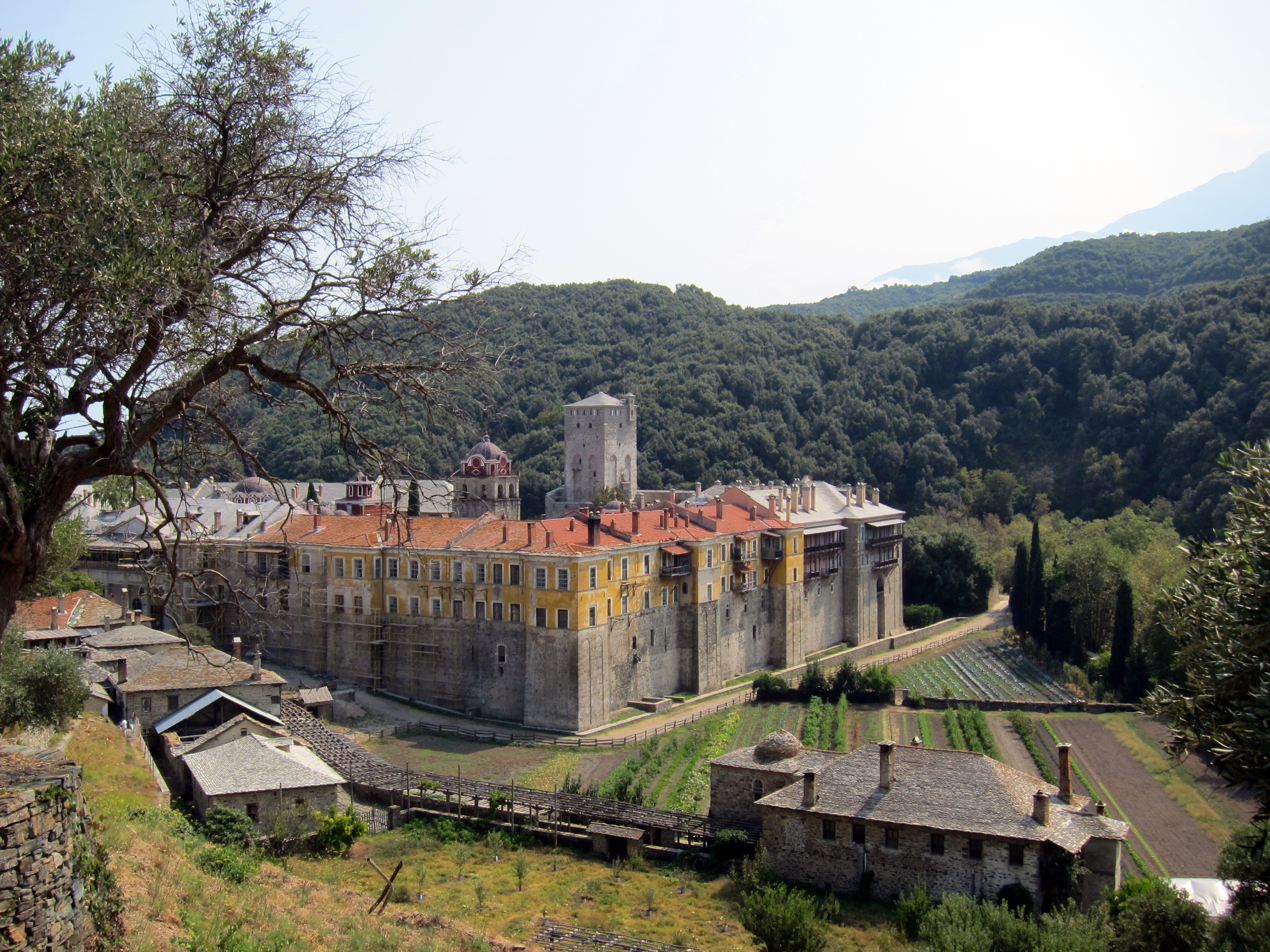
Monastery of Iviron, one of several monastic centers founded abroad by Georgians of the Early Middle Ages.

In the struggle against the Arab occupation, the Bagrationi dynasty came to rule over Tao-Klarjeti and established Kouropalatate of Iberia as a nominal dependency under the Byzantine Empire. The restoration of the Georgian kingship begins in AD 888, when Adarnase IV took the title of "King of Iberians". However, the Bagrationi dynasty failed to maintain the integrity of their kingdom which was actually divided between the three branches of the family with the main branch retaining Tao and another controlling Klarjeti. At the end of the 10th century Curopalate David of Tao invaded the Earldom of Iberia (Kartli) and gave it to his foster-son Bagrat III and installed Gurgen as his regent, who was later crowned as "King of Kings of the Iberians" on the death of Bagrat the Simple (994). Through his fortunate bloodlines Bagrat was destined to sit upon two thrones. Furthermore, through his mother Gurandukht, sister of the childless Abkhazian king Theodosius III, Bagrat was a potential heir to the realm of Abkhazia. Three years later, after the death of Theodosius III, Bagrat III inherited the Abkhazian throne. In 1008, Gurgen died, and Bagrat succeeded him as "King of the Iberians", becoming thus the first King of a unified realm of Abkhazia and Iberia. After he had secured his patrimony, Bagrat proceeded to press a claim to the easternmost Georgian kingdom of Kakheti-Hereti and annexed it in or around 1010, after two years of fighting and aggressive diplomacy. Bagrat's reign, a period of uttermost importance in the history of Georgia, brought about the final victory of the Georgian Bagratids in the centuries-long power struggles. Anxious to create more stable and centralized monarchy, Bagrat eliminated or at least diminished the autonomy of the dynastic princes. In his eyes, the most possible internal danger came from the Klarjeti line of the Bagrationi. Although seem to have acknowledged Bagrat's authority, they continued to be styled as Kings, and Sovereigns of Klarjeti. To secure the succession to his son, George I, Bagrat lured his cousins, on pretext of a reconciliatory meeting, to the Panaskerti Castle, and threw them in prison in 1010. Bagrat's foreign policy was generally peaceful and the king successfully maneuvered to avoid the conflicts with both the Byzantine and Muslim neighbors even though David's domains of Tao remained in the Byzantine and Tbilisi in the Arab hands.

=== Between Seljuks and Byzantines ===
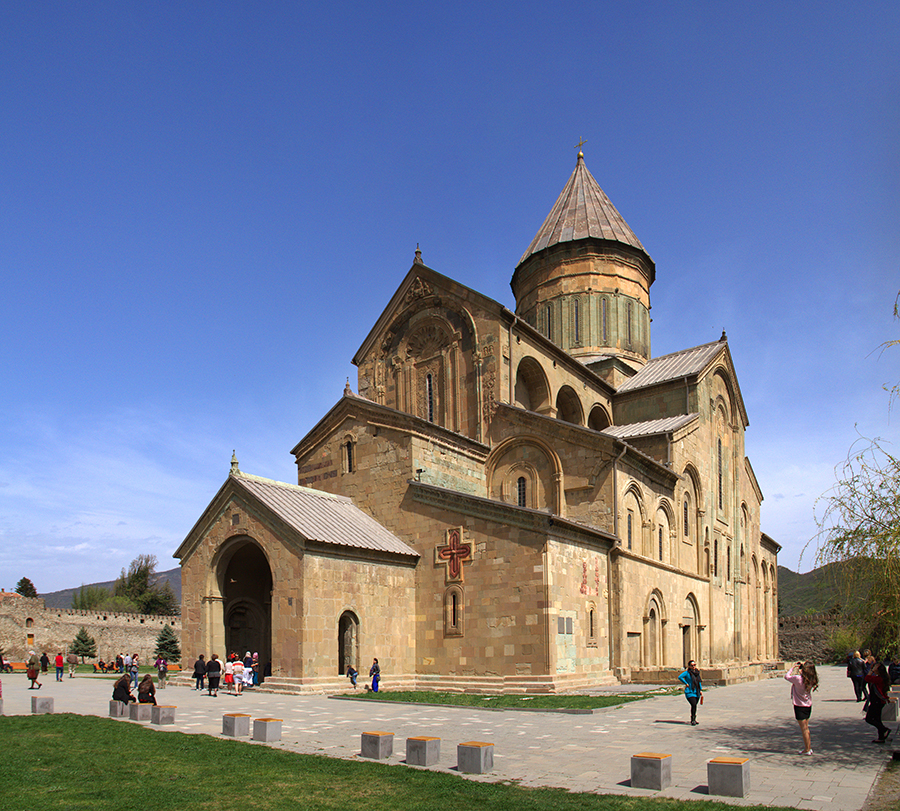
The construction of Svetitskhoveli Cathedral in Mtskheta, now a UNESCO World Heritage Site, was initiated in the 1020s by George I.

The major political and military event during George I’s reign, a war against the Byzantine Empire, had its roots back to the 990s, when the Georgian prince Curopalate David of Tao, following his abortive rebellion against Emperor Basil II, had to agree to cede his extensive possessions in Tao and the neighboring lands to the emperor on his death. All the efforts by David's stepson and George's father, Bagrat III, to prevent these territories from being annexed to the empire went in vain. Young and ambitious, George launched a campaign to restore the Kuropalates’ succession to Georgia and occupied Tao in 1015–1016. Byzantines were at that time involved in a relentless war with the Bulgarian Empire, limiting their actions to the west. But as soon as Bulgaria was conquered, Basil II led his army against Georgia (1021). An exhausting war lasted for two years, and ended in a decisive Byzantine victory, forcing George to agree to a peace treaty, in which he had not only to abandon his claims to Tao, but to surrender several of his southwestern possessions to Basil, and to give his three-year-old son, Bagrat IV, as hostage.

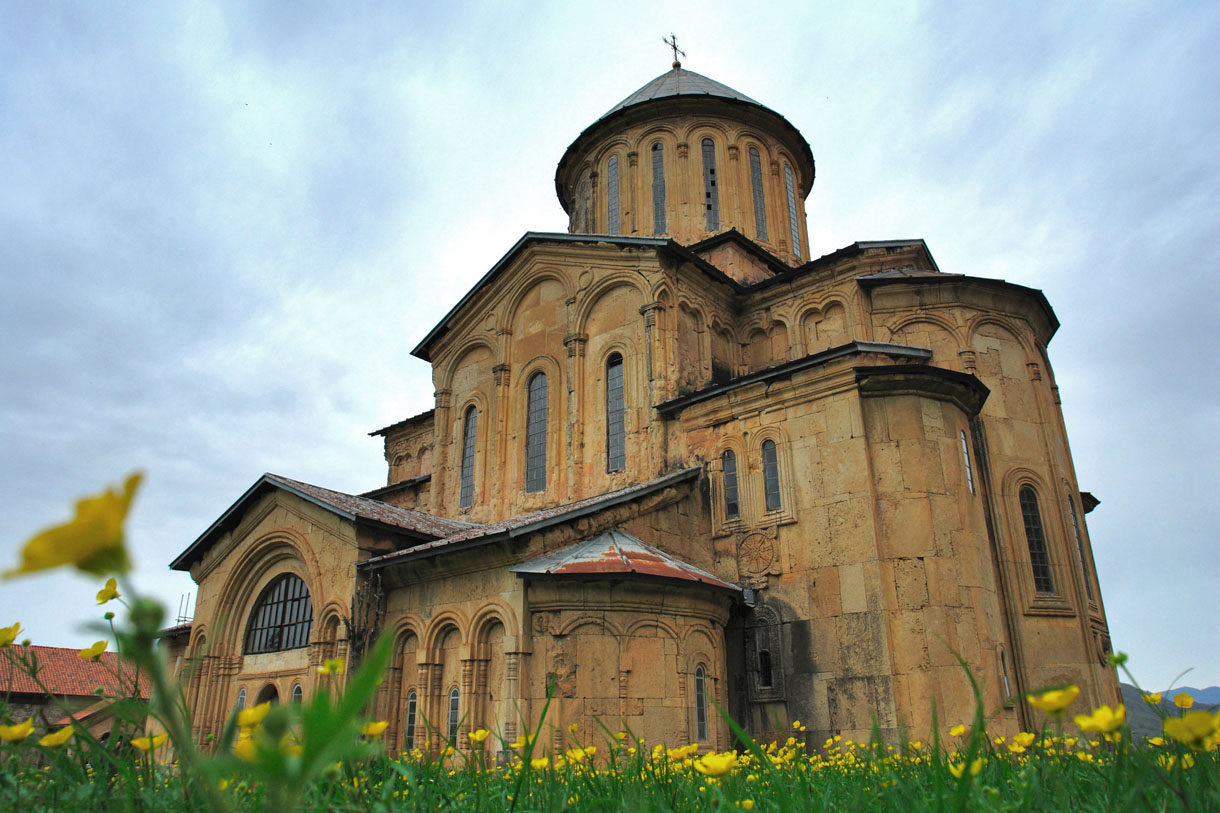
Gelati Monastery, a UNESCO World Heritage Site.

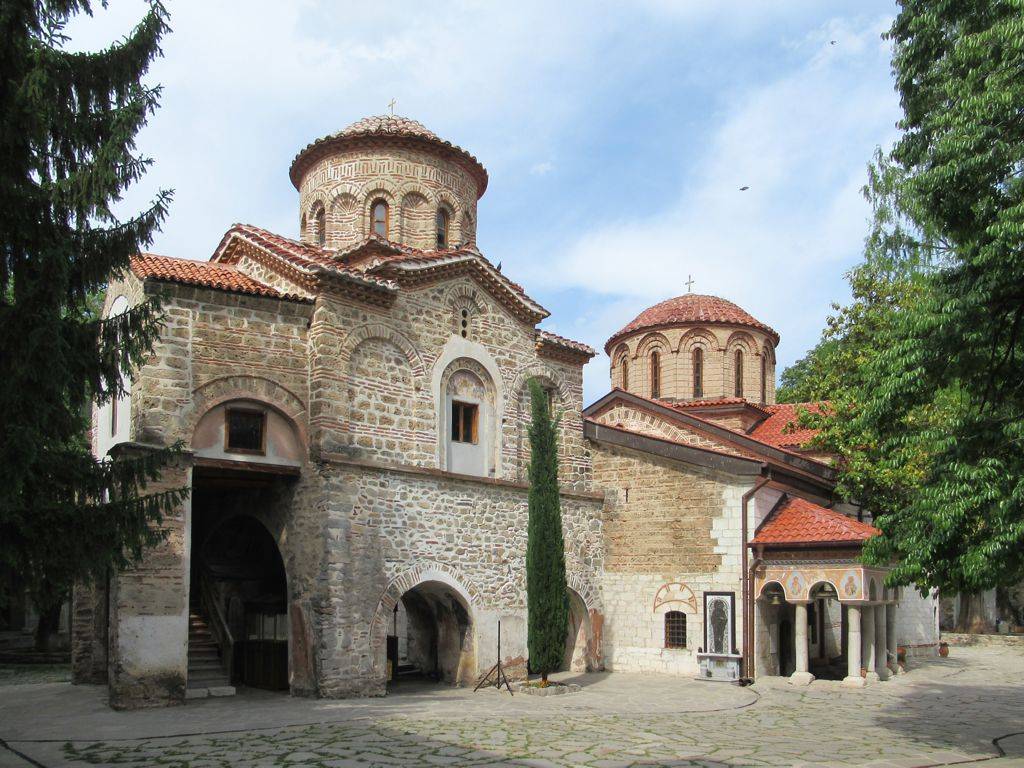
Bachkovo Monastery in Bulgaria was one of the centers of Georgian scholarship in the Balkans

The young child Bagrat IV spent the next three years in the imperial capital of Constantinople and was released in 1025. After George I's death in 1027, Bagrat, aged eight, succeeded to the throne. By the time Bagrat IV became king, the Bagratids’ drive to complete the unification of all Georgian lands had gained irreversible momentum. The kings of Georgia sat at Kutaisi in western Georgia from which they ran all of what had been the Kingdom of Abkhazia and a greater portion of Iberia; Tao had been lost to the Byzantines while a Muslim emir remained in Tbilisi and the kings of Kakheti-Hereti obstinately defended their autonomy in easternmost Georgia. Furthermore, the loyalty of great nobles to the Georgian crown was far from stable. During Bagrat's minority, the regency had advanced the positions of the high nobility whose influence he subsequently tried to limit when he assumed full ruling powers. Simultaneously, the Georgian crown was confronted with two formidable external foes: the Byzantine Empire and the resurgent Seljuk Turks.

The Seljuk threat prompted the Georgian and Byzantine governments to seek a closer cooperation. To secure the alliance, Bagrat's daughter Marta (Maria) married, at some point between 1066 and 1071, the Byzantine co-emperor Michael VII Ducas.

==== Great Seljuk invasion ====
The second half of the 11th century was marked by the strategically significant invasion of the Seljuk Turks, who by the end of the 1040s had succeeded in building a vast empire including most of Central Asia and Persia. The Seljuks made their first appearances in Georgia in the 1060s, when the sultan Alp Arslan laid waste to the south-western provinces of the Georgian kingdom and reduced Kakheti. These intruders were part of the same wave of the Turkish movement which inflicted a crushing defeat on the Byzantine army at Manzikert in 1071. Although the Georgians were able to recover from Alp Arslan's invasion by securing the Tao (Theme of Iberia), a frontier region which had been a bone of contention between Georgia and the Byzantine Empire, the Byzantine withdrawal from Anatolia brought them in more direct contact with the Seljuks. Following the 1073 devastation of Kartli by the Seljuk sultan Alp Arslan, George II successfully repelled an invasion. In 1076, the Seljuk sultan Malik Shah I surged into Georgia and reduced many settlements to ruins. Harassed by the massive Turkic influx, known in Georgian history as the Great Turkish Invasion, from 1079/80 onward, George was pressured into submitting to Malik-Shah to ensure a precious degree of peace at the price of an annual tribute.

Georgian frescoes and inscriptions from the 14th century.

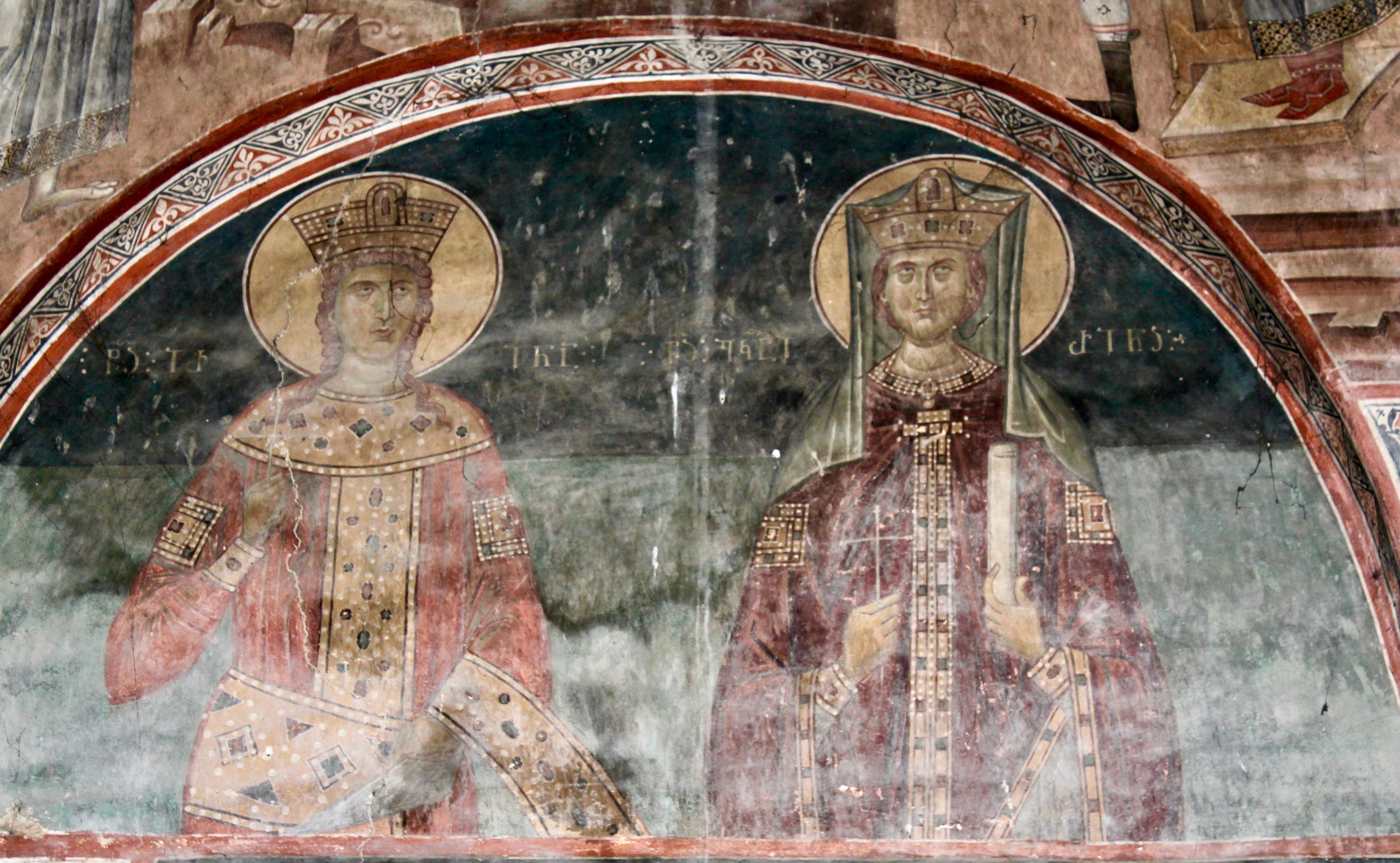
Medieval monarchs of Georgia

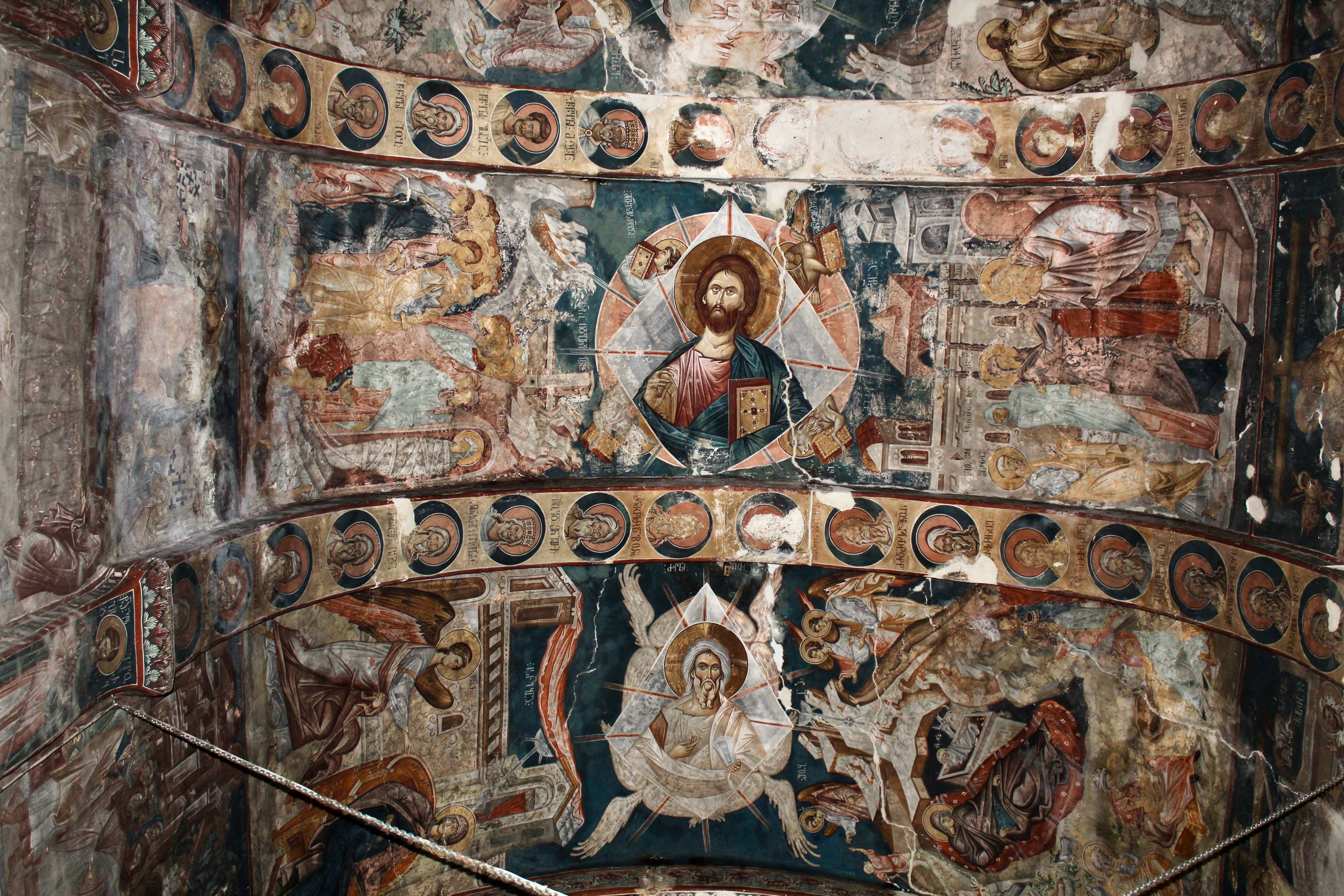
Depiction of the Holy Trinity with a gallery of saints.

=== King David IV the Builder and Georgian Reconquista ===
The struggle against the Seljuk invaders in Georgia was led by the young King David IV of the Bagrationi royal family, who inherited the throne in 1089 at the age of 16 after the abdication of his father George II Bagrationi. Soon after coming to power, David created the regular army and peasant militia in order to be able to resist Seljuk colonization of his country. The First Crusade (1096–1099) and the Crusaders' offensive against the Seljuk Turks in Anatolia and Syria favored David's successful campaigns in Georgia. By the end of 1099 David had stopped paying tribute to the Seljuks and had liberated most of the Georgian lands, with the exception of Tbilisi and Hereti. In 1103 he reorganized the Georgian Orthodox Church and closely linked it with the state by appointing as Catholicos (Archbishop) a Crown Chancellor (Mtsihnobart Ukhutsesi) of Georgia. In 1103–1105 the Georgian army took over Hereti and made successful raids into still Seljuk-controlled Shirvan. Between 1110 and 1118 David took Lori, Samshvilde, Rustavi and other fortresses of lower Kartli and Tashiri, thus turning Tbilisi into an isolated Seljuk enclave.

In 1118–1119, having considerable amounts of free, unsettled land as a result of the withdrawal of Turkish nomads, and desperately needing qualified manpower for the army, King David invited some 40,000 Kipchak warriors from North Caucasus to settle in Georgia with their families. In 1120 the ruler of Alania recognized himself as King David's vassal and afterwards sent thousands of Alans to cross the main Caucasus range into Georgia, where they settled in Kartli. The Georgian Royal army also welcomed mercenaries from Germany, Italy, and Scandinavia (all those westerners were defined in Georgia as "the Franks") as well as from Kievan Rus.

In 1121, the Seljuk Sultan Mahmud declared Jihad on Georgia and sent a strong army under one of his famous generals Ilghazi to fight the Georgians. Although significantly outnumbered by the Turks, the Georgians managed to defeat the invaders at the Battle of Didgori, and in 1122 they took over Tbilisi, making it Georgia's capital. Three years later the Georgians conquered Shirvan. As a result, the mostly Christian-populated Gishi-Kabala area in western Shirvan (a relic of the once prosperous Albanian Kingdom) was annexed by Georgia while the rest of already Islamicized Shirvan became Georgia's client-state. In the same year a large portion of Armenia was liberated by David's troops and fell into Georgian hands as well. Thus in 1124 David also became the King of Armenians, incorporating Northern Armenia into the lands of the Georgian Crown. In 1125 King David died, leaving Georgia with the status of a strong regional power. In Georgia, King David is called Agmashenebeli (English: the builder).

King David the Builder, one of Georgia's greatest kings.

David Agmashenebeli's successors (Kings Demeter I, David V and George III) continued the policy of Georgia's expansion by subordinating most of the mountain clans and tribes of North Caucasia and further securing Georgian positions in Shirvan. However, the most glorious sovereign of Georgia of that period was Queen Tamar (David's great-granddaughter).

==== Reign of Demetrius I and George III ====
The kingdom continued to flourish under Demetrius I, the son of David. As soon as he ascended to the throne, the neighboring Muslim rulers began attacking Georgia from all sides. The Seljukid sultans fought to restore the rule of the Shirvanshahs. Shirvan's large Muslim population rose against Georgia. This probably happened in 1129 or 1130, when Demetrius restored the Shirvanshahs to power in Shirvan, installing on the throne Manuchihr II, the husband of his daughter Rusudan. The Shirvanshahs had to provide the Georgian king with troops whenever the latter demanded it. In 1130, Georgia was attacked by the Sultan of Ahlat, Shah-Armen Sökmen II (c. 1128–1183). This war was started by the passage of Ani into the hands of the Georgians; Demetrius I had to compromise and give up Ani to the Shaddadid emir Fadl ibn Mahmud on terms of vassalage and inviolability of the Christian churches. In 1139, Demetrius raided the city of Ganja in Arran. He brought the iron gate of the defeated city to Georgia and donated it to Gelati Monastery at Kutaisi. Despite this brilliant victory, Demetrius could hold Ganja only for a few years. In reply to this, the sultan of the Eldiguzids attacked Ganja several times, and in 1143 the town again fell to the sultan. According to Mkhitar Gosh, Demetrius ultimately gained possession of Ganja, but, when he gave his daughter in marriage to the sultan, he presented the latter with the town as dowry, and the sultan appointed his own emir to rule it. Thus, Ganja once again fell into the hands of the Eldiguzids.

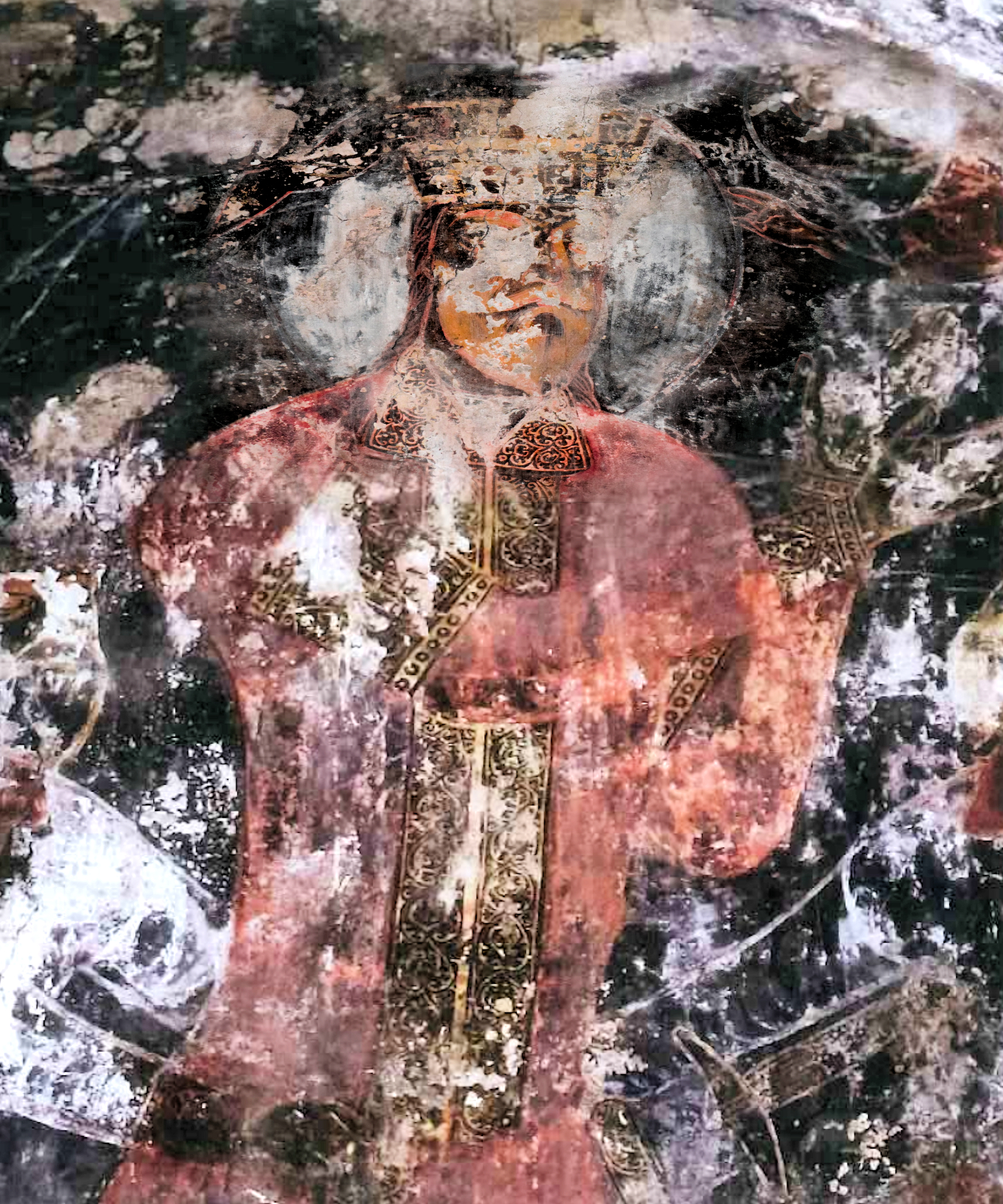
Coronation of Demetrius I, a fresco from Matskhvarishi, 1140

In 1130, Demetrius revealed a plot of nobles, probably involving the king's half-brother Vakhtang. The King arrested the conspirators and executed one of their leaders, Ioanne Abuletisdze, in 1138 (or 1145).

Fadl's successor, Fakr al-Din Shaddad, a Shaddadid emir of Ani asked for Saltuk's daughter's hand, however Saltuk refused him. This caused a deep hatred in Shaddad towards Saltuk. In 1154 he planned a plot and formed a secret alliance with Demetrius I. While a Georgian army waited in ambush, he offered tribute to Saltukids, ruler of Erzerum and asked the latter to accept him as a vassal. In 1153–1154, Emir Saltuk II marched on Ani, but Shaddad informed his suzerain, the King of Georgia, of this. Demetrius marched to Ani, defeated and captured the emir. At the request of neighboring Muslim rulers and released him for a ransom of 100,000 dinars, paid by Saltuk's sons in law and Saltuk swore not to fight against the Georgians he returned home.

Although his reign saw a disruptive family conflict related to royal succession, Georgia remained a centralized power with a strong military. A talented poet, Demetrius also continued his father's contributions to Georgia's religious polyphony. The most famous of his hymns is Thou Art a Vineyard.

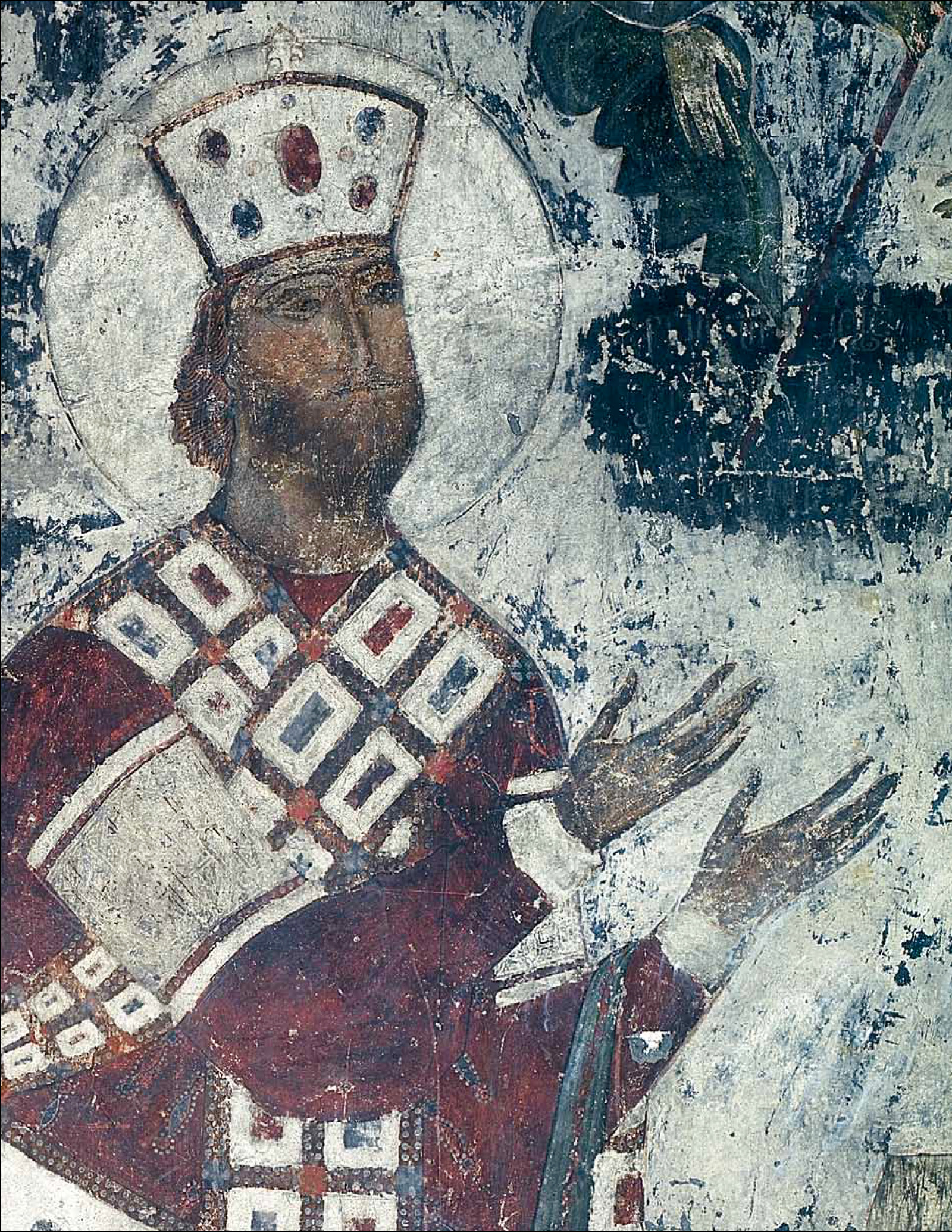
George III as depicted on a medieval fresco from Vardzia

Demetrius was succeeded by his son George III in 1156, beginning a stage of more offensive foreign policy. In the same year of his ascension to the throne, Giorgi launched a successful campaign against the Shah-Armens, raided their lands and turned back with prisoners and booty. In 1161, George III took over Ani and appointed his general Ivane Orbeli as its ruler. A coalition consisting of the ruler of Ahlat, Shah-Armen Sökmen II, the ruler of Diyarbekir, Kotb ad-Din il-Ghazi, Al-Malik of Erzerum, and others was formed as soon as the Georgians seized the town, but the latter defeated the allies. 1162 In the summer, the Georgian army, whose number reached 30,000, took Dvin. In response to this, Eldiguz Soon he proceeded northward to recover the city of Dvin. A coalition of Muslim rulers – Shah-Armen Seyfettin Beytemür, Ahmadili Arslan-Aba, Arzen emir Fakhr ul-Din and Saltuk II, led by Eldiguz took the fortress of Gagi, laid waste as far as the region of Gagi and Gegharkunik, seized prisoners and booty, and then moved to Ani capturing and granting it to Shaddadid emir Shahanshah ibn Mahmud. The Muslim rulers were jubilant, and they prepared for a new campaign. However, this time they were forestalled by George III, who marched into Arran at the beginning of 1166, occupied a region extending to Ganja, devastated the land and turn back with prisoners and booty. The Shaddadids ruled Ani for about 10 years as vassals of Eldgiz, but in 1174 George III took the Shahanshah as a prisoner and occupied Ani once again, appointing Ivane Orbeli as governor. After that, Eldiguz together with other Muslim rulers invaded Georgia twice, the first invasion was successfully repelled by the Georgians, but during the second invasion Georgians lost Ani and in 1175 it was recaptured by Shaddadids.

=== Queen Tamar the Great and the Golden Age (1184–1213) ===
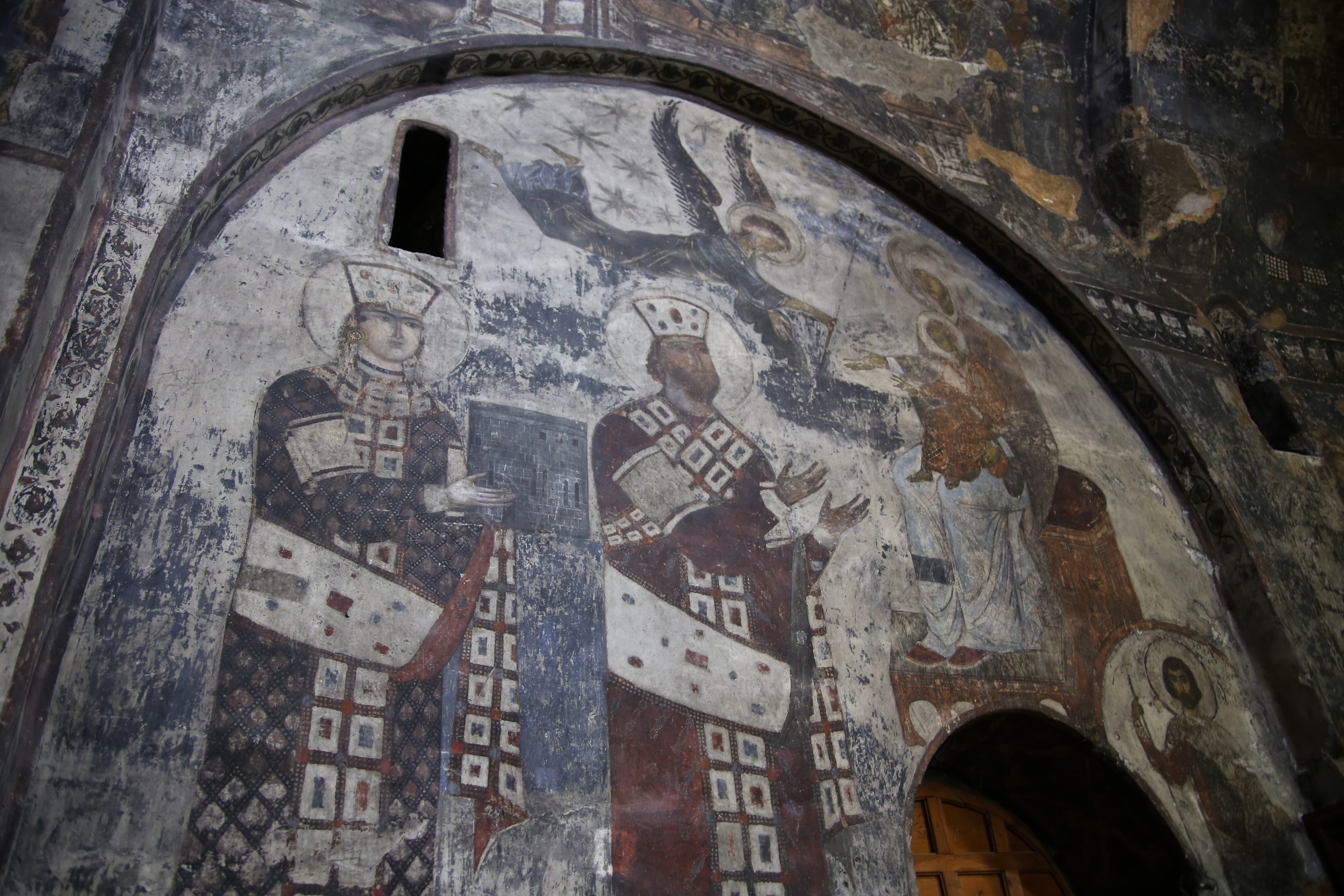
Queen Tamar and her father King George III, fresco from Vardzia.

The reign of Queen Tamar represented the peak of Georgia's might in the whole history of the nation. In 1194–1204, Tamar's armies crushed new Turkish invasions from the south-east and south and launched several successful campaigns into Turkish-controlled Southern Armenia. As a result, most of Southern Armenia, including the cities of Karin, Erzinjan, Khelat, Muş and Van, came under Georgian control. Although it was not included in the lands of the Georgian Crown, and was left under the nominal rule of local Turkish Emirs and Sultans, Southern Armenia became a protectorate of the Kingdom of Georgia.

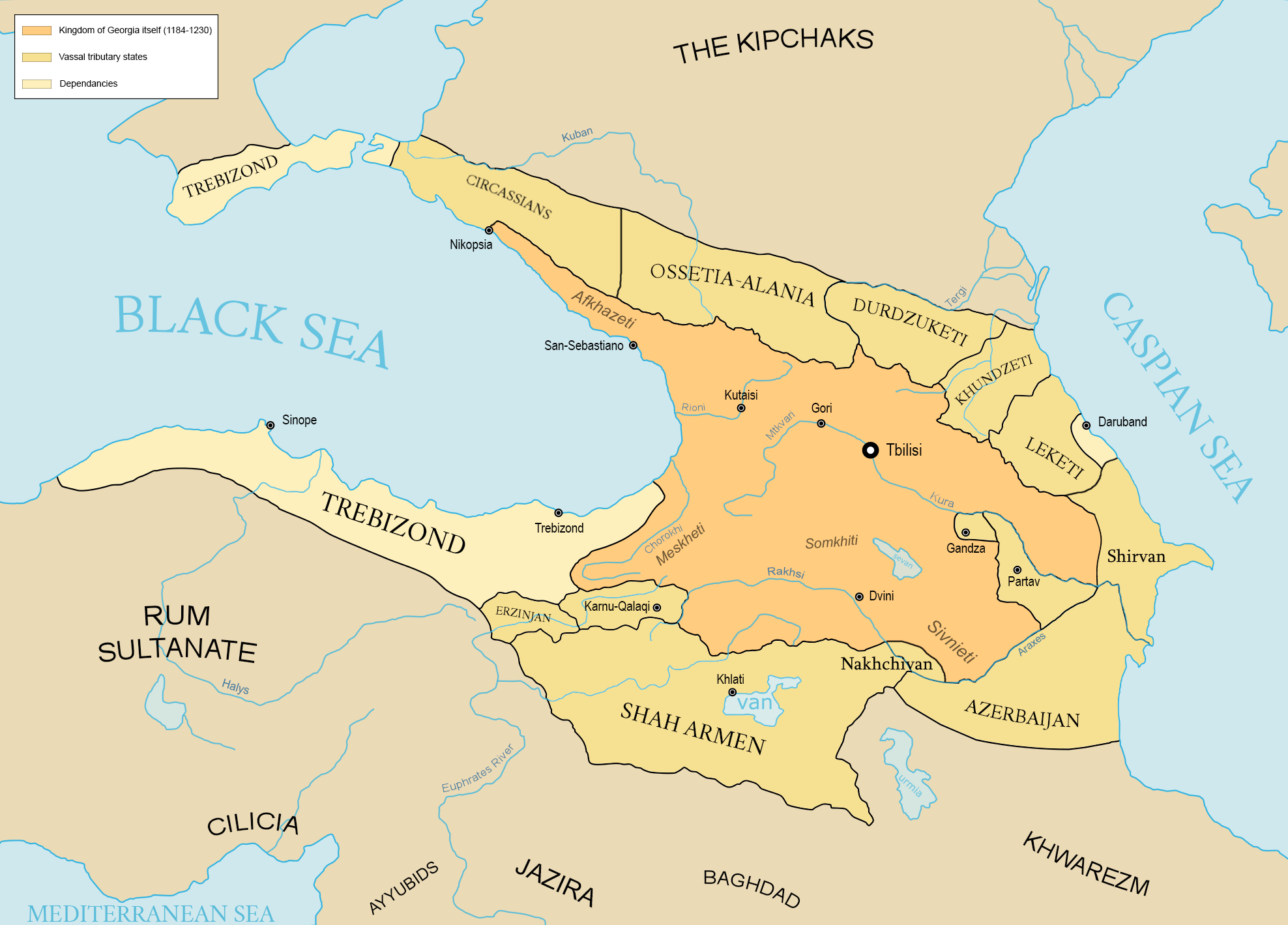
Kingdom of Georgia during its Golden Age.

The temporary fall of the Byzantine Empire in 1204 to the Crusaders left Georgia and the Bulgarian Empire as the strongest Christian states in the whole East Mediterranean area. The same year Queen Tamar sent her troops to take over the former Byzantine Lazona and Paryadria with the cities of Atina, Riza, Trebizond, Kerasunt, Amysos, Cotyora, Heraclea and Sinopa. In 1205, the occupied territory was transformed into the Empire of Trebizond, which was dependent on Georgia. Tamar's relative Prince Alexios Komnenos was crowned as its Emperor. In the immediate years after, Georgian armies invaded northern Persia (modern day Iranian Azerbaijan) and took the cities of Marand, Tabriz (1208), Ardabil (1208), Zanjan, Khoy (1210), and Qazvin (1210), placing part of the conquered territory under a Georgian protectorate. This was the maximum territorial extent of Georgia throughout her history. Queen Tamar was addressed as "The Queen of Abkhazians, Kartvels, Rans, Kakhs and Armenians, Shirvan-Shakhine and Shakh-in-Shakhine, The Sovereign of the East and West". Georgian historians often refer to her as "Queen Tamar the Great".

The period between the early 12th and the early 13th centuries, and especially the era of Tamar the Great, can truly be considered as the golden age of Georgia. Besides the political and military achievements, it was marked by the development of Georgian culture, including architecture, literature, philosophy and sciences.

Jacques de Vitry, the Patriarch of Jerusalem at that time wrote:

There is also in the East another Christian people, who are very warlike and valiant in battle, being strong in body and powerful in the countless numbers of their warriors...Being entirely surrounded by infidel nations...these men are called Georgians, because they especially revere and worship St. George...Whenever they come on pilgrimage to the Lord's Sepulchre, they march into the Holy City...without paying tribute to anyone, for the Saracens dare in no wise molest them...

=== Mongol invasion and decline of the Georgian Kingdom ===
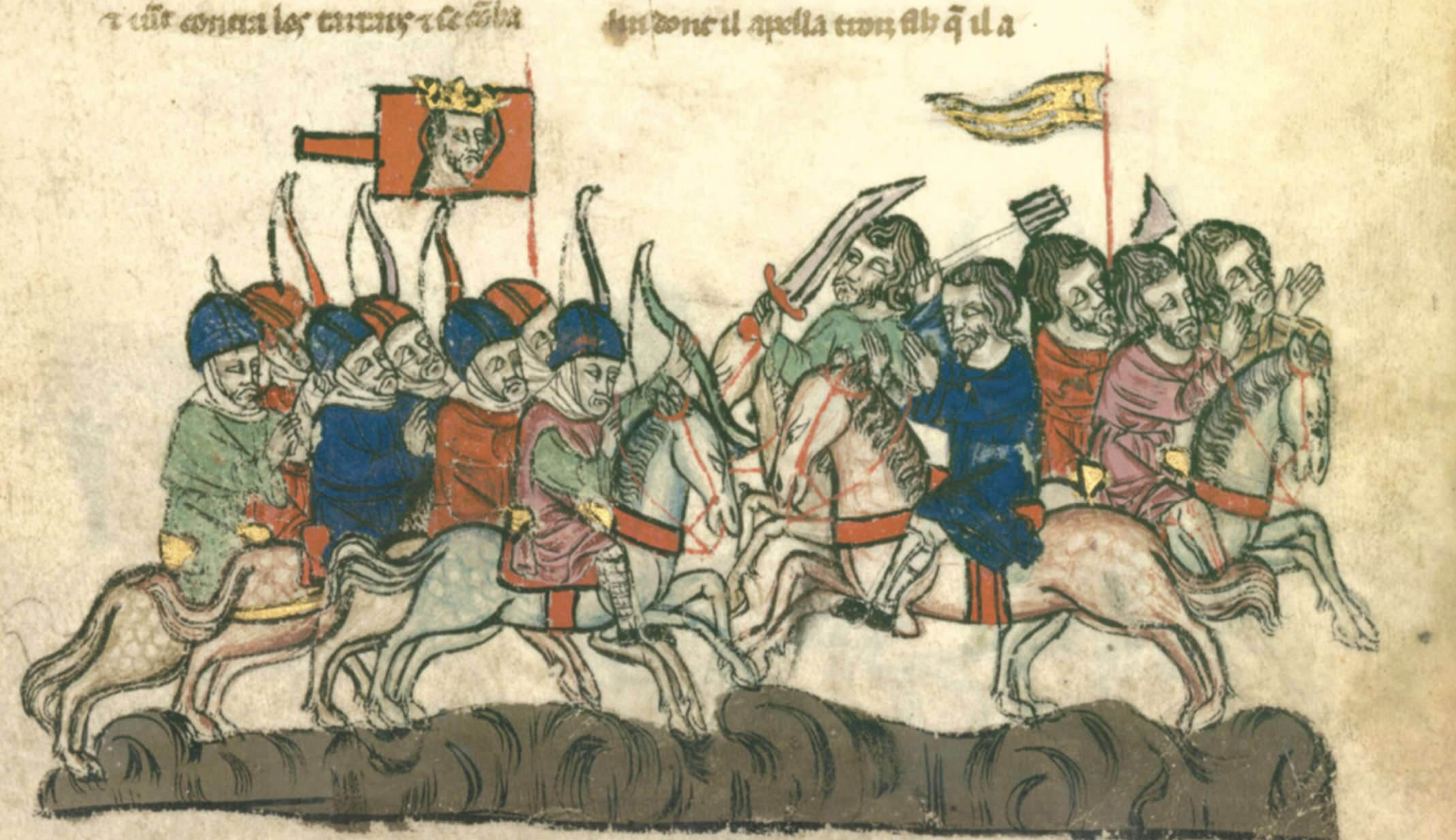
A medieval illustration of the Georgian king George IV Lasha waging war against the Mongols in 1220. King George is shown in blue garment on a white horse holding a whip. A depiction from La Flor des estoires de la terre d'Orient by Hayton of Corycus.

In 1225 Jalal al-Din Mangburni, the ruler of Khwarazmian Empire, attacked Georgia, defeating its forces in the Battle of Garni, and conquered Tbilisi., after which allegedly a hundred thousand citizens were put to death for not renouncing Christianity.

In the 1220s, the South Caucasus and Asia Minor faced the invasion of the Mongols. In spite of fierce resistance by Georgian-Armenian forces and their allies, the whole area including most of Georgia, all Armenian lands and Central Anatolia eventually fell to the Mongols in 1236.

In 1243, Queen Rusudan of Georgia signed a peace treaty with the Mongols in accordance with which Georgia lost her client-states, ceded western Shirvan, Nakhichevan and some other territories and agreed to pay tribute to the Mongols as well as to let them occupy and de facto rule more than half of the remaining territory. Although Mongol-occupied Tbilisi remained the official capital of the kingdom, the Queen refused to return there and stayed in Kutaisi until her death in 1245. In addition to all the above hardships, even the Kingdom of Western Georgia, the part of the kingdom that remained free of the Mongols, started disintegrating: the Crown started losing control over the warlords of Samtskhe (southern provinces of Georgia) who established their own relations with the Mongols and by the year 1266 practically seceded from Georgia.

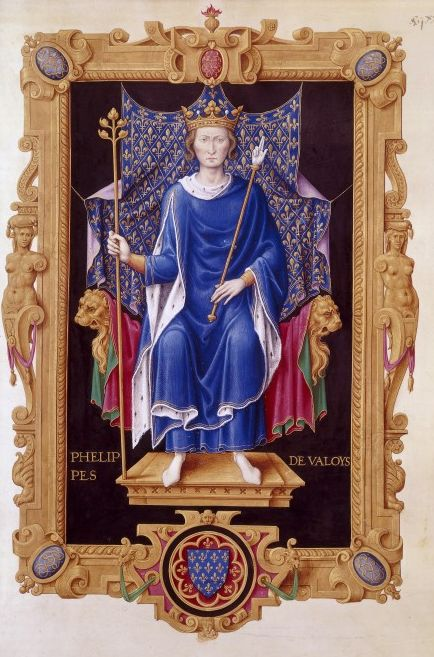
Correspondence between George V and Philip VI of France reveal Georgia's disappointment with lack of firm Western commitment and an offer to again participate in the Crusades.

The period between 1259 and 1330 was marked by the struggle of the Georgians against the Mongol Ilkhanate for full independence. The first anti-Mongol uprising started in 1259 under the leadership of King David Narin who in fact waged his war for almost thirty years. The Anti-Mongol strife went on under the Kings Demeter II (1270–1289) and David VIII (1293–1311).

Ultimately, it was King George the Brilliant (1314–1346) who took advantage of the declining Ilkhanate, stopped paying tribute to the Mongols, restored the pre-1220 state borders of Georgia, and returned the Empire of Trebizond into Georgia's sphere of influence. During this period of renewed strength, George V exchanged letters with Philip VI of France in which he regretted lack of Western resolve in fighting against the Muslims and promised to join the French in the Crusades should there be need:

Domini reges Franciae frequenter reges orientales commoverunt contra Saracenos, postea non venientes eos dimittebant in tribulatione guerrae ; sed dicatis sibi, quod, quando mare transiverit, statim me videbit ad suum beneplacitum cum XXX millibus armatorum.
“French kings often call on Eastern kings to fight against the Saracen (Muslims), but then usually fail to fulfill their promise and leave their allies on the battle field to face the enemy alone. Correspondingly, inform me when you intend to cross the sea and I along with my 30,000 soldiers will immediately meet you as you arrive.“ Letter from George V to Philip VI of France, 1332-33.

== Early modern period ==
=== Ottoman and Iranian domination ===
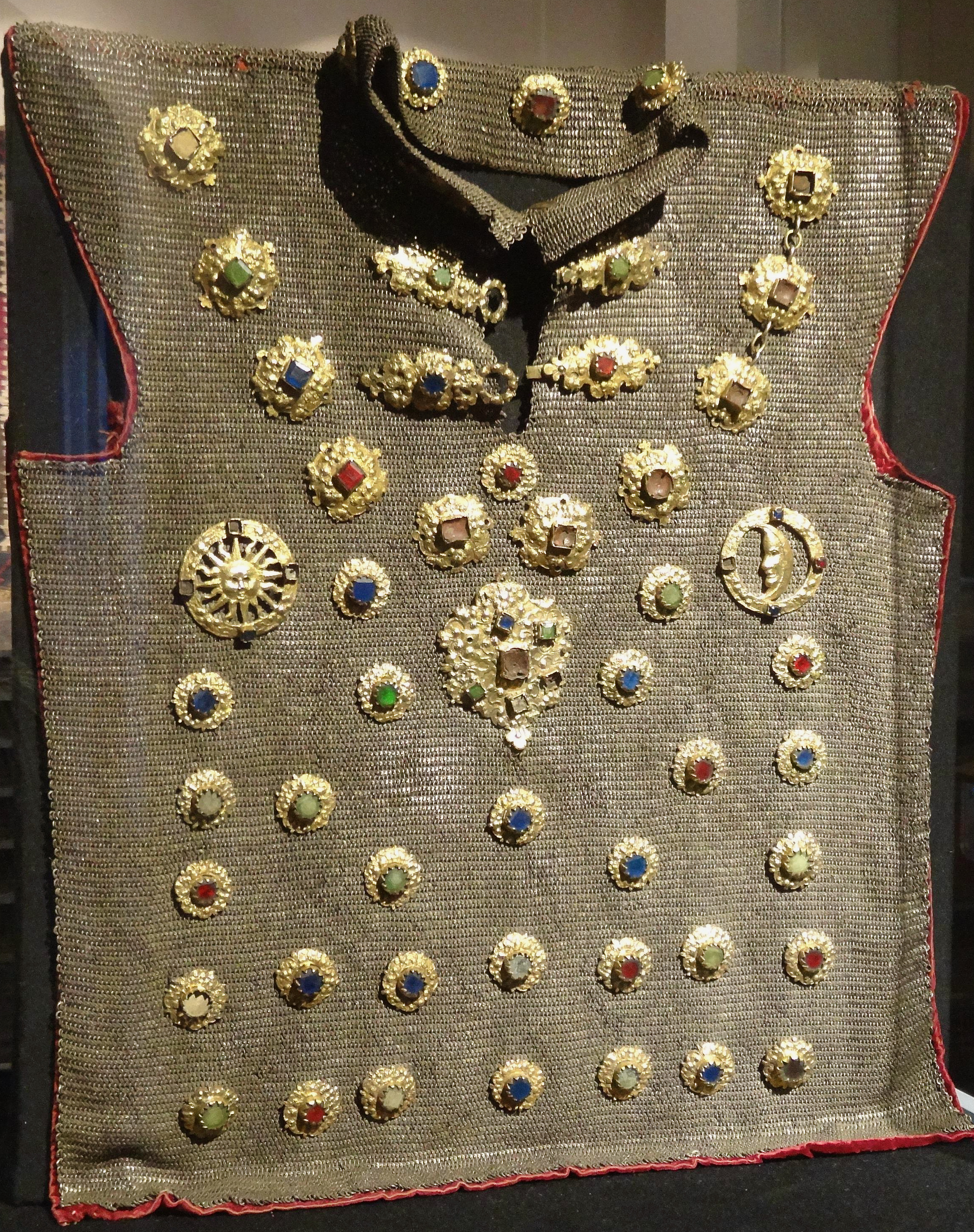
Royal armour of King Alexander III, dating back to the early 1600s. Held at the Georgian National Museum.

By the middle of the 15th century, most of Georgia's old neighbor-states disappeared from the map within less than a hundred years. The fall of Constantinople to the Ottoman Turks in 1453 sealed the Black Sea and cut the remnants of Christian states of the area from Europe and the rest of the Christian world. Georgia remained connected to the West through contact with the Genoese colonies of the Crimea.

As a result of these changes, the Georgian Kingdom suffered economic and political decline and in the 1460s the kingdom fractured into several kingdoms and principalities:

- 3 Kingdoms of Kartli, Kakheti and Imereti.
- 5 Principalities of Guria, Svaneti, Meskheti, Abkhazeti and Samegrelo.

Neighboring large empires subsequently exploited the internal division of the weakened country, and beginning in the 16th century Turkish and Iranian forces subjugated western and eastern regions of Georgia, respectively. In 1555, the Ottomans and the Safavids signed the Peace of Amasya following the Ottoman–Safavid War (1532–55), defining spheres of influence in Georgia, assigning Imereti in the west to the Turks and Kartli-Kakheti in the east to the Persians. The treaty, however, was not in force for long as the Ottomans gained the upper hand and launched campaigns during the next Ottoman-Safavid war threatening to end the Persian domination in the region. The Safavid Persians reestablished their hegemony over all lost regions some two decades later including full hegemony over most of Georgia in the Ottoman–Safavid War (1603–18).

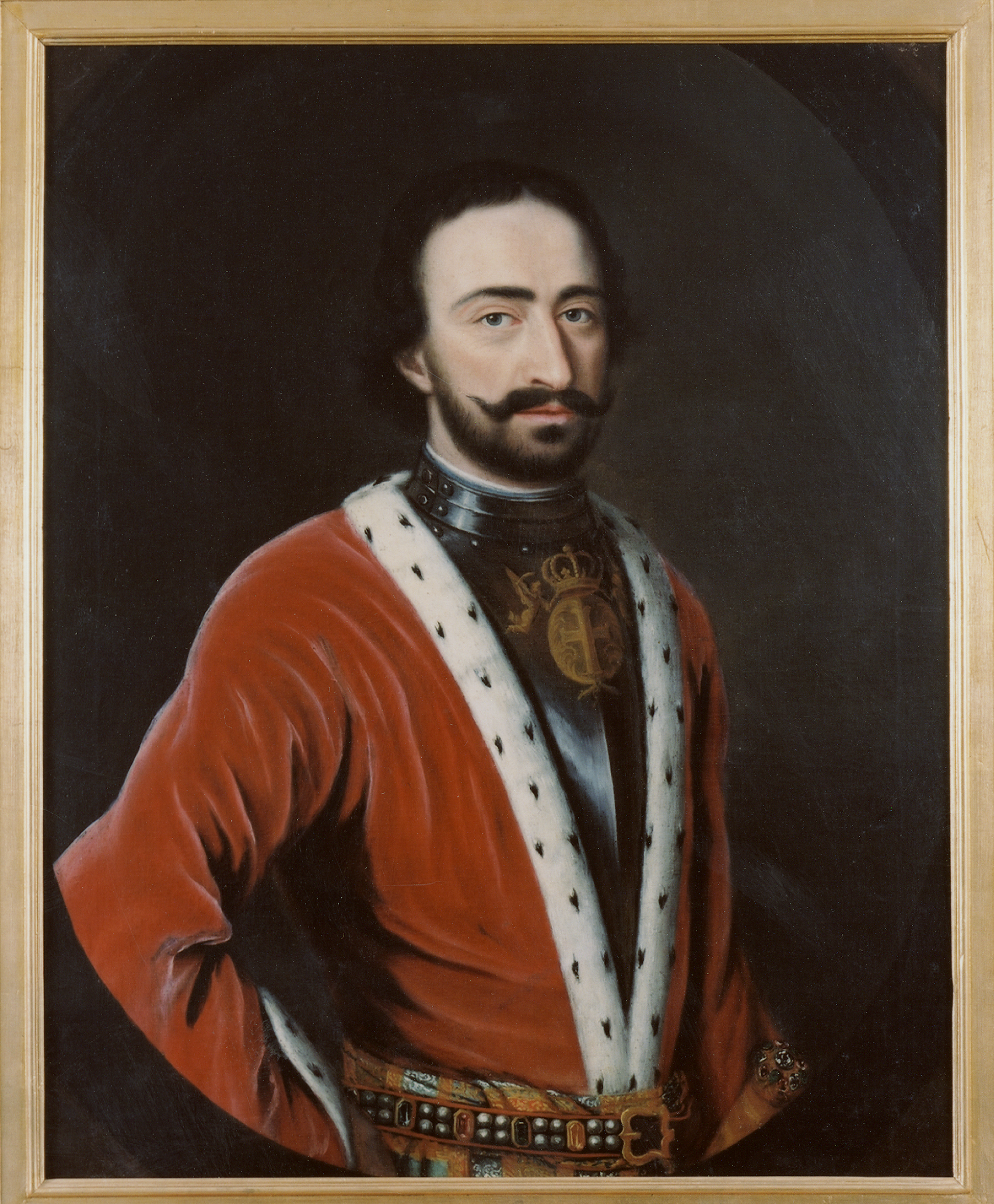
Prince Alexander, one of several Georgian royals to end up in exile during tumultuous 17th-18th centuries.

After the Turks failed to gain permanent foothold in the eastern Caucasus, the Persians sought to strengthen their position in the region. During the next 150 years, various eastern Georgian kings and nobles rose into rebellion, while others accepted Persian overlordship for various benefits. In 1616, Abbas I dispatched his troops to Georgia, aiming to suppress the Georgian revolt in Tbilisi. However, his soldiers met heavy resistance from the citizens of Tbilisi. Enraged, the Shah ordered a punitive massacre, resulting in the deaths of an estimated 130,000 to 200,000 people. Thousands of Georgians from the easternmost province of Kakheti were deported to Persia. During this conflict, Queen Ketevan was sent to negotiate with Abbas, but in an act of revenge for Georgia's stubbornness, the Persian Shah ordered the queen to renounce Christianity, and upon her refusal, had her tortured to death. By the 17th century, both eastern and western Georgia had sunk into poverty as the result of the constant warfare. The French traveller Jean Chardin, who visited the region of Mingrelia in 1671, noted the wretchedness of the peasants, the arrogance of the nobles and the ignorance of the clergy.

These grave regional threats pushed local Georgian rulers to seek closer ties with Tsardom of Russia. In 1649, at the recommendation of its eastern Georgian counterparts, the Kingdom of Imereti sent ambassadors to the Russian royal court, with Russia returning the favor and sending its own ambassadors to Imereti in 1651. In the presence of these ambassadors, Alexander III of Imereti swore an oath of allegiance to Tsar Alexis of Russia on behalf of Imereti. However, internal conflicts among Georgian royalty continued and, although Alexander III briefly managed to control all of Western Georgia, this consolidation was short lived. By the time of his death in 1660, Western Georgia was still in a state of flux. In this chaotic period, Archil II was enthroned and deposed several times. His efforts to secure assistance from Russia and, later, Pope Innocent XII proved unsuccessful and he was finally exiled to Russia. Having given up on reclaiming the Imeretian throne, Archil's son Alexander, a friend of Peter the Great, dedicated himself to the Russian Imperial Army, where he rose to the second highest rank.

=== The 18th and 19th century ===
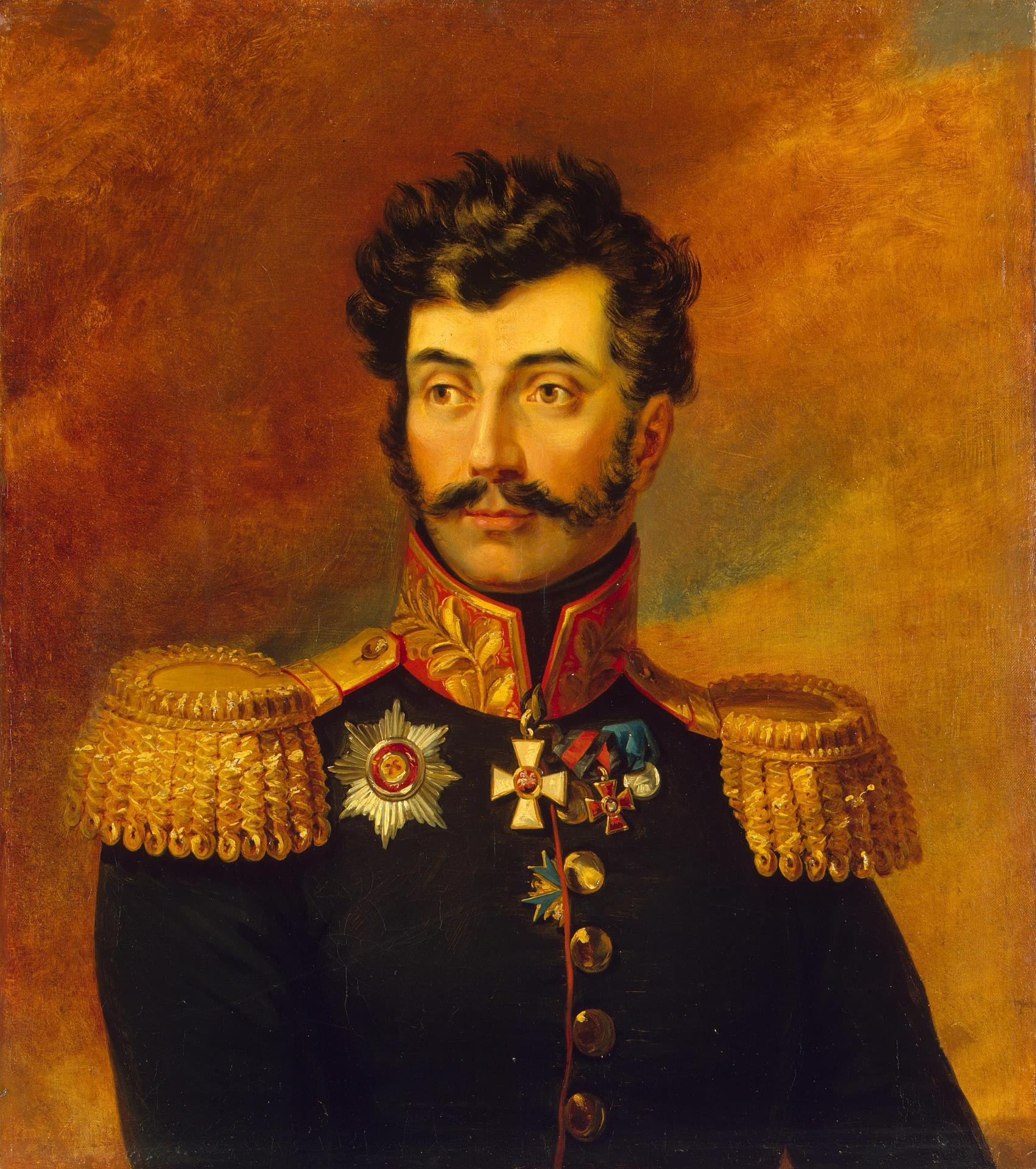
Roman Bagration, member of a Georgian military family, participated in campaigns to recapture historically Georgian lands from the Ottoman Empire.

In the early 18th century, Kartli, the most politically dominant region of Georgia areas, saw a partial recovery under Vakhtang VI, who instituted a new law code and tried to improve the economy. His reign saw the establishment of the first Georgian-language printing press in 1709.

In 1722–1724, a successful Afghan invasion of Persia was followed by invasions from Turkey and Russia. In the Treaty of Constantinople (1724), Turkey and Russia divided a large part of Persia between them, including Georgia, which went to Turkey. Nader Shah revived Persia, expelled the Afghans, and drove the Turks out of Kakheti and the rest of Georgia in 1735.

Teimuraz sided with the Persians and was installed as a Persian wali (governor) in Kakheti. However, many Georgian nobles refused to accept the new regime and rebelled gainst the heavy tribute levied by Nader Shah. Teimuraz and his son Heraclius remained loyal to Persia, partly in order to prevent the comeback of the rival Mukhrani branch, whose fall early in the 1720s had opened the way to Teimuraz's accession in Kartli. Heraclius served as a lieutenant to his father and assumed the regency when Teimuraz was briefly summoned for consultations in the Persian capital of Isfahan in 1744. In the meantime, Heraclius defeated a coup attempt by the rival Georgian prince Abdullah Beg of the Mukhrani dynasty, and helped Teimuraz suppress the aristocratic opposition to Persian hegemony led by Givi Amilakhvari. As a reward, Nader Shah granted the kingship of Kartli to Teimuraz and of Kakheti to Heraclius, and also arranged the marriage of his nephew Ali-Qoli Khan, who eventually would succeed him as Adil Shah, to Teimuraz's daughter Kethevan.

Yet, both Georgian kingdoms remained under heavy Persian tribute until Nader Shah was assassinated in 1747. Teimuraz and Heraclius took advantage of the ensuing political instability to assert Georgian independence and expelled Persian garrisons from all key positions in Georgia, including Tbilisi. In close cooperation with each other, they managed to prevent a new revolt by the Mukhranian supporters fomented by Ebrahim Khan, brother of Adel Shah, in 1748. They concluded an anti-Persian alliance with the khans of Azerbaijan who were particularly vulnerable to the aggression from Persian warlords and agreed to recognize Heraclius's supremacy in eastern Transcaucasia. In 1752, the Georgian kings sent a mission to Russia to request 3,000 Russian troops or a subsidy to enable them to hire Circassian mercenaries in order to invade Persia and install a pro-Russian government there. The embassy failed to yield any results, however, for the Russian court was preoccupied with European affairs.

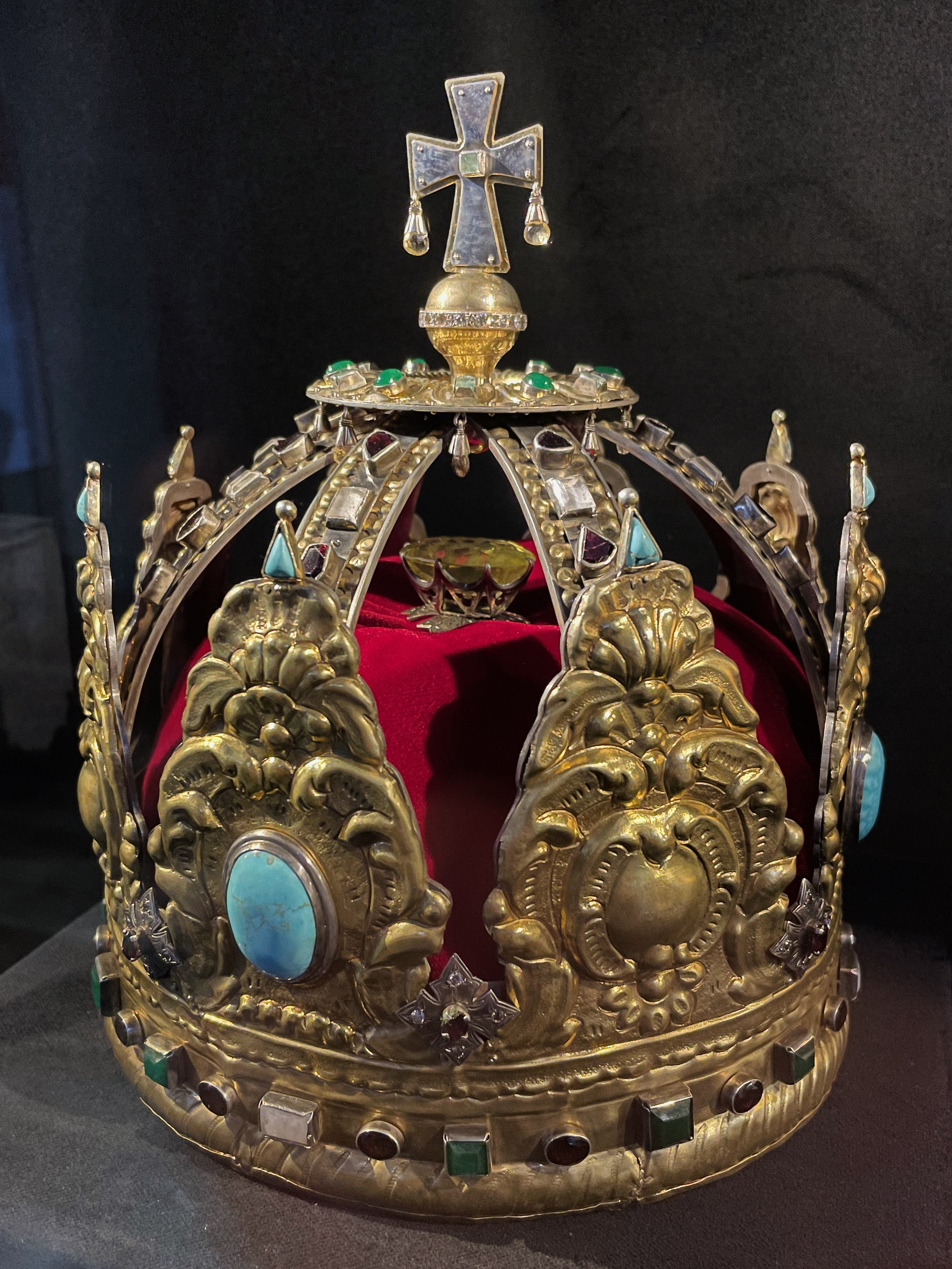
Ceremonial crown of the Georgian high nobility

In 1762, Teimuraz II died while on a diplomatic mission to the court of St. Petersburg, and Heraclius succeeded him as King of Kartli, thus uniting eastern Georgia politically for the first time in three centuries. He turned towards Russia for protection against Ottoman and most notably Persian attacks. The Russian empress Catherine the Great was keen to have the Georgians as allies in her wars against the Turks, but sent only meagre forces to help them. In 1769–1772, a handful of Russian troops under General Gottlieb Heinrich Totleben fought against Turks in Imereti. The Russian troops retreated before a clash against the Turks.

In 1783, Erekle signed the Treaty of Georgievsk with Russia, according to which Kartli-Kakheti got established as a protectorate of Russia, which guaranteed Georgia's territorial integrity and the continuation of its reigning Bagrationi dynasty in return for prerogatives in the conduct of Georgian foreign affairs. The treaty therefore confirmed that Georgia abjured any form of dependence on Persia (who had been the suzerains of most of Georgia for centuries) or another power, and every new Georgian monarch would require the confirmation and investiture of the Russian tsar, and have no diplomatic communications with other nations without Russia's prior consent. But when another Russo-Turkish War broke out in 1787, Erekle maintained diplomatic contacts with Ottoman liege Suleiman pasha from Akhaltsikhe and signed a separate treaty with him. This treaty was ratified by the sultan in the summer of 1787. Therefore, the Russians withdrew their troops from the region for use elsewhere, leaving Erekle's kingdom unprotected. In 1795, the new Persian shah, Agha Mohammed Khan, infuriated with the Treaty of Georgievsk which he saw as an act of treason, invaded the country and captured and burnt the capital, Tbilisi, to the ground, reestablishing Persian rule over Georgia.

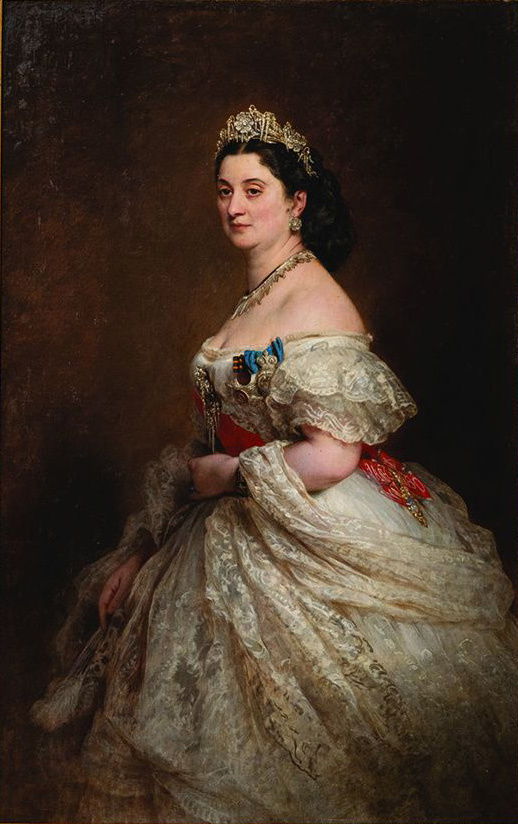
Princess Ekaterine resisted Turkish encroachment in Western Georgia.

In spite of failure to honor the terms of the Treaty of Georgievsk, Georgian rulers felt they had nobody else to turn to. After Erekle's death, a civil war broke out over the succession to the throne of Kartli-Kakheti and one of the rival candidates called on Russia to intervene and decide matters. On 8 January 1801, Tsar Paul I of Russia signed a decree on the incorporation of Georgia (Kingdom of Kartli-Kakheti) within the Russian Empire, which was confirmed by Tsar Alexander I on 12 September 1801. The Georgian envoy in Saint Petersburg, Garsevan Chavchavadze, reacted with a note of protest that was presented to the Russian vice-chancellor Alexander Kurakin. In May 1801 Russian General Carl Heinrich Knorring dethroned the Georgian heir to the throne David Batonishvili and deployed a government headed by General Ivan Petrovich Lasarev. By this, Persia officially lost control over the city and the wider Georgian lands it had been ruling for centuries.

A part of the Georgian nobility did not accept the decree until April 1802, when General Knorring assembled the nobility in Tbilisi's Sioni Cathedral and forced them to take an oath to the imperial crown of Russia. Those who disagreed were arrested temporarily.

In the Russo-Persian War (1804-1813), Fath-Ali Shah Qajar sought to regain full control over Georgia and Dagestan. In the summer of 1805, Russian troops on the river Askerani and near Zagam defeated the Qajar Persian army, saving Tbilisi from its attack. Russian suzerainty over traditionally Persian areas of eastern and southern Georgia was formally recognized in 1813 in the Treaty of Gulistan.

In 1810, the kingdom of Imereti (Western Georgia) was annexed by the Russian Empire after the suppression of King Solomon II's resistance.

From 1803 to 1878, as a result of numerous Russian wars against Turkey and Persia, several formerly Georgian territories were annexed to the Russian Empire. These areas (Batumi, Artvin, Akhaltsikhe, Poti, and Abkhazia) now represent the majority of the territory of the present state of Georgia.

Georgia was reunified for the first time in centuries but had lost its independence.

== Modern history ==
=== Russian Empire ===
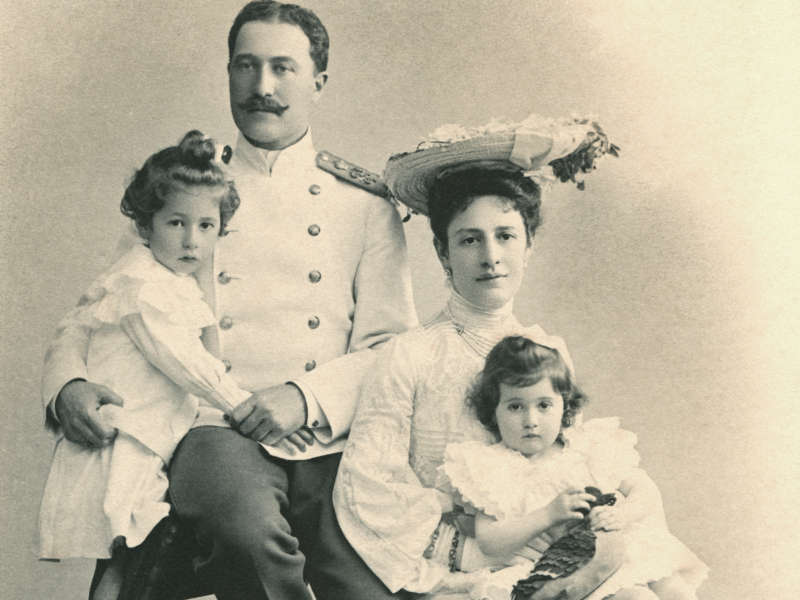
19th century Georgian noble family: General Solomon Makashvili and family around 1900

The Russian and Georgian societies had much in common: the main religion was Orthodox Christianity and in both countries a land-owning aristocracy ruled over a population of serfs. The Russian authorities aimed to integrate Georgia into the rest of their empire, but at first Russian rule proved high-handed, arbitrary and insensitive to local law and customs, leading to a conspiracy by Georgian nobles in 1832 and a revolt by peasants and nobles in Guria in 1841. Things changed with the appointment of Mikhail Vorontsov as Viceroy of the Caucasus in 1845. Count Vorontsov's new policies, alleged by himself, won over the Georgian nobility, who became increasingly eager to abandon Islamic influences that had been forced upon Georgia in the preceding centuries and pursued, after the example of Russian nobility, a long-sought process of Europeanization. Life for Georgian serfs was very different, however, since the rural economy remained seriously depressed. Georgian serfs lived in dire poverty, subject to the frequent threat of starvation. Few of them lived in the towns, where what little trade and industry there was, was in the hands of Armenians, whose ancestors had migrated to Georgia in the Middle Ages.

Serfdom was abolished in Russian lands in 1861. The tsar also wanted to emancipate the serfs of Georgia, but without losing the loyalty of the nobility whose revenues depended on peasant labor. This called for delicate negotiations before serfdom was gradually phased out in the Georgian provinces from 1864 onwards.

==== Growth of the national movement ====
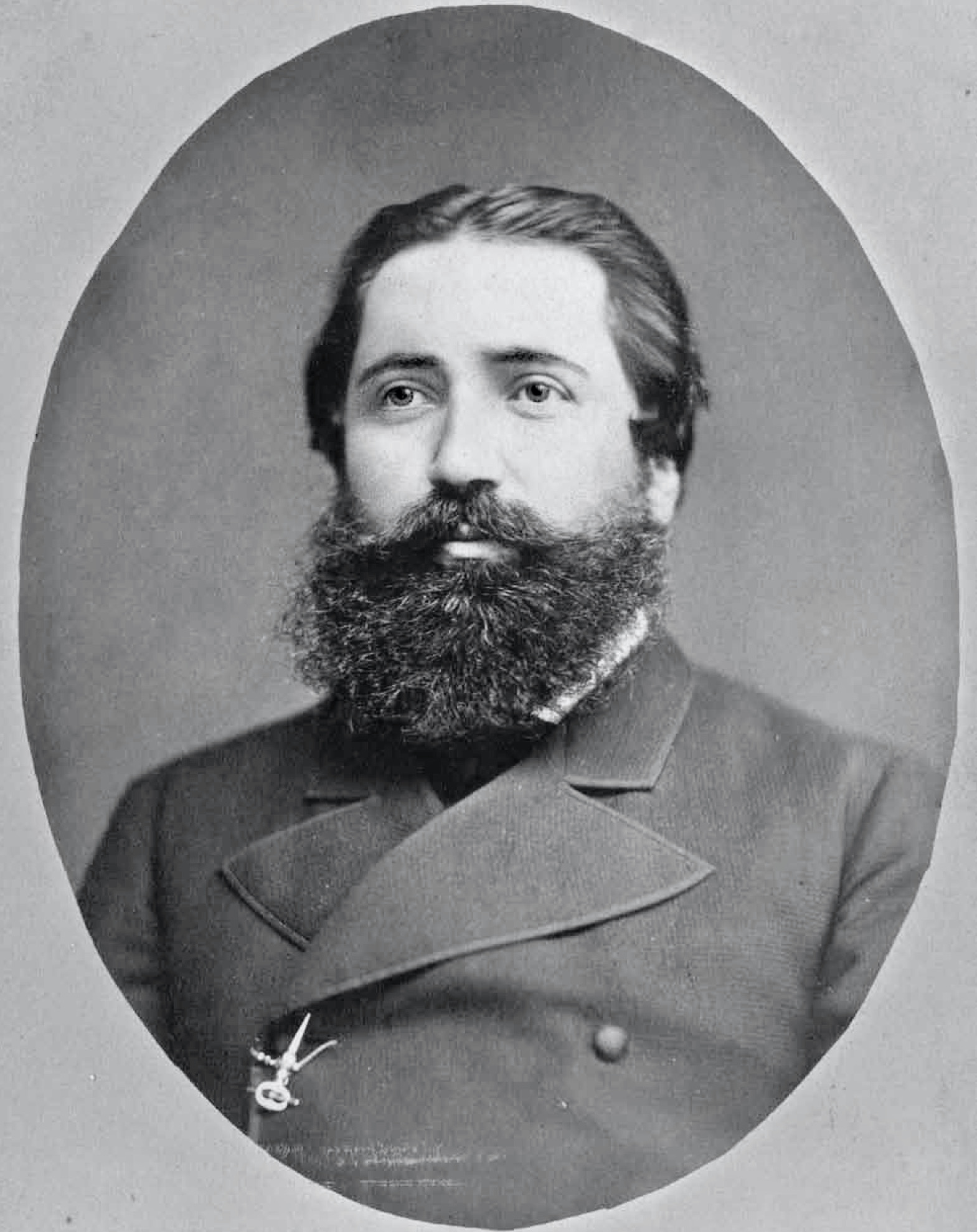
Ilia Chavchavadze, leader of the Georgian national revival in the 1860s.

The emancipation of the serfs pleased neither the serfs nor the nobles. The poverty of the serfs had not been alleviated while the nobles had lost some of their privileges. The nobles in particular also felt threatened by the growing power of the urban, Armenian middle class in Georgia, who prospered as capitalism came to the region. Georgian dissatisfaction with Tsarist autocracy and Armenian economic domination led to the development of a national liberation movement in the second half of the 19th century.

A large-scale peasant revolt occurred in 1905, which led to political reforms that eased the tensions for a period. During this time, the Marxist Social Democratic Party became the dominant political movement in Georgia, being elected to all the Georgian seats in the Russian State Duma established after 1905. Josef Vissarionovich Jugashvili (more famously known as Joseph Stalin), a Georgian Bolshevik, became a leader of the revolutionary (and anti-Menshevik) movement in Georgia but never gained popular support comparable to that of the Social Democrats. During this time, other Georgian nationalist forces did their part to weaken the Russian rule with subversive activities, with notable incidents like the Dusheti treasury heist of 1906.

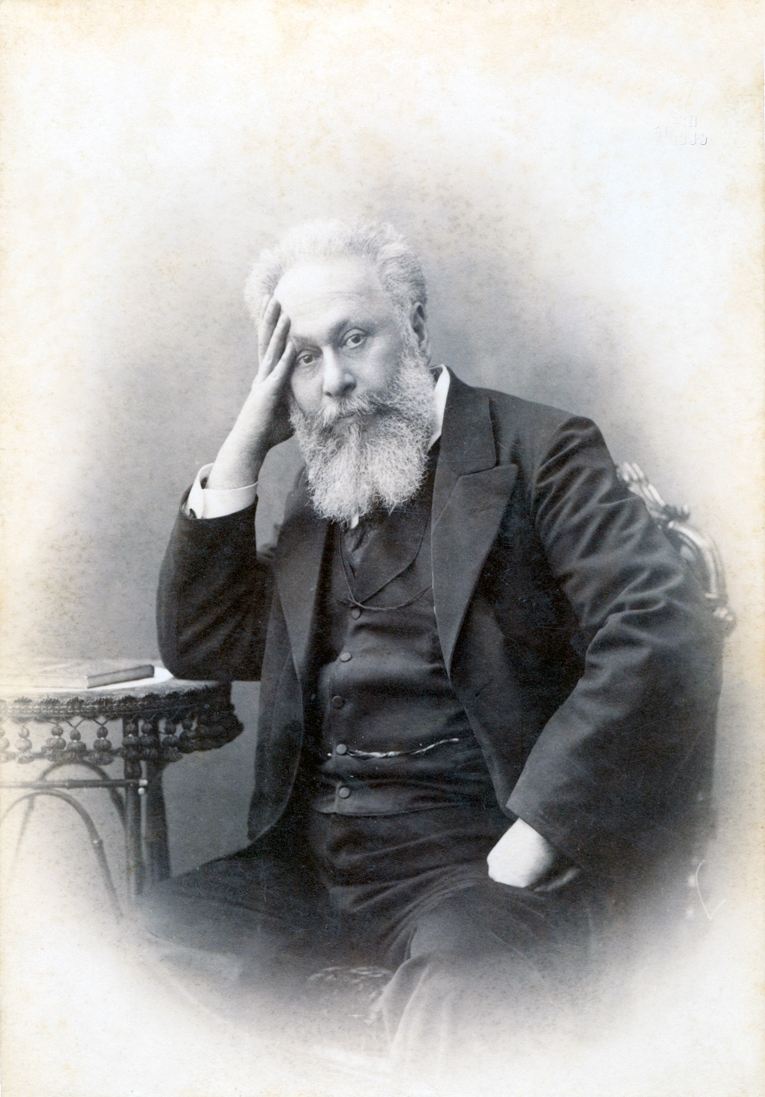
Akaki Tsereteli, prominent Georgian poet and national liberation movement figure.

Many Georgians were upset by the loss of independence of the Georgian Orthodox Church. The Russian clergy took control of Georgian churches and monasteries, prohibiting use of the Georgian liturgy and desecrating medieval Georgian frescoes on various churches all across Georgia.

Between the years of 1855 to 1907, the Georgian patriotic movement was launched under the leadership of Prince Ilia Chavchavadze, world-renowned poet, novelist and orator. Chavchavadze financed new Georgian schools and supported the Georgian national theatre. In 1866 he launched the newspaper Iveria, which played an important part in reviving Georgian national consciousness. His struggle for national awakening was welcomed by the leading Georgian intellectuals of that time such as Giorgi Tsereteli, Ivane Machabeli, Akaki Tsereteli, Niko Nikoladze, Alexander Kazbegi and Iakob Gogebashvili.

The Georgian intelligentsia's support for Prince Chavchavadze and Georgian independence is shown in this declaration:

Our patriotism is of course of an entire different kind: it consists solely in a sacred feeling towards our mother land: ... in it there is no hate for other nations, no desire to enslave anybody, no urge to impoverish anybody. Out patriots' desire to restore Georgia's right to self-government and their own civic rights, to preserve their national characteristics and culture, without which no people can exist as a society of human beings.

The last decades of the 19th century witnessed a Georgian literary revival in which writers emerged of a stature unequalled since the Golden Age of Rustaveli seven hundred years before. Ilia Chavchavadze himself excelled alike in lyric and ballad poetry, in the novel, the short story and the essay. Apart from Chavchavadze, the most universal literary genius of the age was Akaki Tsereteli, known as "the immortal nightingale of the Georgian people." Along with Niko Nikoladze and Iakob Gogebashvili, these literary figures contributed significantly to the national cultural revival and were therefore known as the founding fathers of modern Georgia.

=== Democratic Republic of Georgia (1918–1921) ===
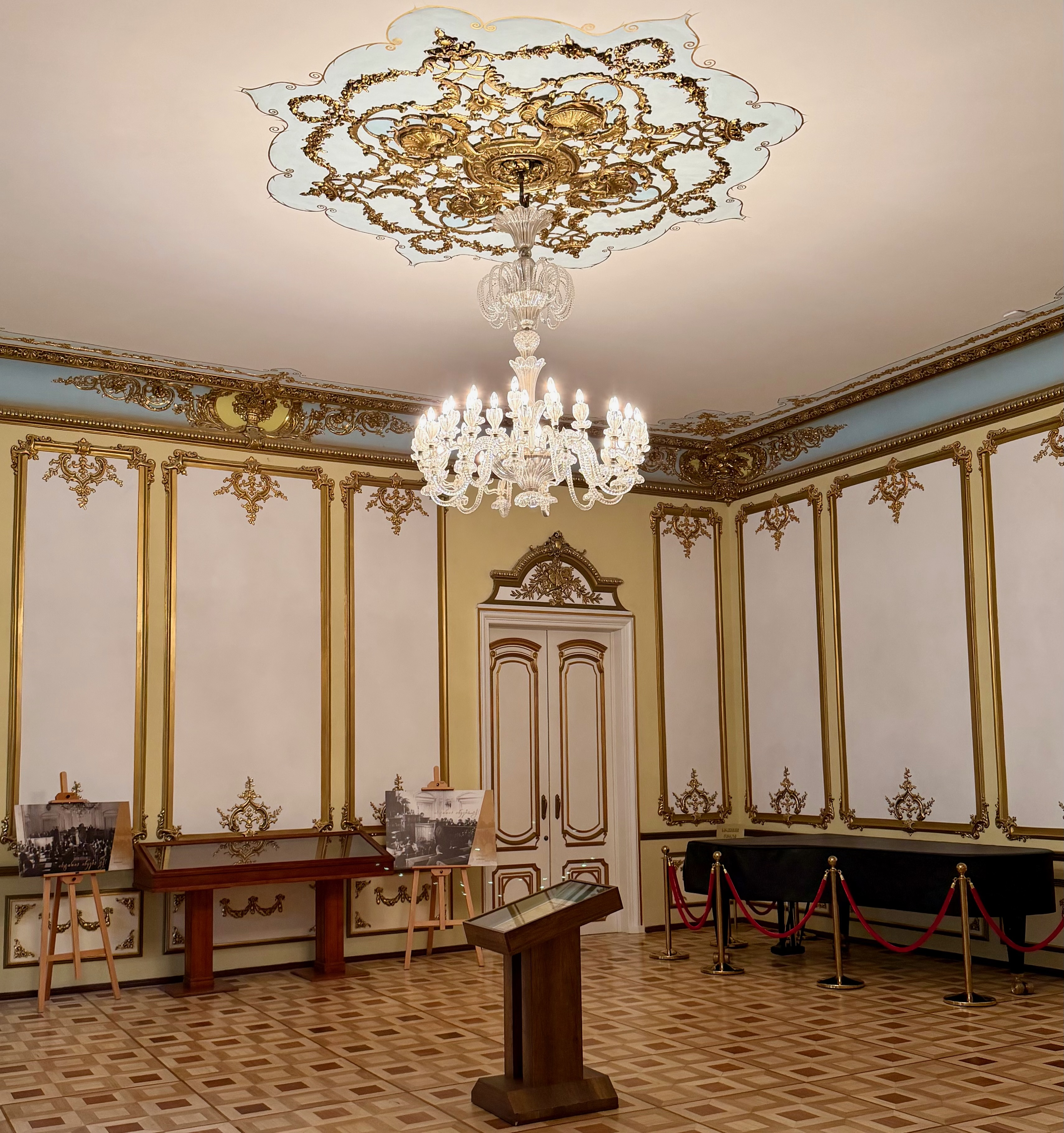
Hall in Tbilisi, where Georgia's independence was proclaimed in 1918

The Russian Revolution of October 1917 plunged Russia into a bloody civil war during which several outlying Russian territories declared independence. Georgia was one of them, proclaiming the establishment of the independent Democratic Republic of Georgia (DRG) on 26 May 1918. The new country was ruled by the Menshevik faction of the Social Democratic Party, which established a multi-party system in sharp contrast with the "dictatorship of the proletariat" established by the Bolsheviks in Russia. It was recognized by Soviet Russia (Treaty of Moscow (1920)) and the major Western powers in 1921.

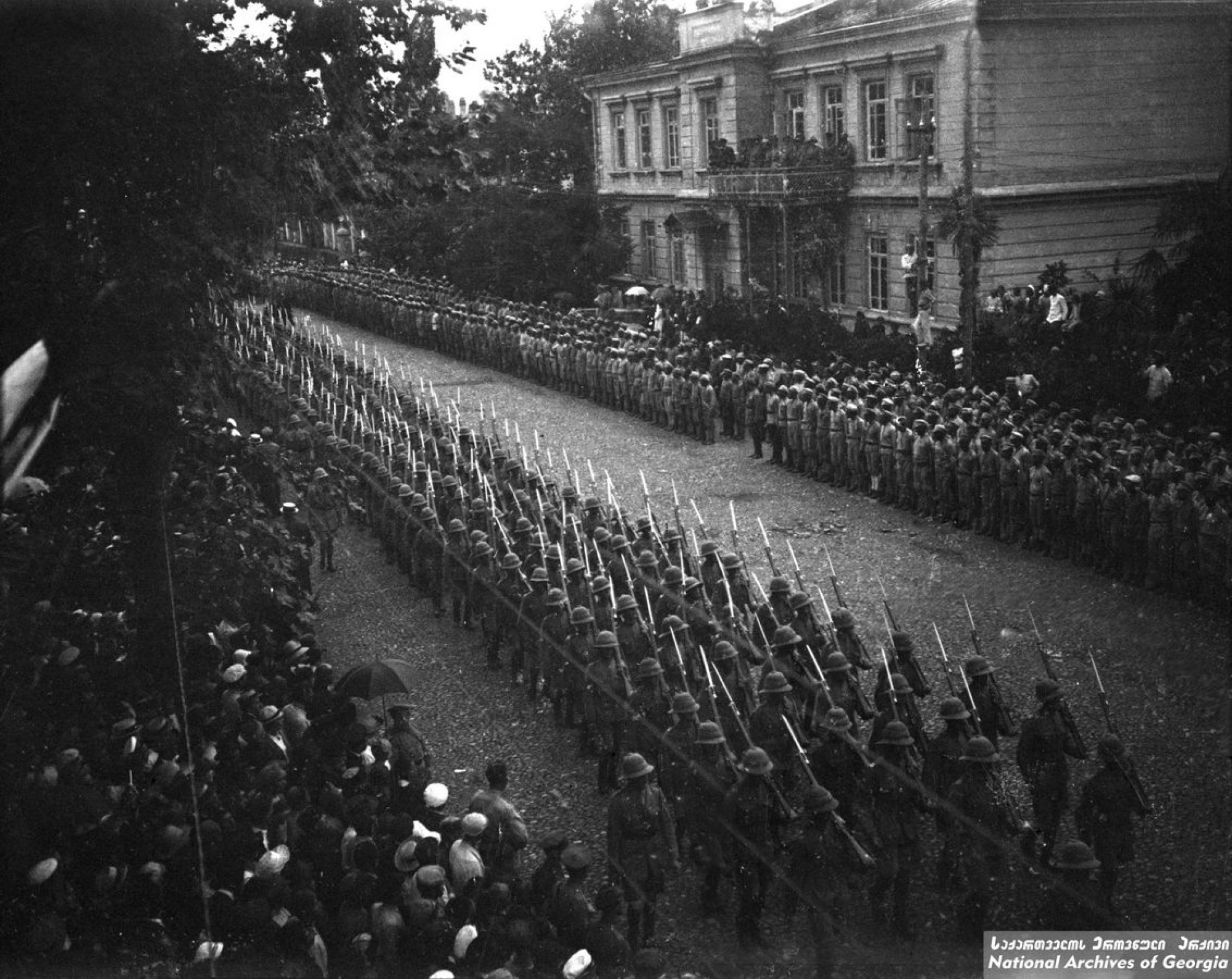
British troops marching in Batumi, Georgia in 1920. Following World War I, Britain replaced German troops in Georgia

==== Georgian–Armenian War (1918) ====
During the final stages of World War I, the Armenians and Georgians had been defending against the advance of the Ottoman Empire. In June 1918, in order to forestall an Ottoman advance on Tiflis, the Georgian troops controlled the Lori Province, which had an overwhelming Armenian population. After the Armistice of Mudros and the withdrawal of the Ottomans, the Georgian forces remained. Georgian Menshevik parliamentarian Irakli Tsereteli offered that the Armenians would be safer from the Turks as Georgian citizens. The Georgians offered a quadripartite conference including Georgia, Armenia, Azerbaijan, and the Mountainous Republic of the Northern Caucasus in order to resolve the issue, which the Armenians rejected. In December 1918, the Georgians were confronting a rebellion chiefly in the village of Uzunlar in the Lori region. Within days, hostilities commenced between the two republics.

The Georgian–Armenian War was a border war fought in 1918 between the Democratic Republic of Georgia and the Democratic Republic of Armenia over the parts of then disputed provinces of Lori, Javakheti but were largely populated by Armenians.

==== Red Army invasion (1921) ====
In February 1921, the Red Army invaded Georgia and after a short war occupied the country. The Georgian government was forced to flee. Guerrilla resistance in 1921–1924 was followed by a large-scale patriotic uprising in August 1924. Colonel Kakutsa Cholokashvili was one of the most prominent guerrilla leaders in this phase.

=== Georgian Soviet Socialist Republic (1921–1990) ===
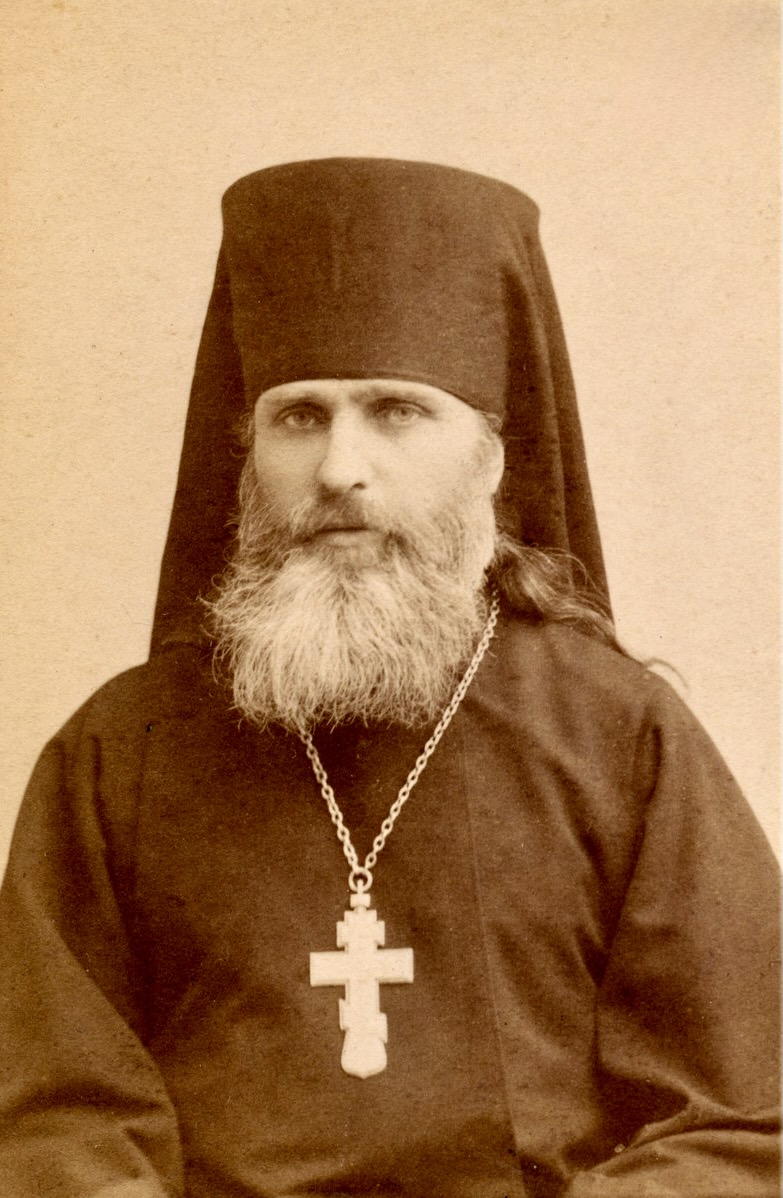
Ambrosius of Georgia opposed the Soviet regime, for which he faced repressions during the Red Terror

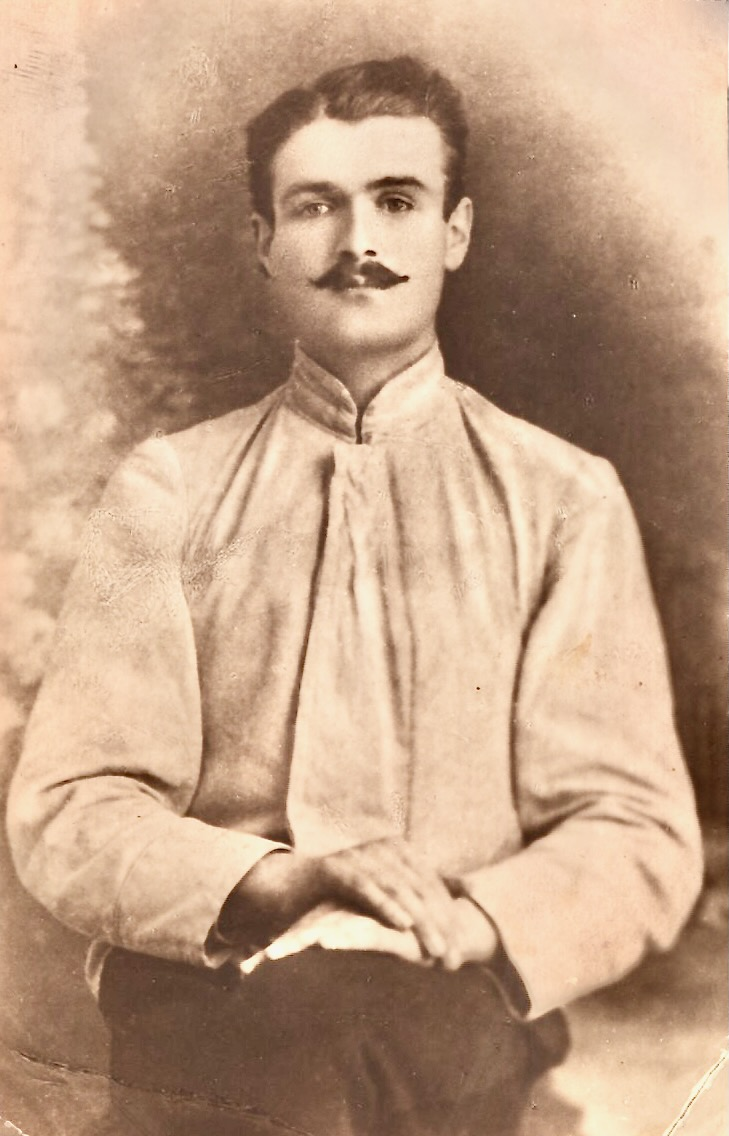
Jason Kereselidze, a National Hero of Georgia, one of many Georgians executed by the Soviets

During the Georgian Affair of 1922, Georgia was forcibly incorporated into the Transcaucasian SFSR comprising Armenia, Azerbaijan, and Georgia (including Abkhazia and South Ossetia). The Soviet Government forced Georgia to cede several areas to Turkey (the province of Tao-Klarjeti and part of Batumi province), Azerbaijan (the province of Hereti/Saingilo), Armenia (the Lore region) and Russia (northeastern corner of Khevi, eastern Georgia).

Georgia was spared the worst excesses of the collectivization which started in 1930. The rate of collectivization was also slow reaching 75% only in 1937.

Soviet rule was harsh: about 40,000 people were lost to the collectivization and purges under Stalin and his secret police chief, the Georgian Lavrenty Beria. In 1936, the TFSSR was dissolved and Georgia became the Georgian Soviet Socialist Republic.

Reaching the Caucasus oilfields was one of the main objectives of Adolf Hitler's invasion of the USSR in June 1941, but the armies of the Axis powers did not get as far as Georgia. The country contributed almost 550,000 fighters (300,000 were killed) to the Red Army, and was a vital source of textiles and munitions. However, a number of Georgians fought on the side of the German armed forces, forming the Georgian Legion.

During this period Stalin ordered the deportation of the Chechen, Ingush, Karachay and the Balkarian peoples from the Northern Caucasus; they were transported to Siberia and Central Asia for alleged collaboration with the Nazis. He abolished their respective autonomous republics. The Georgian SSR was briefly granted some of their territory until 1957.

Stalin's successful appeal for patriotic unity eclipsed Georgian nationalism during the war and diffused it in the years following. On 9 March 1956, about a hundred Georgians were killed when they demonstrated against Nikita Khrushchev's policy of de-Stalinization.

The decentralization program introduced by Khrushchev in the mid-1950s was soon exploited by Georgian Communist Party officials to build their own regional power base. A thriving pseudo-capitalist shadow economy emerged alongside the official state-owned economy. While the official growth rate of the economy of the Georgia was among the lowest in the USSR, such indicators as savings level, rates of car and house ownership were the highest in the Union, making Georgia one of the most economically successful Soviet republics. Corruption was at a high level. Among all the union republics, Georgia had the highest number of residents with high or special secondary education.

Although corruption was hardly unknown in the Soviet Union, it became so widespread and blatant in Georgia that it came to be an embarrassment to the authorities in Moscow. Eduard Shevardnadze, the country's interior minister between 1964 and 1972, gained a reputation as a fighter of corruption and engineered the removal of Vasil Mzhavanadze, the corrupt First Secretary of the Georgian Communist Party. Shevardnadze ascended to the post of First Secretary with the blessings of Moscow. He was an effective and able ruler of Georgia from 1972 to 1985, improving the official economy and dismissing hundreds of corrupt officials.

Soviet power and Georgian nationalism clashed in 1978 when Moscow ordered revision of the constitutional status of the Georgian language as Georgia's official state language. Bowing to pressure from mass street demonstrations on 14 April 1978, Moscow approved Shevardnadze's reinstatement of the constitutional guarantee the same year. 14 April was established as a Day of the Georgian Language.

=== Perestroika and Glasnost and Priority over Soviet Union laws ===
Shevardnadze's appointment as Soviet Foreign Minister in 1985 brought his replacement in Georgia by Jumber Patiashvili, a conservative and generally ineffective Communist who coped poorly with the challenges of perestroika. Towards the end of the late 1980s, increasingly violent clashes occurred between the Communist authorities, the resurgent Georgian nationalist movement and nationalist movements in Georgia's minority-populated regions (notably South Ossetia). On 9 April 1989, Soviet troops were used to break up a peaceful demonstration at the government building in Tbilisi. Twenty Georgians were killed and hundreds wounded and poisoned. The event radicalized Georgian politics, prompting many—even some Georgian communists—to conclude that independence was preferable to continued Soviet rule.

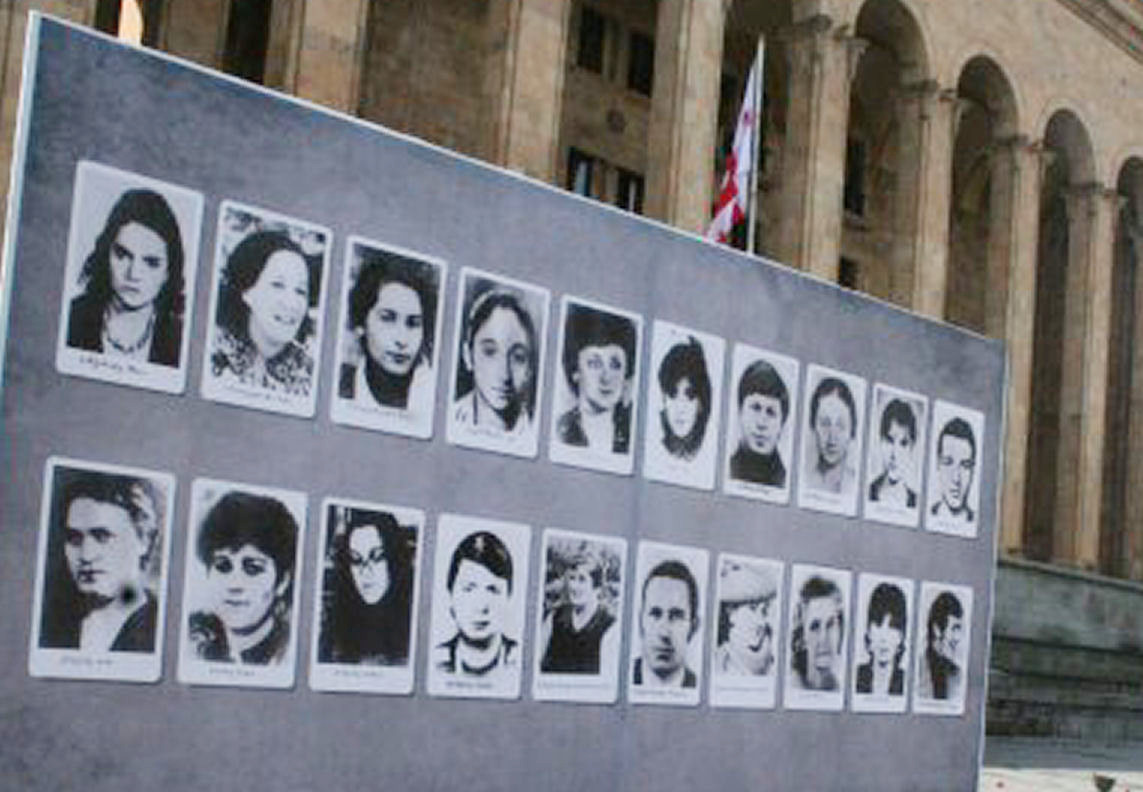
Photos of the 9 April 1989 Massacre victims (mostly young women) on billboard in Tbilisi

=== Independent Georgia ===
==== Legacy of the Soviet Union ====
Post-Soviet countries have signed a series of treaties and agreements to settle the legacy of the former Soviet Union multilaterally and bilaterally in the absence of Georgia's representatives. However, in 1993 Georgia joined the Commonwealth of Independent States, signing the Belovezha Accords, the CIS Charter and other agreements. Georgia withdrew from the CIS in 2009.

==== Gamsakhurdia presidency (1990–1992) ====
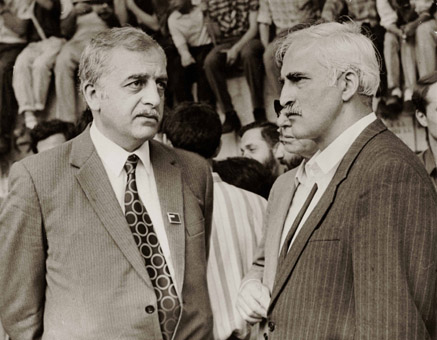
Leaders of Georgian independence movement in 1988, Zviad Gamsakhurdia (left) and Merab Kostava (right)

Opposition pressure on the communist government was manifested in popular demonstrations and strikes, which ultimately resulted in an open, multiparty and democratic parliamentary election being held on 28 October 1990 in which the Round Table—Free Georgia bloc received 54 percent of the proportional vote to gain 155 seats out of the 250 up for election, while the communists gained 64 seats and 30 percent of the proportional vote. This election was the first open multiparty election in the Soviet Union. The People's Front received 12 seats, the Democratic Georgia bloc received 4, and finally, the Liberation and Economic Revival bloc, and the All-Georgian Rustaveli Society only received 1 seat.

The leading dissident Zviad Gamsakhurdia became the head of the Supreme Council of the Republic of Georgia. The newly elected Supreme Council met for the first time on 14 November 1990, in a session highly anticipated throughout the nation and blessed by the Catholicos-Patriarch of All Georgia Ilia II. The Council immediately passed a number of important resolutions for the fate of the country, including the replacement of Soviet emblems with those of the Democratic Republic of Georgia, those being, the flag, coat of arms, and national anthem, and elected Zviad Gamsakhurdia, leader of Round Table—Free Georgia, as Chairman of the Supreme Council and, consequently, the country's Head of State. The very first law passed by the Supreme Council concerns the country's name, changing it from the Georgian Soviet Socialist Republic to the Republic of Georgia. The second law approved declares a national transition period of indefinite duration for Georgia, intended to prepare the nation for the restoration of state sovereignty.

On 31 March 1991, Gamsakhurdia organized a referendum on independence, which was approved by 98.9% of the votes. Formal independence from the Soviet Union was declared on 9 April 1991, although it took some time before it was widely recognized by outside powers such as the United States and European countries. Gamsakhurdia's government strongly opposed any vestiges of Russian dominance, such as the remaining Soviet military bases in the republic, and (after the dissolution of the Soviet Union) his government declined to join the Commonwealth of Independent States (CIS).

Gamsakhurdia was elected president on 26 May 1991, with 86% of the vote. He was subsequently accused by his opponents of "an erratic and authoritarian style of government", with nationalists and reformists joining forces in an uneasy anti-Gamsakhurdia coalition. A tense situation was worsened by the large amount of ex-Soviet weaponry available to the quarreling parties and by the growing power of paramilitary groups. The situation came to a head on 22 December 1991, when armed opposition groups launched a violent military coup d'état, besieging Gamsakhurdia and his supporters in government buildings in central Tbilisi. Gamsakhurdia managed to evade his enemies and fled to the breakaway Russian republic of Chechnya in January 1992.

==== Shevardnadze presidency (1992–2003) ====
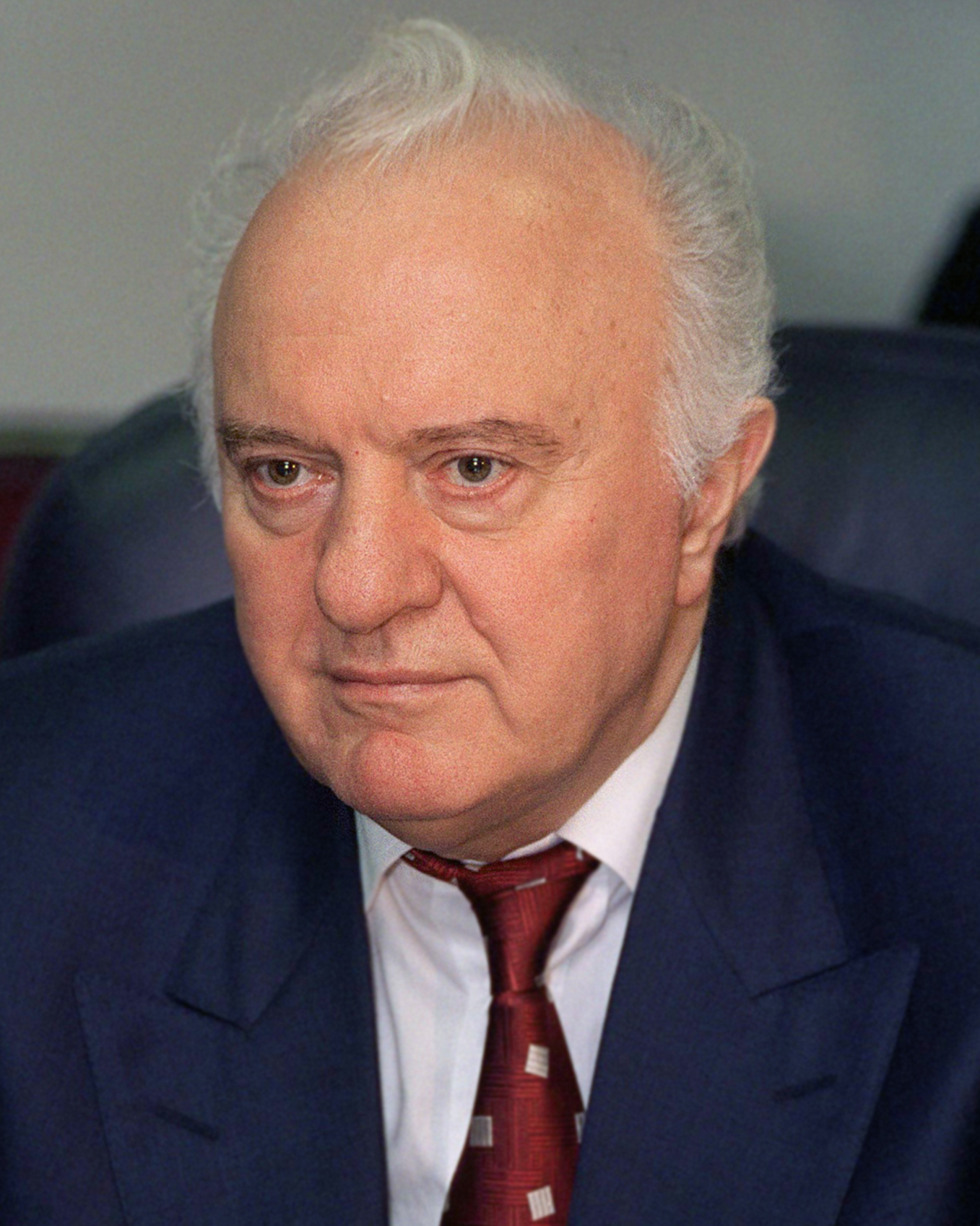
Eduard Shevardnadze, second President of Georgia (1995–2003)

The new government invited Eduard Shevardnadze to become the head of a State Council—in effect, president—in March 1992, following Gamsakhurdia's ouster. In August 1992, a separatist dispute in the Georgian autonomous republic of Abkhazia escalated when government forces and paramilitaries were sent into the area to quell separatist activities. The Abkhaz fought back with help from paramilitaries from Russia's North Caucasus regions and alleged covert support from the Russian military stationed in a base in Gudauta, Abkhazia and in September 1993 the government forces suffered a catastrophic defeat, which led to them being driven out and the entire Georgian population of the region being expelled. Around 14,000 people died and another 300,000 were forced to flee.

Ethnic violence also flared in South Ossetia but was eventually quelled, although at the cost of several hundred casualties and 100,000 refugees fleeing into Russian North Ossetia. In south-western Georgia, the autonomous republic of Adjara came under the control of Aslan Abashidze, who managed to rule his republic from 1991 to 2004 as a personal fiefdom in which the Tbilisi government had little influence.

On 24 September 1993, in the wake of the Abkhaz disaster, Zviad Gamsakhurdia returned from exile to organize an uprising against the government. His supporters were able to capitalize on the disarray of the government forces and quickly overran much of western Georgia. This alarmed Russia, Armenia and Azerbaijan, and units of the Russian Army were sent into Georgia to assist the government. Gamsakhurdia's rebellion quickly collapsed and he died on 31 December 1993, apparently after being cornered by his enemies. In a highly controversial agreement, Shevardnadze's government agreed that it would join the CIS as part of the price for military and political support.

Shevardnadze narrowly survived a bomb attack in August 1995 that he blamed on his erstwhile paramilitary allies. He took the opportunity to imprison the paramilitary leader Jaba Ioseliani and ban his Mkhedrioni militia in what was proclaimed as a strike against "mafia forces". However, his government—and his own family—became increasingly associated with pervasive corruption that hampered Georgia's economic growth. He won presidential elections in November 1995 and April 2000 with large majorities, but there were persistent allegations of vote-rigging.

The Baku–Tbilisi–Ceyhan pipeline project

The war in Chechnya caused considerable friction with Russia, which accused Georgia of harbouring Chechen guerrillas. Further friction was caused by Shevardnadze's close relationship with the United States, which saw him as a counterbalance to Russian influence in the strategic Transcaucasus region. Georgia became a major recipient of US foreign and military aid, signed a strategic partnership with NATO and declared an ambition to join both NATO and the EU. In 2002, the United States sent hundreds of Special Operations Forces to train the Military of Georgia—a program known as the Georgia Train and Equip Program. Perhaps most significantly, the country secured a $3 billion project for a Caspian-Mediterranean pipeline (Baku–Tbilisi–Ceyhan pipeline)

A powerful coalition of reformists headed by Mikheil Saakashvili and Zurab Zhvania united to oppose Shevardnadze's government in the November 2, 2003 parliamentary elections. The elections were widely regarded as blatantly rigged, including by OSCE observers; in response, the opposition organised massive demonstrations in the streets of Tbilisi. After two tense weeks, Shevardnadze resigned on 23 November 2003, and was replaced as president on an interim basis by Burjanadze.

These results were annulled by the Georgia Supreme Court after the Rose Revolution on 25 November 2003, following allegations of widespread electoral fraud and large public protests, which led to the resignation of Shevardnadze.

==== Saakashvili presidency (2004–2013) ====
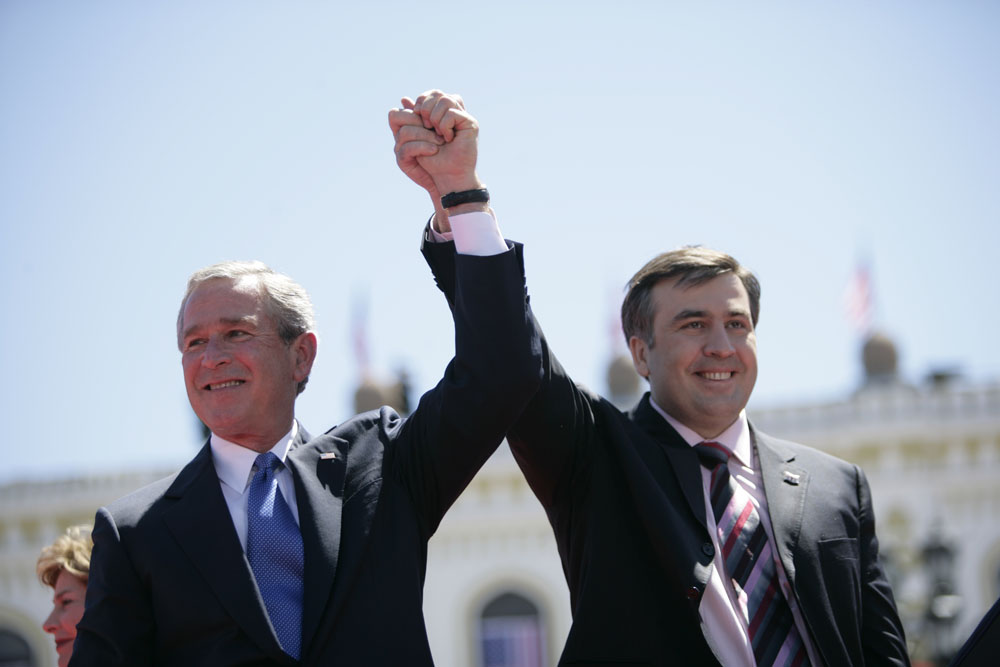
Mikheil Saakashvili with George W. Bush.

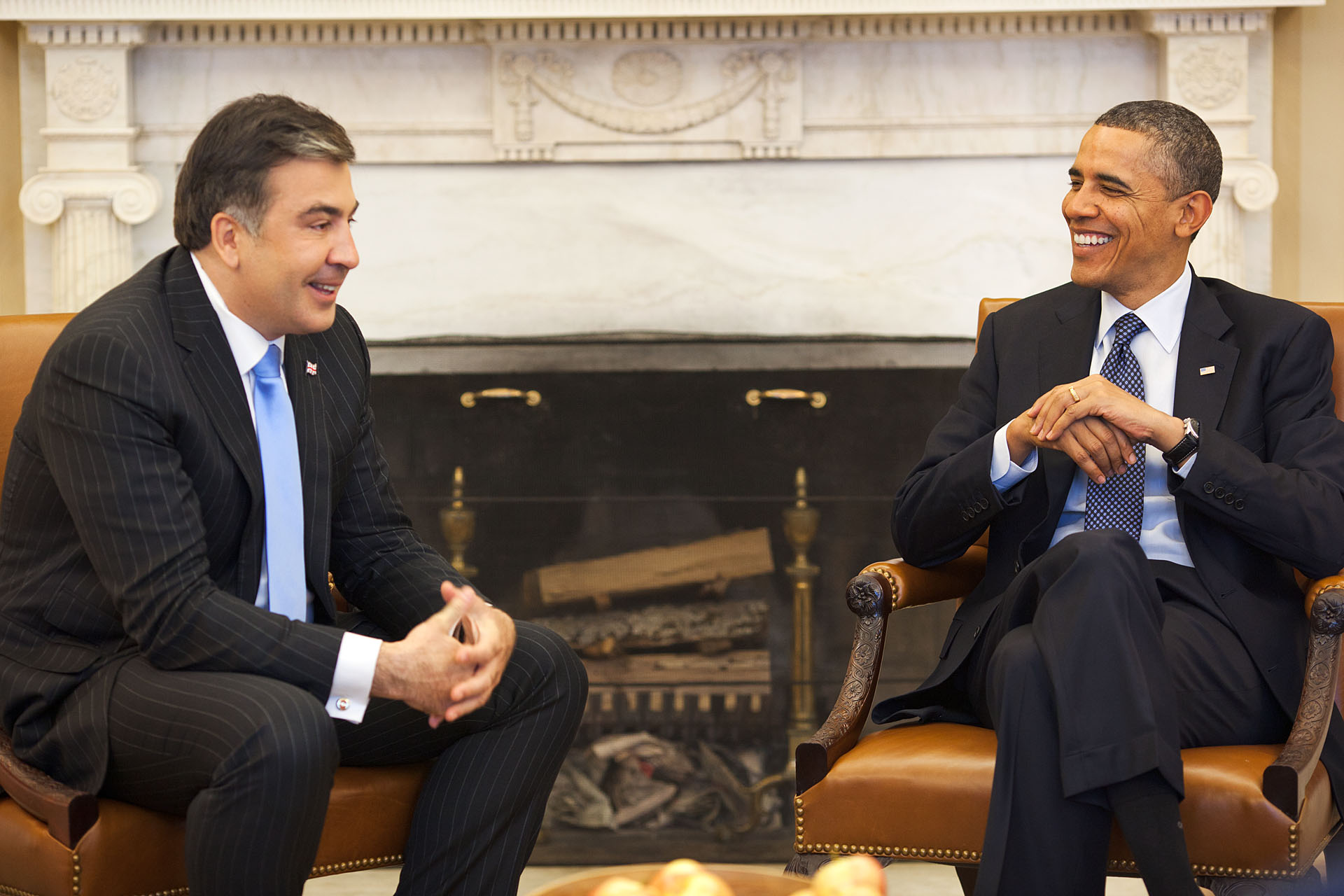
Presidents Barack Obama and Mikheil Saakashvili.

Location of Georgia (including Abkhazia and South Ossetia) and the Russian part of North Caucasus.

2004 elections

A new election was held on 28 March 2004. The National Movement – Democrats (NMD), the party supporting Mikheil Saakashvili, won 67% of the vote; only the Rightist Opposition (7.6%) also gained parliamentary representation passing the 7% threshold.

On 4 January, Mikheil Saakashvili won the Georgian presidential election, 2004 with an overwhelming majority of 96% of the votes cast. Constitutional amendments were rushed through Parliament in February strengthening the powers of the President to dismiss Parliament and creating the post of prime minister. Zurab Zhvania was appointed prime minister. Nino Burjanadze, the interim president, became Chairperson of the Parliament.

First term (2004–2007)

The new president faced many problems on coming to office. More than 230,000 internally displaced persons put an enormous strain on the economy. Peace in the separatist areas of Abkhazia and South Ossetia, overseen by Russian and United Nations peacekeepers in the framework of Organization for Security and Co-operation in Europe, remained fragile.

The Rose Revolution raised many expectations, both domestically and abroad. The new government was expected to bring democracy, ending a period of widespread corruption and government inefficiency; and to complete state-building by re-asserting sovereignty over the whole Georgian territory. Both aims were very ambitious; the new ruling elite initiated a process of concentration of power in the hands of the executive, in order to use the revolutionary mandate to change the country. In fact, the Saakashvili government initially achieved impressive results in strengthening the capacity of the state and toppling corruption. Georgia's ranking in the Corruption Perceptions Index by Transparency International improved dramatically from rank 133 in 2004 to 67 in 2008 and to 51 in 2012, surpassing several EU countries. But such achievements could only result from the use of unilateral executive powers, failing to achieve consent and initiating a trade-off between democracy-building and state-building.

After the Rose Revolution, relations between the Georgian government and semi-separatist Ajarian leader Aslan Abashidze deteriorated rapidly, with Abashidze rejecting Saakashvili's demands for the writ of the Tbilisi government to run in Adjara. Both sides mobilized forces in apparent preparations for a military confrontation. Saakashvili's ultimatums and massive street demonstrations forced Abashidze to resign and flee Georgia (2004 Adjara crisis).

Relations with Russia remained problematic due to Russia's continuing political, economic and military support to separatist governments in Abkhazia and South Ossetia. Russian troops still remained garrisoned at two military bases and as peacekeepers in these regions. Saakashvili's public pledge to resolve the matter provoked criticism from the separatist regions and Russia. In August 2004, several clashes occurred in South Ossetia.

On 29 October 2004, the North Atlantic Council (NAC) of NATO approved the Individual Partnership Action Plan of Georgia (IPAP), making Georgia the first among NATO's partner countries to manage this task successfully.

Georgia supported the coalition forces in Iraq War. On 8 November 2004, 300 extra Georgian troops were sent to Iraq. The Georgian government committed to send a total of 850 troops to Iraq to serve in the protection forces of the UN Mission. Along with increasing Georgian troops in Iraq, the US will train additional 4 thousand Georgian soldiers within frames of the Georgia Train-and-Equip Program (GTEP).

In February 2005 Prime Minister Zurab Zhvania died, and Zurab Nogaideli was appointed as the new prime minister. Saakashvili remained under significant pressure to deliver on his promised reforms. Organizations such as Amnesty International have pushed serious concerns over human rights. Discontent over unemployment, pensions and corruption, and the continuing dispute over Abkhazia, have greatly diminished Saakashvili's popularity in the country.

In 2006 Georgia's relationship with Russia was at nadir due to the Georgian–Russian espionage controversy and related events. In 2007, a political crisis led to serious anti-government protests, and Russia allegedly led a series of airspace violations against Georgia.

2007 crisis

Since the weakening of the democratic credentials of the Saakashvili cabinet after the police crackdown of the 2007 protests, the government has put the stress on his successful economic reforms. Kakha Bendukidze was pivotal in the libertarian reforms launched under Saakashvili, including one of the least restrictive labor codes, the lowest flat income tax rates (12%) and some of the lowest customs rates worldwide, along with the drastic reduction of necessary licenses and permits for business. The objective of the Georgian elite switched to the aim of "a functioning democracy with the highest possible level of economic liberties", as expressed by the prime minister Lado Gurgenidze.

Saakashvili called new parliamentary and presidential elections for January 2008. In order to contest the presidential election, Saakashvili announced his resignation effective 25 November 2007, with Nino Burjanadze becoming acting president for a second time (until the election returned Saakashvili to office on 20 January 2008).

Second term (2008–2013)

In August 2008 Russia and Georgia engaged in the 2008 South Ossetia war. Its aftermath, leading to the 2008–2010 Georgia–Russia crisis, is still tense.

The 2012 parliamentary elections

In October 2011 famous Georgian tycoon Bidzina Ivanishvili admitted his entrance to politics of Georgia. In December he established opposition political movement Georgian Dream and announced his desire to take part in the 2012 parliamentary elections. In February 2012 they formed coalition with Republican Party of Georgia, Free Democrats, National Forum and Industry Will Save Georgia. Tensions rose during pre-election campaign, whereas many leaders of opposition were arrested. 54% of electorate voted in favor of the newly formed coalition, thus Georgia Dream obtained 65 seats in parliament.

In October 2012, Saakashvili admitted defeat for his party in parliamentary elections. In his speech he said that "the opposition has the lead and it should form the government – and I as president should help them with this". This represented the first democratic transition of power in Georgia's post-Soviet history.

==== Margvelashvili presidency (2013–2018) ====
On 17 November 2013, Giorgi Margvelashvili won the Georgian presidential election, 2013 with 62.12% of the votes cast. With this, a new constitution came into effect which devolved significant power from the president to the prime minister. Margvelashvili's inauguration was not attended by his predecessor Mikheil Saakashvili, who cited disrespect by the new government towards its predecessors and opponents.

Margvelashvili initially refused to move to the luxurious presidential palace built under Saakashvili in Tbilisi, opting for more modest quarters in the building of the State Chancellery until a 19th-century building once occupied by the U.S. embassy in Georgia is refurbished for him. However, he later started to occasionally use the palace for official ceremonies. This was one of the reasons for which Margvelashvili was publicly criticized, in a March 2014 interview with Imedi TV, by the ex-Prime Minister Ivanishvili, who said he was "disappointed" in Margvelashvili.

In October 2016, the ruling party, Georgian Dream, won the parliamentary election with 48.61 percent of the vote and the opposition United National Movement (UNM) 27.04 percent. Georgian Dream came to power in 2012, ending UNM's nine-year rule. It was funded by tycoon Bidzina Ivanishvili, the country's richest man and party chief, while the opposition UNM was founded by former president Mikheil Saakashvili.

==== Zurabishvili presidency (2018–2024) ====
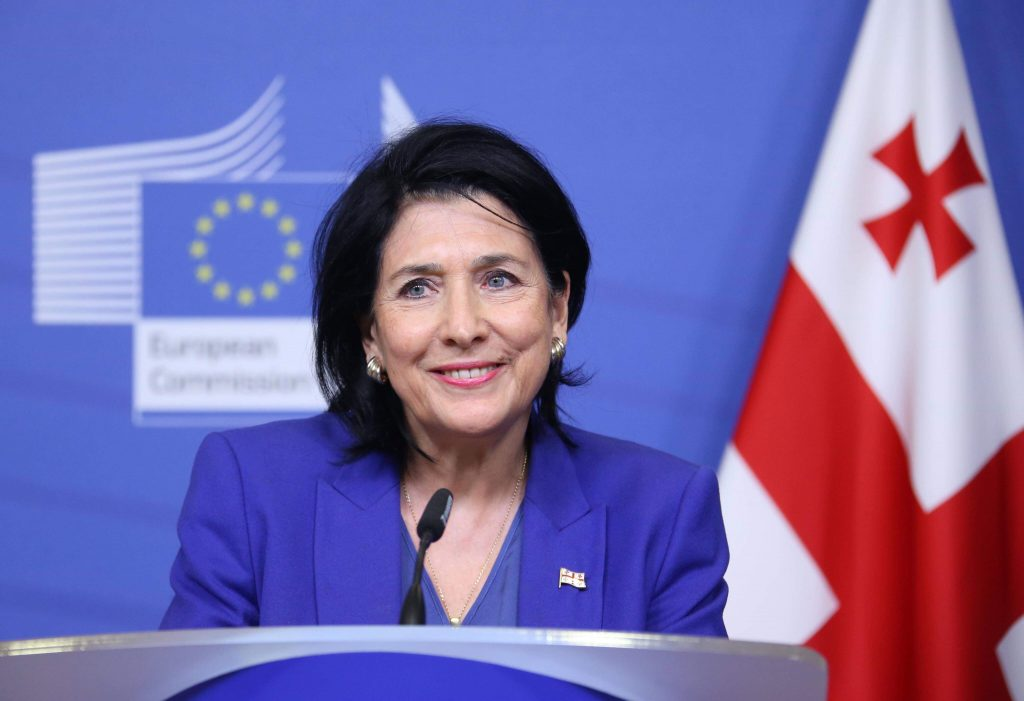
President Zourabichvili

In November 2018, Salome Zourabichvili won Georgia's presidential election, becoming the first woman to hold the office. She was backed by the ruling Georgian Dream party. However, the new constitution made the role of president largely ceremonial. It was the last direct election of a Georgian president, as the country switched to a parliamentary system.

On 31 October 2020, the ruling Georgian Dream, led by Bidzina Ivanishvili, secured over 48% of votes in the parliamentary election. It gave the party the right to form the country's next government and continue governing alone. The opposition made accusations of fraud, which the Georgian Dream denied. Thousands of people gathered outside the Central Election Commission to demand a new vote.

In February 2021, Irakli Garibashvili became the prime minister of Georgia, following the resignation of Prime Minister Giorgi Gakharia. Prime Minister Irakli Garibashviliis, who had an earlier term as prime minister in 2013–15, is a close ally of the powerful founder of the ruling Georgian Dream party, Bidzina Ivanishvili.

On 1 October 2021, former president Mikheil Saakashvili was arrested on his return from exile. Saakashvili led the country from 2004 to 2013 but was later convicted in absentia on corruption charges, which he denied.

Since the Russia's invasion of Ukraine in 2022, about 1.5 million Russian citizens have crossed the Russia-Georgia border. Many of them fled the 2022 Russian mobilization. It is not exactly known how many of those Russians have stayed in Georgia. However, their presence is evident, causing worry for many Georgians.

On 14 December 2023, the European Union granted Georgia candidate status, acknowledging the nation's ongoing efforts toward EU integration. The decision, announced by the European Council, came alongside the initiation of accession negotiations with Eastern Partnership members Ukraine and Moldova. Georgia's application for EU membership in March 2022, prompted by Russia's invasion of Ukraine, was initially met with a denial of candidate status in June 2022. The council outlined 12 priorities for Georgia to address before reconsidering its candidacy. Despite limited progress on these recommendations, the EU's decision reflected an ongoing commitment to fostering diplomatic relations with Georgia and advancing the nation's EU integration aspirations.

In February 2024, former ruling party leader Irakli Kobakhidze became Georgia's new prime minister. His predecessor resigned in order to lead the ruling party to next elections.

In April 2024, tens of thousands of people demonstrated in Georgia to protest against a "foreign influence" bill requiring any civil society group and media organization receiving more than 20 percent of its funding from abroad to register as an "organisation pursuing the interests of a foreign power".

After the 26 October 2024 Georgian Parliamentary election the International Observer Mission (EU and OSCE among others) raised concerns about its validity.

== See also ==
- History of the Caucasus
- List of the Kings of Georgia
- List of Georgian battles
- List of historical states of Georgia

== Bibliography ==
- Allen, William E.D. (2024) [1932]. A History of the Georgian People From the Beginning Down to the Russian Conquest in the Nineteenth Century. Routledge. ISBN 9781032436890.
- Ammon, Philipp: Georgien zwischen Eigenstaatlichkeit und russischer Okkupation: Die Wurzeln des russisch-georgischen Konflikts vom 18. Jahrhundert bis zum Ende der ersten georgischen Republik (1921) [Georgia between statehood and Russian occupation: The roots of the Russian-Georgian conflict from the 18th century to the end of the first Georgian republic (1921)]. Klagenfurt 2015, ISBN 978-3902878458.
- Anchabadze, George (2005). History of Georgia: A Short Sketch. ISBN 99928-71-59-8.
- Assatiani, N. and Bendianachvili, A.: Histoire de la Géorgie [History of Georgia]. Paris, 1997
- Avalov, Zurab (1906). Prisoedinenie Gruzii k Rossii. St. Petersburg: Montvid.
- Braund, David (1994). Georgia in antiquity: a history of Colchis and Transcaucasian Iberia 550 BC – AD 562. Oxford University Press. doi:10.1093/oso/9780198144731.001.0001. ISBN 9780198144731.
- Bremmer, Jan, & Taras, Ray, "New States, New Politics: Building the Post-Soviet Nations", Cambridge University Press, 1997.
- Burney, Charles; Lang, David M. (2001). The Peoples of the Hills: Ancient Ararat and Caucasus. Phoenix Press.
- Dowling, Theodore E. (1912). Sketches of Georgian Church History. Society for Promoting Christian Literature.
- Gvosdev, Nikolas K. (2000). Imperial policies and perspectives towards Georgia: 1760–1819. St. Martin's Press / St Antony's College, Oxford. ISBN 0-312-22990-9.
- Iosseliani, P.: The Concise History of Georgian Church, 1883.
- Lang, David M. (1957). The last years of the Georgian Monarchy: 1658–1832. New York City: Columbia University Press.
- Lang, David M. (1962). A Modern History of Soviet Georgia. Grove Press.
- Lang, David M. (1966). The Georgians.
- Manvelichvili, A: Histoire de la Georgie [History of Georgia]. Paris, 1955
- Mikaberidze, Alexander (2015). Historical Dictionary of Georgia (2nd ed.). Rowman & Littlefield. ISBN 9781442241459.
- Rayfield, Donald (2012). Edge of Empires: A History of Georgia. Reaktion Books. ISBN 9781780230306.
- Salia, Kalistrat (1983). History of the Georgian nation. Madison: University of Wisconsin.
- Sevim, Ali; Yücel, Yaşar (1991). Türkiye tarihi [History of Turkey]. Vol. I. İstanbul: AKDTYKTTK Yayınları.
- Steele, Jon. "War Junkie: One Man's Addiction to the Worst Places on Earth" Corgi (2002). ISBN 0-552-14984-5.
- Suny, Ronald G. (1994) [1988]. The Making of the Georgian Nation (2nd ed.). Indiana University Press. ISBN 0253209153.
- Toumanoff, Cyril (1967) [1963]. Studies in Christian Caucasian History. Georgetown University Press.
