= Gromada (disambiguation) =

A gromada is a former Polish unit of local government.

- Gromada Osiek
- Gromada Tursko Wielkie

Gromada may also refer to:

- Gromada (video game), a 2000 video game
- Gromada, Gmina Tarnawatka, Tomaszów County in Lublin Voivodeship (east Poland)
- Gromada, Biłgoraj County in Lublin Voivodeship (east Poland)
- Thaddeus Gromada, Polish-American historian

== See also ==
- Hramada, cognate term in Belarus
- Hromada, cognate term in Ukraine
- Hromada (disambiguation)
