= Dissolution of the Soviet Union =

1988–1991 breakup of the sovereign state

Dissolution of the Soviet Union (Note: Russian: Распад Советского Союза, romanized: Raspád Sovétskogo Soyúza, also negatively connoted as Russian: Развал Советского Союза, romanized: Razvál Sovétskogo Soyúza, Ruining of the Soviet Union.)
- Part of the Cold War and the Revolutions of 1989
- Between 1990 and 1991, all 15 union republics (including the Russian SFSR itself) broke away from the Soviet Union.
- Date: 16 November 1988 – 26 December 1991 (3 years, 1 month, and 10 days)
- Location: Soviet Union; Post-Soviet states: Russia, Ukraine, Belarus,^{[a]}; Lithuania, Latvia, Estonia, Moldova,^{[c]}; Georgia, Armenia, Azerbaijan, Kazakhstan, Turkmenistan,^{[d]}; Uzbekistan; Tajikistan, Kyrgyzstan,^{[b]}; Self-proclaimed breakaway states:^{[e]}; Abkhazia (1992–present), Artsakh (1991–2023), Ichkeria (1991–2000), Crimea (1992; 2014), Gagauzia (1990–1995), Karakalpakstan (1990–1993), Nakhchivan (1990), South Ossetia (1990–present), Tatarstan (1990–1994; disputed), Transnistria (1990–present)
- Cause: Causes of the dissolution: Primary causes; Era of Stagnation; Ethnic tensions within the Soviet Union; Glasnost and perestroika policies; Economic and political stalemate, especially in the Warsaw Pact; Anti-communist, anti-CPSU, and pro-Western demonstrations in Soviet satellite states
- Participants: Governments of the union republics; Governments of the autonomous republics; Nationalist and liberal opposition
- Outcome: List: Dissolution of the Soviet Union into 15 independent states; End of CPSU rule; Establishment of the Commonwealth of Independent States between eleven independent states; Several separatist movements in the former autonomies prove unsuccessful, with most either failing to combat the militaries of their respective republics or agreeing to rejoin them peacefully; Numerous military conflicts and ethnic clashes unfold during and after the dissolution, provoking humanitarian crises and leaving many internally displaced; Republics declare multi-party presidential or semi-presidential systems; Republics move to adopt capitalist market economy; Ruble zone active in most of the new states between 1991 and 1994, with national currencies adopted later; Unified Soviet Armed Forces divided c. 1992–1993; Black Sea Fleet dispute between Russia and Ukraine from 1992 to 1997 and its partition in 1997.; Lease of Sevastopol Naval Base to Russia, terminated in 2014; Issues with value loss of savings of former Soviet citizens; Issues with social and medical support for veterans of the Soviet–Afghan War; Relocation of the Soviet Armed Forces from East Germany and the rest of Central Europe; Economic support to North Korea had stopped; Start of the Special Period in Cuba; End of the Cold War with Western Bloc victory; Decline of communist and far-left movements around the world; China remains as the world's most populous communist state; The United States becomes the world's sole superpower
- Then romanized as Byelorussia (Russian: Белоруссия). Then romanized as Kirghizia (Russian: Киргизия). Then romanized as Moldavia (Russian: Молдавия). Then romanized as Turkmenia (Russian: Туркмения). States in bold still exist to this present day.

On 26 December 1991, the Soviet Union was formally dissolved and ceased to exist as a sovereign state. It also brought an end to the Soviet Union's federal government and to Soviet leader Mikhail Gorbachev's efforts to reform the Soviet political and economic system in an attempt to stop a period of political and economic stagnation.

The collapse of the Soviet Union in 1991 resulted from several factors: chronic economic stagnation, the unsustainable financial burden of the arms race with the United States and foreign conflicts, intense ethnic nationalism and separatism within its union republics, and the destabilizing effects of Gorbachev's reforms (particularly glasnost and perestroika).

The process began with growing unrest in the country's union republics developing into an incessant political and legislative conflict between them and the central government. Until its final years, the Soviet Union was made up of 15 union republics that served as the homelands of different ethnic groups. Estonia was the first union republic to declare state sovereignty on 16 November 1988. Lithuania was the first republic to declare independence, in March 1990.

During the failed 1991 August coup, communist hardliners attempted to overthrow Gorbachev and reverse his reforms. However, the turmoil caused the central government in Moscow to lose influence, ultimately leading many republics to declare independence in the following days and months. On 8 December 1991, the leaders of its three founding republics—the Russian SFSR, the Byelorussian SSR, and the Ukrainian SSR—signed the Belovezha Accords and declared that the Soviet Union no longer existed. Eight more republics joined the declaration shortly thereafter. The Belovezha Accords also established the Commonwealth of Independent States (CIS) to replace the Soviet Union as a community. Kazakhstan was the last republic to declare independence, on 16 December. All post-Soviet states, with the exception of Georgia and the Baltic states, joined the CIS on 21 December by signing the Alma-Ata Protocol. Russia, as by far the largest and most populous republic, became the Soviet Union's recognized successor state.

On 25 December 1991, Gorbachev resigned and transferred his presidential powers—including control of the nuclear launch codes—to Russian president Boris Yeltsin. That evening, the Soviet flag was lowered from the Moscow Kremlin for the last time and replaced with the Russian tricolor. The following day, the Soviet of the Republics, the upper chamber of the Supreme Soviet of the Soviet Union, formally dissolved the Soviet Union by adopting Declaration No. 142-N. The dissolution marked the culmination of the Revolutions of 1989 and the end of the Cold War.

In the aftermath of the Cold War, several of the post-Soviet states have retained close links with Russia and formed multilateral organizations such as the CIS and the Collective Security Treaty Organization (CSTO). A few, notably the Baltic states, moved out of the Russian sphere of influence and towards the West.

== Background ==
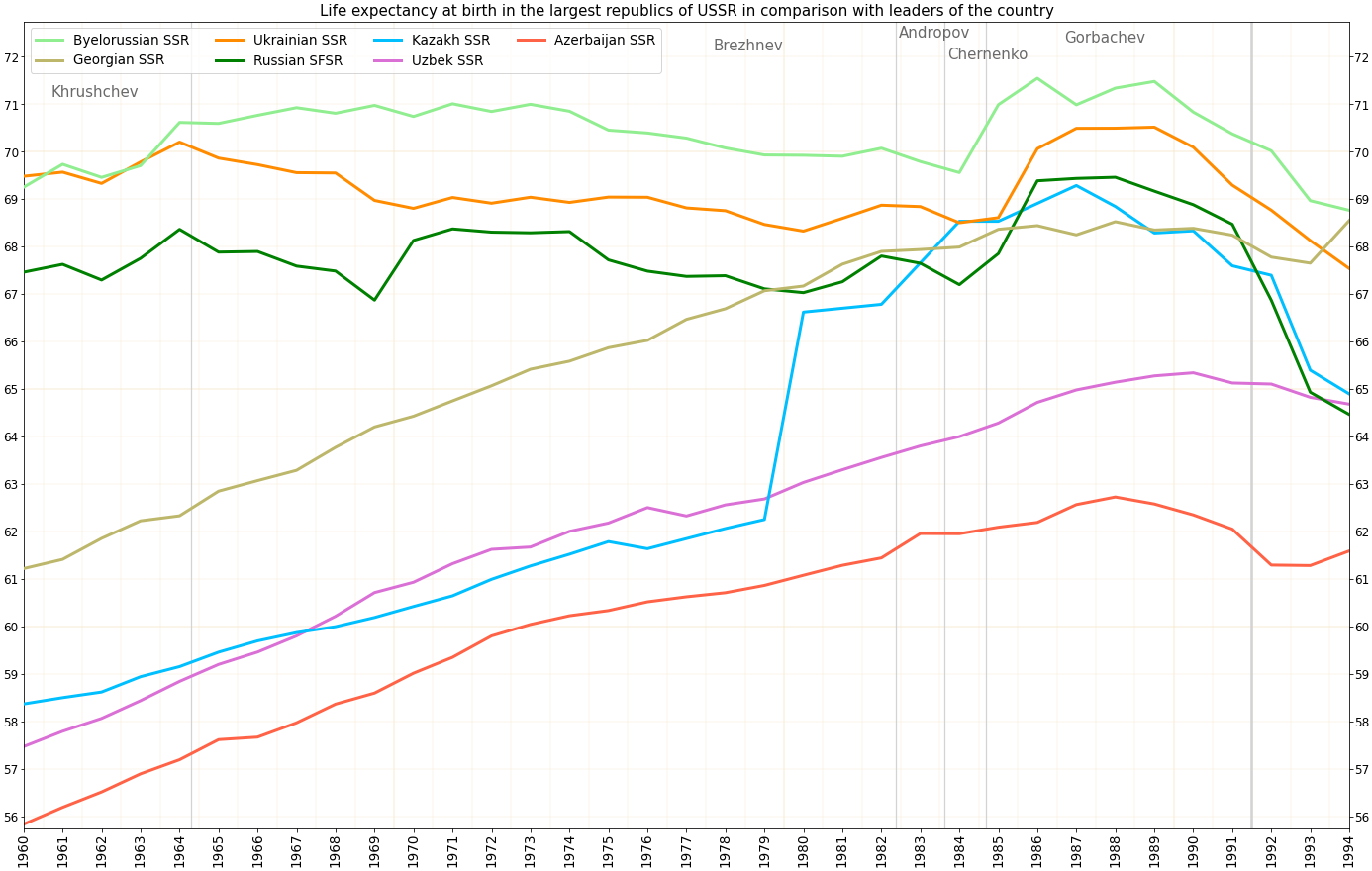
Change of life expectancy in the largest republics of the Soviet Union before its dissolution

=== 1985: Gorbachev elected ===
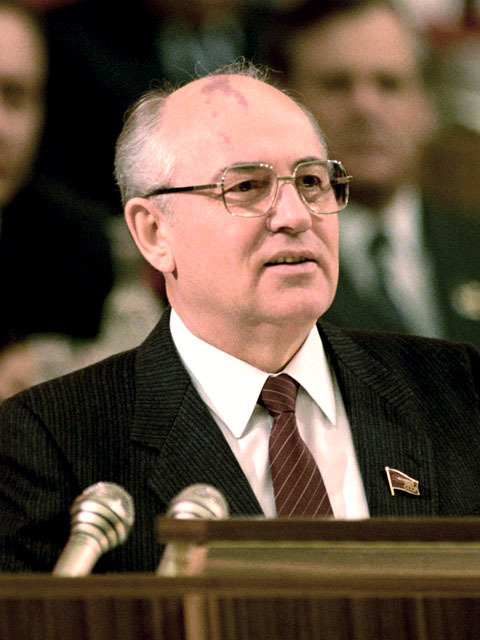
Mikhail Gorbachev in 1987

Mikhail Gorbachev was elected General Secretary by the Politburo on 11 March 1985, just over four hours after his predecessor Konstantin Chernenko died at the age of 73. Gorbachev, aged 54, was the youngest member of the Politburo. His initial goal as general secretary was to revive the stagnating Soviet economy, and he realized that doing so would require reforming underlying political and social structures. The reforms began with personnel changes of senior Brezhnev-era officials who would impede political and economic change. On 23 April 1985, Gorbachev brought two protégés, Yegor Ligachev and Nikolai Ryzhkov, into the Politburo as full members. He kept the "power" ministries favorable by promoting KGB Chief Viktor Chebrikov from candidate to full member and appointing Minister of Defence Marshal Sergei Sokolov as a Politburo candidate. The freedom of speech brought by Gorbachev's reforms allowed nationalist movements and ethnic disputes within the Soviet Union to be expressed and grow into dominant political movements. It also led indirectly to the revolutions of 1989 in which Soviet-imposed socialist regimes of the Warsaw Pact were toppled peacefully (with the notable exception of Romania), which in turn increased pressure on Gorbachev to introduce greater democracy and autonomy for the Soviet Union's constituent republics. Under Gorbachev's leadership, the Communist Party of the Soviet Union (CPSU) in 1989 introduced limited competitive elections to a new central legislature, the Congress of People's Deputies (although the ban on other political parties was not lifted until 1990).

On 1 July 1985, Gorbachev sidelined his main rival by removing Grigory Romanov from the Politburo and brought Boris Yeltsin into the Central Committee Secretariat. On 23 December 1985, Gorbachev appointed Yeltsin First Secretary of the Moscow Communist Party, replacing Viktor Grishin.

=== 1986: Sakharov returns ===
Gorbachev continued to press for greater liberalization. On 23 December 1986 Andrei Sakharov, the most prominent Soviet dissident, returned to Moscow shortly after receiving a personal telephone call from Gorbachev telling him that after almost seven years his internal exile for defying the authorities was over.

=== 1987: One-party democracy ===
At the 28–30 January Central Committee plenum, Gorbachev suggested a new policy of demokratizatsiya, or "democratization", throughout Soviet society. He proposed that future Communist Party elections should offer a choice between multiple candidates, elected by secret ballot. However, the party delegates at the Plenum watered down Gorbachev's proposal, and democratic choice within the Communist Party was never significantly implemented.

Gorbachev also radically expanded the scope of glasnost, and stated that no subject was off limits for open discussion in the media. On 7 February, dozens of political prisoners were freed in the first group release since the Khrushchev thaw in the mid-1950s.

On 10 September, Boris Yeltsin wrote a letter of resignation to Gorbachev. At the 27 October plenary meeting of the Central Committee, Yeltsin, frustrated that Gorbachev had not addressed any of the issues outlined in his resignation letter, criticized the slow pace of reform, and servility to the general secretary. In his reply, Gorbachev accused Yeltsin of "political immaturity" and "absolute irresponsibility".

Nevertheless, news of Yeltsin's insubordination and "secret speech" spread, and soon samizdat versions began to circulate. That marked the beginning of Yeltsin's rebranding as a rebel and rise in popularity as an anti-establishment figure. The following four years of political struggle between Yeltsin and Gorbachev played a large role in the dissolution of the Soviet Union. On 11 November, Yeltsin was fired from the post of First Secretary of the Moscow City Committee of the Communist Party of the Soviet Union.

=== Protest activity (1986–1987) ===
In the years leading up to the dissolution, various protests and resistance movements occurred or took hold throughout the Soviet Union, which were variously suppressed or tolerated.

In the Baltics, several protest groups were established against Soviet rule, such as Helsinki-86, the Popular Front of Latvia, Sąjūdis (Lithuania), and the Popular Front of Estonia. Helsinki-86 was the first openly anti-Communist organization in the Soviet Union, and the first openly organized opposition to the Soviet regime, setting an example for other ethnic minorities' pro-independence movements.

On 26 December 1986, 300 Latvian youths gathered in Riga's Cathedral Square and marched down Lenin Avenue toward the Freedom Monument, shouting, "Soviet Russia out! Free Latvia!" Security forces confronted the marchers, and several police vehicles were overturned.

The Jeltoqsan ('December') of 1986 were riots in Alma-Ata, Kazakhstan, sparked by Gorbachev's dismissal of Dinmukhamed Kunaev, the First Secretary of the Communist Party of Kazakhstan and an ethnic Kazakh, who was replaced with Gennady Kolbin, an outsider from the Russian SFSR. Demonstrations started in the morning of 17 December 1986, with 200 to 300 students in front of the Central Committee building on Brezhnev Square. On the next day, 18 December, protests turned into civil unrest as clashes between troops, volunteers, militia units, and Kazakh students turned into a wide-scale confrontation. The clashes could only be controlled on the third day.

On 6 May 1987, Pamyat, a Russian nationalist group, held an unsanctioned demonstration in Moscow. The authorities did not break up the demonstration and even kept traffic out of the demonstrators' way while they marched to an impromptu meeting with Boris Yeltsin.

On 14 June 1987, about 5,000 people gathered again at Freedom Monument in Riga, and laid flowers to commemorate the anniversary of Stalin's mass deportation of Latvians in 1941. The authorities did not crack down on demonstrators, which encouraged more and larger demonstrations throughout the Baltic States. On 18 November 1987, hundreds of police and civilian militiamen cordoned off the central square to prevent any demonstration at Freedom Monument, but thousands lined the streets of Riga in silent protest regardless.

On 25 July 1987, 300 Crimean Tatars staged a noisy demonstration near the Kremlin Wall for several hours, calling for the right to return to their homeland, from which they were deported in 1944; police and soldiers looked on.

On 23 August 1987, the 48th anniversary of the secret protocols of the 1939 Molotov Pact, thousands of demonstrators marked the occasion in the three Baltic capitals to sing independence songs and attend speeches commemorating Stalin's victims. The gatherings were sharply denounced in the official press and closely watched by the police but were not interrupted.

On 17 October 1987, a protest held in Armenia SSR was underway. The following day 1,000 Armenians participated in another demonstration calling for Armenian national rights in Karabakh, and the proposed unification of both Nakhchivan and Nagorno-Karabakh to Armenia. The police tried to physically prevent the march and after a few incidents, dispersed the demonstrators.

== Timeline ==
=== 1988 ===
==== Moscow loses control ====
In 1988, Gorbachev started to lose control of two regions of the Soviet Union, as the Baltic republics were now leaning towards independence, and the Caucasus descended into violence and civil war.

On 1 July 1988, the fourth and last day of a bruising 19th Party Conference, Gorbachev won the backing of the tired delegates for his last-minute proposal to create a new supreme legislative body called the Congress of People's Deputies. Frustrated by the old guard's resistance, Gorbachev embarked on a set of constitutional changes to attempt separation of party and state, thereby isolating his Party opponents. Detailed proposals for the new Congress of People's Deputies were published on 2 October 1988, and to enable the creation of the new legislature. The Supreme Soviet, during its 29 November – 1 December 1988, session, implemented amendments to the 1977 Soviet Constitution, enacted a law on electoral reform, and set the date of the election for 26 March 1989.

On 29 November 1988, the Soviet Union ceased jamming all foreign radio stations, allowing Soviet citizens – for the first time since a brief period in the 1960s – to have unrestricted access to news sources beyond Communist Party control.

==== Baltic republics ====
In 1986 and 1987, Latvia had been in the vanguard of the Baltic states in pressing for reform. In 1988, Estonia took over the lead role with the foundation of the Soviet Union's first popular front and starting to influence state policy.

The Popular Front of Estonia was founded in April 1988. On 16 June 1988, Gorbachev replaced Karl Vaino, the "old guard" leader of the Communist Party of Estonia, with the comparatively liberal Vaino Väljas. In late June 1988, Väljas bowed to pressure from the Estonian Popular Front and legalized the flying of the old blue-black-white flag of Estonia, and agreed to a new state language law that made Estonian the official language of the Republic.

On 2 October, the Popular Front formally launched its political platform at a two-day congress. Väljas attended, gambling that the Front could help Estonia become a model of economic and political revival, while moderating separatist and other radical tendencies. On 16 November 1988, the Supreme Soviet of the Estonian SSR adopted a declaration of national sovereignty under which Estonian laws would take precedence over those of the Soviet Union. Estonia's parliament also laid claim to the republic's natural resources including land, inland waters, forests, mineral deposits, and to the means of industrial production, agriculture, construction, state banks, transportation, and municipal services within the territory of Estonia's borders. At the same time the Estonian Citizens' Committees started registration of citizens of the Republic of Estonia to carry out the elections of the Congress of Estonia.

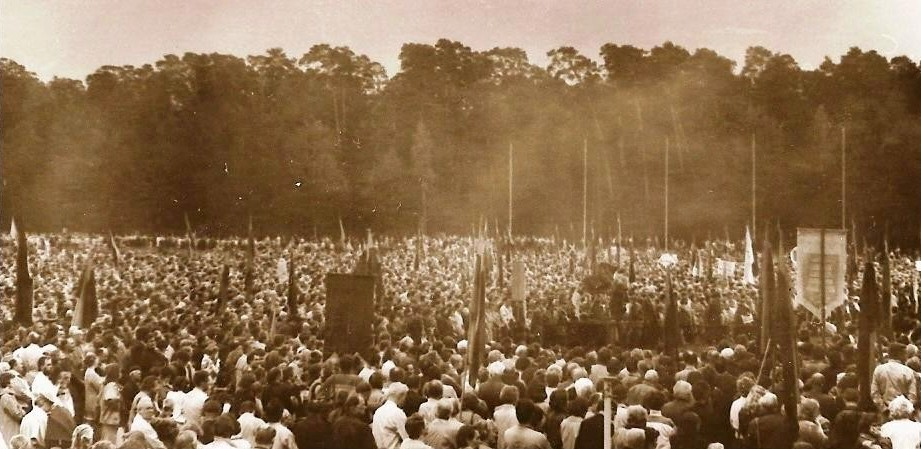
Anti-Soviet rally of about 250,000 in Lithuania, whose Sąjūdis movement helped restore independence (August 1988)

The Popular Front of Latvia was founded in June 1988. On 4 October, Gorbachev replaced Boris Pugo, the "old guard" leader of the Communist Party of Latvia, with the more liberal Jānis Vagris. In October 1988 Vagris bowed to pressure from the Latvian Popular Front and legalized flying the former carmine red-and-white flag of independent Latvia, and on 6 October he passed a law making Latvian the country's official language.

The Popular Front of Lithuania, called Sąjūdis ("Movement"), was founded in May 1988. On 19 October 1988, Gorbachev replaced Ringaudas Songaila, the "old guard" leader of the Communist Party of Lithuania – who had been in office for nearly a year – with the relatively liberal Algirdas Brazauskas. In October 1988, Brazauskas bowed to pressure from Sąjūdis members, and legalized the flying of the historic yellow-green-red flag of independent Lithuania, and in November 1988 he passed a law making Lithuanian the country's official language; also, the former national anthem, "Tautiška giesmė", was later reinstated. Following a violent protest action in the capital on 28 October, many of Songalia's remaining holdovers within the CPL either resigned or retired in protest of the police brutality of that day.

==== Rebellion in the Caucasus ====
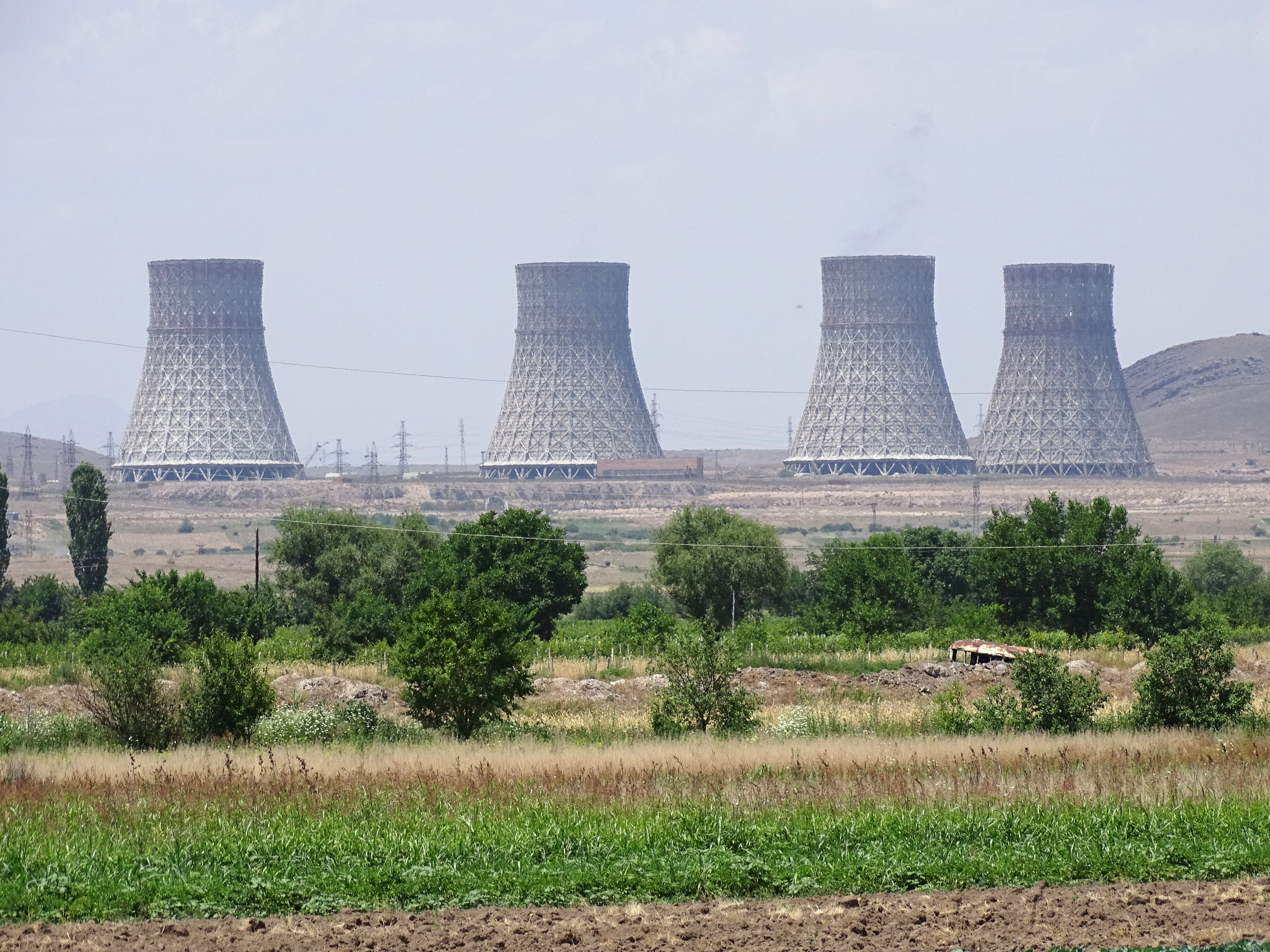
Environmental concerns over the Metsamor Nuclear Power Plant drove initial demonstrations in Yerevan.

On 20 February 1988, after a week of growing demonstrations in Stepanakert, capital of the Nagorno-Karabakh Autonomous Oblast (the ethnically Armenian-majority area within the Azerbaijan Soviet Socialist Republic), the Regional Soviet voted to secede and join with the Soviet Socialist Republic of Armenia. This local vote in a small, remote part of the Soviet Union made headlines around the world; it was an unprecedented defiance of republican and national authorities. On 22 February 1988, in what became known as the "Askeran clash", thousands of Azerbaijanis marched towards Nagorno-Karabakh, demanding information about rumors of an Azerbaijani having been killed in Stepanakert. They were informed by officials that no such incident had occurred; however, dissatisfied with what they were told, they began marching toward Nagorno-Karabakh, killing (or injuring?) 50. Karabakh authorities mobilised over a thousand police to stop the march, with the resulting clashes leaving two Azerbaijanis dead. These deaths, announced on state radio, led to the Sumgait pogrom. Between 26 February and 1 March, the city of Sumgait (Azerbaijan) saw violent anti-Armenian rioting during which at least 32 people were killed. The authorities totally lost control and occupied the city with paratroopers and tanks; nearly all of the 14,000 Armenian residents of Sumgait fled.

Gorbachev refused to make any changes to the status of Nagorno-Karabakh, which remained part of Azerbaijan. He instead sacked the Communist Party Leaders in both Republics in response – on 21 May 1988, Kamran Baghirov was replaced by Abdurrahman Vazirov as First Secretary of the Azerbaijan Communist Party. From 23 July to September 1988, a group of Azerbaijani intellectuals began working for a new organization called the Popular Front of Azerbaijan, loosely based on the Estonian Popular Front. On 17 September, when gun battles broke out between the Armenians and Azerbaijanis near Stepanakert, two soldiers were killed and more than two dozen injured. This led to almost tit-for-tat ethnic polarization in Nagorno-Karabakh's two main towns: the Azerbaijani minority was expelled from Stepanakert, and the Armenian minority was expelled from Shusha. On 17 November 1988, in response to the exodus of tens of thousands of Azerbaijanis from Armenia, a series of mass demonstrations began in Baku's Lenin Square, lasting 18 days and attracting half a million demonstrators in support of their compatriots in that region. On 5 December 1988, the Soviet police and civilian militiamen moved in, cleared the square by force, and imposed a curfew that lasted ten months.

The rebellion of fellow Armenians in Nagorno-Karabakh had an immediate effect in Armenia itself. Daily demonstrations, which began in the Armenian capital Yerevan on 18 February, initially attracted few people, but each day the Nagorno-Karabakh issue became increasingly prominent and the numbers swelled. On 20 February, a 30,000-strong crowd demonstrated in the Theater Square, by 22 February, there were 100,000, the next day 300,000, and a transport strike was declared, by 25 February, there were close to a million demonstrators – more than a quarter of Armenia's population. This was the first of the large, peaceful public demonstrations that would become a feature of communism's overthrow in Prague, Berlin, and, ultimately, Moscow. Leading Armenian intellectuals and nationalists, including the future first president of independent Armenia Levon Ter-Petrosyan, formed the eleven-member Karabakh Committee to lead and organize the new movement.

Also on 21 May, Gorbachev replaced Karen Demirchyan with Suren Harutyunyan as First Secretary of the Communist Party of Armenia. However, Harutyunyan quickly changed course and on 28 May, allowed Armenians to unfurl the red-blue-orange First Armenian Republic flag for the first time in almost 70 years to mark the 1918 declaration of the First Republic. On 15 June 1988, the Armenian Supreme Soviet adopted a resolution formally approving the idea of Nagorno-Karabakh's unification as part of the republic. Armenia, formerly one of the most loyal republics, had suddenly turned into the leading rebel republic. On 5 July 1988, when a contingent of troops was sent in to remove demonstrators by force from Yerevan's Zvartnots International Airport, shots were fired and one student protester was killed. In September, further large demonstrations in Yerevan led to the deployment of armored vehicles. In the autumn of 1988 almost all of the 200,000 Azerbaijani minority in Armenia was expelled by Armenian nationalists, with over 100 killed in the process. That, after the Sumgait pogrom earlier that year, which had been carried out by Azerbaijanis to ethnic Armenians and led to the expulsion of Armenians from Azerbaijan, was for many Armenians considered an act of revenge for the killings at Sumgait. On 25 November 1988, a military commandant took control of Yerevan as the Soviet government moved to prevent further ethnic violence.

On 7 December 1988, the Spitak earthquake struck, killing an estimated 25,000 to 50,000 people. When Gorbachev rushed back from a visit to the United States, he was so angered with being confronted by protesters calling for Nagorno-Karabakh to be made part of the Armenian Republic during a natural disaster that on 11 December 1988, he ordered that the entire Karabakh Committee be arrested.

In Tbilisi, the capital of Soviet Georgia, many demonstrators camped out in front of the republic's legislature in November 1988 calling for Georgia's independence and in support of Estonia's declaration of sovereignty.

==== Western republics ====
Beginning in February 1988, the Democratic Movement of Moldova, later the Popular Front of Moldova, organized public meetings, demonstrations, and song festivals, which gradually grew in size and intensity. In the streets, the center of public manifestations was the Stephen the Great Monument in Chișinău, and the adjacent park harboring Aleea Clasicilor (The "Alley of Classics [of Literature]"). The transition from "movement" (an informal association) to "front" (a formal association) was seen as a natural "upgrade" once a movement gained momentum with the public, and the Soviet authorities no longer dared to crack down on it.

On 26 April 1988, about 500 people participated in a march organized by the Ukrainian Cultural Club on Kiev's Khreshchatyk Street to mark the second anniversary of the Chernobyl nuclear disaster, carrying placards with slogans like "Openness and Democracy to the End". Between May and June 1988, Ukrainian Catholics in western Ukraine celebrated the Millennium of Christianity in Kievan Rus' in secret by holding services in the forests of Buniv, Kalush, Hoshi, and Zarvanytsia. On 5 June 1988, as the official celebrations of the Millennium were held in Moscow, the Ukrainian Cultural Club hosted its own observances in Kiev at the monument to Vladimir the Great, the grand prince of Kievan Rus'.

On 16 June 1988, 6,000 to 8,000 people gathered in Lviv to hear speakers declare no confidence in the local list of delegates to the 19th Communist Party conference, to begin on 29 June. On 21 June, a rally in Lviv attracted 50,000 people who had heard about a revised delegate list. Authorities attempted to disperse the rally in front of Druzhba Stadium. On 7 July, 10,000 to 20,000 people witnessed the launch of the Democratic Front to Promote Perestroika. On 17 July, a group of 10,000 gathered in the village Zarvanytsia for Millennium services celebrated by Ukrainian Greek-Catholic Bishop Pavlo Vasylyk. The militia tried to disperse attendees, but it turned out to be the largest gathering of Ukrainian Catholics since Stalin outlawed the Church in 1946. On 4 August, which came to be known as "Bloody Thursday", local authorities violently suppressed a demonstration organized by the Democratic Front to Promote Perestroika. Forty-one people were detained, fined, or sentenced to 15 days of administrative arrest. On 1 September, local authorities violently displaced 5,000 students at a public meeting lacking official permission at Ivan Franko State University.

On 13 November 1988, approximately 10,000 people attended an officially sanctioned meeting organized by the cultural heritage organization Spadschyna, the Kiev University student club Hromada, and the environmental groups Zelenyi Svit ("Green World") and Noosfera, to focus on ecological issues. From 14 to 18 November, 15 Ukrainian activists were among the 100 human-, national- and religious-rights advocates invited to discuss human rights with Soviet officials and a visiting delegation of the U.S. Commission on Security and Cooperation in Europe (also known as the Helsinki Commission). On 10 December, hundreds gathered in Kiev to observe International Human Rights Day at a rally organized by the Democratic Union. The unauthorized gathering resulted in the detention of local activists.

The Belarusian Popular Front was established in 1988 as a political party and cultural movement for democracy and independence, similar to the Baltic republics' popular fronts. The discovery of mass graves in Kurapaty outside Minsk by historian Zianon Pazniak, the Belarusian Popular Front's first leader, gave additional momentum to the pro-democracy and pro-independence movement in Belarus. It claimed that the NKVD performed secret killings in Kurapaty. Initially the Front had significant visibility because its numerous public actions almost always ended in clashes with the police and the KGB.

=== 1989 ===
==== Moscow: limited democratization ====
Spring 1989 saw the people of the Soviet Union exercising a democratic choice, albeit limited, for the first time since 1917, when they elected the new Congress of People's Deputies. Just as important was the uncensored live TV coverage of the legislature's deliberations, where people witnessed the previously feared Communist leadership being questioned and held accountable. This example fueled a limited experiment with democracy in Poland, which quickly led to the toppling of the Communist government in Warsaw that summer and in turn sparked uprisings that overthrew governments in the other five Warsaw Pact countries before the end of 1989, the year the Berlin Wall fell.

This was also the year that CNN became the first non-Soviet broadcaster allowed to beam its TV news programs to Moscow. Officially, CNN was available only to foreign guests in the Savoy Hotel, but Muscovites quickly learned how to pick up signals on their home televisions. That had a major effect on how Soviets saw events in their country and made censorship almost impossible.

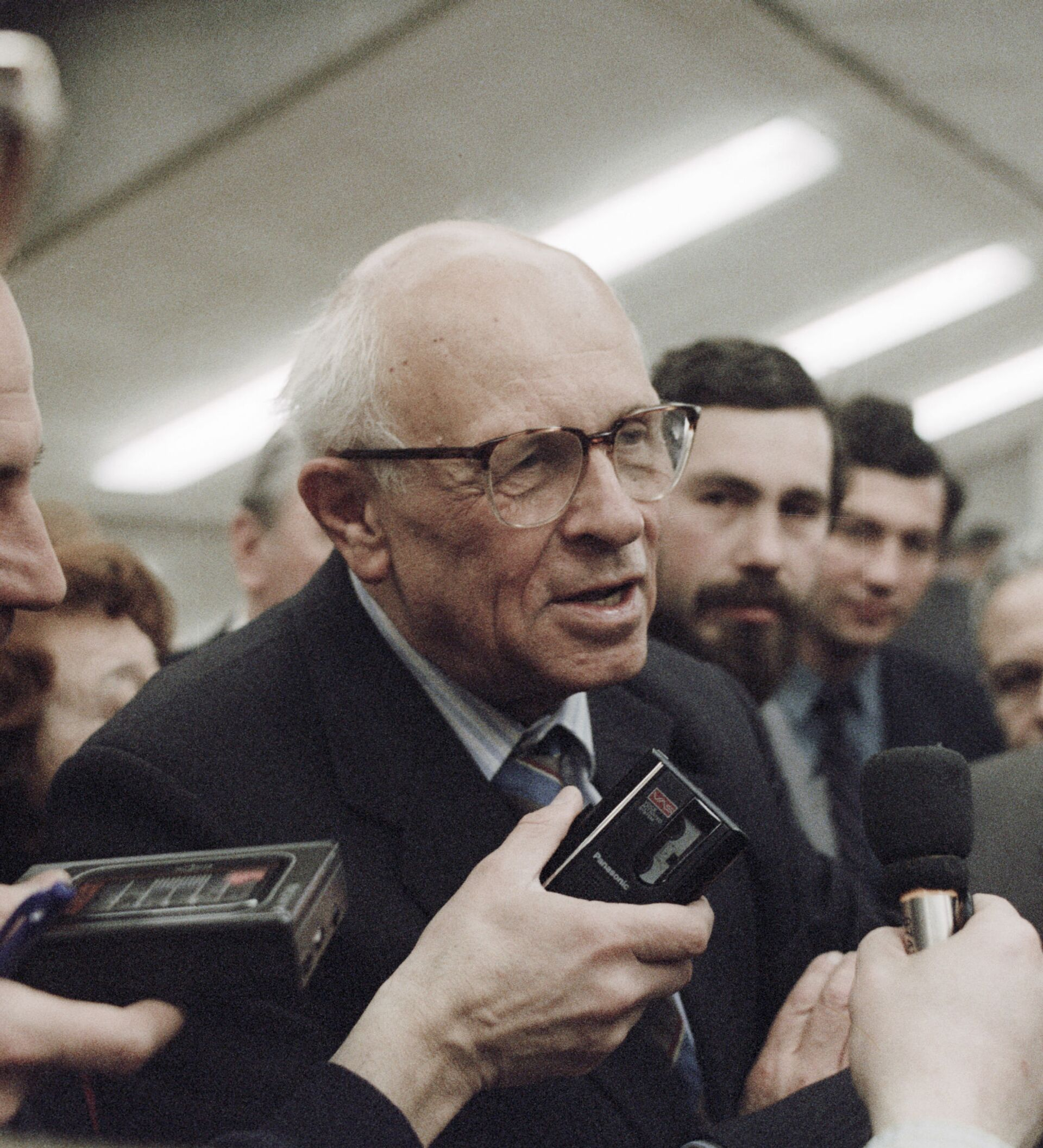
Andrei Sakharov, formerly exiled to Gorky, was elected to the Congress of People's Deputies in March 1989.

The month-long nomination period for candidates for the Congress of People's Deputies of the Soviet Union lasted until 24 January 1989. For the next month, selection among the 7,531 district nominees took place at meetings organized by constituency-level electoral commissions. On 7 March, a final list of 5,074 candidates was published; about 85% were Party members.

In the two weeks prior to the 1,500 district polls, elections to fill 750 reserved seats of public organizations, contested by 880 candidates, were held. Of these seats, 100 were allocated to the CPSU, 100 to the All-Union Central Council of Trade Unions, 75 to the Communist Youth Union (Komsomol), 75 to the Committee of Soviet Women, 75 to the War and Labour Veterans' Organization, and 325 to other organizations such as the Academy of Sciences. The selection process was done in April.

In the 26 March general elections, voter participation was an impressive 89.8%, and 1,958 (including 1,225 district seats) of the 2,250 CPD seats were filled. In district races, run-off elections were held in 76 constituencies on 2 and 9 April and fresh elections were organized on 14 and 20 April to 23 May, in the 199 remaining constituencies where the required absolute majority was not attained. While most CPSU-endorsed candidates were elected, more than 300 lost to independent candidates such as Yeltsin, the physicist Andrei Sakharov and the lawyer Anatoly Sobchak.

In the first session of the new Congress of People's Deputies (from 25 May to 9 June), hardliners retained control but reformers used the legislature as a platform for debate and criticism, which was broadcast live and uncensored. This transfixed the population since nothing like such a freewheeling debate had ever been witnessed in the Soviet Union. On 29 May, Yeltsin managed to secure a seat on the Supreme Soviet, and in the summer he formed the first opposition, the Inter-regional Deputies Group, composed of Russian nationalists and liberals. Composing the final legislative group in the Soviet Union, those elected in 1989 played a vital part in reforms and the eventual breakup of the Soviet Union during the next two years.

On 30 May 1989, Gorbachev proposed that local elections across the country, scheduled for November 1989, be postponed until early 1990 because there were still no laws governing the conduct of such elections. This was seen by some as a concession to local Party officials, who feared they would be swept from power in a wave of anti-establishment sentiment.

On 25 October 1989, the Supreme Soviet voted to eliminate special seats for the Communist Party and other official organizations in union-level and republic-level elections, responding to sharp popular criticism that such reserved slots were undemocratic. After vigorous debate, the 542-member Supreme Soviet passed the measure 254–85 (with 36 abstentions). The decision required a constitutional amendment, ratified by the full congress, which met 12–25 December. It also passed measures that would allow direct elections for presidents of each of the 15 constituent republics. Gorbachev strongly opposed such a move during debate but was defeated.

The vote expanded the power of republics in local elections, enabling them to decide for themselves how to organize voting. Latvia, Lithuania, and Estonia had already proposed laws for direct presidential elections. Local elections in all the republics had already been scheduled to take place between December and March 1990.

Map of the Eastern Bloc

The six Warsaw Pact countries of Eastern Europe, while nominally independent, were widely recognized as the Soviet satellite states (along with Mongolia). All had been occupied by the Soviet Red Army in 1945, had Soviet-style socialist states imposed upon them, and had very restricted freedom of action in either domestic or international affairs. Any moves towards real independence were suppressed by military force – in the Hungarian Revolution of 1956 and the Prague Spring in 1968. Gorbachev abandoned the oppressive and expensive Brezhnev Doctrine, which mandated intervention in the Warsaw Pact states, in favor of non-intervention in the internal affairs of allies – jokingly termed the Sinatra Doctrine in a reference to the Frank Sinatra song "My Way". Poland was the first republic to democratize following the enactment of the April Novelization, as agreed upon following the Polish Round Table Agreement talks from February to April between the government and the Solidarity trade union. The Polish Solidarity Union, as established through the 1980 August Accords, presented Lech Wałęsa as their candidate, who became the first democratically elected president of Poland. The elections in Poland inspired other countries in the Eastern Bloc to pursue peaceful democratic transitions, and soon the Warsaw Pact began to dissolve itself. The last of the countries to overthrow Communist leadership, Romania, only did so following the violent Romanian revolution.

==== Baltic Chain of Freedom ====
The Baltic Way or Baltic Chain (also Chain of Freedom; Estonian: Balti kett, Latvian: Baltijas ceļš, Lithuanian: Baltijos kelias, Russian: Балтийский путь) was a peaceful political demonstration on 23 August 1989. An estimated 2 million people joined hands to form a human chain extending 600 kilometres (370 mi) across Estonia, Latvia and Lithuania, which had been forcibly reincorporated into the Soviet Union in 1944. The colossal demonstration marked the 50th anniversary of the Molotov–Ribbentrop Pact that divided Eastern Europe into spheres of influence and led to the occupation of the Baltic states in 1940.

Just months after the Baltic Way protests, in December 1989, the Congress of People's Deputies accepted – and Gorbachev signed – the report by the Yakovlev Commission condemning the secret protocols of the Molotov–Ribbentrop pact which led to the annexations of the three Baltic republics.

In the March 1989 elections to the Congress of People's Deputies, 36 of the 42 deputies from Lithuania were candidates from the independent national movement Sąjūdis. That was the greatest victory for any national organization within the Soviet Union and was a devastating revelation to the Lithuanian Communist Party of its growing unpopularity.

On 7 December 1989, the Communist Party of Lithuania, under the leadership of Algirdas Brazauskas, split from the Communist Party of the Soviet Union and abandoned its claim to have a constitutional "leading role" in politics. A smaller loyalist faction of the Communist Party, headed by hardliner Mykolas Burokevičius, was established and remained affiliated with the party. However, Lithuania's governing Communist Party was formally independent from Moscow's control, a first for a Soviet republics and a political earthquake that prompted Gorbachev to arrange a visit to Lithuania the following month in a futile attempt to bring the local party back under control. The following year, the Communist Party lost power altogether in multiparty parliamentary elections, which had caused Vytautas Landsbergis to become the first noncommunist leader (Chairman of the Supreme Council of Lithuania) of Lithuania since its forced incorporation into the Soviet Union.

==== Caucasus ====
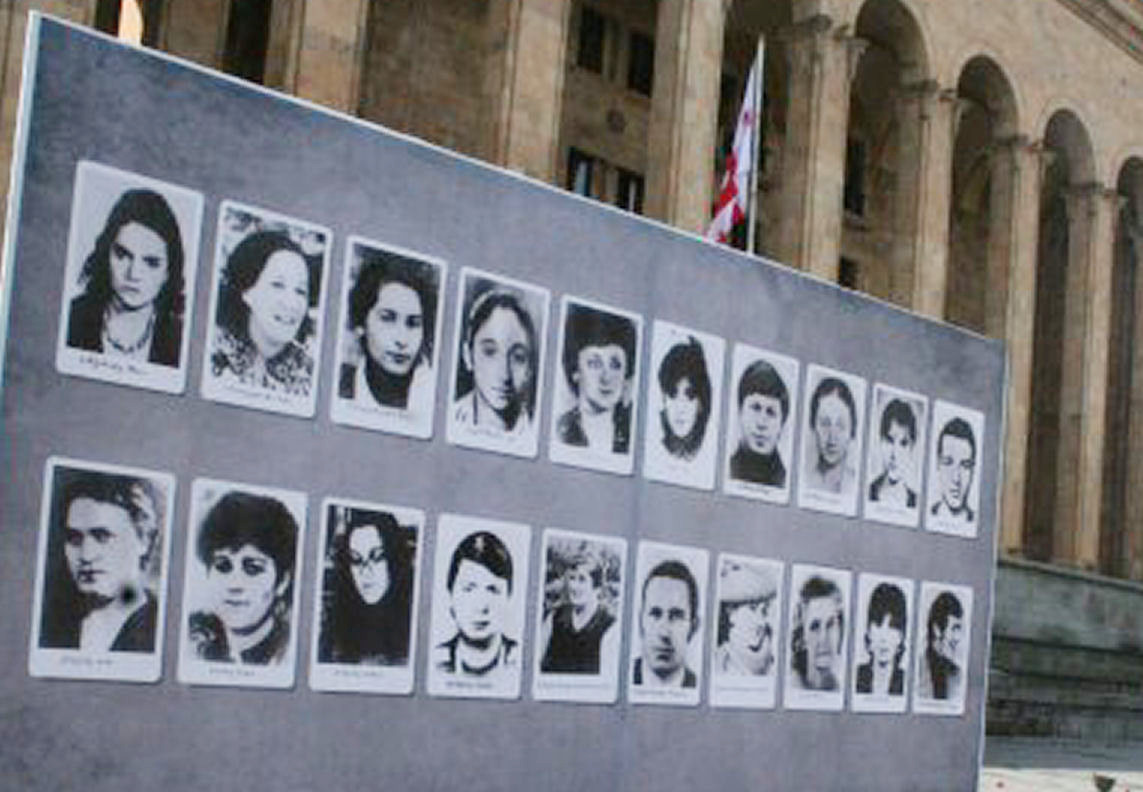
Photos of victims of the April 9 tragedy in Tbilisi, Georgia

On 16 July 1989, the Popular Front of Azerbaijan held its first congress and elected Abulfaz Elchibey, who would become president, as its chairman. On 19 August 600,000 protesters jammed Baku's Lenin Square (now Azadliq Square) to demand the release of political prisoners. In the second half of 1989, weapons were handed out in Nagorno-Karabakh. When Karabakhis got hold of small arms to replace hunting rifles and crossbows, casualties began to mount; bridges were blown up, roads were blockaded, and hostages were taken.

In a new and effective tactic, the Popular Front launched a rail blockade of Armenia, which caused petrol and food shortages because 85 percent of Armenia's freight came from Azerbaijan. Under pressure from the Popular Front the Communist authorities in Azerbaijan started making concessions. On 25 September, they passed a sovereignty law that gave precedence to Azerbaijani law, and on 4 October, the Popular Front was permitted to register as a legal organization as long as it lifted the blockade. Transport communications between Azerbaijan and Armenia never fully recovered. Tensions continued to escalate and on 29 December, Popular Front activists seized local party offices in Jalilabad, wounding dozens.

On 31 May 1989, the 11 members of the Karabakh Committee, who had been imprisoned without trial in Moscow's Matrosskaya Tishina prison, were released and returned home to a hero's welcome. Soon after his release, Levon Ter-Petrosyan, an academic, was elected chairman of the anti-communist opposition Pan-Armenian National Movement, and later stated that it was in 1989 that he first began considering full independence as his goal.

On 7 April 1989, Soviet troops and armored personnel carriers were sent to Tbilisi after more than 100,000 people protested in front of Communist Party headquarters with banners calling for Georgia to secede from the Soviet Union and for Abkhazia to be fully integrated into Georgia. On 9 April 1989, troops attacked the demonstrators; some 20 people were killed and more than 200 wounded. This event radicalized Georgian politics, prompting many to conclude that independence was preferable to continued Soviet rule. Given the abuses by members of the armed forces and police, Moscow acted fast. On 14 April, Gorbachev removed Jumber Patiashvili as First Secretary of the Georgian Communist Party as a result of the killings and replaced him with former Georgian KGB chief Givi Gumbaridze.

On 16 July 1989, in Abkhazia's capital Sukhumi, a protest against the opening of a Georgian university branch in the town led to violence that quickly degenerated into a large-scale inter-ethnic confrontation in which 18 died and hundreds were injured before Soviet troops restored order. This riot marked the start of the Georgian-Abkhaz conflict.

On 17 November 1989, the Supreme Council of Georgia held its fall plenary session, which lasted two days. One of the resolutions that came out of it was as a declaration against what it called an "illegal" accession into the Soviet Union of the country 68 years ago, forced against its will by the Red Army, the CPSU and the All-Russian Council of People's Commissars.

==== Western republics ====
On 26 March 1989, elections to the Congress of People's Deputies, 15 of the 46 Moldovan deputies elected for congressional seats in Moscow were supporters of the Nationalist/Democratic movement. The Popular Front of Moldova founding congress took place two months later, on 20 May. During its second congress (30 June – 1 July 1989), Ion Hadârcă was elected its president.

A series of demonstrations that became known as the Grand National Assembly (Romanian: Marea Adunare Națională) was the Front's first major achievement. Such mass demonstrations, including one attended by 300,000 people on 27 August, convinced the Moldovan Supreme Soviet on 31 August to adopt the language law making Romanian the official language, and replacing the Cyrillic alphabet with Latin characters.

In Ukraine, Lviv and Kiev celebrated Ukrainian Independence Day on 22 January 1989. Thousands gathered in Lviv for an unauthorized moleben (religious service) in front of St. George's Cathedral. In Kiev, 60 activists met in a Kiev apartment to commemorate the proclamation of the Ukrainian People's Republic in 1918. On 11–12 February 1989, the Ukrainian Language Society held its founding congress. On 15 February 1989, the formation of the Initiative Committee for the Renewal of the Ukrainian Autocephalous Orthodox Church was announced. The program and statutes of the movement were proposed by the Writers' Union of Ukraine and were published in the journal Literaturna Ukraina on 16 February 1989. The organization heralded Ukrainian dissidents such as Vyacheslav Chornovil.

In late February, large public rallies took place in Kiev to protest the election laws, on the eve of the 26 March elections to the USSR Congress of People's Deputies, and to call for the resignation of the first secretary of the Communist Party of Ukraine, Volodymyr Shcherbytsky, lampooned as "the mastodon of stagnation". The demonstrations coincided with a visit to Ukraine by Soviet general secretary Mikhail Gorbachev. On 26 February 1989, between 20,000 and 30,000 people participated in an unsanctioned ecumenical memorial service in Lviv, marking the anniversary of the death of 19th-century Ukrainian artist and nationalist Taras Shevchenko.

On 4 March 1989, the Memorial Society, committed to honoring the victims of Stalinism and cleansing society of Soviet practices, was founded in Kiev. A public rally was held the next day. On 12 March, a pre-election meeting organized in Lviv by the Ukrainian Helsinki Union and the Marian Society Myloserdia (Compassion) was violently dispersed, and nearly 300 people were detained. On 26 March, elections were held to the Congress of People's Deputies of the Soviet Union; by-elections were held on 9 April, 14 May, and 21 May. Among the 225 Ukrainian representatives to the Congress, most were conservatives, though a handful of progressives were also elected.

From 20 to 23 April 1989, pre-election meetings were held in Lviv for four consecutive days, drawing crowds of up to 25,000. The action included a one-hour warning strike at eight local factories and institutions. It was the first labor strike in Lviv since 1944. On 3 May, a pre-election rally attracted 30,000 in Lviv. On 7 May, The Memorial Society organized a mass meeting at Bykivnia, site of a mass grave of Ukrainian and Polish victims of Stalinist terror. After a march from Kiev to the site, a memorial service was staged.

From mid-May to September 1989, Ukrainian Greek-Catholic hunger strikers staged protests on Moscow's Arbat to call attention to the plight of their Church. They were especially active during the July session of the World Council of Churches held in Moscow. The protest ended with the arrests of the group on 18 September. On 27 May 1989, the founding conference of the Lviv regional Memorial Society was held. On 18 June 1989, an estimated 100,000 faithful participated in public religious services in Ivano-Frankivsk in western Ukraine, responding to Cardinal Myroslav Lubachivsky's call for an international day of prayer.

On 19 August 1989, the Russian Orthodox Parish of Saints Peter and Paul announced it would be switching to the Ukrainian Autocephalous Orthodox Church. On 2 September 1989, tens of thousands across Ukraine protested a draft election law that reserved special seats for the Communist Party and for other official organizations for parliamentary seats: 50,000 in Lviv, 40,000 in Kiev, 10,000 in Zhytomyr, 5,000 each in Dniprodzerzhynsk and Chervonohrad, and 2,000 in Kharkiv. From 8–10 September 1989, writer Ivan Drach was elected to head Rukh, the People's Movement of Ukraine, at its founding congress in Kiev. On 17 September, between 150,000 and 200,000 people marched in Lviv, demanding the legalization of the Ukrainian Greek Catholic Church. On 21 September 1989, exhumation of a mass grave began in Demianiv Laz, a nature preserve south of Ivano-Frankivsk. On 28 September, the First Secretary of the Communist Party of Ukraine Volodymyr Shcherbytsky, a holdover from the Brezhnev era, was replaced in this office by Vladimir Ivashko.

On 1 October 1989, a peaceful demonstration of 10,000 to 15,000 people was violently dispersed by police constables in front of Lviv's Druzhba Stadium, where a concert celebrating the Soviet "reunification" of Ukrainian lands was being held. On 10 October, Ivano-Frankivsk was the site of a pre-election protest attended by 30,000 people. On 15 October, several thousand people gathered in Chervonohrad, Chernivtsi, Rivne, and Zhytomyr; 500 in Dnipropetrovsk; and 30,000 in Lviv to protest the election law. On 20 October, faithful and clergy of the Ukrainian Autocephalous Orthodox Church participated in a synod in Lviv, the first since its forced liquidation in the 1930s.

On 24 October, the union Supreme Soviet passed a law eliminating special seats for Communist Party and other official organizations' representatives in parliament. On 26 October, twenty factories in Lviv held strikes and meetings to protest the police brutality of 1 October and the authorities' unwillingness to prosecute those responsible. From 26 to 28 October, the Zelenyi Svit (Friends of the Earth – Ukraine) environmental association held its founding congress, and on 27 October the Ukrainian Parliament passed a law eliminating the special status of party and other official organizations as deputies of parliament.

On 28 October 1989, the Ukrainian Parliament decreed that effective 1 January 1990, Ukrainian would be the official language of Ukraine, while Russian would be used for communication between ethnic groups. On the same day, The Congregation of the Church of the Transfiguration in Lviv left the Russian Orthodox Church and proclaimed itself the Ukrainian Greek Catholic Church. The following day, thousands attended a memorial service at Demianiv Laz, and a temporary marker was placed to indicate that a monument to the "victims of the repressions of 1939–1941" soon would be erected.

In mid-November, The Shevchenko Ukrainian Language Society was officially registered. On 19 November 1989, a public gathering in Kiev attracted thousands of mourners, friends, and family to the reburial in Ukraine of three inmates of the infamous Gulag Camp No. 36 in Perm in the Ural Mountains: human-rights activists Vasyl Stus, Oleksiy Tykhy, and Yuriy Lytvyn. Their remains were reinterred in Baikove Cemetery. On 26 November 1989, a day of prayer and fasting was proclaimed by Cardinal Myroslav Lubachivsky, thousands of faithful in western Ukraine participated in religious services on the eve of a meeting between Pope John Paul II and General Secretary of the Central Committee of the CPSU Gorbachev. On 28 November 1989, the Ukrainian SSR's Council for Religious Affairs issued a decree allowing Ukrainian Catholic congregations to register as legal organizations. The decree was proclaimed on December 1, coinciding with a meeting at the Vatican between the pope and the Soviet general secretary.

On 10 December 1989, the first officially sanctioned observance of International Human Rights Day was held in Lviv. On 17 December, an estimated 30,000 attended a public meeting organized in Kiev by Rukh in memory of Nobel laureate Andrei Sakharov, who died on 14 December. On 26 December, the Supreme Soviet of Ukrainian SSR adopted a law designating Christmas, Easter, and the Feast of the Holy Trinity official holidays.

In May 1989, a Soviet dissident, Mustafa Dzhemilev, was elected to lead the newly founded Crimean Tatar National Movement. He also led the campaign for the return of Crimean Tatars to their homeland in Crimea after 45 years of exile.

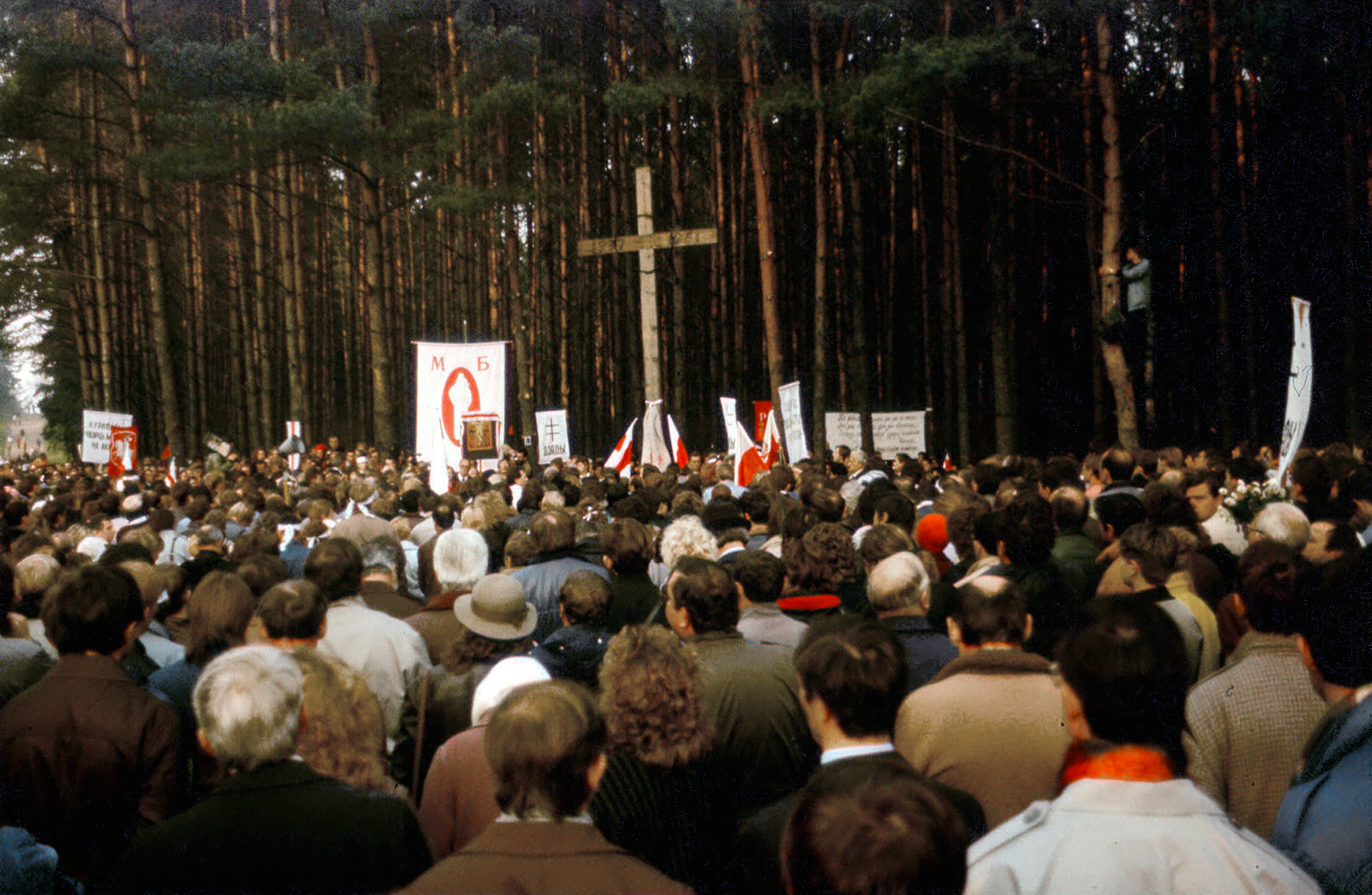
Meeting in Kurapaty, Belarus, 1989

On 24 January 1989, the Soviet authorities in Byelorussia agreed to the demand of the democratic opposition (the Belarusian Popular Front) to build a monument to thousands of people shot by Stalin-era police in the Kuropaty Forest near Minsk in the 1930s.

On 30 September 1989, thousands of Belarusians, denouncing local leaders, marched through Minsk to demand additional cleanup of the 1986 Chernobyl disaster site in Ukraine. Up to 15,000 protesters wearing armbands bearing radioactivity symbols and carrying the banned red-and-white national flag used by the government-in-exile filed through torrential rain in defiance of a ban by local authorities. Later, they gathered in the city center near the government's headquarters, where speakers demanded the resignation of Yefrem Sokolov, the republic's Communist Party leader, and called for the evacuation of half a million people from the contaminated zones.

==== Miners' strikes ====
Strike actions by coal miners in the Kuznetsk Basin, or Kuzbass, began on 10 or 11 July 1989, in reaction to increased prices, unsafe working conditions and popular frenzy against corruption as a result of perestroika. Miners in the Kuzbass were soon joined by other miners in Ukraine's eastern Donbas region and the northern city of Vorkuta. Shcherbytsky, Ukraine's first secretary, came under significant political pressure as the strikes in the Donbas became particularly militant and connected themselves to Ukrainian dissident groups. The strikes came to an end from 24 to 27 July after the Soviet government agreed to codify the workers' demands into law, but by that point the damage had already been done. Following a 7 August meeting of the Communist Party of Ukraine, Shcherbytsky was forced to retire.

The government's accession to the miners' demands failed to prevent the growth of public anger, particularly in Ukraine, where the miners had become especially militant. The Independent Union of Miners, the Soviet Union's first independent trade union, would go on to be founded in July 1990 as the Ukrainian dissident movement continued to gain broader public support.

==== Central Asian republics ====
Thousands of Soviet troops were sent to the Fergana Valley, southeast of the Uzbek capital Tashkent, to re-establish order after clashes in which local Uzbeks hunted down members of the Meskhetian minority in several days of rioting between 4–11 June 1989 in what would be called the Fergana massacre; about 100 people were killed. As a consequence, most of the Meskhetian community fled away from Uzbekistan. Uzbek outrage over the events soon reached the capital and soon Moscow acted fast. On 23 June 1989, Gorbachev removed Rafiq Nishonov as First Secretary of the Communist Party of the Uzbek SSR for being unable to stop the race riots in the region and replaced him with Islam Karimov, who went on to lead Uzbekistan as a Soviet Republic and subsequently as an independent state until his death in 2016.

In Kazakhstan on 19 June 1989, young men carrying guns, firebombs, iron bars, and stones rioted in Zhanaozen, causing a number of deaths. The youths tried to seize a police station and a water-supply station. They brought public transportation to a halt and shut down various shops and industries. By 25 June, the rioting had spread to five other towns near the Caspian Sea. A mob of about 150 people armed with sticks, stones and metal rods attacked the police station in Mangishlak, about 140 kilometres (90 miles) from Zhanaozen before they were dispersed by government troops flown in by helicopters. Mobs of young people also rampaged through Yeraliev, Shepke, Fort-Shevchenko and Kulsary, where they poured flammable liquid on trains housing temporary workers and set them on fire.

With the government and CPSU shocked by the riots, on 22 June 1989, as a result of the riots, Gorbachev removed Gennady Kolbin (the ethnic Russian whose appointment caused riots in December 1986) as First Secretary of the Communist Party of Kazakhstan for his poor handling of the June events and replaced him with Nursultan Nazarbayev, an ethnic Kazakh who went on to lead Kazakhstan as the Soviet Republic and subsequently to independence. Nazarbayev would lead Kazakhstan for 27 years until he stepped down as president on 19 March 2019.

=== 1990 ===
==== Moscow loses five republics ====
On 7 February 1990, the Central Committee of the CPSU accepted Gorbachev's recommendation that the party give up its monopoly on political power. In 1990, all fifteen constituent republics of the USSR held their first competitive elections, with reformers and ethnic nationalists winning many seats. The CPSU lost the elections in five republics:

- In Lithuania, to Sąjūdis, on 24 February (run-off elections on 4, 7, 8 and 10 March)
- In Moldova, to the Popular Front of Moldova, on 25 February
- In Estonia, to the Popular Front of Estonia, on 18 March
- In Latvia, to the Popular Front of Latvia, on 18 March (run-off elections on 25 March, 1 and 29 April)
- In Georgia, to Round Table—Free Georgia, on 28 October (run-off election on 11 November)

The constituent republics began to declare their fledgling states' sovereignty and began a "war of laws" with the Moscow central government; they rejected union-wide legislation that conflicted with local laws, asserted control over their local economies, and refused to pay taxes to the Soviet government. Landsbergis, Chairman of the Supreme Council of Lithuania, also exempted Lithuanian men from mandatory service in the Soviet Armed Forces. This conflict caused economic dislocation as supply lines were disrupted, and caused the Soviet economy to decline further.

==== Rivalry between Soviet Union and Russian Soviet Federative Socialist Republic ====
On 4 March 1990, the Russian Soviet Federative Socialist Republic held relatively free elections for the Congress of People's Deputies of Russia. Boris Yeltsin was elected, representing Sverdlovsk, garnering 72 percent of the vote. On 29 May 1990, Yeltsin was elected chair of the Supreme Soviet of the RSFSR, despite the fact that Gorbachev asked Russian deputies not to vote for him.

Yeltsin was supported by democratic and conservative members of the Supreme Soviet, who sought power in the developing political situation. A new power struggle emerged between the RSFSR and the Soviet Union. On 12 June 1990, the Congress of People's Deputies of the RSFSR adopted a declaration of sovereignty. On 12 July 1990, Yeltsin resigned from the Communist Party in a dramatic speech at the 28th Congress.

==== Baltic republics ====
Baltic leaders

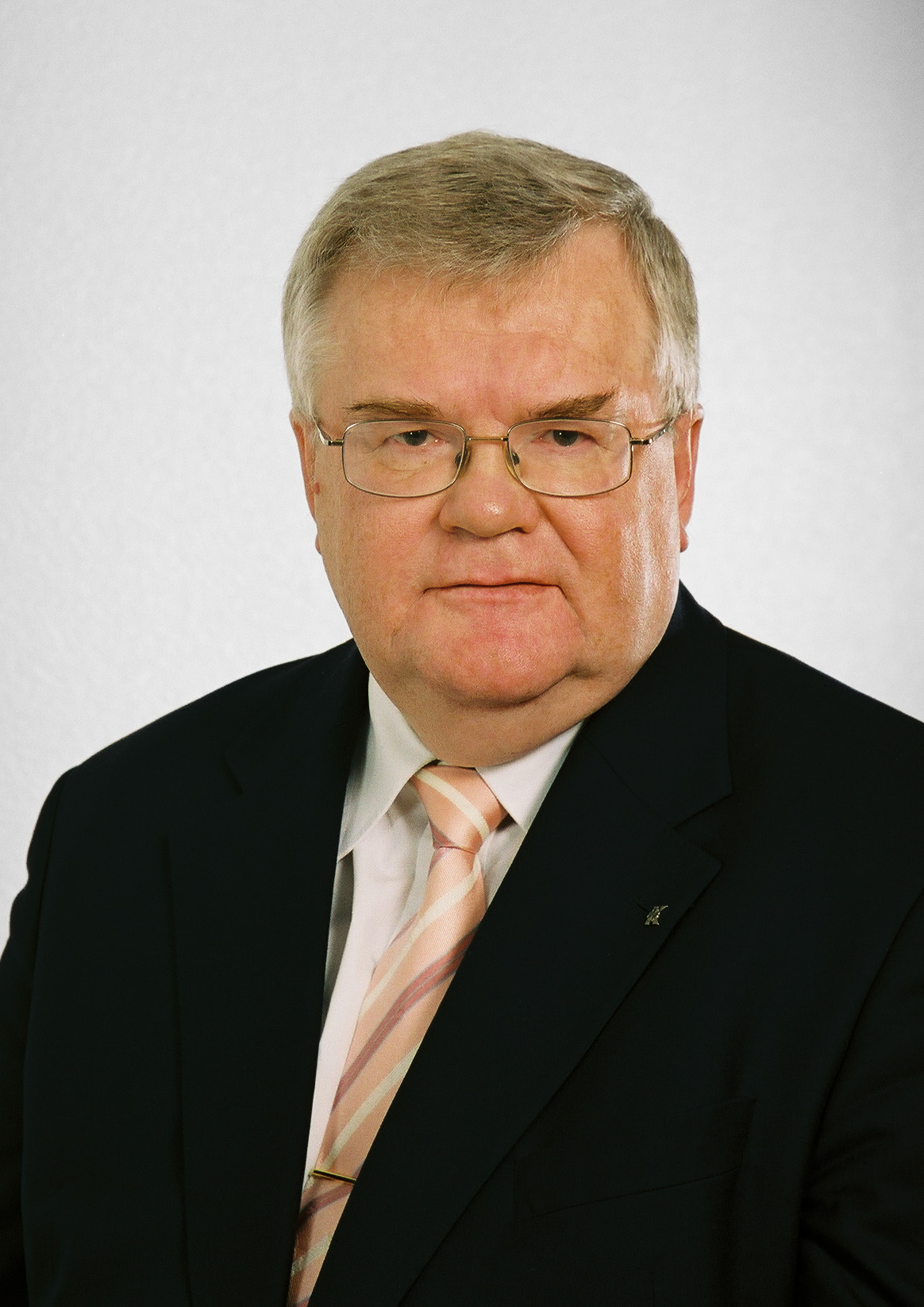
Edgar Savisaar of Estonia

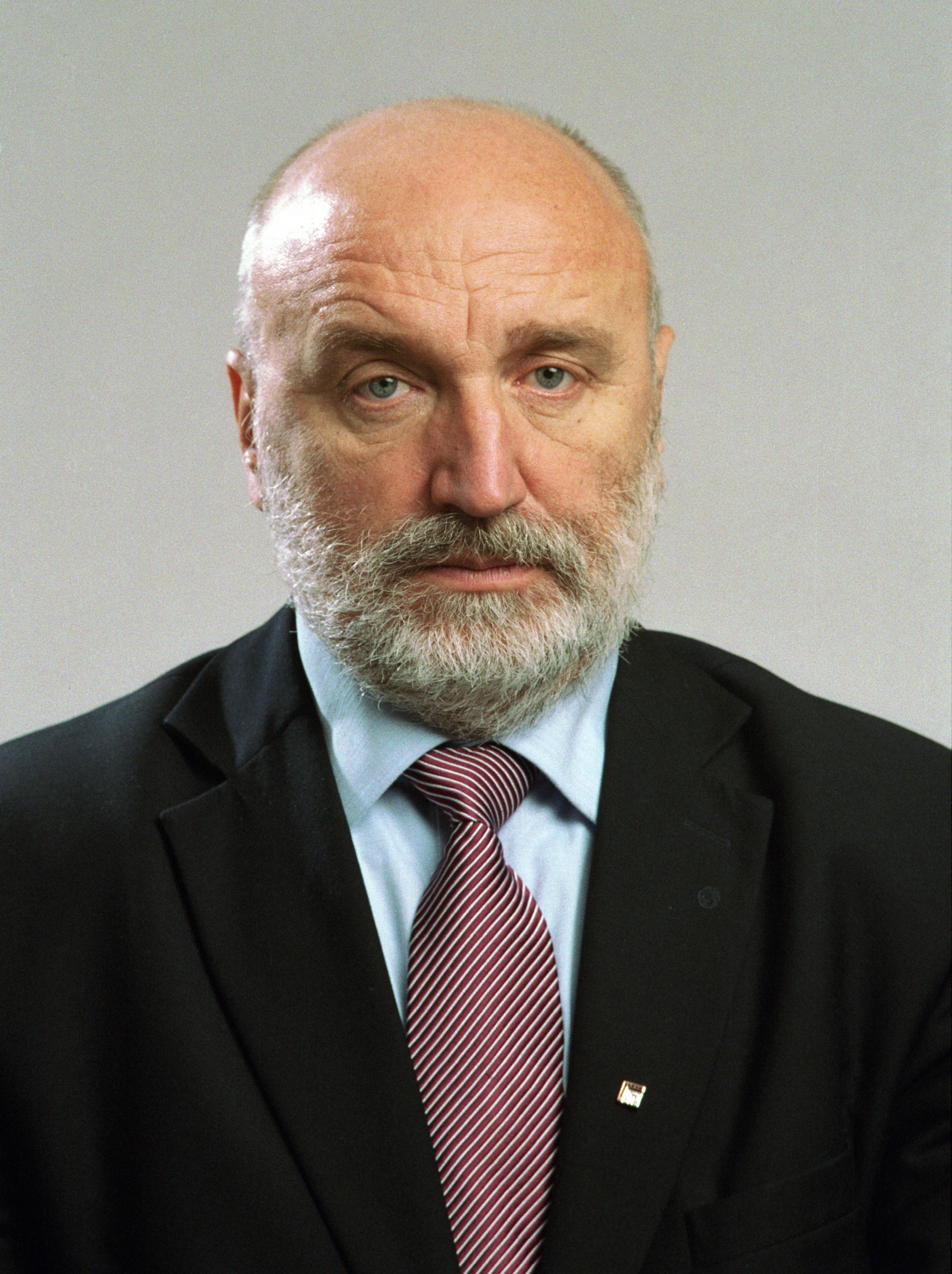
Ivars Godmanis of Latvia

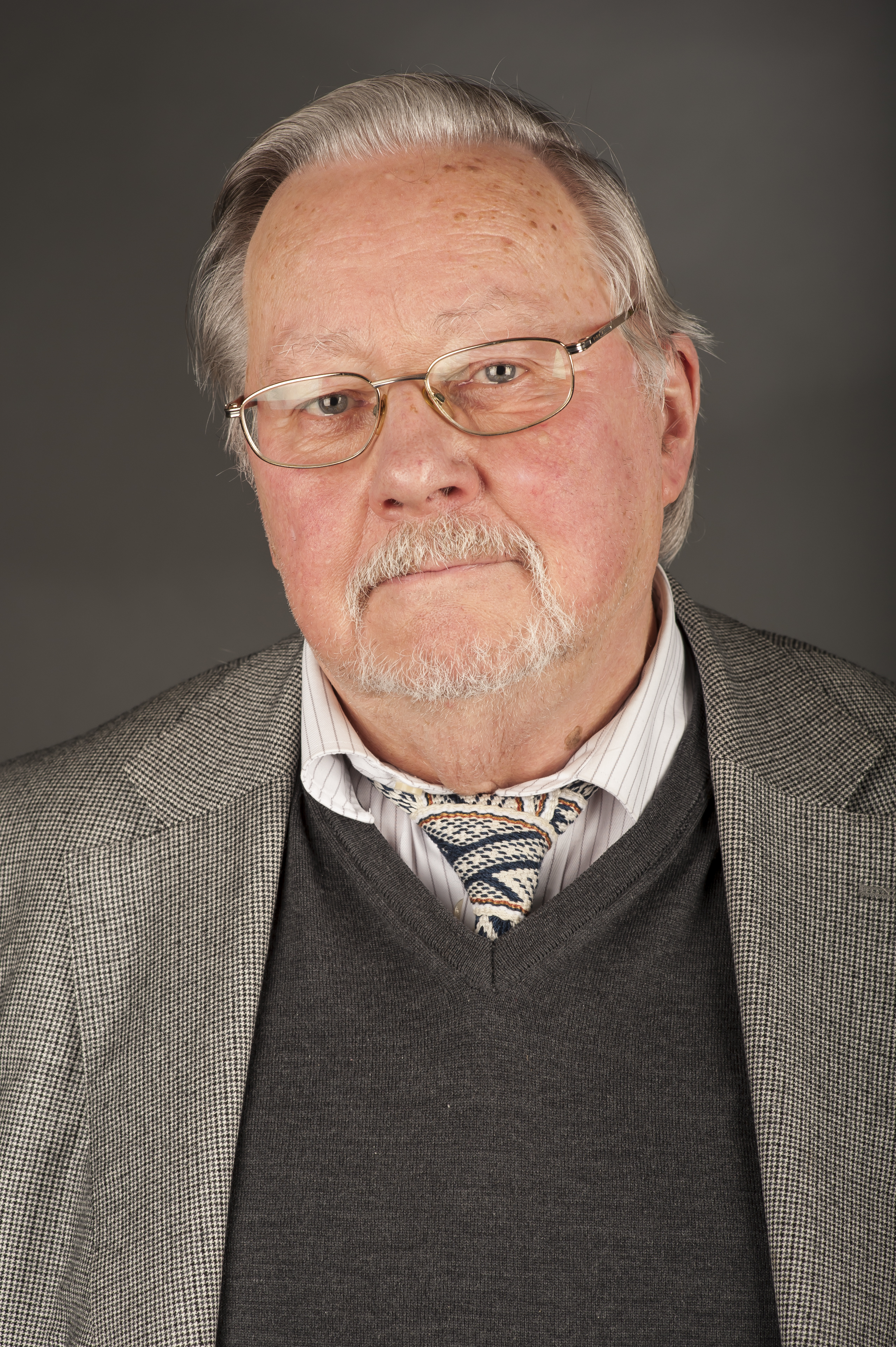
Vytautas Landsbergis of Lithuania

Gorbachev's visit to the Lithuanian capital Vilnius on 11–13 January 1990, provoked a pro-independence rally attended by an estimated 250,000 people.

On 11 March, the newly elected parliament of the Lithuanian SSR elected Vytautas Landsbergis, the leader of Sąjūdis, as its chairman and proclaimed the Act of the Re-Establishment of the State of Lithuania, making Lithuania the first Soviet Republic to declare independence from the Soviet Union. Moscow reacted with an economic blockade keeping the troops in Lithuania ostensibly "to secure the rights of ethnic Russians".

On 25 March 1990, the Estonian Communist Party voted to split from the CPSU after a six-month transition.

On 30 March 1990, the Estonian Supreme Council declared the Soviet occupation of Estonia since the Second World War to be illegal and began a period of national transition towards the formal reestablishment of national independence within the republic.

On 3 April 1990, Edgar Savisaar of the Popular Front of Estonia was elected chairman of the Council of Ministers (the equivalent of being Prime Minister), and soon a majority-pro independence cabinet was formed.

Latvia declared the restoration of independence on 4 May 1990, with the declaration stipulating a transitional period to complete independence. The Declaration stated that although Latvia had de facto lost its independence in World War II, the country had de jure remained a sovereign country because the annexation had been unconstitutional and against the will of the Latvian people. The declaration also stated that Latvia would base its relationship with the Soviet Union on the basis of the Latvian–Soviet Peace Treaty of 1920, in which the Soviet Union recognized Latvia's independence as inviolable "for all future time". 4 May is now a national holiday in Latvia.

On 7 May 1990, Ivars Godmanis of the Latvian Popular Front was elected chairman of the Council of Ministers (the equivalent of being Latvia's Prime Minister), becoming the first premier of the restored Latvian republic.

Оn 8 May 1990, the Supreme Soviet of the Estonian SSR adopted a law officially declaring the reinstatement of the 1938 Constitution of the independent Republic of Estonia.

==== Caucasus ====
During the first week of January 1990, in the Azerbaijani exclave of Nakhchivan, the Popular Front led crowds in the storming and destruction of the frontier fences and watchtowers along the border with Iran, and thousands of Soviet Azerbaijanis crossed the border to meet their ethnic cousins in Iranian Azerbaijan.

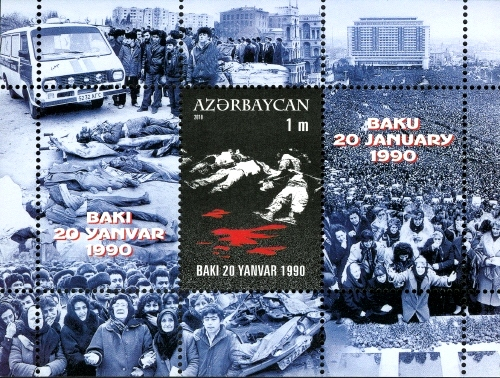
Azerbaijani stamp with photos of the anti-communist Black January protests and crackdown

Ethnic tensions had escalated between the Armenians and Azerbaijanis in spring and summer 1988. On 9 January 1990, after the Armenian parliament voted to include Nagorno-Karabakh within its budget, renewed fighting broke out, hostages were taken, and four Soviet soldiers were killed. On 11 January, Popular Front radicals stormed party buildings and effectively overthrew the communist powers in the southern town of Lenkoran. Gorbachev resolved to regain control of Azerbaijan; the events that ensued are known as "Black January". Late on 19 January 1990, after blowing up the central television station and cutting the phone and radio lines, 26,000 Soviet troops entered the Azerbaijani capital Baku, smashing barricades, attacking protesters, and firing into crowds. On that night and during subsequent confrontations (which lasted until February), more than 130 people died. Most of these were civilians. More than 700 civilians were wounded, hundreds were detained, but only a few were actually tried for alleged criminal offenses.

Civil liberties suffered. Soviet Defence Minister Dmitry Yazov stated that the use of force in Baku was intended to prevent the de facto takeover of the Azerbaijani government by the non-communist opposition, to prevent their victory in upcoming free elections (scheduled for March 1990), to destroy them as a political force, and to ensure that the Communist government remained in power.

The army had gained control of Baku, but by 20 January it had essentially lost Azerbaijan. Nearly the entire population of Baku turned out for the mass funerals of "martyrs" buried in the Alley of Martyrs. Thousands of Communist Party members publicly burned their party cards. First Secretary Vezirov decamped to Moscow and Ayaz Mutalibov was appointed his successor in a free vote of party officials. The ethnic Russian Viktor Polyanichko remained second secretary. In reaction to the Soviet actions in Baku, Sakina Aliyeva, Chair of the Presidium of the Supreme Soviet of the Nakhchivan Autonomous Soviet Socialist Republic called a special session where it was debated whether or not Nakhchivan could secede from the USSR under Article 81 of the Soviet Constitution. Deciding that it was legal, deputies prepared a declaration of independence, which Aliyeva signed and presented on 20 January on national television. It was the first declaration of secession by a recognized region in the USSR. Aliyeva and the Nakhchivan Soviet's actions were denounced by government officials who forced her to resign and the attempt at independence was aborted.

Following the hardliners' takeover, the 30 September 1990 elections (runoffs on 14 October) were characterized by intimidation; several Popular Front candidates were jailed, two were murdered, and unabashed ballot stuffing took place, even in the presence of Western observers. The election results reflected the threatening environment; out of the 350 members, 280 were Communists, with only 45 opposition candidates from the Popular Front and other non-communist groups, who together formed a Democratic Bloc ("Dembloc"). In May 1990 Mutalibov was elected chairman of the Supreme Soviet unopposed.

On 23 August 1990, the Supreme Soviet of the Armenian SSR adopted the Declaration of Independence of Armenia. The document proclaimed the independent Republic of Armenia with its own symbols, army, financial institutions, foreign and tax policy.

==== Western republics ====
On 21 January 1990, Rukh organized a 300-mile (480 km) human chain between Kiev, Lviv, and Ivano-Frankivsk. Hundreds of thousands joined hands to commemorate the proclamation of Ukrainian independence in 1918 and the reunification of Ukrainian lands one year later (1919 Unification Act). On 23 January 1990, the Ukrainian Greek-Catholic Church held its first synod since its liquidation by the Soviets in 1946 (an act which the gathering declared invalid). On 9 February 1990, the Ukrainian Ministry of Justice officially registered Rukh. However, the registration came too late for Rukh to field its own candidates for the parliamentary and local elections on 4 March. At those 1990 elections of people's deputies to the Supreme Council (Verkhovna Rada), candidates from the Democratic Bloc won landslide victories in western Ukrainian oblasts. A majority of the seats had to hold run-off elections. On 18 March, Democratic candidates scored further victories in the run-offs. The Democratic Bloc gained about 90 out of 450 seats in the new parliament.

On 6 April 1990, the Lviv City Council voted to return St. George Cathedral to the Ukrainian Greek Catholic Church. The Russian Orthodox Church refused to yield. On 29–30 April 1990, the Ukrainian Helsinki Union disbanded to form the Ukrainian Republican Party. On 15 May the new parliament convened. The bloc of conservative communists held 239 seats; the Democratic Bloc, which had evolved into the National Council, had 125 deputies. On 4 June 1990, two candidates remained in the protracted race for parliament chair. The leader of the Communist Party of Ukraine (CPU), Volodymyr Ivashko, was elected with 60 percent of the vote as more than 100 opposition deputies boycotted the election. On 5–6 June 1990, Metropolitan Mstyslav of the U.S.-based Ukrainian Orthodox Church was elected patriarch of the Ukrainian Autocephalous Orthodox Church (UAOC) during that Church's first synod. The UAOC declared its full independence from the Moscow Patriarchate of the Russian Orthodox Church, which in March had granted autonomy to the Ukrainian Orthodox church headed by the Metropolitan Filaret.

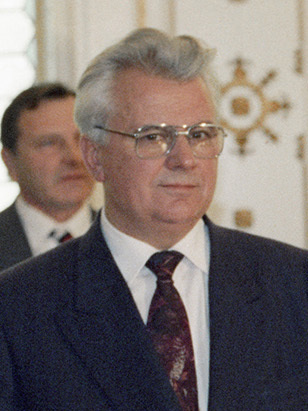
Leonid Kravchuk became Ukraine's leader in 1990.

On 22 June 1990, Volodymyr Ivashko withdrew his candidacy for leader of the Communist Party of Ukraine in view of his new position in parliament. Stanislav Hurenko was elected first secretary of the CPU. On 11 July, Ivashko resigned from his post as chairman of the Ukrainian Parliament after he was elected deputy general secretary of the Communist Party of the Soviet Union. The Parliament accepted the resignation a week later, on 18 July. On 16 July Parliament overwhelmingly approved the Declaration on State Sovereignty of Ukraine – with a vote of 355 in favour and four against. The people's deputies voted 339 to 5 to proclaim 16 July a Ukrainian national holiday.

On 23 July 1990, Leonid Kravchuk was elected to replace Ivashko as parliament chairman. On 30 July, Parliament adopted a resolution on military service ordering Ukrainian soldiers "in regions of national conflict such as Armenia and Azerbaijan" to return to Ukrainian territory. On August 1, Parliament voted overwhelmingly to shut down the Chernobyl Nuclear Power Plant. On 3 August, it adopted a law on the economic sovereignty of the Ukrainian republic. On 19 August, the first Ukrainian Catholic liturgy in 44 years was celebrated at St. George Cathedral. On 5–7 September, the International Symposium on the Great Famine of 1932–1933 was held in Kiev. On 8 September, The first "Youth for Christ" rally since 1933 took place held in Lviv, with 40,000 participants. In 28–30 September, the Green Party of Ukraine held its founding congress. On 30 September, nearly 100,000 people marched in Kiev to protest against the new union treaty proposed by Gorbachev.

On 1 October 1990, parliament reconvened amid mass protests calling for the resignations of Kravchuk and of Prime Minister Vitaliy Masol, a leftover from the previous regime. Students erected a tent city on October Revolution Square, where they continued the protest.

On 17 October Masol resigned, and on 20 October, Patriarch Mstyslav I of Kiev and all Ukraine arrived at Saint Sophia's Cathedral, ending a 46-year banishment from his homeland. On 23 October 1990, Parliament voted to delete Article 6 of the Ukrainian Constitution, which referred to the "leading role" of the Communist Party.

On 25–28 October 1990, Rukh held its second congress and declared that its principal goal was the "renewal of independent statehood for Ukraine". On 28 October UAOC faithful, supported by Ukrainian Catholics, demonstrated near St. Sophia's Cathedral as newly elected Russian Orthodox Church Patriarch Aleksei and Metropolitan Filaret celebrated liturgy at the shrine. On 1 November, the leaders of the Ukrainian Greek Catholic Church and of the Ukrainian Autocephalous Orthodox Church, respectively, Metropolitan Volodymyr Sterniuk and Patriarch Mstyslav, met in Lviv during anniversary commemorations of the 1918 proclamation of the Western Ukrainian National Republic.

On 18 November 1990, the Ukrainian Autocephalous Orthodox Church enthroned Mstyslav as Patriarch of Kiev and all Ukraine during ceremonies at Saint Sophia's Cathedral. Also on 18 November, Canada announced that its consul-general to Kiev would be Ukrainian-Canadian Nestor Gayowsky. On 19 November, the United States announced that its consul to Kiev would be Ukrainian-American John Stepanchuk. On 19 November, the chairmen of the Ukrainian and Russian parliaments, respectively, Kravchuk and Yeltsin, signed a 10-year bilateral pact. In early December 1990 the Party of Democratic Rebirth of Ukraine was founded; on 15 December, the Democratic Party of Ukraine was founded.

On 27 July 1990 the Supreme Soviet of the Byelorussian SSR passed a Declaration of State Sovereignty, asserting its sovereignty as a republic inside the Soviet Union.

==== Central Asian republics ====
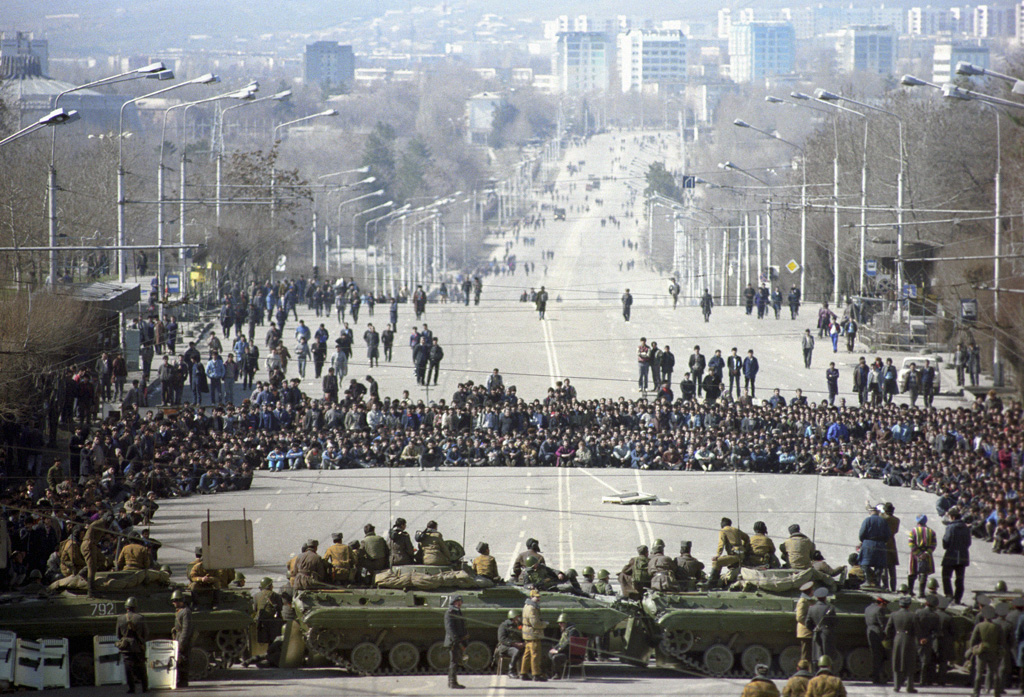
Tajik nationalist protesters squared off against the Soviet Army during the 1990 Dushanbe riots.

On 12–14 February 1990, anti-government riots took place in Tajikistan's capital, Dushanbe, as tensions rose between nationalist Tajiks and ethnic Armenian refugees, after the Sumgait pogrom and anti-Armenian riots in Azerbaijan in 1988. A state of emergency was declared in the capital on 12 February following disturbances caused by demonstrators at the republican party headquarters demanding that the refugees leave Tajikistan. Demonstrations sponsored by the nationalist Rastokhez movement turned violent. Radical economic and political reforms were demanded by the protesters, who torched government buildings; shops and other businesses were attacked and looted. During these riots 26 people were killed and 565 injured.

In June 1990, the city of Osh and its environs experienced bloody ethnic clashes between ethnic Kirghiz nationalist group Osh Aymaghi and Uzbek nationalist group Adolat over the land of a former collective farm. There were about 1,200 casualties, including over 300 dead and 462 seriously injured. The riots broke out over the division of land resources in and around the city.

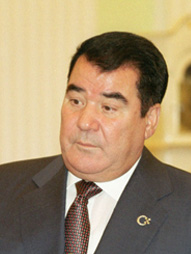
Saparmurat Niyazov, last head of the Turkmen SSR, and first president of Turkmenistan

In Turkmen SSR, the national conservative People's Democratic Movement became a supporter of independence, uniting the Turkmen intelligentsia with moderate and radical Turkmen nationalists. They did not have a pronounced and eminent leader. Since 1989, small rallies have been held in Ashghabad and Krasnovodsk for the independence of Turkmenistan, as well as for the assignment of the status of the "state language" to the Turkmen language in the republic. The rallies also demanded that the republican leadership leave most of the oil revenues in the republic itself, and "not feed Moscow". Turkmen oppositionists and dissidents actively cooperated with opposition from Uzbekistan, Azerbaijan and Georgia. The leadership of Soviet Turkmenistan, led by Saparmurat Niyazov, opposed independence, suppressing Turkmen dissidents and oppositionists, but following the elections to the Supreme Soviet of the Turkmen SSR in January 1990, several dissidents were able to be elected to the republican parliament as independent candidates, who, together with their supporters, managed to actively participate in political life and express their opinions.

The role of the Communist Party of Turkmenistan was very strong in this republic, especially in the west and south, where the Russian-speaking population lived. Over 90% of the seats in the republican parliament were held by communists. Despite all of the above, during the dissolution of the USSR, there were practically no high-profile events in Turkmenistan, and the Turkmen SSR was considered by the CPSU to be one of the "most exemplary and loyal republics" of the Soviet Union to Moscow.

=== 1991 ===
Following Georgia's declaration of independence in 1991, South Ossetia (orange) and Abkhazia (purple) declared their desire to leave Georgia and remain part of the Soviet Union/Russia.

==== Moscow's crisis ====
On 14 January 1991, Nikolai Ryzhkov resigned from his post as Chairman of the Council of Ministers, or premier of the Soviet Union, and was succeeded by Valentin Pavlov in the newly established post of Prime Minister of the Soviet Union. On 17 March 1991, in a Union-wide referendum 77.85% percent of voters endorsed retention of a reformed Soviet Union. The Baltic republics, Armenia, Georgia, and Moldova boycotted the referendum as well as Checheno-Ingushetia (an autonomous republic within Russia that had a strong desire for independence, and by now referred to itself as Ichkeria). In each of the other nine republics, a majority of the voters supported the retention of a reformed Soviet Union, the same in the Georgian regions of South Ossetia and Abkhazia who also voted for the continuation of the state.

==== Russia's President Boris Yeltsin ====
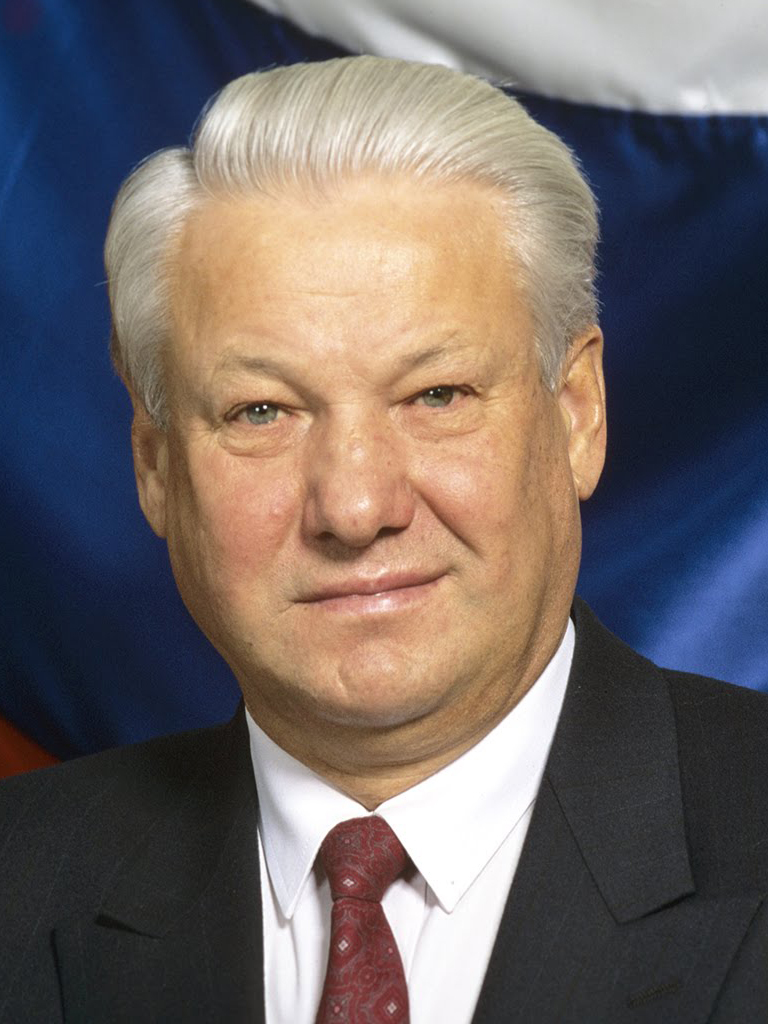
Boris Yeltsin, Russia's first democratically elected president

On 12 June 1991, Boris Yeltsin was elected President of the Russian Soviet Federative Socialist Republic with 57 percent of the popular vote in the country's first Presidential election, defeating Gorbachev's preferred candidate, Nikolai Ryzhkov, who won 16 percent of the vote. Following Yeltsin's election as president, the RSFSR declared itself autonomous from the Soviet Union. In his election campaign, Yeltsin criticized the "dictatorship of the center", but did not yet suggest that he would introduce a market economy.

==== The Caucasus: Georgia takes the lead ====
In response to the USSR-wide referendum, on 31 March 1991, an independence referendum was held on the matter of Georgian independence. Boycotted by the South Ossetian and Abkhaz minorities, who showed up in the all-Union plebiscite earlier that month, a record 99.5% of Georgian voters voted for the restoration of Georgian independence as against 0.5% against. Voter turnout was 90.6%.

On 9 April 1991, two years after the massacres in Tbilisi and a year and two months after Lithuania's declaration of restored independence, the Supreme Council of the Georgian SSR in plenary session declared the formal reconstitution of Georgia's independence from the Soviet Union, 70 years after the Soviet Armed Forces overthrew the Democratic Republic. This landmark declaration of independence by Georgia made it the first of the Caucasian republics to officially secede from the Soviet Union and the 3rd republic overall so far.

==== Baltic republics ====
On 13 January 1991, Soviet troops, along with the KGB Spetsnaz Alpha Group, stormed the Vilnius TV Tower in Lithuania to suppress the independence movement. Fourteen unarmed civilians were killed and hundreds more injured. On the night of 31 July, Russian OMON from Riga, the Soviet military headquarters in the Baltics, assaulted the Lithuanian border post in Medininkai, and killed seven Lithuanian servicemen. This event further weakened the Soviet Union's position internationally and domestically, and stiffened Lithuanian resistance.

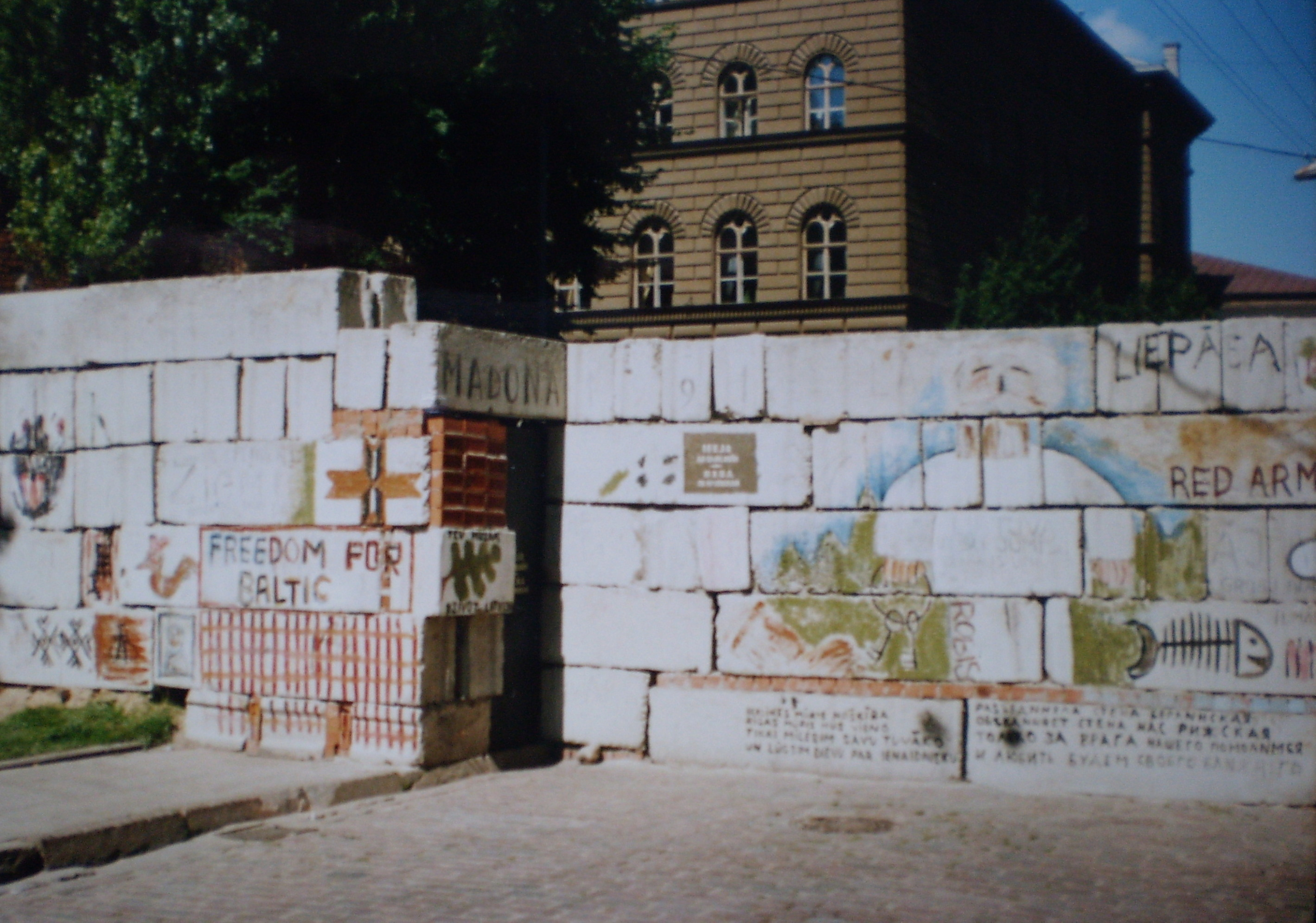
Barricade erected in Riga to prevent the Soviet Army from reaching the Latvian Saeima, July 1991

The bloody attacks in Lithuania prompted Latvians to organize defensive barricades (the events are still today known as "The Barricades") blocking access to strategically important buildings and bridges in Riga. Soviet attacks in the ensuing days resulted in six deaths and several injuries; one person died later of their wounds.

Оn 9 February, Lithuania held an independence referendum with 93.2% voting in favor of independence.

On 12 February, the independence of Lithuania was recognized by Iceland.

On 3 March, a referendum was held on the independence of the Republic of Estonia, which was attended by those who lived in Estonia before the Soviet annexation and their descendants, as well as persons who have received the so-called "green cards" of the Congress of Estonia. 77.8% of those who voted supported the idea of restoring independence.

On 11 March, Denmark recognized Estonia's independence.

When Estonia reaffirmed its independence during the coup (see below) in the dark hours of 20 August 1991, at 11:03 pm Tallinn time, many Estonian volunteers surrounded the Tallinn TV Tower in an attempt to prepare to cut off the communication channels after the Soviet troops seized it and refused to be intimidated by the Soviet troops. When Edgar Savisaar confronted the Soviet troops for ten minutes, they finally retreated from the TV tower after a failed resistance against the Estonians.

==== August coup attempt ====
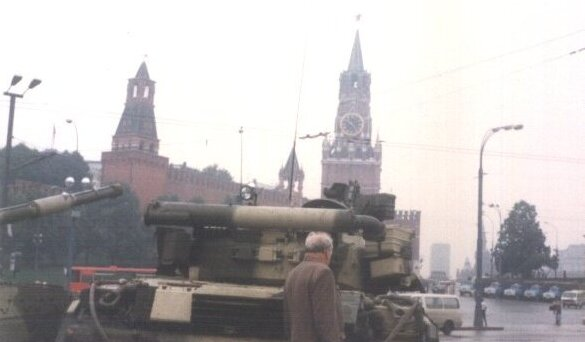
Soviet T-80UD tanks in the Red Square during the 1991 coup d'état attempt

Faced with growing separatism, Gorbachev sought to restructure the Soviet Union into a less centralized state. On 20 August, the Russian SFSR was scheduled to sign a New Union Treaty that would have converted the Soviet Union into a federation of independent republics with a common president, foreign policy and military. It was strongly supported by the Central Asian republics, which needed the economic advantages of a common market to prosper. However, it would have meant some degree of continued Communist Party control over economic and social life.

More radical reformists were increasingly convinced that a rapid transition to a market economy was required, even if the eventual outcome meant the disintegration of the Soviet Union into several independent states. Independence also accorded with Yeltsin's desires as president of the RSFSR, as well as those of regional and local authorities to get rid of Moscow's pervasive control. In contrast to the reformers' lukewarm response to the treaty, the conservatives, "patriots", and Russian nationalists of the USSR – still strong within the CPSU and the military – were opposed to weakening the Soviet state and its centralized power structure.

On 19 August 1991, Gorbachev's vice president, Gennady Yanayev, Prime Minister Valentin Pavlov, Defense Minister Dmitry Yazov, KGB chief Vladimir Kryuchkov and other senior officials acted to prevent the union treaty from being signed by forming the "General Committee on the State Emergency", which put Gorbachev – on holiday in Foros, Crimea – under house arrest and cut off his communications. The coup leaders issued an emergency decree suspending political activity and banning most newspapers.

Thousands of Muscovites came out to defend the White House (the Russian Federation's parliament and Yeltsin's office), the symbolic seat of Russian sovereignty at the time. The organizers of the coup tried but ultimately failed to arrest Yeltsin, who rallied opposition to the coup by making speeches from atop a tank. The special forces dispatched by the coup leaders took up positions near the White House, but members refused to storm the barricaded building. The coup leaders also neglected to jam foreign news broadcasts, so many Muscovites watched it unfold live on CNN. Even the isolated Gorbachev was able to stay abreast of developments by tuning into the BBC World Service on a small transistor radio.

After three days, on 21 August 1991, the coup collapsed. The organizers were detained and Gorbachev was reinstated as president, albeit with his power much depleted.

==== August-December transition period ====
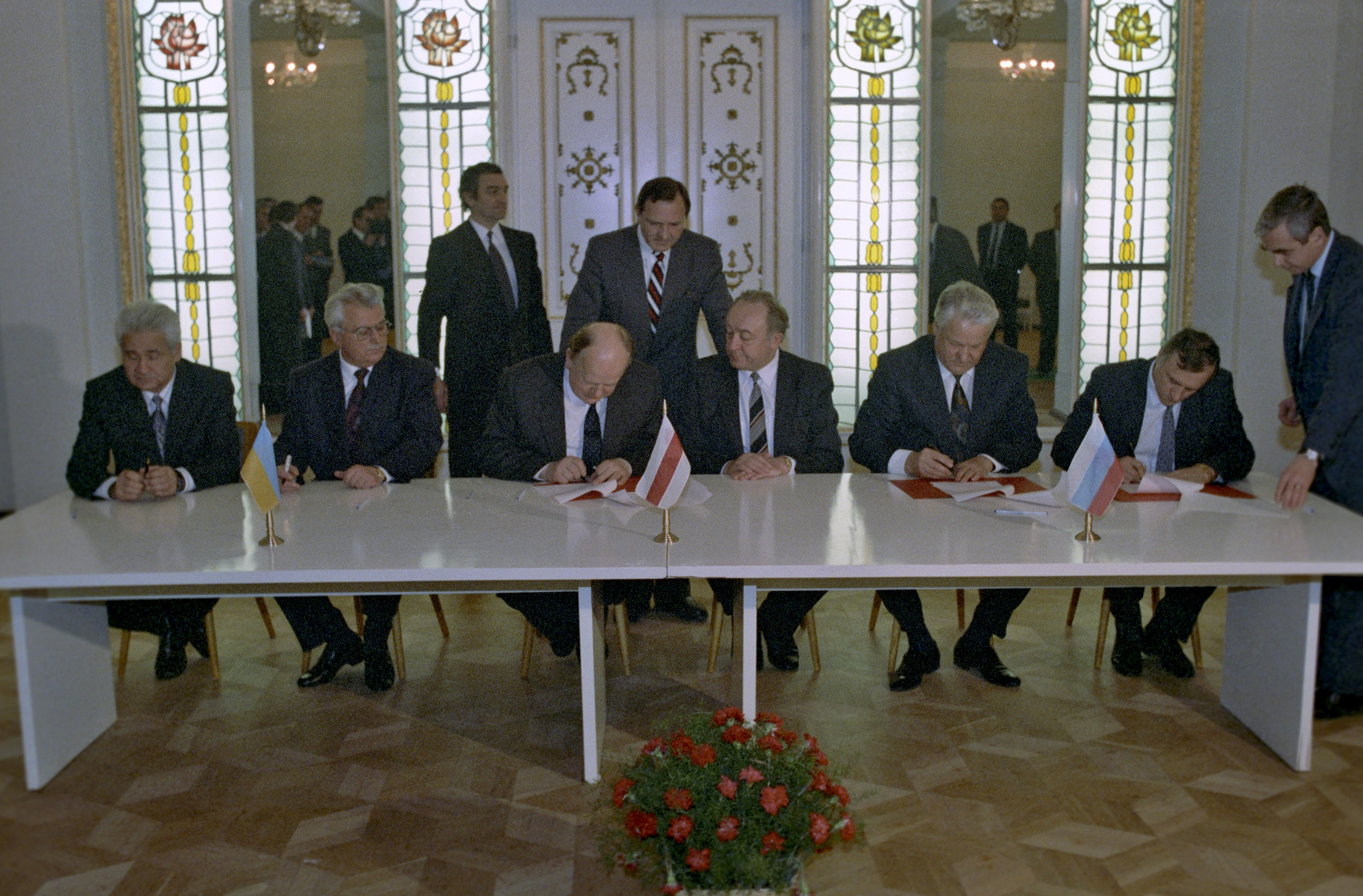
Signing of the Belovezh Accords to establish the Commonwealth of Independent States, 8 December 1991

On 24 August 1991, Gorbachev resigned as general secretary of the CPSU and dissolved all party units in the government. On the same day, the Supreme Soviet of the Ukrainian SSR passed a Declaration of Independence of Ukraine, calling for a national referendum on the independence of Ukraine from the Soviet Union. Five days later, the Supreme Soviet of the Soviet Union indefinitely suspended all CPSU activity on Soviet territory, effectively ending Communist rule in the Soviet Union and dissolving the only remaining unifying force in the country. Gorbachev established a State Council of the Soviet Union on 5 September, designed to bring him and the highest officials of the remaining republics into a collective leadership. The State Council was also empowered to appoint a premier of the Soviet Union. The premiership never functioned properly, though Ivan Silayev de facto took the post through the Committee on the Operational Management of the Soviet Economy and the Inter-Republican Economic Committee and tried to form a government, though with rapidly shrinking powers.

The Soviet Union collapsed with dramatic speed in the last quarter of 1991. Between August and December, 10 republics seceded from the union, largely out of fear of another coup. By the end of September, Gorbachev no longer had the ability to influence events outside of Moscow. He was challenged even there by Yeltsin, who had begun taking over what remained of the Soviet government, including the Kremlin.

The Soviet Union recognized the independence of Baltic republics on 6 September 1991. Georgia cut all ties with the Soviet Union on 7 September, citing the failure to receive a "sufficiently grounded answer" as to why the USSR did not recognise its independence when it had recognised the Baltic States' secession.

On 17 September 1991, General Assembly resolution numbers 46/4, 46/5, and 46/6 admitted Estonia, Latvia, and Lithuania to the United Nations, conforming to Security Council resolution numbers 709, 710, and 711 passed on 12 September without a vote.

On 6 November, Yeltsin – who had by then taken over much of the Soviet government – issued a decree banning all Communist Party activities on Russian territory.

By 7 November 1991, most newspapers referred to the 'former Soviet Union'.

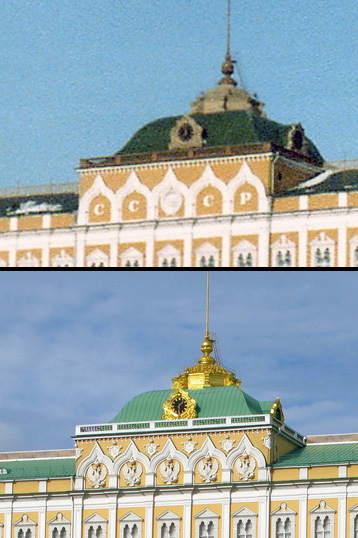
The state emblem of the Soviet Union and the СССР letters (Note: Russian acronym for "USSR") (top) in the façade of the Grand Kremlin Palace were replaced by five double-headed Russian eagles (bottom) after the dissolution of the Soviet Union, the eagles having been removed by the Bolsheviks after the revolution.

The final round of the Soviet Union's collapse began on 1 December 1991. That day, a Ukrainian popular referendum resulted in 91 percent of Ukraine's voters voting to affirm the independence declaration passed in August and formally secede from the Union. The secession of Ukraine, long second only to Russia in economic and political power, ended any realistic chance of Gorbachev keeping the Soviet Union together even on a limited scale. The leaders of the three Slavic republics, Russia, Ukraine, and Belarus (formerly Byelorussia), agreed to discuss possible alternatives to the union.

On 8 December, the leaders of Russia, Ukraine, and Belarus secretly met in Belavezhskaya Pushcha, in western Belarus, and signed the Belavezha Accords, which proclaimed the Soviet Union had ceased to exist and announced formation of the Commonwealth of Independent States (CIS) as a looser association to take its place. They also invited other republics to join the CIS. Gorbachev called it an unconstitutional coup. However, by this time there was no longer any reasonable doubt that, as the preamble of the Accords put it, the Soviet Union no longer existed "as a subject of international law and a geopolitical reality".

On 10 December, the agreement was ratified by the Verkhovna Rada of Ukraine and the Supreme Council of Belarus.

On 12 December, the Supreme Soviet of the Russian SFSR formally ratified the Belavezha Accords, denounced the 1922 Union Treaty, and recalled the Russian deputies from the Supreme Soviet of the USSR. The legality of this ratification raised doubts among some members of the Russian parliament, since according to the 1978 RSFSR Constitution consideration of this document was in the exclusive jurisdiction of the Congress of People's Deputies of the RSFSR. Additionally, the Soviet Constitution did not allow a republic to unilaterally recall its deputies. However, no one in either Russia or the Kremlin objected. Any objections from the latter would have likely had no effect, since what was left of the Soviet government had effectively been rendered impotent long before December. A number of lawyers believe that the denunciation of the union treaty was meaningless since it became invalid in 1924 with the adoption of the first constitution of the USSR (in 1996 the State Duma had voiced the same position). Later that day, Gorbachev hinted for the first time that he was considering stepping down. On the surface, it appeared that the largest republic had formally seceded. However, this is not the case. Rather, Russia apparently took the line that it did not need to follow the secession process delineated in the Soviet Constitution because it was not possible to secede from a country that no longer existed.

On 16 December 1991, the Kazakh SSR became the last republic to formally secede from the Soviet Union, causing the Soviet Union to neither control any territory nor claim to control any territory (although Soviet embassies still existed).

On 17 December 1991, along with 28 European countries, the European Economic Community, and four non-European countries, the three Baltic Republics and nine of the twelve remaining Soviet republics signed the European Energy Charter in the Hague as sovereign states. On the same day, members of the lower house of the union parliament (Council of the Union) held a meeting of People's Deputies of the Soviet Union. The meeting adopted a statement in connection with the signing of the Belovezha Accords and its ratification by the parliaments of Russia, Belarus and Ukraine, in which it noted that it considers the decisions made on the liquidation of state power and administration bodies illegal and not meeting the current situation and the vital interests of the peoples and stated that in the event further complication of the situation in the country reserves the right to convene in the future the Congress of People's Deputies of the USSR.

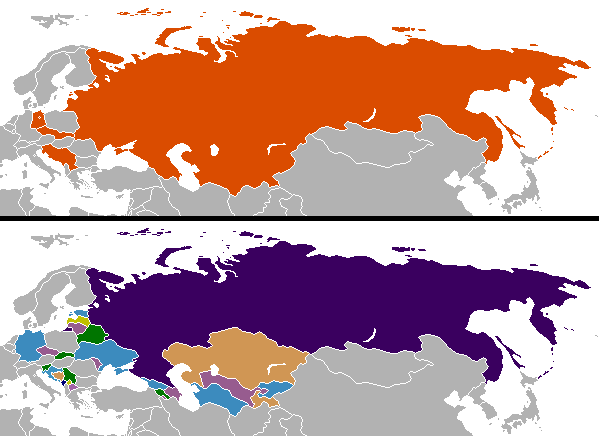
Changes in national boundaries after the Cold War.

On 18 December, the upper chamber of the Supreme Soviet of the USSR (Council of Republics) adopted a statement accepting the Agreement on the creation of the Commonwealth of Independent States and considering it to provide a way out of the acute political and economic crisis.

Gorbachev met with Yeltsin and accepted the fait accompli of the Soviet Union's dissolution. On the same day as the Alma-Ata Protocol was signed, aimed to dissolve the Soviet Union and formally establish the Commonwealth of Independent States, the Supreme Soviet of the Russian SFSR adopted a statute to change Russia's legal name from "Russian Soviet Federative Socialist Republic" to "Russian Federation", showing that it was now a fully sovereign non-communist state.

Doubts remained over whether the Belavezha Accords had legally dissolved the Soviet Union, since they were signed by only three republics. However, on 21 December, representatives of 11 of the 12 remaining republics – all except Georgia – signed the Alma-Ata Protocol, which confirmed the dissolution of the Soviet Union and formally established the CIS. They also "accepted" Gorbachev's resignation. The command of the Armed Forces of the USSR was entrusted to the Minister of Defense Yevgeny Shaposhnikov. Even at this moment, Gorbachev had not made any formal plans to leave the scene yet. However, with a majority of republics now agreeing that the Soviet Union no longer existed, Gorbachev bowed to the inevitable, telling CBS News that he would resign as soon as he saw that the CIS was indeed a reality.

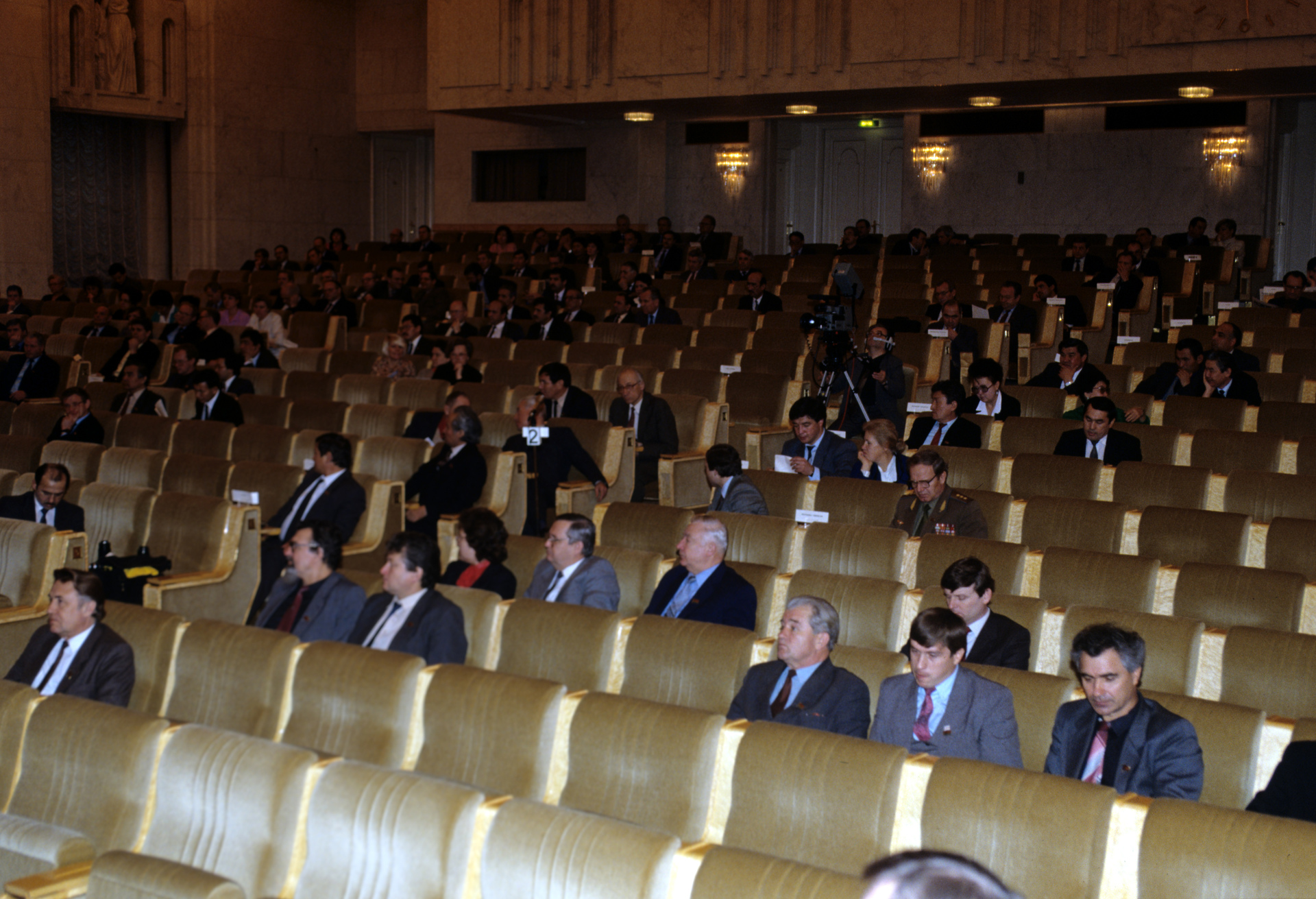
The upper chamber of the Supreme Soviet in its ultimate session, voting the USSR out of existence, 26 December 1991.

The Declaration of the Twelve (Belgium, Denmark, France, Germany, Greece, Ireland, Italy, Luxembourg, Portugal, Spain, the Netherlands and the United Kingdom) on the future status of Russia and other former Soviet Republics was published on 23 December 1991, according to which "The European Community and its Member States have noted with satisfaction the decision of the participants at the Alma Ata meeting on 21 December 1991 to establish a Commonwealth of Independent States. They note that the international rights and obligations of the former USSR, including those arising from the Charter of the United Nations, will continue to be exercised by Russia. They note with satisfaction the acceptance by the Russian Government of these commitments and responsibilities and will continue to deal with Russia on this basis, taking into account the change in its constitutional status. They are prepared to recognise the other Republics constituting the Community as soon as they receive assurances from those Republics that they are prepared to fulfil the requirements set out in the "Guidelines on the Recognition of New States in Eastern Europe and the Soviet Union", adopted by Ministers on 16 December 1991. They expect, in particular, that those Republics will give them assurances that they will fulfil their international obligations arising from treaties and agreements concluded by the Soviet Union, including the ratification and implementation of the CFE Treaty by the Republics to which it applies, and that they will establish a single control over nuclear weapons and their non-proliferation."

In a nationally televised speech in the evening of 25 December, Gorbachev resigned as president of the Soviet Union – or, as he put it, "I hereby discontinue my activities at the post of President of the Union of Soviet Socialist Republics." He declared the office extinct, and ceded all of its powers (such as control of the nuclear arsenal) to Yeltsin.

On the night of 25 December, at 7:35 p.m. Moscow time, after Gorbachev appeared on television, the Soviet flag was lowered and the Russian tricolor raised in its place at 7:45 pm, symbolically marking the end of the Soviet Union. In his parting words, Gorbachev defended his record on domestic reform and détente, but conceded, "The old system collapsed before a new one had time to start working." On that same day, the president of the United States George H. W. Bush held a brief televised speech officially recognizing the independence of the 11 remaining republics.

Gorbachev's speech, as well as the replacement of the Soviet flag with the Russian flag, symbolically marked the end of the Soviet Union. However, the final legal step in the Soviet Union's demise came on 26 December, when the Soviet of Nationalities, the upper chamber of the Supreme Soviet of the Soviet Union, ratified the Belavezha Accords, effectively voting the Soviet Union out of existence (the lower chamber, the Soviet of the Union, had been unable to work since 12 December, when the recall of the Russian deputies left it without a quorum). The following day Yeltsin moved into Gorbachev's former office, though the Russian authorities had taken over the suite two days earlier. The Soviet Armed Forces were placed under the command of the Commonwealth of Independent States, but were eventually subsumed by the newly independent republics, with the bulk becoming the Armed Forces of the Russian Federation. By the end of 1991, the few remaining Soviet institutions that had not been taken over by Russia ceased operation, and individual republics assumed the central government's role.

Other issues were also addressed at Alma-Ata on 21 December 1991, including UN membership. In a document additional to the main Alma-Ata Declaration, Russia was authorized to assume the Soviet Union's UN membership, including its permanent seat on the Security Council. The Soviet ambassador to the UN delivered a letter signed by Russian president Yeltsin to the UN Secretary-General dated 24 December 1991, informing him that "with the support of the countries of the Commonwealth of Independent States", Russia was the successor state to the USSR. After being circulated among the other UN member states, Russia attended the UN Security Council meeting on the last day of the year, 31 December 1991, with no objection raised. But questions of state succession, settlement of external debt, and division of assets abroad remain disputed between Russia and Ukraine to this day.

In April 1992, the Congress of People's Deputies of Russia refused to ratify the Belovezhskaya Agreements and to exclude references to the Constitution and laws of the USSR from the text of the Constitution of the RSFSR. According to some Russian politicians, this was one of the reasons for the political crisis of September – October 1993. In a referendum on 12 December 1993, a new Russian constitution was adopted, in which there was no mention of the union state.

== Consequences ==
Russian GDP since the end of the Soviet Union

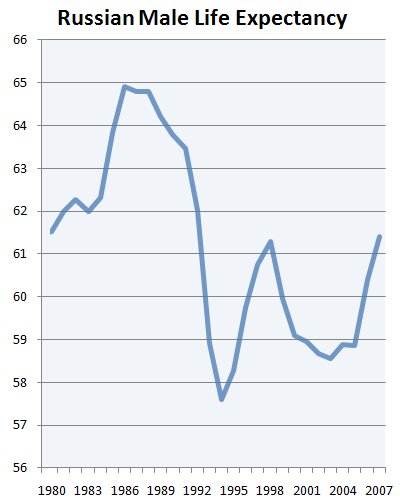
Russian male life expectancy, 1980–2007

=== Economic decline and excess mortality ===
In the decades following the end of the Cold War, only five or six of the post-Soviet states are on a path to joining the wealthy capitalist states of the West, and most are falling behind, some to such an extent that over 50 years will be needed before they catch up to how they were before the dissolution of the Soviet Union. As of 2011, the experience of former Soviet republics is largely negative, with most states having suffered extreme Gross Domestic Product (GDP) loss, developmental stagnation, low happiness, and population decline.

GDP decline in post-Soviet nations was substantial and averaged roughly 51%. From 1990 to 2000, GDP decline numbered:

- 63% in Armenia
- 60% in Azerbaijan
- 35% in Belarus
- 35% in Estonia
- 78% in Georgia
- 41% in Kazakhstan
- 50% in Kyrgyzstan
- 51% in Latvia
- 44% in Lithuania
- 63% in Moldova
- 40% in Russia
- 50% in Tajikistan
- 48% in Turkmenistan
- 59% in Ukraine

Russia experienced the largest drop in life expectancy during peacetime in recorded history after the fall of the USSR. Poverty skyrocketed after the fall of the USSR, and by the end of the 1990s the number of people living below the international poverty went from 3% in 1987–88 to 20% or around 88 million people. Only 4% of the region lived on $4 a day or less but by 1994 this number skyrocketed to 32%. Crime, alcohol use, drug use and suicides all skyrocketed after the fall of the Eastern Bloc.

In a 2001 study by the economist Steven Rosefielde, he calculated that there were 3.4 million premature deaths in Russia from 1990 to 1998, which he partly blames on the "shock therapy" that came with the Washington Consensus. A 2017 study estimates 7 million premature deaths occurred overall as a result of shock therapy. A 2026 Lancet preprint accounting for demographic shift and hampered development estimated 8.4 million excess deaths from 1991–2002 in former Soviet States due to its dissolution, with 16.9 million by 2019.

Sex trafficking also exploded in post-Soviet States due to governmental dysfunction, worsened material conditions, and political instability. A 2010 review found at least 500,000 Russian women had been sex trafficked post-dissolution, with an average of 20,000–60,000 women trafficked annually in Russia since Soviet collapse.

=== Post-Soviet conflicts ===
As the Soviet Union began to collapse, social disintegration and political instability fueled a surge in ethnic conflict. Social and economic disparities, along with ethnic friction, created an upsurge in nationalism and discrimination between groups. In particular, disputes over territorial boundaries have been the source of conflict between states experiencing political transition and upheaval. Territorial conflicts often involve disputes related to reunion of ethnic groups, shifting former USSR boundaries, and pre-USSR land claims. Minority groups consistently contribute to territorial fights, regularly opposing election outcomes to seek autonomy.

Additionally, legacies from the Soviet and pre-Soviet eras, along with the suddenness of the actual sociopolitical change, have resulted in conflict throughout the region.

The only wars that have broken out between former Soviet Republics are the Russo-Georgian War, the Russo–Ukrainian War, the Nagorno-Karabakh conflict, and the Second Nagorno-Karabakh war. In 2021, there was a three day border conflict between Kyrgyzstan and Tajikistan.

=== China ===
After decades of hardship following the Sino-Soviet split, the People's Republic of China entered a gradual rapprochement with the Soviet Union in 1989 when Gorbachev visited the country. Afterwards, the border treaty was demarcated in 1991, and they signed the Treaty of Good-Neighborliness and Friendly Cooperation in 2001, which was renewed in June 2021 for five more years. Both countries are members of the Shanghai Cooperation Organisation which was founded in 1996.

On the eve of a 2013 state visit to Moscow by Chinese leader Xi Jinping, Russian president Vladimir Putin remarked that the two nations were forging a special relationship. The two countries have enjoyed close relations militarily, economically, and politically, while supporting each other on various global issues. Commentators have debated whether the bilateral strategic partnership constitutes an alliance. Russia and China officially declared their relations 'Not allies, but better than allies'. The relations between the two countries are currently being put to the test after Russia invading Ukraine. Unlike in the Soviet era, Putin ruled Russia as increasingly China's "junior partner".

=== Cuba ===
The "Special Period", officially known as the "Special Period in the Time of Peace" was an extended period of economic crisis in Cuba that began in 1991 It was defined primarily by extreme reductions of rationed foods at state-subsidized prices, the severe shortages of hydrocarbon energy resources in the form of gasoline, diesel, and other petroleum derivatives that occurred upon the implosion of economic agreements between the petroleum-rich Soviet Union and Cuba, and the shrinking of an economy reliant upon Soviet imports.

During its existence, the Soviet Union provided Cuba with large amounts of oil, food, and machinery. In the years following the collapse of the Soviet Union, Cuba's gross domestic product shrunk 35%, imports and exports both fell over 80%, and many domestic industries shrank considerably. In a speculated attempt to re-join the IMF and the World Bank, executive director Jacques de Groote and another IMF official were invited to Havana in late 1993. After assessing the economic situation in the country they concluded that from 1989 to 1993, Cuba's economic decline was more grave than that experienced by any other socialist Eastern European country.

In 1993 a series of economic reforms began to go into effect, initially enacted to offset the economic imbalances which was a result of the dissolution of the Soviet Union in 1991. The main aspect of these reforms was to legalize the then illegal U.S. Dollar and regulate its usage in the island's economy.

=== North Korea ===
When the Soviet Union dissolved, it ended all aid and trade concessions such as cheap oil to North Korea. Without Soviet aid, the flow of imports to the North Korean agricultural sector ended, and the government proved to be too inflexible to respond. Energy imports fell by 75%. The economy went into a downward spiral, with imports and exports falling in tandem. Flooded coal mines required electricity to operate pumps, and the shortage of coal worsened the shortage of electricity. Agriculture reliant on electrically powered irrigation systems, artificial fertilizers and pesticides was hit particularly hard by the economic collapse.

=== Israel ===
Between 1989 and 2006, about 1.6 million Soviet Jews and their non-Jewish spouses and their relatives, as defined by the Law of Return, emigrated from the former Soviet Union. About 979,000, or 61%, migrated to Israel.

=== Afghanistan ===
The end of Soviet war in Afghanistan would lead into a civil war mainly between the Soviet-backed Republic of Afghanistan headed by Najibullah and the Mujahadeen alliance known as the Afghan Interim Government-in-Exile. By January 1992, with the loss of his biggest supporter, Najibullah's regime had become internationally isolated. The cut-off of Soviet aid led to food and fuel shortages within the capital.

The breakup of the Soviet Union resulted in Najibullah deciding to consolidate his power over the non-Pashtuns in the north who were mistrusted and considered less loyal to the ruling Homeland Party regime. This came after complaints to Najibullah from his fellow Pashtun Kochis of harassment from an ethnic Tajik general, Abdul Momin. Momin had developed secret ties with the Tajik mujahideen warlord Ahmad Shah Massoud and was passing on secret information to Massoud which led to Najibullah ordering the sacking of Momin which was carried out by Juma Achak, an Achakzai Pashtun who served as Commander of the Northern Zone and was known to hold Pashtun chauvinist views. General Momin was replaced with General Rasul, an ethnic Pashtun Khalqist known for his brutal reputation as commander of Pul-e Charkhi garrison. This move stoked up ethnic tensions between the Pashtun rulers in Kabul and the non-Pashtuns in the north of the country who opposed Najibullah's attempts to restore Pashtun domination over the north of the country. These tensions would lead to the defection of General Abdul Rashid Dostum, an ethnic Uzbek, who began secret negotiations with Tajik rebel leader Massoud, resulting in the formation of Harakat-e Shamal (the Movement of the North). The alliance would topple Najibullah's regime in April 1992.

Following the overthrow of Najibullah a multi-sided civil war would break out, only for the Taliban which was founded in 1994 to rise in 1996. Because of this, U.S. policies in the war are also thought to have contributed to a "blowback" of unintended consequences against American interests, which led to the United States entering into its own war in Afghanistan following the September 11 attacks in 2001, only to end with the US' withdrawal in 2021 and the Taliban regaining control of Afghanistan.

=== Sports and "Unified Team" ===
The breakup of the Soviet Union saw a massive impact in the sporting world. Before its dissolution, the Soviet football team had just qualified for Euro 1992, but its place was instead taken by the CIS national football team. After the tournament, the former Soviet Republics competed as separate independent nations, with FIFA allocating the Soviet team's record to Russia.

Before the start of the 1992 Winter Olympics in Albertville and the Summer Olympics in Barcelona, the Olympic Committee of the Soviet Union formally existed until 12 March 1992, when it disbanded but it was succeeded by the Russian Olympic Committee. However, 12 of the 15 former Soviet Republics competed together as the Unified Team and marched under the Olympic flag in Barcelona, where they finished first in the medal rankings. Separately, Lithuania, Latvia, and Estonia also competed as independent nations in the 1992 Games. The Unified Team also competed in Albertville earlier in the year (represented by six of the twelve ex-republics) and finished second in the medal ranking at those Games. Afterwards, the individual NOCs of the non-Baltic former republics were established. Some NOCs made their debuts at the 1994 Winter Olympic Games in Lillehammer, and others did so at the 1996 Summer Olympic Games in Atlanta.

Members of the Unified Team at the 1992 Summer Olympics in Barcelona consisted of Armenia, Azerbaijan, Belarus, Georgia, Kazakhstan, Kyrgyzstan, Moldova, Russia, Tajikistan, Turkmenistan, Ukraine, and Uzbekistan. At those Summer Games, the Unified Team secured 45 gold medals, 38 silver medals, and 29 bronze medals; four medals more than second-place United States, and 30 more than third-place Germany. In addition to great team success, the Unified Team also saw great personal success. Vitaly Scherbo of Belarus secured six gold medals for the team in gymnastics and also became the most decorated athlete of the Summer Games. Gymnastics, athletics, wrestling, and swimming were the strongest sports for the team, as the four combined earned 28 gold medals and 64 medals in total.

Only six of the countries competed earlier at the 1992 Winter Olympics in Albertville: Armenia, Belarus, Kazakhstan, Russia, Ukraine, and Uzbekistan. The Unified team placed second, three fewer medals than Germany. However, much like the Summer Games, the Unified team had the most decorated medalist in the Winter Games as well, with Lyubov Yegorova of Russia, a cross-country skier winning five total medals.

=== Telecommunications ===
The Soviet Union's calling code of +7 is still used by Russia and Kazakhstan. Between 1993 and 1997, many newly independent republics implemented their own numbering plans such as Belarus (+375) and Ukraine (+380). The Internet domain .su remains in use alongside the internet domains of the newly created countries.

=== Glasnost and "Memorial" ===
The lifting of total censorship and communist propaganda led to disclosure to public of such political and historical issues as the Molotov–Ribbentrop Pact, the Katyn massacre, revision of the Stalinist repressions, revision of the Russian Civil War, the White movement, the New Economic Policy, the 1986 Chernobyl disaster, censorship, pacification and procrastination by the Soviet authorities.

In 1989, the Soviet Union established a civil rights society, Memorial, which specialized in research and recovery of memory for victims of political repressions as well as support for a general human rights movement.

== Chronology of declarations ==
Union republics are shown in bold, and autonomous units that became states with limited recognition are shown in italics. Entities peacefully reincorporated into a post-Soviet republic are not listed.

Incorporated into another state
Not recognized/Semi-recognized states

| Subdivision | Sovereignty proclaimed | Renamed | Independence proclaimed | International recognition |
|---|---|---|---|---|
| Estonian SSR | 16 November 1988 | since 8 May 1990: Republic of Estonia | 8 May 1990 | United Nations membership since 17 September 1991 |
| Lithuanian SSR | 26 May 1989 | since 11 March 1990: Republic of Lithuania | 11 March 1990 | United Nations membership since 17 September 1991 |
| Latvian SSR | 28 July 1989 | since 4 May 1990: Republic of Latvia | 4 May 1990 | United Nations membership since 17 September 1991 |
| Azerbaijan SSR | 23 September 1989 | since 5 February 1991: Republic of Azerbaijan | 18 October 1991 | United Nations membership since 2 March 1992 |
| Georgian SSR | 9 March 1990 | since 14 November 1990: Republic of Georgia | 9 April 1991 | United Nations membership since 31 July 1992 |
| Russian SFSR | 12 June 1990 | since 25 December 1991: Russian Federation | 12 December 1991 | United Nations membership since 24 December 1991 as the successor to the Soviet Union itself |
| Uzbek SSR | 20 June 1990 | since 31 August 1991: Republic of Uzbekistan | 1 September 1991 | United Nations membership since 2 March 1992 |
| Moldavian SSR (Note: Renamed SSR of Moldova in its Declaration of Sovereignty.) | 23 June 1990 | since 23 May 1991: Republic of Moldova | 27 August 1991 | United Nations membership since 2 March 1992 |
| Ukrainian SSR | 16 July 1990 | since 24 August 1991: Ukraine | 24 August 1991 | United Nations membership since 24 October 1945; name change on 24 August 1991 |
| Byelorussian SSR | 27 July 1990 | since 19 September 1991: Republic of Belarus | 25 August 1991 | United Nations membership since 24 October 1945; name change on 19 September 1991 |
| Turkmen SSR | 22 August 1990 | since 27 October 1991: Turkmenistan | 27 October 1991 | United Nations membership since 2 March 1992 |
| Armenian SSR | 23 August 1990 | since 23 August 1990: Republic of Armenia | 21 September 1991 | United Nations membership since 2 March 1992 |
| Tajik SSR | 24 August 1990 | since 31 August 1991: Republic of Tajikistan | 9 September 1991 | United Nations membership since 2 March 1992 |
| Abkhaz ASSR | 25 August 1990 | since 23 July 1992: Republic of Abkhazia | 23 July 1992 (Note: From Georgia.) | Limited recognition and widely considered Russian-occupied territories since 2008 |
| South Ossetian AO | 20 September 1990 | since 18 November 1991: Republic of South Ossetia (Note: South Ossetian Soviet Republic since 28 November 1990; initially South Ossetian Soviet Democratic Republic.) | 29 May 1992 | Limited recognition and widely considered Russian-occupied territories since 2008 |
| Kazakh SSR | 25 October 1990 | since 10 December 1991: Republic of Kazakhstan | 16 December 1991 | United Nations membership since 2 March 1992 |
| Checheno-Ingush ASSR | 27 November 1990 | since 1 November 1991: Chechen Republic (Note: Self-proclaimed in the defunct Checheno-Ingushetia; Ingushetia reincorporated into Russia on 10 December 1992.) | 1 November 1991 | Disestablished in 1999–2000 during the Second Chechen War; reincorporated into Russia on 23 March 2003 |
| Pridnestrovian Moldavian SSR (Note: Self-proclaimed on 2 September 1990; not per-existing administrative unit.) | 8 December 1990 | since 5 November 1991: Pridnestrovian Moldavian Republic | 25 August 1991 (Note: From Moldavia within the Soviet Union; de facto independence upon the dissolution of the Soviet Union.) | Limited recognition and widely considered Russian-occupied territories since 1992 |
| Kirghiz SSR | 15 December 1990 | since 5 February 1991: Republic of Kyrgyzstan | 31 August 1991 | United Nations membership since 2 March 1992 |
| Nagorno-Karabakh AO | 2 September 1991 | since 2 September 1991: Republic of Nagorno-Karabakh | 6 January 1992 (Note: From Azerbaijan.) | Disestablished in 2023 after a decades-long ethnic conflict; territory reincorporated into Azerbaijan |

== Legacy ==
Animated map showing independent states and territorial changes to the Soviet Union in chronological order

In 2013, the American Gallup analytics company found that a majority of citizens in four former Soviet countries regretted the dissolution of the Soviet Union: Armenia, Kyrgyzstan, Russia and Ukraine. In Armenia, 12% of respondents in 2013 said the Soviet collapse did good, while 66% said it did harm. In Kyrgyzstan, 16% of respondents in 2013 said the Soviet collapse did good, while 61% said it did harm. Ever since the Soviet collapse, annual polling by the Levada Center has shown that over 50 percent of Russia's population regretted its collapse. Consistently, 57% of citizens of Russia regretted the collapse of the Soviet Union in a poll in 2014 (while 30 percent said otherwise), and in 2018 a Levada Center poll showed that 66% of Russians lamented the fall of the Soviet Union. In 2005, Russian president Vladimir Putin called the dissolution of the USSR as "the greatest geopolitical catastrophe of the 20th century".

In a similar poll held in February 2005, 50% of respondents in Ukraine stated they regretted the disintegration of the Soviet Union. In 2013, according to Gallup, 56% of Ukrainians said that the dissolution of the Soviet Union did more harm than good, with only 23% saying it did more good than harm. However, a similar poll conducted in 2016 by a Ukrainian group showed only 35% Ukrainians regretting the Soviet collapse and 50% not regretting it.

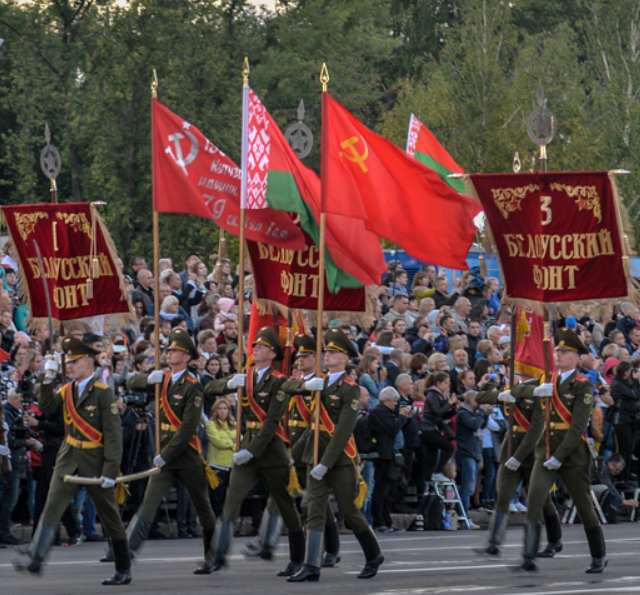
Belarusian Honor Guard carrying the national flags of Belarus and the Soviet Union, as well as the Soviet victory banner, during the Minsk Independence Day Parade, 2019.

The breakdown of economic ties that followed the Soviet collapse led to a severe economic crisis and catastrophic fall in the standard of living in post-Soviet states and the former Eastern Bloc, which was even worse than the Great Depression. An estimated seventeen million premature deaths took place in the former USSR after it collapsed, with around four million in Russia alone. Poverty, sex trafficking, and economic inequality surged between 1988 and 1989 and between 1993 and 1995, with the Gini ratio increasing by an average of 9 points for all former socialist countries. Even before the 1998 Russian financial crisis, the Russian GDP was half of what it had been in the early 1990s. By 1999, around 191 million people in post-Soviet states and former Eastern Bloc countries were living on less than $5.50 a day. It has been posited by several scholars that the dissolution of the Soviet Union and the end of communism as a global force in the post-Cold War era allowed neoliberal capitalism to become the dominant global system, which has resulted in rising economic inequality.

In the Kitchen Debate of 1959, Nikita Khrushchev claimed that then US Vice-president Richard Nixon's grandchildren would live "under communism", and Nixon claimed that Khrushchev's grandchildren would live "under freedom". In a 1992 interview, Nixon commented that during the debate, he was sure Khrushchev's claim was wrong, but Nixon was not sure that his own assertion was correct. Nixon said that events had proved that he was indeed right because Khrushchev's grandchildren now lived "in freedom" in reference to the recent end of the Soviet Union. Khrushchev's son Sergei Khrushchev became a naturalized American citizen, although his children remained in Moscow; whereas Nixon's grandchildren including Christopher Nixon Cox and Jennie Eisenhower live as their parents did in the United States.

=== United Nations membership ===
In a letter dated 24 December 1991, Boris Yeltsin, the Russian president, informed the United Nations Secretary-General that the membership of the Soviet Union in the Security Council and all other UN organs would be continued by the Russian Federation with the support of the 11 member countries of the Commonwealth of Independent States.

However, the Byelorussian Soviet Socialist Republic and the Ukrainian Soviet Socialist Republic had already joined the UN as original members on 24 October 1945, together with the Soviet Union. After declaring independence, the Ukrainian Soviet Socialist Republic changed its name to Ukraine on 24 August 1991, and on 19 September 1991, the Byelorussian Soviet Socialist Republic informed the UN that it had changed its name to the Republic of Belarus.

All of the twelve other independent states that were established from the former Soviet republics were admitted to the UN:

- 17 September 1991: Estonia, Latvia, and Lithuania
- 2 March 1992: Armenia, Azerbaijan, Kazakhstan, Kyrgyzstan, Moldova, Tajikistan, Turkmenistan, and Uzbekistan
- 31 July 1992: Georgia

== Historiographic explanations ==
The end of the Soviet Union caught many people by surprise. After the marginalisation of the notion of the withering of the state but before 1991, many thought that Soviet Union collapse was impossible or unlikely.

Historiography on the Soviet collapse can be roughly classified in two groups: intentionalist accounts and structuralist accounts.

Intentionalist accounts contend that Soviet collapse was not inevitable and resulted from the policies and decisions of specific individuals, usually Gorbachev and Yeltsin. Historian Archie Brown argues that Gorbachev was the main force in Soviet politics at least from 1985 to 1988 and even later and that he largely spearheaded the political reforms and developments, as opposed to being led by events. That was especially true of the policies of perestroika and glasnost, market initiatives, and foreign policy stance, as the political scientist George Breslauer has seconded by labelling Gorbachev a "man of the events". In a slightly different vein, David Kotz and Fred Weir have contended that Soviet elites were responsible for spurring on both nationalism and capitalism from which they could personally benefit, which is demonstrated also by their continued presence in the higher economic and political echelons of post-Soviet republics.

In contrast, structuralist accounts take a more deterministic view in which Soviet dissolution was an outcome of deeply rooted structural issues, which planted a time bomb. For example, Edward Walker has argued that minority nationalities were denied power at the Union level, confronted by a culturally destabilizing form of economic modernization, and subjected to a certain amount of Russification, but they were at the same time strengthened by several policies pursued by the Soviet government (indigenization of leadership, support for local languages, etc.). Over time, they created conscious nations. Furthermore, the basic legitimating myth of the Soviet federative system (that it was a voluntary and mutual union of allied peoples) eased the task of secession and independence. On 25 January 2016, Russian president Vladimir Putin supported that view by calling Lenin's support of the right of secession for the Soviet republics a "delayed-action bomb".

An opinion piece by Gorbachev in The Japan Times in April 2006 stated: "The nuclear meltdown at Chernobyl 20 years ago this month, even more than my launch of perestroika, was perhaps the real cause of the collapse of the Soviet Union."

It also had a profound impact on the policy-making circles of the Chinese Communist Party (CCP), in particular on CCP general secretary Xi Jinping, who states:

Why did the Soviet Union disintegrate? Why did the Communist Party of the Soviet Union fall from power? An important reason was that the struggle in the field of ideology was extremely intense, completely negating the history of the Soviet Union, negating the history of the Communist Party of the Soviet Union, negating Lenin, negating Stalin, creating historical nihilism and confused thinking. Party organs at all levels had lost their functions, the military was no longer under Party leadership. In the end, the Communist Party of the Soviet Union, a great party, was scattered, the Soviet Union, a great socialist country, disintegrated. This is a cautionary tale!

According to political scientists Steven Levitsky and Lucan Way in their book In Revolution and Dictatorship: The Violent Origins of Durable Authoritarianism (2022), the cohesion of the Communist Party of the Soviet Union (CPSU) leadership had declined by the 1980s. Most party leaders were born after the Soviet Union's origins during the Russian Civil War, and memories of the Eastern Front during World War II were fading.

== See also ==
- 1980s oil glut
- American decline
- Breakup of Yugoslavia
- Collapse: How Ukrainians Destroyed the Evil Empire (2021 documentary miniseries)
- Dissolution of Czechoslovakia
- Dissolution of the Russian Empire
- German reunification
- History of the Soviet Union (1982–1991)
- History of the Russian Federation
- Predictions of the collapse of the Soviet Union
- Post-Soviet studies
- Russian money in London
- Separatism in Russia
- Strong dollar policy
- Superpower collapse
- Yemeni reunification
- Fall of the Derg regime
- The Commanding Heights (book)
- The wild nineties
