= Hromada (disambiguation) =

Hromada is a basic unit of administrative division in Ukraine.

Hromada may refer to:

- Amalgamated hromada, the preceding administrative unit to the hromada
- Hromada (political party), a political party in Ukraine
- Hromada (secret society), a society of the intelligentsia of Ukraine
- Hromada, a political magazine published by Mykhailo Drahomanov 1878–1882

== See also ==
- Hramada, cognate term in Belarus
- Hramada (disambiguation)
- Gromada, cognate term in Poland
- Gromada (disambiguation)
