= Hramada (disambiguation) =

Hramada is a rural serttlement in Belarus.

Hramada, literally meaning "assembly" may also refer to several parties in Belarus:

- Belarusian Socialist Assembly
- Belarusian Social Democratic Assembly
- Belarusian Peasants' and Workers' Union
- Belarusian Social Democratic Party (Hramada)
- Belarusian Social Democratic Party (People's Hramada)
