= Hramada =

Coordinates: 53.3701352897891°N 30.4865605328103°E

Hramada (Belarusian: Грамада́, Russian: Громада) is a rural settlement in the Abidovichy rural council, Bykhaw district, Mogilev region, Belarus.

As of 2021, the settlement is in the "residential zone with periodic radiation monitoring" - an area with soil contamination due to Chernobyl disaster. Nearly all Bykhaw district is in this zone.
