= List of leaders of Georgia (country) =

This is the list of leaders of Georgia since 1918, during the periods of the short-lived Democratic Republic of Georgia (1918–1921), Soviet Georgia (1921–1990), and current Georgia. For the head of government, see President of Georgia.

== List (1918–present) ==
=== Transcaucasian Democratic Federative Republic (1918) ===
No.	Picture	Name (Birth–Death)	Began office	Left office	Party	Title(s)
1		Nikolay Chkheidze (1864–1926)	10 February 1918	26 May 1918	Social Democratic Party of Georgia	President of Parliamentary Assemblies

=== Democratic Republic of Georgia (1918–1921) ===
No.	Picture	Name (Birth–Death)	Began office	Left office	Party	Title(s)
1		Nikolay Chkheidze (1864–1926)	26 May 1918	16 March 1921	Social Democratic Party of Georgia	President of Parliamentary Assemblies (Parliamentary system : no President of the Republic)
1		Noe Ramishvili (1881–1930)	26 May 1918	24 June 1918	Social Democratic Party of Georgia	President of Government (Parliamentary system : no President of the Republic)
1		Noe Zhordania (1868–1953)	24 June 1918	18 March 1921	Social Democratic Party of Georgia	President of Government (Parliamentary system : no President of the Republic)

=== Transcaucasian Socialist Federative Soviet Republic (1922–1936) and Georgian Soviet Socialist Republic (1936–1990) ===
==== First Secretary of the Communist Party of Georgia ====
No.	Picture	Name (Birth–Death)	Began office	Left office	Party	Title(s)
1		Mamia Orakhelashvili (1881–1937)	16 March 1921	April 1922	Communist Party of Georgia	First secretaries of the Communist Party of Georgia
2		Mikheil Okudzhava	24 May 1922	22 October 1922	Communist Party of Georgia	First secretaries of the Communist Party of Georgia
3		Vissarion Lominadze (1897–1935)	22 October 1922	August 1924	Communist Party of Georgia	First secretaries of the Communist Party of Georgia
4		Mikheil Kakhiani (1896–1937)	August 1924	May 1930	Communist Party of Georgia	First secretaries of the Communist Party of Georgia
5		Levan Gogoberidze (1896–1937)	May 1930	19 November 1930	Communist Party of Georgia	First secretaries of the Communist Party of Georgia
6		Samson Mamulia (1892–1937)	19 November 1930	11 September 1931	Communist Party of Georgia	First secretaries of the Communist Party of Georgia
7		Lavrenty Kartvelishvili (1890–1938)	11 September 1931	14 November 1931	Communist Party of Georgia	First secretaries of the Communist Party of Georgia
8		Lavrentiy Beria (1899–1953)	14 November 1931	18 October 1932	Communist Party of Georgia	First secretaries of the Communist Party of Georgia
9		Petre Agniashvili	18 October 1932	15 January 1934	Communist Party of Georgia	First secretaries of the Communist Party of Georgia
10		Lavrentiy Beria (1899–1953)	15 January 1934	31 August 1938	Communist Party of Georgia	First secretaries of the Communist Party of Georgia
11		Candide Charkviani (1907–1994)	31 August 1938	2 April 1952	Communist Party of Georgia	First secretaries of the Communist Party of Georgia
12		Akaki Mgeladze (1910–1980)	2 April 1952	14 April 1953	Communist Party of Georgia	First secretaries of the Communist Party of Georgia
13		Aleksandre Mirtskhulava (1911–2009)	14 April 1953	19 September 1953	Communist Party of Georgia	First secretaries of the Communist Party of Georgia
14		Vasil Mzhavanadze (1902–1988)	20 September 1953	29 September 1972	Communist Party of Georgia	First secretaries of the Communist Party of Georgia
15		Eduard Shevardnadze (1928–2014)	29 September 1972	6 July 1985	Communist Party of Georgia	First secretaries of the Communist Party of Georgia
16		Jumber Patiashvili (born 1940)	6 July 1985	14 April 1989	Communist Party of Georgia	First secretaries of the Communist Party of Georgia
17		Givi Gumbaridze (born 1945)	14 April 1989	15 November 1990	Communist Party of Georgia	First secretaries of the Communist Party of Georgia

=== Georgia (1990–present) ===
as the Georgian SSR and after independence, parliamentary in 1990-1991, semi-presidential in 1991-1995, presidential in 1995-2004, semi-presidential in 2004-2005 and presidential 2005-2011. Semi-presidential in 2011-2019 and parliamentary since 2019.

==== Chairman of the Supreme Council of the Republic of Georgia (1990–1991) ====
No.	Name (Born–Died)	Picture	Term	Time in office	Took office	Left office	Party	Government
Parliamentary system (1990–1991)
1	Zviad Gamsakhurdia (1939–1993)		1	150 days	15 November 1990	14 April 1991	Round Table—Free Georgia	

==== Presidents and Prime Ministers (1991–present) ====
No.	Name (Born–Died)	Picture	Term	Time in office	Took office	Left office	Party	Government
Semi-presidential system (1991–1995)
1	Zviad Gamsakhurdia (1939–1993)		1	267 days	14 April 1991 (Appointed); 26 May 1991 (Inaugurated)	6 January 1992 (Deposed)	Round Table—Free Georgia	
—	Jaba Ioseliani (1926–2003)			64 days	6 January 1992	10 March 1992	Military	Military Council
—	Tengiz Kitovani (1938–2023)			64 days	6 January 1992	10 March 1992	Military	Military Council
—	Eduard Shevardnadze (1928–2014)			239 days	10 March 1992	4 November 1992	Independent	State Council
—	Eduard Shevardnadze (1928–2014)			2 days	4 November 1992	6 November 1992	Independent	State Council
—	Eduard Shevardnadze (1928–2014)			3 years, 20 days	6 November 1992	26 November 1995	Independent	State Council
Presidential system (1995–2004)
2	Eduard Shevardnadze (1928–2014)		1	5 years	26 November 1995 (Inaugurated)	30 April 2000	Union of Citizens of Georgia	
2	Eduard Shevardnadze (1928–2014)		2	5 years	30 April 2000 (Inaugurated)	23 November 2003 (Forced to Resign)	Union of Citizens of Georgia	
—	Nino Burjanadze (born 1964) (acting)			63 days	23 November 2003	25 January 2004	United National Movement	
Semi-presidential system (2004–2005)
Presidential system (2005–2011)
3	Mikheil Saakashvili (born 1967)		1	3 years, 304 days	25 January 2004 (Inaugurated)	25 November 2007 (Resigned)	United National Movement	
—	Nino Burjanadze (born 1964) (acting)			56 days	25 November 2007	20 January 2008	United National Movement	
(3)	Mikheil Saakashvili (born 1967)		2	5 years, 301 days	20 January 2008 (Inaugurated)	17 November 2013	United National Movement	
Semi-presidential system (2011–2019)
(3)	Mikheil Saakashvili (born 1967)		2	5 years, 301 days	20 January 2008 (Inaugurated)	17 November 2013	United National Movement	
10	Bidzina Ivanishvili (born 1956)		1	25 October 2012	20 November 2013	1 year, 26 days	Georgian Dream	Ivanishvili
11	Irakli Garibashvili (born 1982)		-	20 November 2013	30 December 2015	2 years, 40 days	Georgian Dream	Garibashvili I
12	Giorgi Kvirikashvili (born 1967)		1	30 December 2015	13 June 2018	2 years, 165 days	Georgian Dream	Kvirikashvili I–II
13	Mamuka Bakhtadze (born 1982)		-	20 June 2018	2 September 2019	1 year, 74 days	Georgian Dream	Bakhtadze
Parliamentary system (2019–present)
14	Giorgi Gakharia (born 1975)		1	8 September 2019	18 February 2021	1 year, 167 days	Georgian Dream	Gakharia I–II
–	Maya Tskitishvili (born 1974)		–	18 February 2021	22 February 2021	4 days	Georgian Dream	Gakharia II
15	Irakli Garibashvili (born 1982)		2	22 February 2021	29 January 2024	5 years, 110 days	Georgian Dream	Garibashvili II
16	Irakli Kobakhidze (born 1978)		1	8 February 2024	Incumbent	2 years, 124 days	Georgian Dream	Kobakhidze

== See also ==
- President of Georgia
- Prime Minister of Georgia
