= Besarion Jughashvili =

Father of Joseph Stalin (before 1847 – 1909)

- ბესარიონ ჯუღაშვილი (Georgian); Виссарион Джугашвили (Russian)
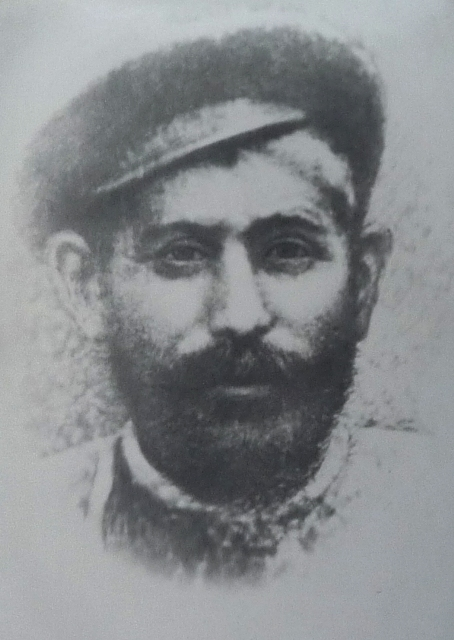
- Unconfirmed photo from Jughashvili's grave
- Born: Besarion Ivanes dze Jughashvili c. 1847; Didi Lilo, Tiflis Governorate, Russian Empire
- Died: 25 August 1909 (aged 62); Tbilisi, Russian Empire
- Other name: Beso
- Occupation: Shoemaker
- Spouse: Ekaterine Geladze
- Children: 3, including Ioseb
- Parent: Vano Jughashvili (father)

Besarion Ivanes dze Jughashvili (Note: Georgian: ბესარიონ ივანეს ძე ჯუღაშვილი. This is the name that appears in the birth register entry for his son, Ioseb. The Russian version of his name was Виссарион Иванович Джугашвили, Vissarion Ivanovich Dzhugashvili.) (c. 1850 – 25 August 1909) was the father of Joseph Stalin.

Born into a peasant family of serfs in Didi Lilo in Georgia, he moved to Tbilisi at a young age to be a shoemaker, working in a factory. He was invited to set up his own shop in Gori, where he met and married Ekaterine Geladze, with whom he had three sons; only the youngest, Ioseb, lived. Once known as a "clever and proud" man, Jughashvili's shop failed and he developed a serious drinking problem, wherefore he left his family and moved back to Tbilisi in 1884, working in a factory again. He had little contact with either his wife or son after that point, and little is known of his life from then on, except that he died in 1909 of cirrhosis.

== Family background and early life ==
Little is known of the family of Besarion Jughashvili. His grandfather, Zaza Jughashvili (born c. 1780), was involved in the 1804 Mtiuleti rebellion against the Russian Empire, which had only annexed eastern Georgia (Kartli-Kakheti) in 1801. Zaza was possibly of Ossetian background, with historians Simon Sebag Montefiore and Ronald Grigor Suny both suggesting he came from the village of Geri, in modern South Ossetia, though this claim can not be proven. (Note: Stephen Kotkin writes that Zaza "may have lived in a trial Ossetian village," but did not specify a name (Kotkin 2014, p. 25). Even so, it would not have a major impact: Robert Service explains that "the peoples of the Caucasus had moved around the region for centuries," while also notes that the claim was made to explain Stalin's later actions, "since the mountain peoples are widely regarded as less civilized than town dwellers of the valleys" (Service 2005, p. 18). Furthermore, Donald Rayfield has stated that "Stalin's possibly Osetic blood is no more significant to Georgian or Russian history than Henry Tudor's Welshness is to English history," which is to say, not at all (Rayfield 2004, p. 473, note 2).) Zaza escaped the uprising and moved to Didi Lilo, a village about 16 kilometres (9.9 mi) away from the capital, Tiflis (now Tbilisi). He worked as a serf for Prince Badur Machabeli, tending to his vineyards. There he had a son, Vano, who in turn had two sons: Giorgi, and Besarion, who was likely born around 1850. Vano died young, likely before he turned 50, while Giorgi worked as an innkeeper until he was killed by bandits.

With no family left Jughashvili moved to Tiflis and worked in the G.G. Adelkhanov shoe factory. Though he had no formal education, Jughashvili was literate, unusual for Georgian workers at the time, and was multilingual: it is likely in Tiflis that he learned Armenian, Azerbaijani, and Russian, in addition to his native Georgian. Around 1870 he was invited to move to Gori, about 75 kilometres (47 mi) from Tiflis, and make shoes for the Russian soldiers garrisoned there. Gori was a small town at the time, with roughly 7000 residents; the majority were Armenian, with a large number of Georgians, as well as small numbers of Russians, Abkhaz, and Ossetians. It grew in importance in 1871 when a branch of the Transcaucasus Railway connected the town to Tiflis and Poti, a major port for oil export.

== Life in Gori ==
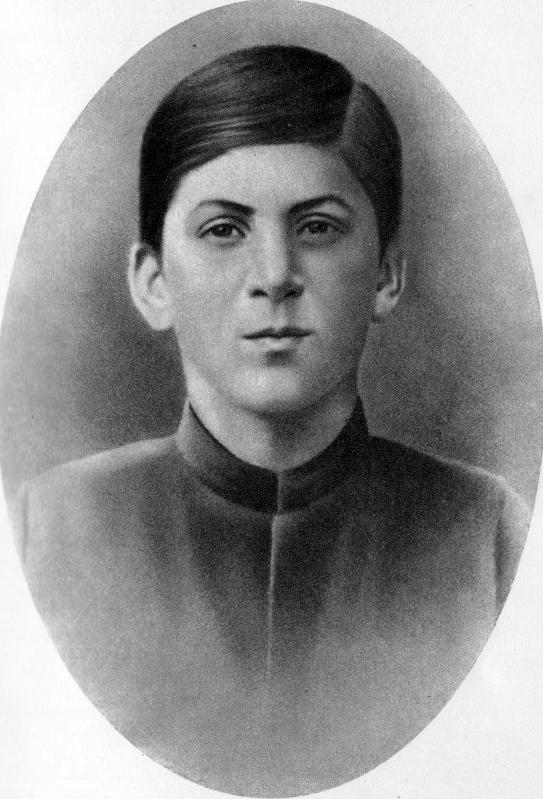
Ioseb, Jughashvili's third son, and the only one who survived childhood, pictured in 1894. He would grow up and take the name Stalin.

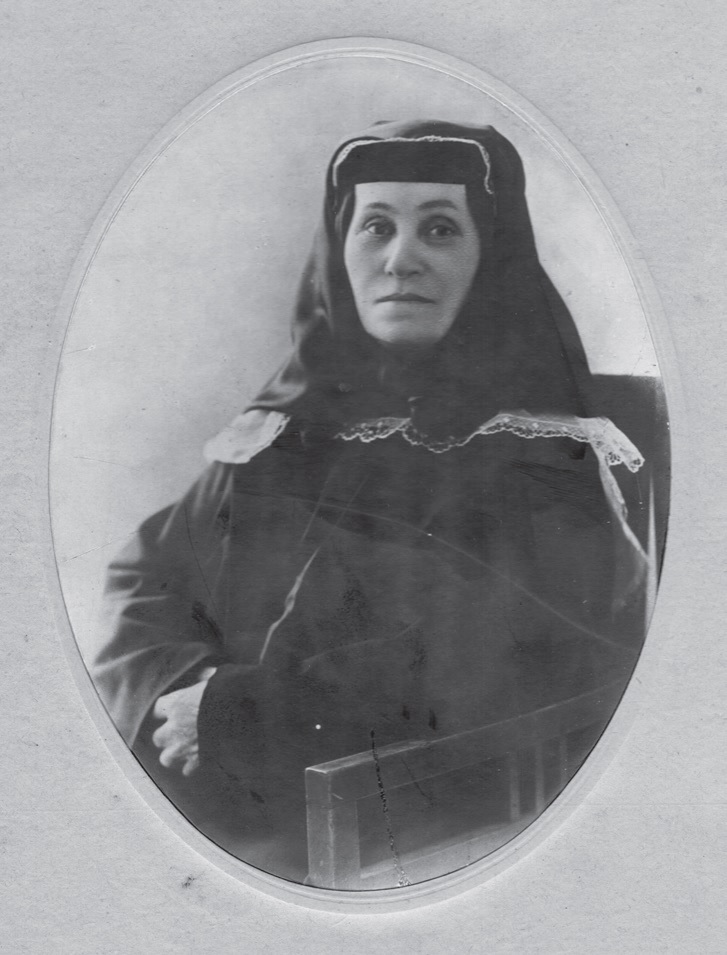
Keke Geladze, Jughashvili's wife, pictured in 1892.

Jughashvili set up a shop in the Russian Quarter of Gori, close to the barracks. In 1872 or 1874 he married Ekaterine (Keke) Geladze, a peasant girl who was probably 16. (Note: Montefiore and Rayfield state the wedding took place in 1872 (see Montefiore 2007, p. 17 and Rayfield 2004, p. 5), while Kotkin and Suny states it was in 1874, specifically 17 May. Kotin also points out that Montefiore's timeline doesn't work, as Montefiore states that "just over nine months after the wedding, on 14 February 1875" (see Kotkin 2014, p. 742, note 21 and Suny 2020, p. 19).) Keke, "an attractive freckled girl with auburn hair," was from the village of Gambareuli near Gori, and had moved to the town at a young age after her father died. They had three children, all boys, though the first two, Mikheil (born 14 February 1875) and Giorgi (born 24 December 1876), died aged two months and six months, respectively. Their third and final son, Ioseb, was born on 6 December 1878. (Note: Ioseb would later change his name to Joseph Stalin.)

Suny writes that after the death of Mikheil, Jughashvili started to drink heavily, which only increased after the death of Giorgi, and that the marriage began to deteriorate. Kotkin has also suggested that rumours of infidelity by Keke took a toll on him, especially after the birth of Ioseb, with several men suggested as his possible father. However, Kotkin concedes that "whether Keke was flirtatious, let alone promiscuous, is unclear," and that "reliable evidence about the possible liaisons of the future Stalin's mother is lacking," and argues that Jughashvili was probably the father.

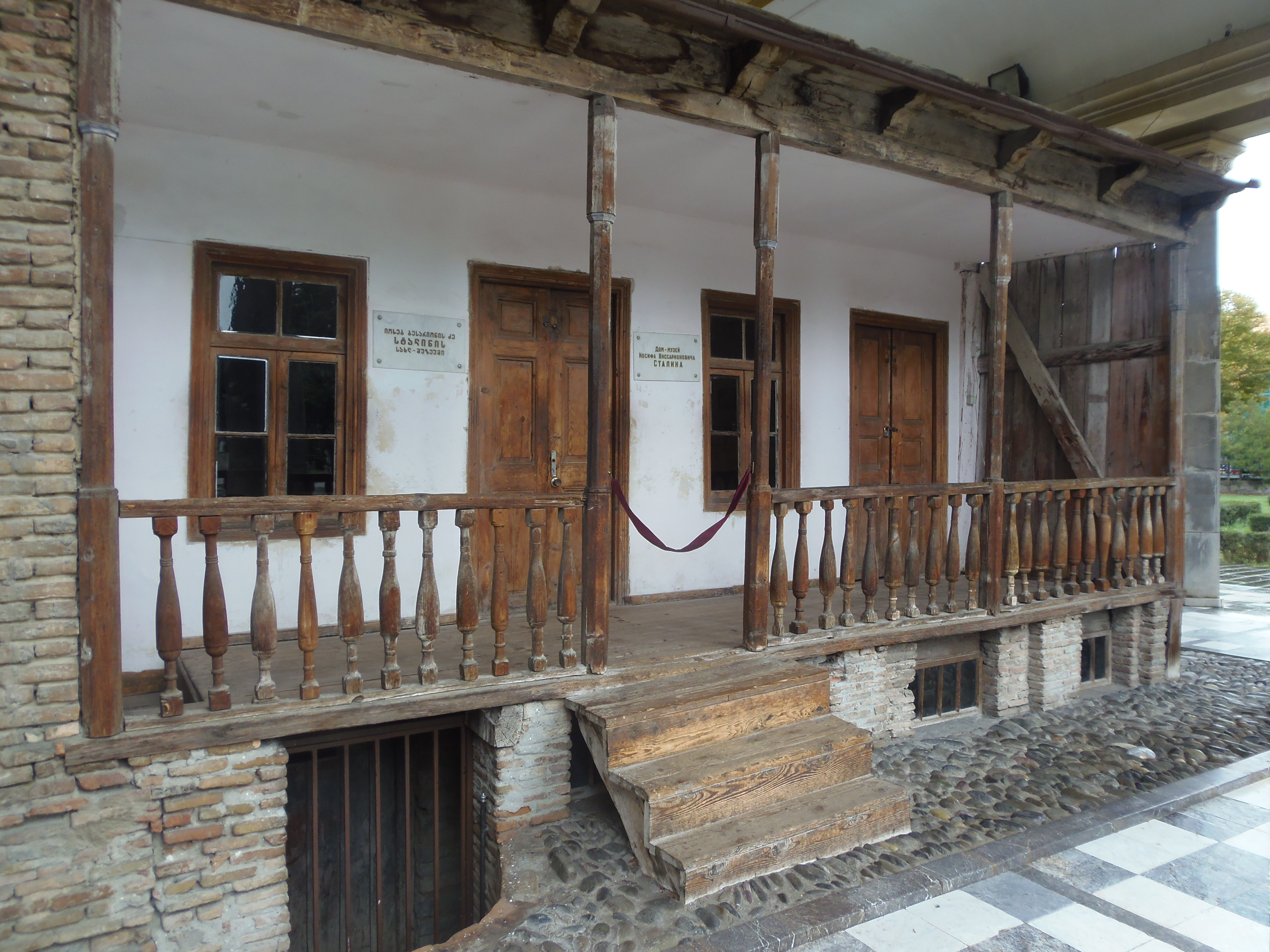
The Jughashvili home in Gori, as seen in 2016. The family lived in one room on the left, while Jughashvili's shop was set up in the basement. The building is now part of a museum dedicated to Stalin.

Jughashvili's shop was initially quite successful, employing up to ten people as well as apprentices, and the family initially enjoyed a rather high standard of living; a former apprentice would later note that he frequently saw butter in their home, which was an expensive delicacy for most Georgians (however Kotkin writes that the family lived more modestly, eating more traditional foods like lobio, lavash, and badrijani nigvzit). However, Jughashvili's drinking, exacerbated by a Georgian custom that business be paid in part with wine rather than money, had adverse effects on his business and home life. Isaac Deutscher felt that Jughashvili's inability to lift his status, "to be his own master," likely contributed to his drinking and frustrations. This idea is echoed by Robert Service, who noted that Jughashvili did not adapt to make European-style shoes that were popular at the time, and instead kept producing traditional Georgian styles, and suggests that the rumours about Keke were also a major influence on his drinking. Frequently drunk, Jughashvili became violent and routinely would beat Keke (who often hit back) and Iosef, and frequently fought in public, earning the nickname "Crazy Beso." Jughashvili's business suffered from his drinking, and he was eventually forced to give it up. The family also lost their home, and began staying with others for short periods, with nine different addresses over a ten-year period.

== Later life and death ==
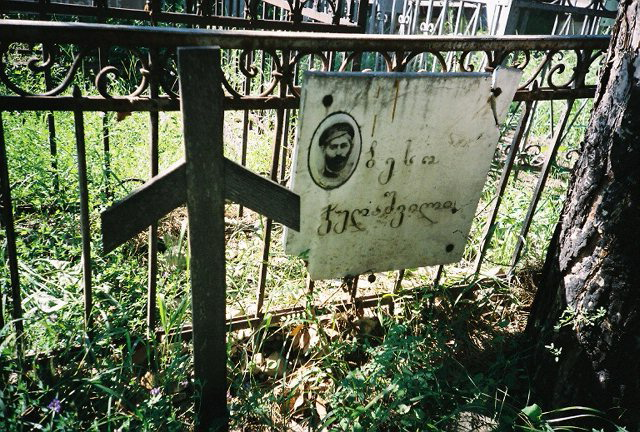
Jughashvili's grave in Telavi, Georgia. Originally buried in a common grave, what was thought to be his grave was identified in 1972.

In 1884, Jughashvili left the family and moved to Tiflis. (Note: Montefiore (Montefiore 2007, p. 29) states that Jughashvili left after Ioseb contracted smallpox, though Kotin (Kotkin 2014, p. 20) suggests the events were unrelated, and implies Jughashvili left before the smallpox outbreak, and that he was told to leave by the Gori police chief after attacking him.) He returned to his old job at the Adelkhanov factory. He sent some money to Keke, as well as offers to reconcile, but all efforts to do so failed.

Jughashvili was upset when he learned that Keke had enrolled Ioseb in school, instead hoping his son would follow his path and become a cobbler. This led to a major incident in January 1890. Ioseb had been struck by a phaeton, severely injuring him. Jughashvili returned to Gori and brought his son to a Tiflis hospital, and after Ioseb healed he was apprenticed to the Adelkhanov factory. Keke was adamantly opposed to the idea and used her connections with the church to bring Ioseb back to Gori, where he would continue his studies to become a priest. This marked the last real contact Jughasvhili had with his wife or son, as he cut off contact and financial support when Ioseb left Tiflis.

Soon after Ioseb left Tiflis, Jughashvili seems to have left the Adelkhanov factory. He briefly made shoes in a stall at the Armenian bazaar in Tiflis, and his actions after that are uncertain. He did keep in contact with Ioseb, occasionally sending him hand-made shoes. Jughashvili also had one final role in Ioseb's life: in January 1900, Ioseb was arrested for the first time on account of Jughashvili. When Jughashvili left Didi Lilo, he was not removed from the village roles, and still owed taxes as a peasant from the region. It is not clear why Ioseb was arrested instead of his father, who still lived in Tiflis, but Kotkin suggests it was a police tactic to send a message to Ioseb, who had begun his revolutionary activities.

In August 1909, Jughashvili went to the Mikhailovsky Hospital in Tiflis, suffering from tuberculosis, colitis and pneumonia. He died on 12 August 1909, with the cause of death listed as cirrhosis of the liver. Only one person, a fellow cobbler, attended his funeral, and he was buried in an unmarked grave in Telavi. The location of his grave was unknown until 1972, when Kandid Charkviani, the former First Secretary of the Georgian Communist Party, led efforts to find it and mark it, though it was not confirmed if Jughashvili's remains were still there. Charkviani had previously looked for photos of Jughashvili, at one point bringing several to Stalin to confirm their authenticity; after looking at them Stalin was unable to confirm if any were his father. There is only one photo purportedly of Jughasvhili, though its authenticity has never been confirmed.

== Bibliography ==
- Charkviani, Kandid (2015), Gela Charkviani (ed.), სტალინთან ურთიერთობის ეპიზოდები (Episodes of a Relationship with Stalin) (in Georgian), Tbilisi: Artanuji, ISBN 978-9-94144-590-3
- Deutscher, Isaac (1966), Stalin: A Political Biography (Second ed.), New York City: Oxford University Press, ISBN 978-0-14013-504-6
- Kotkin, Stephen (2014), Stalin, Volume I: Paradoxes of Power, 1878–1928, New York City: Penguin Press, ISBN 978-1-59420-379-4
- Montefiore, Simon Sebag (2007), Young Stalin, London: Phoenix, ISBN 978-0-297-85068-7
- Rayfield, Donald (2004), Stalin and His Hangmen: The Tyrant and Those Who Killed for Him, New York City: Random House, ISBN 0-375-50632-2
- Service, Robert (2005), Stalin: A Biography, Cambridge, Massachusetts: Belknap Press of Harvard University, ISBN 0-674-01697-1
- Stalin, J.V (1952), "Anarchism or Socialism?", Stalin, Works: Volume 1, 1901–1907, Moscow: Foreign Language Publishing House, pp. 297–372, OCLC 1122545002
- Suny, Ronald Grigor (2020), Stalin: Passage to Revolution, Princeton, New Jersey: Princeton University Press, ISBN 978-0-691-18203-2

=== Further reading ===
- Simashvili, Tengiz (July–September 2020), "Fake Grave of Stalin's Father and Modernity: Materials for Biography of Joseph Stalin", Electronic Research Journal of Social Sciences and Humanities, 2 (III): 23–37, ISSN 2706-8242
