= Zaza Jughashvili =

Paternal great-grandfather of Joseph Stalin

Zaza Dzhugashvili
- ზაზა ჯუღაშვილი
- Born: 1780
- Died: 1847 (aged 66–67)
- Other name: Zaza Dzhugashvili
- Occupation: Serf
- Years active: 1800–1847
- Employer(s): Prince Badur Machabeli, Eristavi princes
- Known for: being the great-grandfather of Joseph Stalin
- Father: Vissarion Jughashvili (1740–?)

Zaza Vissarionovich Jughashvili (Georgian: ზაზა ჯუღაშვილი, Russian: Заза Джугашвили; 1780–1847) was a Georgian serf in Geri, Georgia and the paternal great-grandfather of Joseph Stalin.

== Biography ==
Zaza was born sometime around 1780 possibly in Geri, but lived in the village of Ananuri and worked as a serf. Zaza was involved in the 1804 Mtiuleti rebellion against the Russian Empire and was imprisoned in Metekhi Castle on December 8, 1805. During his imprisonment, he escaped and fled to the Gori district where he worked as a serf for the Eristavi princes. During his employment under the Eristavi, he organized another peasant revolt and was forced to flee to Didi-Lilo. During his time in Didi-Lilo, he worked as a serf in a vineyard for Prince Machabeli and married an unknown woman and had a child Vano Zazovich Jughashvili, who in turn had two sons: Giorgi, and Besarion Jughashvili who were both born around 1850, 3 years after Zaza's death.
