= Mamulia =

Mamulia is a Georgian surname. Notable people with the surname include:

- Guram Mamulia (1937–2003), Georgian historian, politician, and campaigner for Meskhetian rights
- Samson Mamulia (1892–1937), First Secretary of the Georgian Communist Party
