= Adjarian Regional Committee of the Communist Party of Georgia =

Position in the Adjar ASSR of the Georgian SSR of the Soviet Union

The First Secretary of the Adjar regional branch of the Communist Party of Georgia was the position of highest authority in the Adjar ASSR in the Georgian SSR of the Soviet Union. The position was created in 1921, and abolished in 1991. The First Secretary was a de facto appointed position usually by the Central Committee the Communist Party of Georgia or the First Secretary of the Republic.

== List of First Secretaries of the Communist Party of Adjaria ==
Name	Term of Office		Life years
Name	Start	End	Life years
First Secretaries of the Communist Party
Aleksandr Gambarov	1921	1921	1890–1937
K. Bardzenishvili	1921	1921	
Simon Takoyev	1921	1922	1876–1938
Nikolay Svanidze	1922	1924	1895–1937
Levan Gogoberidze	1924	1925	1896–1937
Nikolay Akirtava	April 1926	December 1926	1894–1937
Nikolay Pantskhava	December 1926	1929	?–1937
Samson Mamulia	1929	1930	1892–1937
Mikhail Gobechiya	1931	1932	?–1937
Artemy Geurkov	January 13, 1932	April 13, 1937	1901–1937
Iosif Kochlamazashvili	April 13, 1937	February 23, 1938	1906–?
Aleksey Sadzhaya	February 23, 1938	November 29, 1938	1898–1942
Aron Tapalshvili	1938	1938	
Mikhail Baramiya	1938	1940	1905–?
Georgy Tvalchrelidze	1940	1944	1896–1968
Kiril Bechvaya	1944	1951	1905–?
Davyd Khantadze	1951	July 12, 1952	1905–?
Grigory Tsintsabadze	July 12, 1952	May 1953	
Makary Dzhashi	May 1953	January 1954	1902–?
Davyd Mamuladze	January 1954	March 1961	1910–?
Aleksandr Tkhilaishvili	March 1961	January 1975	1914–?
Vakhtang Papunidze	January 1975	August 1986	1929–
Guram Emiridze	August 1986	March 1990	1937–
Tengiz Khakhva	March 1990	1991	1952–
Ilya Tsulukidze	May 1991	1991	

== See also ==
- Adjar Autonomous Soviet Socialist Republic

== Sources ==
- World Statesmen.org
