= Keke Geladze =

Mother of Joseph Stalin (1856/58-1937)

Ekaterine Geladze
- ეკატერინე გელაძე
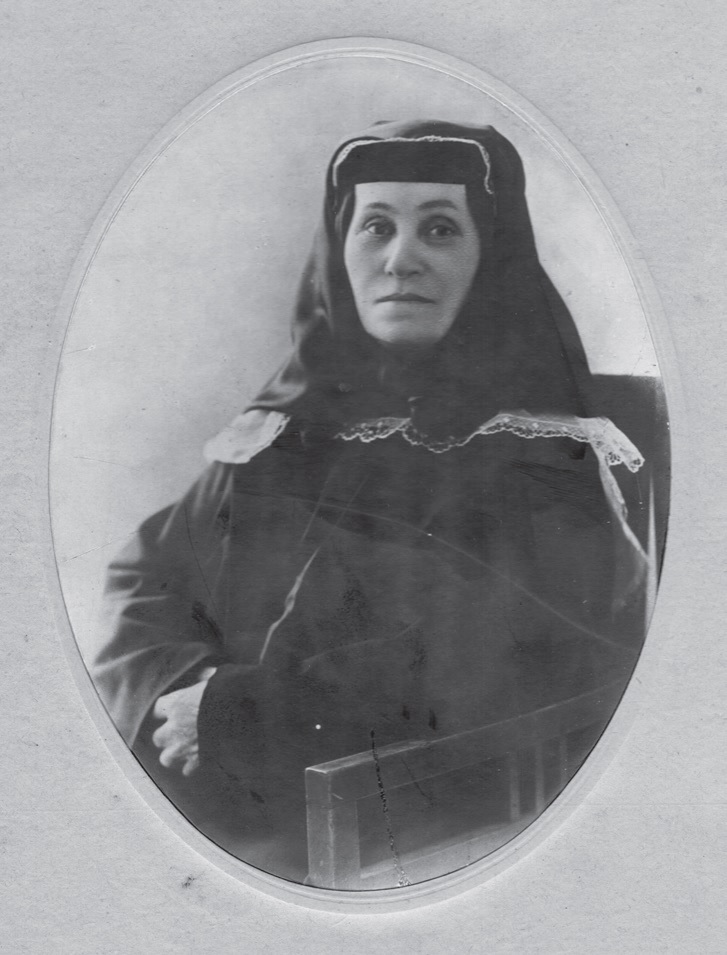
- Geladze in 1892
- Born: Ekaterine Giorgis asuli Geladze c. 1856/1858; Gori, Russian Empire
- Died: 4 June 1937 (aged 79-81); Tbilisi, Soviet Union
- Occupation: Seamstress
- Spouse: Besarion Jughashvili
- Children: 3, including Ioseb

Ekaterine Giorgis asuli Geladze (Note: Georgian: ეკატერინე გიორგის ასული გელაძე In Russian, her name was Екатерина Георгиевна Геладзе, Ekaterina Georgievna Geladze) (1856/1858 (Note: Soviet sources also gave her birth date as 1860. Kotkin suggests the discrepancy relates to her wedding, and an attempt to make Geladze appear older than she was. See Kotkin 2014, p. 742, note 21.) – 4 June 1937), commonly known as Keke, was the mother of Soviet leader Joseph Stalin.

Born into a family of peasants outside of Gori, in modern Georgia, she married Besarion Jughashvili, a cobbler, and had three sons; only the youngest, Ioseb, lived. Besarion left the family, leaving Geladze to raise her son. Deeply religious, she wanted Ioseb to become a priest, working as a seamstress in Gori to pay for his education. Geladze remained in Gori when Ioseb moved to the Tbilisi Spiritual Seminary, and stayed there until his rise to power in the Soviet Union as Joseph Stalin. In her old age Geladze lived in Tbilisi, the capital city of Georgia; while Stalin wrote to her, he rarely visited, with the last visit in 1935. She died in 1937, and was buried in the Mtatsminda Pantheon in Tbilisi.

== Early life ==
Geladze was born to a family of Georgian Orthodox Christian serfs in Gambareuli near Gori in either 1856 or 1858. Her father, Giorgi (or Glakha) Geladze, was either a bricklayer or potter, and was a serf belonging to Prince Ivane Amilakhvari. He died around the time of Geladze's birth, though her mother Melania ensured that Geladze learned to read and write, which was unusual for women at the time. She had two brothers: Giorgi (Gio) and Sandala. Melania died while Geladze was young, leaving the children to be raised by Melania's brother, who moved them into Gori around 1864, when serfs were emancipated in the Caucasus (they had been freed in Russia in 1861).

== Marriage and motherhood ==
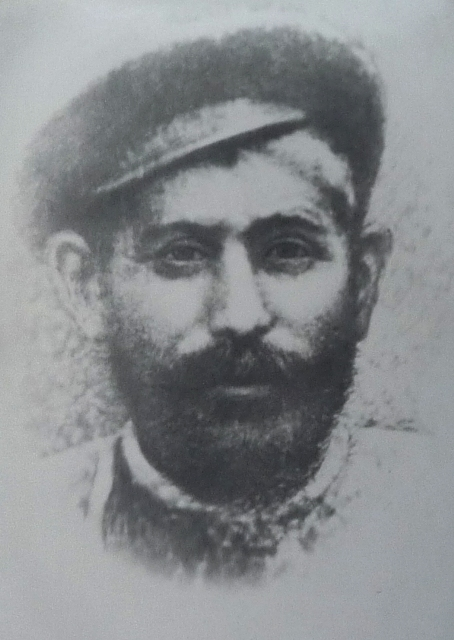
Unconfirmed photograph of Besarion Jughashvili, Keke's husband.

As a teenager, Geladze was apparently quite "an attractive freckled girl with auburn hair." Geladze would later brag that among her friends she "became the desired and beautiful girl." She was sought out by Besarion Jughashvili, a local cobbler, and the two married in either 1872 or 1874, when she was likely 16. (Note: Montefiore and Rayfield state the wedding took place in 1872 (see Montefiore 2007, p. 17 and Rayfield 2004, p. 5), while Kotkin and Suny states it was in 1874, specifically 17 May. Kotkin also points out that Montefiore's timeline doesn't work, as Montefiore states that "just over nine months after the wedding, on 14 February 1875" (see Kotkin 2014, p. 742, note 21 and Suny 2020, p. 19).) They had three children, all boys, though the first two, Mikheil (14–21 February 1875) and Giorgi (24 December 1876 – 19 June 1877), died aged one week and six months, respectively. Their third and final son, Ioseb, was born on 6 December 1878. (Note: Ioseb would later change his name to Joseph Stalin.) Prior to the birth of Ioseb, Geladze became intensely religious, promising to make a pilgrimage to a church in Geri if the child survived, a promise she and Jughashvili upheld.

Initially Jughashvili's shop was quite successful, employing up to ten people as well as apprentices, and the family initially enjoyed a rather high standard of living; a former apprentice would later note that he frequently saw butter in their home, which was an expensive delicacy for most Georgians (however Kotkin wrote that the family lived more modestly, eating more traditional foods like lobio, lavash, and badrijani nigvzit). However Jughashvili's drinking, exacerbated by a Georgian custom that business paid in part with wine rather than money, had adverse effects on his business and home life. Isaac Deutscher felt that Jughashvili's inability to lift his status, "to be his own master," likely contributed to his drinking and frustrations. This idea is echoed by Robert Service, who noted that Jughashvili did not adapt to make European-style shoes that were popular at the time, and instead kept producing traditional Georgian styles, and suggests that the rumours about Geladze were also a major influence on his drinking. Frequently drunk, Jughashvili became violent and routinely would beat Geladze (who often hit back) and Ioseb, and acted out in public, earning the nickname "Crazy Beso." Jughashvili's business suffered from his drinking, and he was eventually forced to give it up. The family also lost their home, and began staying with others for short periods, with nine different addresses over a ten-year period.

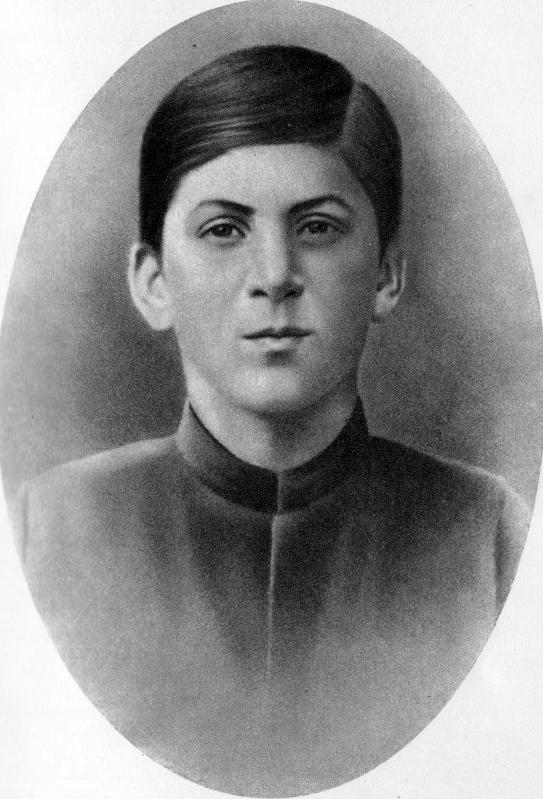
Ioseb Jughashvili, Jughashvili's third son, and the only one who survived childhood, pictured in 1894. He would grow up and take the name Joseph Stalin.

Jughashvili's drinking was likely exacerbated by rumours of Geladze flirting with married men in Gori: rumours linked her to several men, including Yakov Egnatashvili, who served as best man at the wedding and godfather to the first two children; Damian Davrishevi, a police officer; and Kristopore Charkviani, a priest. This also fed the idea that Ioseb was not the son of Jughashvili, but was instead fathered by one of the other men. However, there is no evidence to show either that Geladze was flirtatious, or even that the men came to her, and there has been no proof that Jughashvili was not Ioseb's father. (Note: Geladze was quoted as saying in later life that, "When I was young, I cleaned house for people and when I met a good-looking boy, I didn't waste the opportunity." However this was written in the memoirs of Lavrentiy Beria's son Sergo, and not reliable. See Kotkin 2014, p. 742, note 35.)

In 1884 Jughashvili left the family and moved to Tiflis, returning to his old job at the Adelkhanov factory. (Note: Montefiore (Montefiore 2007, p. 29) states that Jughashvili left after Ioseb contracted smallpox, though Kotkin (Kotkin 2014, p. 20) suggests the events were unrelated, and implies Jughashvili left before the smallpox outbreak, and that he was told to leave by the Gori police chief after attacking him.) He sent some money to Keke, as well as offers to reconcile, but all efforts to do so failed. To support herself and her son, Geladze took on any menial job available; mainly housework, sewing and laundering, including in the homes of Davrichewy and Egnatashvili. Living in near-poverty, they moved frequently, living in nine homes over the next decade. In 1886 they were able to move into the top story of Charkviani's house; historian Stephen Kotkin has suggested that this was a calculated move on Geladze's part, as she lobbied Charkviani to help enroll Ioseb into the church school that year, as well as teach him Russian. Around this time Geladze started working at a couture shop, and would remain there until she left Gori.

Jughashvili was upset when he learned that Keke had enrolled Ioseb in school, instead hoping his son would follow his path and become a cobbler. This led to a major incident in January, 1890. Ioseb had been struck by a phaeton, severely injuring him. Jughashvili returned to Gori and brought his son to a Tiflis hospital, and after Ioseb healed he was apprenticed to the Adelkhanov factory. Keke was adamantly opposed to the idea, and used her connections with the church to bring Ioseb back to Gori, where he would continue his studies to become a priest. This marked the last real contact Jughasvhili had with his wife or son, as he cut off contact and financial support when Ioseb left Tiflis. Geladze cleaned the school to help pay the tuition, though Ioseb soon gained a stipend due to his academic performance, and upon graduating in 1894 wrote entrance exams for the Tbilisi Spiritual Seminary, one of the top schools in the Caucasus at the time, and was admitted.

== Later life ==
While Ioseb moved to Tiflis, Geladze remained in Gori. Expelled from the seminary in 1899, Ioseb turned to revolutionary activity, eventually taking the name Joseph Stalin. He would visit Geladze in Gori one final time, in 1904 after escaping from exile in Siberia. She would not hear any further information about her son for more than 10 years, until his role in the Russian Revolution in 1917. In 1922 Geladze moved to Tiflis, at the insistence of the leadership of the Georgian Soviet Socialist Republic, as they felt the mother of one of the leading Bolsheviks should be taken care of. She was given a room in the palace of the former Viceroy of the Caucasus; the Council of People's Commissars of Georgia also used the palace. She was cared for by Lavrentiy Beria, the leader of Georgia and a close ally of Stalin, and frequently visited by his wife Nino. Dressed in black, signifying she was widowed, Geladze was frequently seen in the Tbilisi markets, closely guarded by the secret police, which were under Beria's control.

Stalin rarely visited his mother after coming to power: in a 1930 interview with H.R. Knickerbocker of the New York Evening Post she was quoted as saying Stalin had only visited her in 1921 and 1926, and that she had visited Moscow once, though it was reported she "didn't like it." They kept up via letter-writing, though that decreased after the suicide of Stalin's second wife Nadezhda Alliluyeva in 1932; only eighteen letters from Stalin were archived, while one from Geladze remains. Stalin's children visited in 1935, though both Vasily and Svetlana did not understand Georgian and needed their half-brother Yakov to translate (Geladze never learned Russian).

Hearing that his mother was ill, Stalin visited her for the final time on 17 October 1935. According to an unpublished memoir of Geladze's doctor, the two had a short discussion about Stalin's position: "Mama, do you remember our tsar? Well, I'm something like the tsar," to which Geladze replied "You'd have done better to become a priest." From the same source, it is reported that Stalin asked, "Why did you dream so much of me becoming a priest?", with Geladze saying "I saw how little they worked and how well they lived. They were also greatly respected. So I thought that there was no better occupation for a man, and I would have been proud that I was a priest's mother. But I confess, even about that I was wrong." Three days after Stalin's visit Geladze was interviewed by Pravda; the article appeared in the 23 October edition of the newspaper, with a follow-up article in the 27 October edition, detailing Stalin's visit. Though he was indifferent to the first article's publication, Stalin was not pleased with a second one about his mother being published.

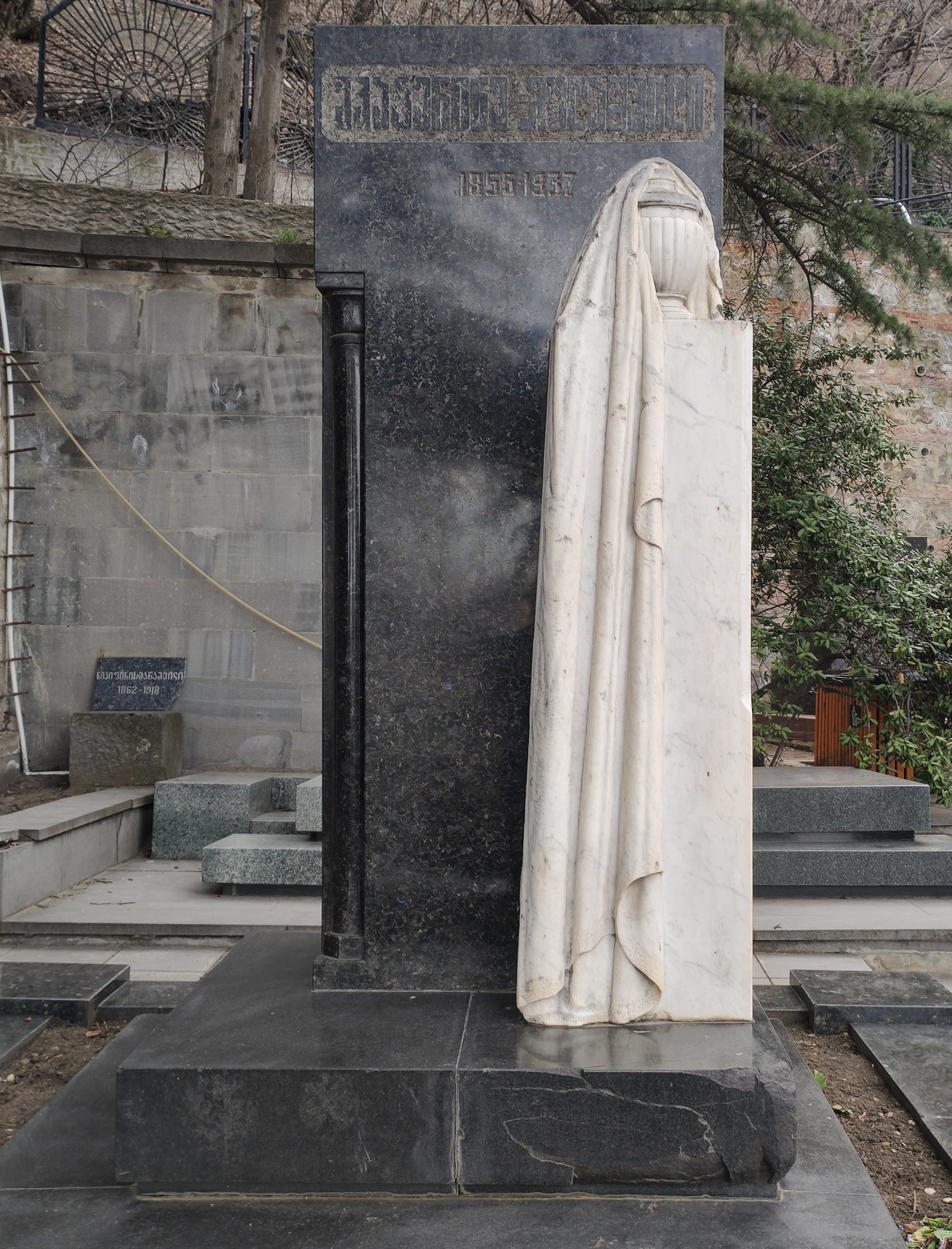
Grave of Ekaterine Geladze at the Mtatsminda Pantheon in Tbilisi, Georgia

Geladze died on 4 June 1937. The medical report listed the cause of death as heart failure. Occupied with the Great Purge of Communist officials and the Red Army, in particular the arrest and interrogation of Mikhail Tukhachevsky, Stalin did not attend the funeral; Beria was sent in his stead, with a wreath that had the message "To a dear and beloved mother, from your son Iosif Jughashvili (Stalin)" written in Georgian and Russian. Stalin had her buried in the Mtatsminda Pantheon overlooking Tbilisi, a necropolis full of prominent Georgian figures.

In the 21st century there was discussion about moving Geladze's body from Mtatsminda to her hometown of Gori, with the Deputy Mayor of Tbilisi stating in 2017 that "there is no place for Stalin’s mother in the Mtatsminda", but no action was taken, and Geladze's grave is one of the most popular spots for tourists in the Pantheon.
