= Gotcha Tchogovadzé =

Gotcha Tchogovadzé ლანა ღოღობერიძე

Ambassador of Georgia to France
- In office 20 November 1993 – 17 February 2004
- Succeeded by: Lana Gogoberidze

Personal details
- Born: 11 January 1941 (age 85) Kutaisi, Georgian SSR, Soviet Union
- Education: Tbilisi Polytechnic Institute (1963)

Gotcha Tchogovadzé (Georgian: გოჩა ჩოგოვაძე; born 11 January 1941) is a retired Georgian academic and diplomat, and former Ambassador of Georgia to France.

- In 1971, he organized the Polytechnic Institute and was a founding member of the MIS department, and was elected first chairman.
- In 1976 he was awarded the title of professor.
- In 1976 he became head of the chair of the sectoral research laboratory
- From 1981 to 1986 he worked in Paris, at UNESCO's Education Sector Informatics Department.
- From 1986 to 1988 he was leading in the Communist Party Central Committee's Department of Education and Science, for many years was a member of the Supreme Soviet of the Georgian Soviet Socialist Republic.
- From 1988 to 1994 he was Rector of the Polytechnic Institute.
- From 1994 to 2004 he was ambassador in Paris with coaccreditation in Madrid, accredited as permanent representative to UNESCO.
- Since 2004 he is employed at the UNESCO, the United Nations Educational, Scientific and Cultural Organization Mission.

== Publications ==
- 20 monographs, 6 of the invention and more than 100 scientific works.
