= First Secretary of the Georgian Communist Party =

De facto leader of the Georgian Soviet Socialist Republic

First Secretary of the Central Committee of the Communist Party of Georgian SSR
- საქართველოს სსრ კომუნისტური პარტიის ცკ პირველი მდივანი
- Emblem of the Georgian SSR
- Central Committee of the Communist Party of Georgia
- Style: Comrade Secretary (informal)
- Type: Party leader
- Status: Country leader
- Seat: Tbilisi, Georgian SSR
- Formation: March 1921; 105 years ago
- First holder: Mamia Orakhelashvili
- Final holder: Jemal Mikeladze
- Abolished: 1991; 35 years ago

The First Secretary of the Georgian Communist Party (Russian: Первый секретарь ЦК Компартии Грузии; Georgian: საქართველოს სსრ კომუნისტური პარტიის პირველი მდივანი) was the leading position in the Georgian Communist Party during the Soviet era. Its leaders were responsible for many of the affairs in Georgia and were considered the leader of the Georgian Soviet Socialist Republic. Many of its leaders were prominent outside of the country and were noted Soviet leaders, including Lavrentiy Beria and Eduard Shevardnadze.

== List of First Secretaries of the Georgian Communist Party ==
- Mamia Orakhelashvili (March 1921–April 1922)
- Mikheil Okujava (April–22 October 1922)
- Vissarion Lominadze (25 October 1922 – August 1924)
- Mikheil Kakhiani (August 1924–May 1930)
- Levan Gogoberidze (May–19 November 1930)
- Samson Mamulia (20 November 1930 – 11 September 1931)
- Lavrenty Kartvelishvili (11 September–14 November 1931)
- Lavrenti Beria (14 November 1931 – 18 October 1932) (1st time)
- Petre Agniashvili (18 October 1932 – 15 January 1934)
- Lavrentiy Beria (15 January 1934 – 31 August 1938) (2nd time)
- Candide Charkviani (31 August 1938 – 2 April 1952)
- Akaki Mgeladze (2 April 1952 – 14 April 1953)
- Aleksandre Mirtskhulava (14 April–19 September 1953)
- Vasil Mzhavanadze (20 September 1953 – 29 September 1972)
- Eduard Shevardnadze (29 September 1972 – 6 July 1985)
- Jumber Patiashvili (6 July 1985 – 14 April 1989)
- Givi Gumbaridze (14 April 1989 – 7 December 1990)
- Avtandil Margiani (7 December 1990 – 19 February 1991)
- Jemal Mikeladze (20 February – 26 August 1991)
