= Day Is Longer Than Night =

1984 film

- Directed by: Lana Gogoberidze
- Written by: Lana Gogoberidze; Zaira Arsenishvili
- Starring: Daredjan Kharshiladze
- Cinematography: Nugzar Erkomaishvili
- Music by: Giya Kancheli
- Release date: May 1984
- Running time: 138 minutes
- Country: Soviet Union
- Languages: Russian, Georgian

Day Is Longer Than Night (Georgian: დღეს ღამე უთენებია) is a 1984 Soviet drama film directed by Lana Gogoberidze. It was entered into the 1984 Cannes Film Festival.

== Plot ==
The film tells the story of a woman's difficult fate. For eighty years Eva spent her life in a Georgian mountain village. There she married Georgiy the shepherd, who soon died, possibly murdered. After this she married Spyridon out of compassion for his lonesome, gloomy lost soul. In her native village Eva lived through the Russian Revolution and Russian Civil War, the NEP and the collectivization.

And now Eva lives in a deserted village. Most of the villagers move to the city where living is simpler and easier and life is always seething. And even the mother of Eva's beloved grandson who has come from the city, wants to take him away with her. But the boy remains with his grandmother who believes that the village where their ancestors lived will be reborn.

== Cast ==
- Daredjan Kharshiladze as young Eva
- Tamara Skhirtladze as old Eva
- Guram Pirtskhalava as Spyridon, Eva's husband
- Irakli Khizanishvili as Archil, professional revolutionary
- Guram Palavandishvili as Georgiy the shepherd, Eva's husband
- Leo Pilpani as Eva's father
- Akaki Khidasheli as Mnate
- Guranda Gabunia as Daredzhan, Spyridon's daughter
- Sofiko Arsenishvili as Daredzhan in childhood
- Nika Khazaradze as Georgiy, Daredzhan's young son
- Grigol Talakvadze as Mito, fellow villager
- Natia Gogochuri as "puritan", prostitute
