= Otar Megvinetukhutsesi =

Soviet actor (1932–2013)

- ოთარ მეღვინეთუხუცესი
- Born: January 16, 1932; Tbilisi, Georgia
- Died: May 9, 2013 (aged 81); Tbilisi, Georgia
- Occupation: Actor
- Years active: 1958–2013
- Spouse: Guranda Gabunia

Otar Megvinetukhutsesi (Georgian: ოთარ მეღვინეთუხუცესი; 16 January 1932 – 9 May 2013) was a Georgian film and theatre actor. Honored Artist of the Georgian SSR (1964), People's Artist of the Georgian SSR (1973), People's Artist of the USSR (1979), Commander of the Order of Honour (2000). Winner of the Tokyo International Film Festival (1991) and the Georgian State Prize (1981, 2001). He graduated from the Shota Rustaveli Theater Institute in 1954. He played more than 35 roles during his career including a memorable role in the 1978 film Data Tutashkhia. Megvinetukhutsesi was married to the Georgian actress Guranda Gabunia (1938–2019). He died at the age of 81 in Tbilisi in 2013. He was buried at the Didube Pantheon in Tbilisi. The monument of the Otar Megvinetukhutsesi was opened in the "April 9 Square" in Tbilisi, in 2015.

== Filmography ==
- Fatima (ფატიმა, 1958) as Jambulati
- good people (კეთილი ადამიანები, 1961) as Giga
- Under One Sky (ერთი ცის ქვეშ, 1961) as Bondo
- Who will saddle the horse (ვინ შეკაზმავს ცხენს, 1965) as Gvadi
- The Plea (ვედრება, 1967) as Jokola
- Tariel Golua (ტარიელ გოლუა, 1968) as Gaiozi
- The Right Hand of the Grand Master (დიდოსტატის მარჯვენა, 1970) as King Giorgi
- Tsotne Dadiani (ცოტნე დადიანი, 1971) as Tsotne Dadiani
- A Necklace for My Beloved (სამკაული ჩემი სატრფოსათვის, 1971) as Magomedi
- Goodbye, Inesa! (მშვიდობით, ინესა!, 1972) as Alonso
- Seekers of the sunk city (ჩაძირული ქალაქის მაძიებლები, 1972) as Man with the glasses
- Kidnapping the Moon (მთვარის მოტაცება, 1973) as Arzakan Zvambai
- Autumn Sun (მზე შემოდგომისა, 1973) as Vakhtangi
- The Wishing Tree (ნატვრის ხე, 1976) as Elioz
- Data Tutashkhia (დათა თუთაშხია, 1978) as Data Tutashkhia
- Hello Everyone (გამარჯობა ყველას, 1980) as Nikala
- Way Back Home (გზა შინისაკენ, 1981)
- Brother (ძმა, 1981) as Paghava
- Khareba and Gogia (ხარება და გოგია, 1987) as Akhvlediani
- Turandot (ტურანდოტი, 1989) as Khozrevani
- White flags (თეთრი ბაირაღები, 1990) as Isidore
- Spiral (სპირალი, 1990) as David Giorgadze
- Get Thee Out (Изыди!, 1991) as Motya Rabinovich
- Iavnana (იავნანა, 1994) as mullah
- Past Shadows (წარსულის აჩრდილები, 1996) as Qaikhosro
