= Levan Gogoberidze =

Georgian and Soviet Politician

- ლევან ღოღობერიძე
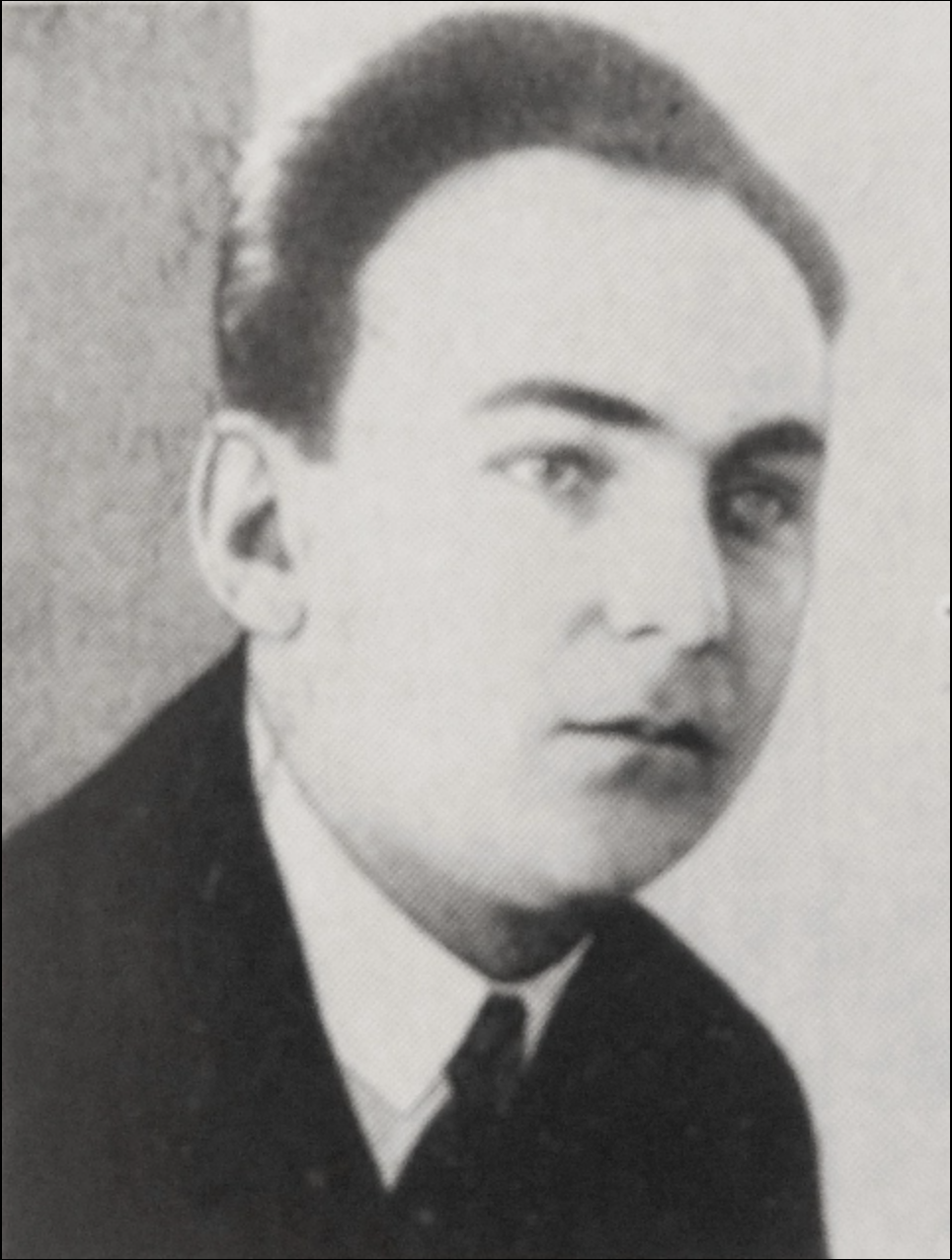

First Secretary of the Georgian Communist Party
- In office 6 May 1930 – 19 November 1930
- Preceded by: Mikheil Kakhiani
- Succeeded by: Samson Mamulia

Personal details
- Born: 21 January 1896 Pridonaan-Jikhaishi, Kutais Governorate, Russian Empire
- Died: 21 March 1937 (aged 41) Tbilisi, Georgian SSR, Soviet Union
- Party: Russian Communist Party (Bolsheviks) (1916–1936)
- Spouse: Nutsa Khutsishvili
- Children: Lana Gogoberidze
- Education: Institute of Red Professors
- Alma mater: Petrograd Polytechnic University

Levan Davidovich Gogoberidze (Georgian: ლევან ღოღობერიძე; Russian: Леван Давидович Гогоберидзе; 21 January 1896 – 21 March 1937) was a Soviet and Georgian Bolshevik and politician. He served as First Secretary of the Georgian Communist Party from 6 May to 19 November 1930.

== Biography ==
=== Early years ===
Levan Davidovich Gogoberidze was born on 21 January [O.S. 9 January] 1878 in Pridonaan-Jikhaishi, Kutais Governorate, Russian Empire into an old Georgian noble family. He graduated Petrograd Polytechnic University before joining the Communist Party in 1916 and after the February and later October Revolution he was made deputy chairman of his local soviet in Dzhikhaishi near Trapezund.

=== Baku ===
In May 1919 he was sent along with Anastas Mikoyan, to Baku in the recently independent Azerbaijan Democratic Republic as one of the leaders of the Bolshevik Faction in a Worker's Strike against the Musavat Party. After the strike Gogoberidze, Mikoyan and other leaders were arrested by the authorities and imprisoned together. After escaping imprisonment alongside Mikoyan, Gogoberidze was wounded in a shooting that took place in a café in central Baku that killed the two younger men he was eating dinner with. He was shot in the stomach and shoulder, and recovered after around 2 weeks in the hospital. The exact cause of the shooting is still a matter of debate but contemporary leftist reports alleged it was an assassination plot by the Musavat Party. After his recovery, in September 1920, it was decided by a plenum of the Central Committee of the Azerbaijan Communist Party, that Gogoberidze along with Aliheydar Garayev would be sent to Quba to quell an uprising, while there around 400 - 500 villagers where killed in operations he led along with Garayev.

=== Later career ===
After returning to Tbilisi, he began working through the ranks of Georgian Soviet leadership, after being in middle levels of leadership during the August Uprising, he was named Secretary of the Adjarian Regional Committee of the Communist Party of Georgia from 1924 to 1925. After this he went to Paris to do diplomatic and some intelligence work. After his return Tbilisi in 1926, he became a Secretary of the Georgian Communist Party, and wrote "Georgian Emigration and the Work of Anti-Soviet Parties" in 1927. He would eventually oversee a program under First Secretary Mikheil Kakhiani of both Collectivization and Dekulakization in Georgia. After the tempo of these programs was criticized by Stalin in an article in Pravda, Kakhiani and his faction were replaced by a new group led by Vissarion Lominadze. Gogoberidze would eventually take over as First Secretary of the Georgian Communist Party on 6 May 1930. He held the position for a little under 200 days, before being replaced as First Secretary by Samson Mamulia because of Lominadze, who made several statements at the 16th Party Congress criticizing the current methods of Collectivization and they were widely condemned as too 'leftist' and 'factionalist' by Party Leadership. This would later become known as the Syrtsov-Lominadze Affair, and resulted in Gogoberidze's brief tenure as First Secretary ending. After his removal, he went to Moscow to study at the Institute of Red Professors from 1930 to 1934. After graduating he worked as a party leader in Eisk and Rostov-on-Don. On 14 December 1936 he was arrested, and consequently on 21 March 1937 he was shot in Tbilisi as part of the Great Purge. His reputation was later rehabilitated along with other victims of the Great Purge after Stalin's death.

== Personal life ==
His wife Nutsa was a pioneering Soviet filmmaker and is thought to be the first Georgian woman to direct a feature film. His daughter Lana Gogoberidze, was also a notable Georgian director and had a political career serving in the Parliament of Georgia, the Parliamentary Assembly of the Council of Europe and later as the Georgian ambassador to France.

== Notes ==
Party political offices
Preceded by Mikheil Kakhiani	First Secretary of the Georgian Communist Party; 1930	Succeeded by Samson Mamulia
