= Irakli Charkviani =

Georgian musician

Irakli Charkviani ირაკლი ჩარკვიანი
- Born: 19 November 1961; Tbilisi, Georgian SSR
- Died: 24 February 2006 (aged 44) Tbilisi, Georgia
- Genres: electronic music, Hip-Hop, rock
- Occupations: musician, poet, writer
- Years active: 1976-2006

Irakli Charkviani (Georgian: ირაკლი ჩარკვიანი; 19 November 1961 – 24 February 2006), sometimes known under his pseudonym Mepe (მეფე, "The King"), was a Georgian musician, poet and prose writer. Charkviani was known for his eccentric image and poetry, and for eclectic music, which spanned alternative rock, electronic music and hip hop. He died of heart problems at the age of 44.

== Biography ==
Charkviani was born into an elite family in Tbilisi, the capital of then-Soviet Georgia. His father, the journalist and diplomat Gela Charkviani, was Georgia's former ambassador to the United Kingdom, and his grandfather Candide Charkviani was the first secretary of the Central Committee of the Georgian SSR Communist Party from 1938 to 1952. His great-grandfather was prominent Georgian artist Mose Toidze.

Charkviani graduated from the Department of Western European and American Literature, Tbilisi State University. His debut in 1976, with the indie rock project Arishi, passed unnoticed, but the later band Taxi had a greater success and recorded the eponymous album in 1988. In the 1980s, several of Charkviani's lyrics and short stories, noted for their rebellious character, were published in Georgian literary press. During this time, Charkviani collaborated with Kote Kubaneishvili to establish the Reactive Club (Georgian: რეაქტიული კლუბი), a revolutionary art-collective that ran counter to the accepted Soviet poetry style and was a reaction "against provincialism".

Early in the 1990s, Charkviani emerged as one of the leading artists on Georgia's alternative and electronic scene. Leading the projects Children's Medicine (1991-1992), and Georgian Dance Empire (1993), he performed throughout Georgia as well as abroad, particularly in Moscow and Eastern Europe. Charkviani's debut solo-album Svan Song was recorded in Germany in 1993 and proved to be a significant influence on the Georgian alternative music of the 1990s. He composed music for the feature film "Orpheus's Death" in 1995 and went on to record his second album Ap’ren in 1997, followed by the single Sakartvelo in 1999 and the albums Amo and Savse in 2001 and 2004, respectively. Around the same period, he chose the pseudonym of Mepe, meaning in Georgian "The King". Charkviani also authored several poems, stories, and a novel.

Charkviani was found dead, reportedly of "heart problems", at his apartment in Tbilisi on 24 February 2006, leaving several unpublished songs which were subsequently released as the album Dzirs Mepe ("Down with the King") in 2007. However, his drug abuse was widely known to the public at least since the early 1980s.

In May 2013 Irakli Charkviani was posthumously awarded Georgia's Rustaveli Prize for "his significant contribution to the development of contemporary Georgian culture".

On 19 November 2016 the memorial monument to Irakli Charkviani was unveiled in the central area of Tbilisi.

== In film and media ==
The film Tangerines concludes with "ქაღალდის გემი", a song by Charkviani from his 1993 album "Svan Songs".

== See also ==
- Kote Kubaneishvili

== Literary works ==
- Personal Letters, Intelekti Publishing, 2015
- A Calm Swim, Logos Press 2006, Intelekti Publishing, 2014
- Author's Columns Interviews, Intelekti Publishing, 2011
- Old Toys, Siesta Publishing House, 2009, 2012
- Mepe Irakli's Poetry, Siesta Publishing House, 2008, 2011.
