= Aleksandre Mirtskhulava =

Soviet politician; First Secretary of the Communist Party of Georgia (1911-2009)

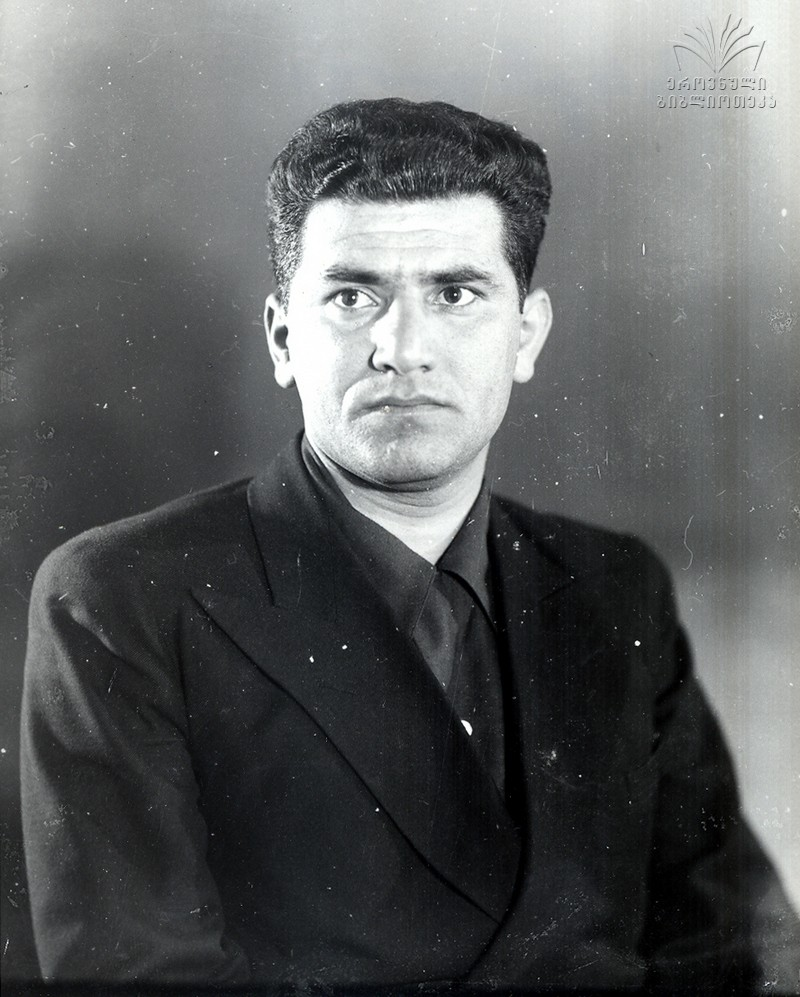
Aleksandre Mirtskhulava

Aleksandre Mirtskhulava or Aleksandr Iordanovich Mirtskhulava (Georgian: ალექსანდრე იორდანეს ძე მირცხულავა; Russian: Александр Иорданович Мирцхулава) (12 May 1911 – 9 June 2009) was a Georgian politician who was the First Secretary of the Communist Party of the Georgian SSR from 14 April to 20 September 1953.

Mirtskhulava was born in the village of Khorga (near Khobi) of Samegrelo-Zemo Svaneti. In 1930, he graduated from the Pedagogical Technical School of Zugdidi. By 1931 he was a raikom secretary; he became First Secretary of the Communist Union of Mtskheta in 1933 and of Khoni in 1935. From 1941 to 1943 he was the second secretary of the Communist Party of Abkhazia, and from 1943 to 1947 Chairman of the Council of Ministers of Abkhazia, in effect head of the government of Abkhazia.

Mirtskhulava was Lavrentiy Beria's Komsomol chairman and a strong supporter of Beria, and when Beria briefly took power after the death of Joseph Stalin, he restored his clients who suffered during the Mingrelian affair and appointed Mirtskhulava as First Secretary of the Georgian Party. Mirtskhulava was removed from the Central Committee bureau and expelled from the CC by a CC plenum held on 20 September 1953.

From 1953 until 1980 he held various responsible posts in the agricultural sector in Georgia.

He died in Tbilisi at the age of 98.

Party political offices
| Preceded by Akaki Mgeladze | First Secretary of the Georgian Communist Party; 1953 | Succeeded by Vasil Mzhavanadze |
