= Kote Kubaneishvili =

Georgian poet

Konstantine "Kote" Kubaneishvili (Georgian: კოტე ყუბანეიშვილი) is a Georgian poet known for his political and anti-establishment themes, who was at one point imprisoned by the Soviet authorities. In the 1980s, while Georgia was still part of USSR, Kubaneishvili collaborated with Irakli Charkviani to establish the Reactive Club (Georgian: რეაქტიული კლუბი), a "revolutionary art-collective" that ran counter to the accepted Soviet poetry style and was a reaction "against provincialism".

Kubaneishvili is known for his progressive views. He came out against the 2013 homophobic protests, calling ultra-conservative riot participants "morons" and stating "there's darkness here, that's clear as a day" (Georgian: აქ რომ სიბნელეა ეს ხომ ნათელია) In 2021, he criticized Rustaveli Theater and its director Robert Sturua for traveling to Russia to participate in a festival despite Russia occupying parts of Georgia; Kubaneishvili expressed belief that this visit was part of a pattern by the Georgian Dream-led government of pursuing openly pro-Russian policies and "playing a Russian game".
