= Gela Charkviani =

Georgian diplomat (1939–2021)

- გელა ჩარკვიანი
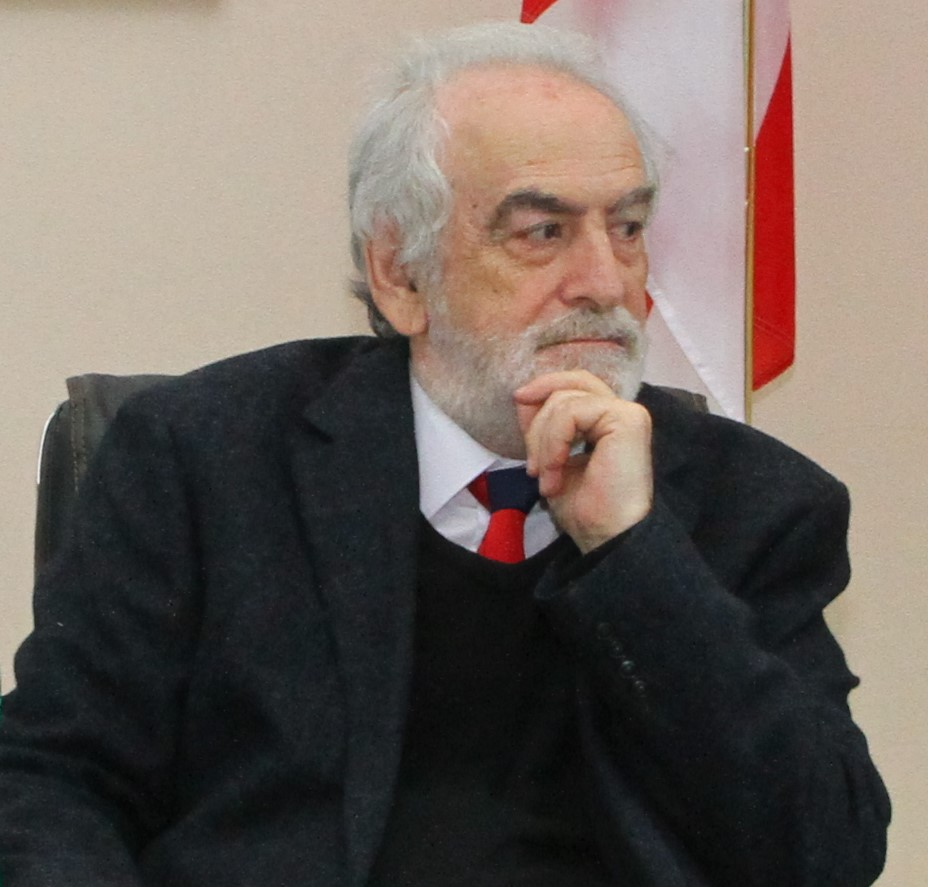
- Born: 1 March 1939; Tbilisi, Georgia USSR
- Died: 9 November 2021 (aged 82)
- Known for: Ambassador of Georgia to United Kingdom (under president Saakashvili 2006-2009)
- Children: Irakli Charkviani, Teona Charkviani
- Parents: Kandid Charkviani (father); Tamar Djaoshvili (mother)

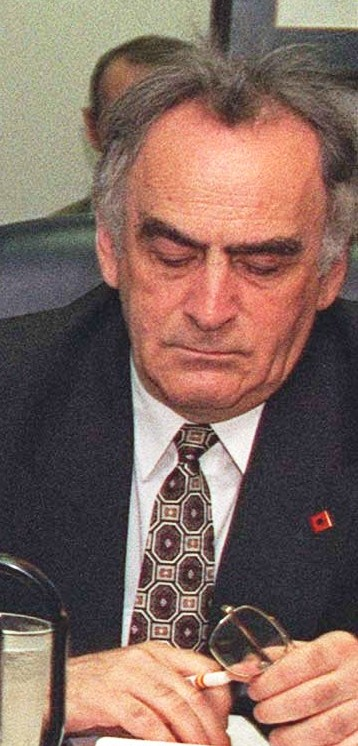
Charkviani in 1997

Gela Charkviani (Georgian: გელა ჩარკვიანი; 1 March 1939 – 9 November 2021) was a Georgian diplomat, writer, educator, and television personality.

== Early life ==
Gela Charkviani was born in Tbilisi on 1 March 1939 into the family of Kandid Charkviani, a leader of the Georgian Communist Party who had been accused in the Mingrelian Affair under Joseph Stalin, and his ophthalmologist wife Tamar Djaoshvili. He studied architecture at the Georgian Technical University and eventually graduated from the Chavchavadze Institute of Foreign Languages. Gela Charkviani's post-graduate studies included a semester at the University of Michigan, Ann Arbor in 1970, a period regarded as the peak of the Youth Revolution in the United States. The time spent at Ann Arbor, in Charkviani's opinion, has caused a major shift in his worldview.

== Television career ==
For 25 years thereafter Gela Charkviani taught English and later on, Sociology at the Chavchavadze Foreign Languages Institute and Tbilisi State University. From 1976 to 1994 he anchored the Georgian TV's monthly Globe program featuring profiles of the world nations. His five-part documentary Georgians in the Kremlin was aired by Rustavi-2 TV in September/October 2004.

From 1984 to 1992 Gela Charkviani was Vice-President of the Georgian Society for Cultural Relations.

== Political career ==
From 1992 to 2003 Charkviani was Chief Foreign Policy Adviser to President Eduard Shevardnadze.

In 2005 President Mikheil Saakashvili appointed him his spokesperson and in 2006 Ambassador of Georgia to the UK and Ireland. He retired from diplomatic service in September 2011.

Of the many interests he pursued for pleasure and relaxation, music remained central through Charkviani's life. A CD of his Piano Miniatures was released in 2004, followed in 2006 by that of his early work: a musical Nargiza and the Nonstop Luxury Express (1974). Charkviani's latest work is Irakliana - a triptych of three piano suites featuring tunes by his late son Irakli. His literary efforts include a modern Georgian language translation of Shakespeare's King Lear. The work was commissioned by the internationally acclaimed Georgian theater director Robert Sturua. The production had a successful run at the Rustaveli Drama Theater in Tbilisi in 1980s and '90s. It was also performed at various venues abroad.

== Writing career ==
In the summer of 2008 a book of texts of some of Charkviani's public appearances in his various capacities over the eleven-year period from 1997 to 2008 was released (in English). The book touches upon a considerable variety of issues widely regarded as significant for the newly independent nations of Eurasia and provides vital clues for today's state of affairs in the region.

In 2013 the “Artanuji Publishers” released Gela Charkviani's “An Interview with my Dad” – a dialogue between father and son, who not only belong to different generations, but also hold contrasting beliefs and dissimilar sets of values. The text is based on actual conversations that took place in 1989 – 1992. Already past eighty by that time Candide Charkviani was the only living person who had been directly involved in, and knew first-hand the specifics of relations between Stalin's Kremlin and the Soviet Georgia. After several editions of the book were brought out by the Artanuji, it was translated into Italian and published in 2016 by Palombi Editori under the title “La Dimensione Georgiana di Stalin.”

Charkviani's next work “Nagerala” (Self-sown seedlings) is a collection of excerpts from the notebook records he made over a period of twenty years. It was first published by “Intelecti” in 2014. Its second edition became Georgia's National Bestseller #2 in 2015.

The following work by Gela Charkviani published by “Intelecti” was a historical-diplomatic memoir titled “The Round Dance of Familiar Chimeras.” It is nearly 700 pages long and provides a detailed description of events that took place over the course of eleven years when Eduard Shevardnadze ruled Georgia. It was precisely then that the foundation was laid for the post-communist transformation of the country. As Shevardnadze's foreign policy adviser Charkviani was constantly at his side, attended all his meetings and often translated open, as well as confidential conversations the President held with his foreign counterparts. The text is an insider's narrative about all he lived to witness. Aside from politics, the book contains major elements of the author's biography – his privileged childhood and the tragedies of his later life, the death of his son and the unexpected demise of his beloved wife Nana. The epilogue of the book deals with the author's solipsistic attempts to come to terms with the excruciating pain of loss by denying the reality of the material world, which to him is no more than a “torrent of moving chimeras.”

On 23 December 2016, the Publishers’ Association of Georgia named “The Round Dance of Familiar Chimeras” National Bestseller of the year.

Charkviani's last works include sequels to Nagerala – Nagerala 2 and Nagerala 80. Along with the notebook records, the latter features a play and two short stories written by the author in 1970s. Also in 2018 Artanuji Publishers issued his collection of 70 short narratives titled “In Those Times,” depicting the life in Soviet Georgia.

== Personal life and death ==
Charkviani's awards include Order of Honour (1998), Presidential Order of Excellence (2011) and Victory Order of St. George (2013).

Gela was married to Nana Toidze-Charkviani and had one son and one daughter. His son Irakli Charkviani was an influential Georgian musician and writer.

Charkviani died on 9 November 2021 at the age of 82 in Tbilisi.
