= Nutsa Gogoberidze =

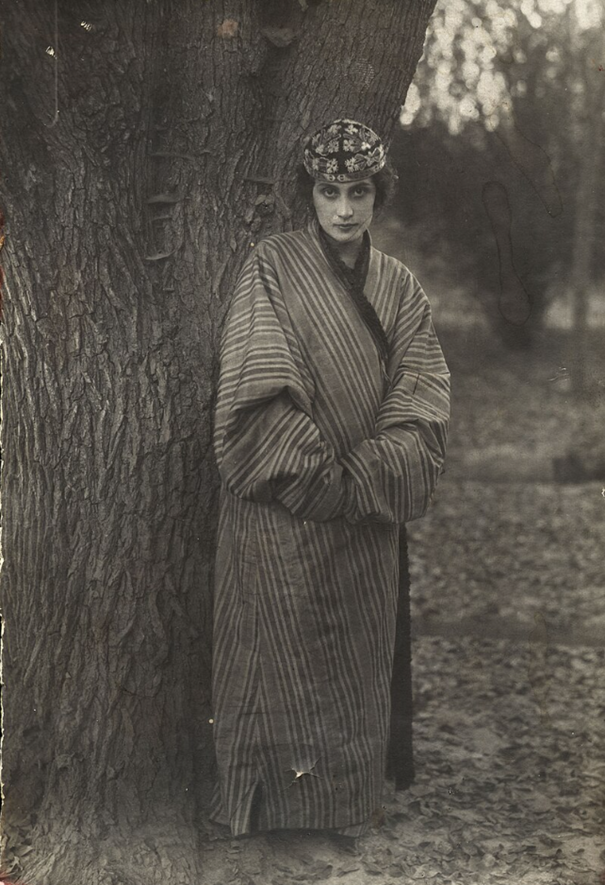
Nutsa Gogoberidze

Nino "Nutsa" Gogoberidze (also spelled Ghoghoberidze; Georgian: ნინო "ნუცა" ღოღობერიძე; 1903–1966) was a pioneering Georgian film director. She was an associate of Sergei Eisenstein and Alexander Dovzhenko. Her 1934 film Uzhmuri was the first Georgian feature film in the Soviet Union directed by a woman.

== Life ==
Nutsa Gogoberidze was born in Kakhi, Saingilo, in 1903. She obtained a degree from the philosophy department of the University of Jena.

She married Levan Gogoberidze, a communist party activist. In the 1930s, because of his activities, she was repressed. Following his execution in 1937, she was exiled for 10 years. Upon her return, she abandoned the film industry and joined the Linguistics Institute in Tbilisi.

Her daughter Lana Gogoberidze and granddaughter Salomé Alexi are also film directors.

Gogoberidze died in Tbilisi in 1966.

Gogoberidze's life was covered in the 2023 documentary Mother and Daughter, or the Night Is Never Complete, directed by Lana Gogoberidze and with Salomé Alexi as producer and co-director.

== Career ==
Gogoberidze's first film, Mati Samepo (Their Kingdom) was made with Mikhail Kalatozov.

In 1930, Gogoberidze released Buba, a dramatised propaganda film. This was almost immediately banned, and was not screened for decades. The reels remained with the Gosfilmofond, the Soviet (now Russian) film archive, and were handed over to the Georgians in 2016. Gogoberidze's feature-film Uzhmuri was released in 1934 and was also banned after it came out. The film was considered lost until it was found at Gosfilmofond in December 2018.

== Filmography ==
- Mati Samepo (Their Kingdom, 1928) (with Mikhail Kalatozov)
- Buba (1930, with David Kakabadze)
- Uzhmuri (1934)
