= Mikheil Kakhiani =

Soviet-Georgian statesman (1896–1937)

- მიხეილ კახიანი

First Secretary of the Georgian Communist Party
- In office August 1924 – May 1930
- Preceded by: Vissarion Lominadze
- Succeeded by: Levan Gogoberidze

Personal details
- Born: 1896 Batumi, Kutais Governorate, Russian Empire
- Died: 11 December 1937 (aged 40–41)
- Party: Communist Party of the Soviet Union
- Other political affiliations: Communist Party of Georgia

Mikheil Kakhiani (Georgian: მიხეილ კახიანი; 1896 – 11 December, 1937) was a Soviet and Georgian politician. He served as First Secretary of the Georgian Communist Party from August 1924 to May 1930.

A strong supporter of Joseph Stalin, Kakhiani ensured that after the 1924 August Uprising there would be no dissent from Georgia towards the Bolsheviks. He launched the collectivization of Georgian farms in 1931 and farmers were relocated to state-run farms while their produce, farming tools, and fields were destroyed. Those who resisted were deported to Siberia. Along with the party leadership, he also directed the cruel suppression of rebels and personally witnessed the execution of prisoners such as the shooting of Menshevik prisoners at Tbilisi.

In 1937 he was shot as part of the Great Purge. An account cited the weak leadership of Kakhiani along with Petre Aghniashvili and Mamia Orakhelasvili as a factor that helped the rise of Lavrentiy Beria.

== Notes ==
Party political offices
Preceded by Vissarion Lominadze	First Secretary of the Georgian Communist Party; August 1924 – May 1930	Succeeded by Levan Gogoberidze
