= Guranda Gabunia =

Georgian actess (1938–2019)

- გურანდა გაბუნია
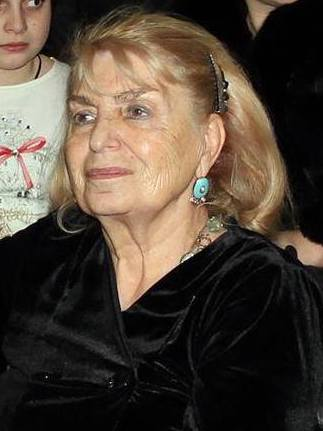
- Gabunia in 2015
- Born: 26 August 1938; Sukhumi, Georgia SSR, Soviet Union
- Died: 4 February 2019 (aged 80); Tbilisi, Georgia
- Education: Shota Rustaveli Theatre and Film University
- Occupation: Actress
- Spouse: Otar Megvinetukhutsesi

Guranda Gabunia (Georgian: გურანდა გაბუნია; 26 August 1938 – 4 February 2019) was a Georgian stage and film actress.

== Early life ==
Gabunia was born on 26 August 1938 in Sukhumi, Georgia SSR, Soviet Union.Her father was the artistic director of the Sukhumi Theatre and her mother was the actress Nora Kipiani. As a child, she wanted to be a dancer.

She graduated in 1960 from the Shota Rustaveli Theatre and Film University.

== Career ==
After graduating, she joined the Rustaveli Theatre company. Between 1961 and 1975, she worked at that theatre and Rustavi Theatre in Tbilisi. From 1975, Gabunia was an actress at the Marjanishvili Theatre. She appeared in at least 20 films, making her debut with Under One Sky in 1961 and in others such as Data Tutashkia, Oromtrial Autumn Sun, Day Is Longer Than Night, and Tbilisi Is My Home.

She was awarded the title of People’s Artist of Georgian SSR, and received the Order of Honour and the Kote Marjanishvili Prize.

== Personal life ==
Gabunia met the actor Otar Meghvinetukhutsesi when she was 19 and both were studying at drama school; two years later, they married. He passed away on 9 May 2013.

She died on 4 February 2019 at the age of 80 after an illness. The civil funeral took place in Marjanishvili Theatre and was buried on 9 February alongside her husband in Didube Pantheon.
