= List of ambassadors of Georgia to France =

Representative of Georgia to the United Kingdom

Coordinates: 48.871541°N 2.285312°E

Ambassador of Georgia to France
- საქართველოს ელჩი საფრანგეთში
- Seal of the Ministry of Foreign Affairs of Georgia
- Incumbent; Irakli Kurashvili since September 1, 2025
- Ministry of Foreign Affairs of Georgia; Embassy of Georgia, Paris
- Style: His or Her Excellency (formal); Mr. or Madam Ambassador (informal)
- Reports to: Minister of Foreign Affairs of Georgia
- Seat: Paris, France
- Nominator: Prime Minister of Georgia
- Appointer: President of Georgia
- Inaugural holder: Gotcha Tchogovadzé
- Formation: November 20, 1993
- Website: france.mfa.gov.ge

The Georgian ambassador to France (known formally as the Ambassador Extraordinary and Plenipotentiary of Georgia to the French Republic) is the official representative of the president of Georgia and the Georgian Government to the President and government of France.

The ambassador is regularly accredited to the government in Monaco and at the UNESCO.

== List of representatives ==
Diplomatic accreditation	ambassador	Georgian language	Observations	Prime Minister of Georgia	President of France	Term end
November 20, 1993	Gotcha Tchogovadzé	გოჩა ჩოგოვაძე		Eduard Shevardnadze	François Mitterrand	February 17, 2004
February 17, 2004	Lana Gogoberidze	ლანა ღოღობერიძე	interim	Zurab Zhvania	Jacques Chirac	September 6, 2004
November 3, 2004	Natia Djaparidzé	ნათია ჯაფარიძე		Zurab Zhvania	Jacques Chirac	January 17, 2007
March 28, 2007	Mamuka Kudava	მამუკა კუდავა		Giorgi Baramidze	Nicolas Sarkozy	October 5, 2012
May 13, 2013	Ecateriné Siradzé-Delaunay	ეკატერინე სირაძე-დელონე		Bidzina Ivanishvili, Irakli Garibashvili	François Hollande	August 1, 2018
January 15, 2023	Gotcha Javakhishvili	გოჩა ჯავახიშვილი		Irakli Garibashvili	Emmanuel Macron	May 9, 2024
September 1, 2025	Irakli Kurashvili	ირაკლი ყურაშვილი		Irakli Kobakhidze	Emmanuel Macron	
