= Vasil Mzhavanadze =

Georgian Soviet politician (1902–1988)

- ვასილ მჟავანაძე
- Mzhavanadze in 1957

First Secretary of the Georgian Communist Party
- In office 20 September 1953 – 29 September 1972
- Preceded by: Aleksandre Mirtskhulava
- Succeeded by: Eduard Shevardnadze

Candidate member of the 20th, 22nd, 23rd, 24th Politburo
- In office 29 June 1957 – 18 December 1972

Full member of the 20th, 22nd, 23rd, 24th Central Committee
- In office 29 June 1957 – 18 December 1972

Personal details
- Born: 20 September 1902 Kutaisi, Russian Empire
- Died: 31 August 1988 (aged 85) Moscow, Russian SFSR, Soviet Union
- Party: Communist Party of the Soviet Union (1927–1972)
- Spouse(s): Anna Ianko; Victoria Tereshkevich
- Children: 4
- Awards: Hero of Socialist Labour

Military service
- Branch/service: MVD
- Years of service: 1924–1950
- Rank: Lieutenant general

Vasil Pavlovich Mzhavanadze (Georgian: ვასილ მჟავანაძე; 20 September [O.S. 7 September] 1902 – 31 August 1988) was a Georgian Soviet politician who served as the First Secretary of the Communist Party of the Georgian SSR from September 1953 to September 28, 1972 and a member of the CPSU's Politburo from June 29, 1957 to December 18, 1972. Dismissed after a corruption scandal, he was replaced by Eduard Shevardnadze.

== Career ==
Vasili Mzhavanadze was born in Kutaisi. He left school at the age of 12 and was a factory worker for ten years. In 1924, he joined the Red Army. There is no record of his holding an office of any kind in his native Georgia during the next 29 years. He joined the Communist Party in 1927, and after graduating from the Leningrad Military-Political Academy, served as a political commissar during World War II. After the war, he became deputy commander for political affairs in the Kiev military district in the Ukrainian SSR, under the administration of Ukrainian Communist Party leader (and later Soviet leader) Nikita Khrushchev.

Georgia was at this time ruled by supporters of Lavrentiy Beria, who had been the First Secretary of the Georgian Communist Party from 1931 to 1938. In July 1953, following the death of Soviet leader Joseph Stalin and the arrest of Beria, the leadership of the Georgian Communist Party was purged by Khrushchev's supporters. Mzhavanadze left the army and went back to Georgia to lead the Party, replacing Beria's protégé Aleksandre Mirtskhulava as First Secretary in September 1953. In an unprecedented display of military presence on the political arena, Mzhavanadze was joined in the Georgian Central Committee by the generals Alexi Inauri and Aleksei Antonov. When Khrushchev became the leader of the USSR in 1957, Mzhavanadze was appointed to become a candidate (non-voting) member of the Soviet Politburo.

Though Mzhavanadze owed his promotion to Khrushchev, in September 1962, he resisted Khrushchev's sudden decision to split local communist party organisations into two parts, with separate first secretaries, one responsible for industry, the other for agriculture. Publicly, Mzhavanadze declared in November 1962 that he 'shared a fully supported' the reorganisation, but in March 1965, after Khrushchev's fall, he claimed to have been in touch at the time with 'many' members of the Central Committee who had told Khrushchev to his face that the plan would not work. He was one of the small number of high ranking officials who knew in advance that Khrushchev was to be ousted in October 1964.

After Khrushchev's fall, Mzhavanadze also seemed to have decided that the exposure of Stalin's crimes had gone too far. In June 1965, he arranged for the museum in Stalin's birthplace, Gori to be reopened, and praised Stalin's remark that 'Our Party is a fortress whose gates open only for tried and true people.'

Georgia prospered during Mzhavanadze's term of office against a background of corruption. Mzhavanadze himself became a symbol of corrupt, inefficient governance. He was accused of auctioning jobs, pocketing state funds and running illegal factories for his own enrichment;

In mid-1972, Mzhavanadze was publicly accused of corruption and was denounced by the state-controlled media. He resigned from his post as First Secretary on September 28, 1972, and was replaced by his ambitious Interior Minister, Eduard Shevardnadze. It has widely been speculated that Shevardnadze had a hand in his boss's downfall; he was certainly the obvious candidate to replace Mzhavanadze. On December 18, Mzhavanadze was sacked from his Politburo position and retired to Georgia in disgrace. He died in Moscow in 1988. He was honoured with a state funeral in Tbilisi.

Party political offices
Preceded by Aleksandre Mirtskhulava	First Secretary of the Georgian Communist Party; 1953–1972	Succeeded by Eduard Shevardnadze
