= Didi Lilo =

Daba in Georgia

Coordinates: 41.7268°N 44.9635°E

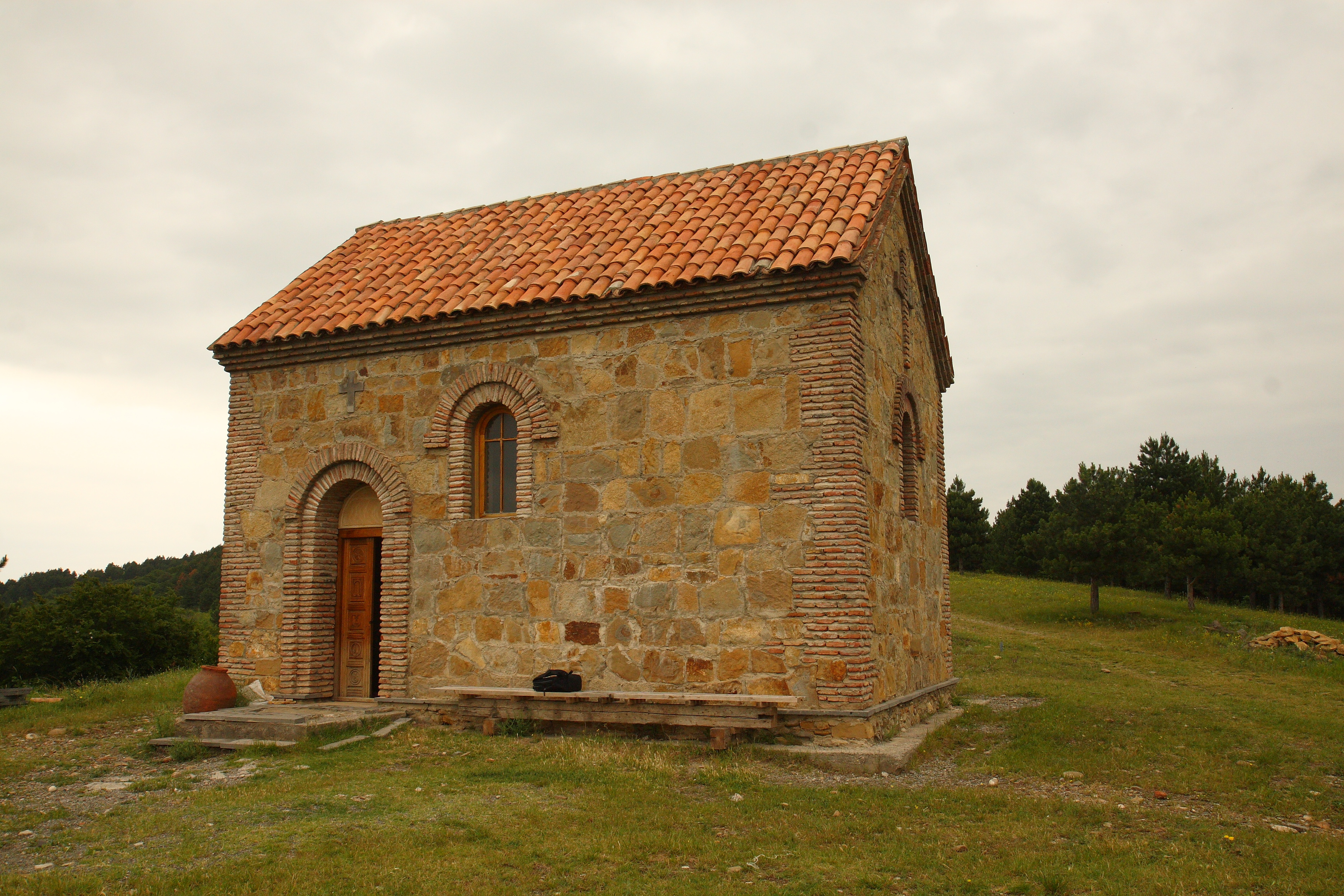
House in Didi Lilo

Didi Lilo (Georgian: დიდი ლილო) is a daba (small town) in the country of Georgia, located on the Iori Plateau on the outskirts of Tbilisi. It has a population of around 2,400. In 1974, it was granted the status of city. It is a rural village with a small agricultural industry. The town is best known for being the birthplace of some members of Joseph Stalin's family, including Stalin's father Besarion Jughashvili.

== See also ==
- Kvemo Kartli
