= St Michael's University Hospital, Tbilisi =

Saint Michael's University Hospital

Geography
- Location: Tbilisi, Georgia

Services
- Beds: 200

History
- Opened: November 8, 1868; 157 years ago

Links
- Website: mikhailovi.ge

Saint Michael's University Hospital (Georgian: წმინდა მიქაელის საუნივერსიტეტო ჰოსპიტალი), formerly knowns as Michael's Hospital or Mikhailovsk Hospital is a private hospital in Tbilisi, Georgia. The hospital has 200 beds.

== History ==
At the beginning of the 19th century, only a military hospital functioned in Tbilisi, which was also used by civilians. On August 30, 1820, the Public Welfare Department purchased a house in Tbilisi, near the current Erekle Square, from a private individual and opened a 12-bed hospital.

Later, the hospital was expanded to 35 beds. In 1829, it was moved to Avlabari, to the building of the former barracks and silk factory (in 1842, it was expanded to 50 beds), and in 1848, to the city center, on Velyaminov Street (now Shalva Dadiani Street), from where in 1858, due to fear of the spread of infectious diseases, it was again placed on the outskirts of the city (on Vera).

Due to the growth of the population of Tbilisi, in 1864–65, the government appointed a special commission headed by the Honored Physician Alexei Libau, which was tasked with organizing the construction of a new typical hospital in the city. The commission purchased a plot of land on Mikheili Street, now Davit Agmashenebeli Avenue (N60), specifically for the hospital. The construction of the hospital was entrusted to the famous German architect Alexander Salzmann. After his death, the construction of the hospital was headed by the German architect Leopold Bielefeld.

The construction of the hospital was completed in 1865. It was officially opened on November 8, 1868. On October 14, 1881, in honor of the brother of the Russian Emperor Alexander II, Grand Duke Mikhail Nikolaevich, the hospital was named "Mikhail's Hospital".

On January 18, 1899, the hospital was given an X-ray machine purchased in Munich for 1,234 manats through the charity of Barbare Mukhranbatoni.

Several departments functioned in the “Mikhailovsky Hospital”: therapeutic, surgical, psychiatric, neurological, acute infectious and venereal diseases, syphilis, skin, urological, gynecological, ophthalmological, emergency and morgue.

The Soviet revolutionary Kamo died in the hospital from injuries received in an accident. In 1918, the Georgian artist Niko Pirosmani died in the hospital.

In 1921–25, the hospital was named the Hospital of the People's Commissariat of Health of the Georgian SSR.

In 1925–41, the Central Clinical Institute of the Republic. Since 1941 it has been called the Central Clinical Hospital of the Republic. In 1954 it was named after Nikoloz Kipshidze. In 1974 the clinic moved to a new building – on Vazha-Pshavela Avenue, and the hospital located on David Agmashenebeli Avenue was transformed into the 5th Center for Emergency and Disaster Medicine, then – into the TSU Clinical Hospital.

Since 2012, part of it has moved to Ljubljana Street and been named St. Michael the Archangel Multidisciplinary Clinical Hospital, and the building remaining at the old address has been sold.
