= Guram Mamulia =

Soviet-Georgian historian, politician, and Meskhetian Turkish activist

Guram Mamulia (Georgian: გურამ მამულია; May 9, 1937 – January 1, 2003) was a Georgian historian, politician and campaigner for Meskhetian rights. A month after Mamulia was born, his father, Samson Mamulia was imprisoned and executed by Joseph Stalin's government. He was raised by his aunt. He graduated with a degree in history from Tbilisi State University in 1960. He began teaching at Tbilisi University in 1973.

== Dissident and Meskhetian rights activist ==
In 1981 he was expelled from the Communist Party after protesting on behalf of dissidents. In 1983 he was removed from his position at the University for publishing an article condemning the Treaty of Georgievsk of 1783 whereby Russia established a protectorate over Georgia. In 1988 he was a co-founder of the Ilia Chavchavadze Society. The next year he helped found the Georgian Memorial Society which was devoted to memorializing victims of the Soviets. He was a supporter of Eduard Shevardnadze and was elected to Georgia's parliament in 1992 where he was involved in inter-ethnic relations. He helped found the independent Association for the Repatriation and Integration of Meskhetians which supported the repatriation of Meskhetians as a condition to enter the Council of Europe and he was involved with the International Black Sea University, a UN supported program for cooperation between Georgian and Turkish academics.
