= Mingrelian affair =

Criminal cases fabricated in 1951–52 to accuse members of the Georgian SSR

The Mingrelian affair, or Mingrelian case (Russian: Мингрельское дело, mingrel’skoe delo; Georgian: მეგრელთა საქმე, megrelt’a sak’me), was a series of criminal cases fabricated in 1951 and 1952 in order to accuse several members of the Georgian SSR Communist Party of Mingrelian extraction of secession and collaboration with the Western powers.

== Events ==
Initiated on the personal orders of the Soviet leader Joseph Stalin, the affair apparently aimed at eliminating the influence of Lavrentiy Beria, of whom Stalin was growing increasingly suspicious. The fabricated accusations of forming the "Mingrelian nationalist ring", separatism, collaboration with the "Western imperialists", and the Georgian émigré centre in Paris, were followed by a purge, which delivered a hard blow to the Georgian party organization, and specifically targeted its Mingrelian (a subethnic group of the Georgians) members, mostly Beria's protégés. Many leading officials were removed from their posts and arrested; thousands of innocent people were subjected to repressions. Kandid Charkviani, who at the time occupied the position of the first secretary of the Georgian SSR, also suffered during the Mingrelian Affair. For years historians erroneously thought that Kandid Charkviani was Mingrelian and that he was punished because of his links with Beria. However, the newly opened archives in Georgia provide evidence that Charkviani, who was Lechkhumian (from the Lechkhumi region of Georgia) and not Mingrelian or Svan, was accused because he allegedly failed to “detect and repress the criminal nationalist ring of counter revolutionaries within the ranks of the Georgian Communist Party”. Moreover, it has emerged that Charkviani's relations with Beria had always been strained and that Beria tolerated Charkviani only because the latter was supported by Stalin. Immediately following Stalin's death, all Beria's clients who suffered during the Mingrelian Affair were restored. Yet Charkviani, on Beria's orders, was separated from his family and moved to Soviet Central Asia into exile.

Many aspects of the Mingrelian affair are still not completely understood. Beyond Stalin's growing distrust of his lieutenant Beria, who had particularly consolidated his positions after World War II, the affair also reflected a bitter power struggle among rival clans in the Communist élite of Georgia. It might also have echoed similar accusations of Georgian nationalism leveled against the "National Communists" in the 1922 Georgian affair.

As a result of the events, Beria's power was reduced significantly in Georgia, but he still managed to retain his position in the Politburo. After Stalin's death in 1953, Beria managed to temporarily reinstate his clients in Georgia. However, later many of them were prosecuted as the members of "Beria's gang".

In his memoirs Nikita Khrushchev corroborated the thesis of eliminating the influence of Lavrentiy Beria and eventual rehabilitation of its victims.

== Literature ==
- Suny, Ronald Grigor (1994), The Making of the Georgian Nation: 2nd edition, pp. 287–289. Indiana University Press, ISBN 0-253-20915-3.
- Lang, David Marshall (1962). A Modern History of Georgia, pp. 260–261. London: Weidenfeld and Nicolson.
