= Lana Gogoberidze =

Georgian politician and film director

- ლანა ღოღობერიძე
- Lana Gogoberidze at the Frankfurt Book Fair in 2018.
- Born: Lana Gogoberidze; October 13, 1928 (age 97); Tbilisi, Georgian SSR, Soviet Union
- Occupations: Film director, diplomat, politician
- Years active: 1958–present
- Notable work: Day Is Longer Than Night (1984)
- Spouse: Vladimir Aleksi-Meskhishvili (m. 1958–1978; his death)
- Children: 2 (including Salomé Alexi)
- Awards: State Award of the USSR; State Award of the Georgian SSR; People's Artist of Georgia; French Legion of Honour; Dark Nights Film Festival Lifetime Achievement Award (Estonia)

Lana Gogoberidze (Georgian: ლანა ღოღობერიძე; born 13 October 1928 in Tbilisi) is a Georgian film director, as well as a former diplomat and member of parliament.

== Biography ==
Gogoberidze's mother was Nutsa Gogoberidze, another notable female Georgian director. Her father, Levan Gogoberidze, was murdered as a part of the Great Purge in 1937, while her mother was sent to a prison camp for twelve years.

Because of the situation with her parents, Gogoberidze was first sent to an orphanage and later taken in by her aunts. She also wanted to become a director, but the relevant education was not accessible to her because both her parents were being politically persecuted. She instead studied English and American literature, including the work of Walt Whitman, at Tbilisi State University. Following the death of Stalin, she could go on to study at the Department of Film-making of Moscow State University, from which she graduated in 1958. Gogoberidze headed the Director's Studio at the Rustaveli Theatre School, Tbilisi, in 1975.

In 1988, she became President of the International Association of Women Directors. She was elected to the Parliament of Georgia from 1992 to 1995. From 1996 to 2000, she was a member of the Parliamentary Assembly of the Council of Europe. In 2004, she served as Georgia's Ambassador to France.

Gogoberidze's fiction and documentary movies have won several international awards. Her film Day Is Longer Than Night was entered into the 1984 Cannes Film Festival. In the same year, she was a member of the jury at the 34th Berlin International Film Festival. She also holds the State Award of the USSR, the State Award of the Georgian SSR, the People's Artist of the Republic of Georgia and the French Legion of Honour.

Gogoberidze was married beginning in 1958 to the architect Vladimir Aleksi-Meskhishvili (died 1978). She has two daughters, with Salomé Alexi also becoming a director.

== See also ==
- Nana Jorjadze
