= Communist Party of Georgia (Soviet Union) =

Communist Party of Georgia საქართველოს კომუნისტური პარტია
- Leader: Mamia Orakhelashvili (1921–1922); Jemal Mikeladze (1991)
- Founded: 2 March 1921
- Dissolved: 26 August 1991
- Succeeded by: Communist Party of Georgia
- Ideology: Communism; Marxism–Leninism
- Political position: Far-left
- National affiliation: Communist Party of the Soviet Union
- Colours: Red
- Supreme Soviet (1990): 64 / 250 (26%)

Party flag

The Communist Party of Georgia (Georgian: საქართველოს კომუნისტური პარტია, romanized: sakartvelos k'omunist'uri p'art'ia; Russian: Коммунистическая партия Грузии) was the founding and ruling political party of the Georgian Soviet Socialist Republic.

Georgia was incorporated into the Soviet Union as the Georgian Soviet Socialist Republic after 25 February 1921 when the Red Army entered its capital Tbilisi and installed a communist government led by Georgian Bolshevik Filipp Makharadze. In 1922, the Georgian SSR was incorporated into the Transcaucasian Socialist Federative Soviet Republic which lasted until 1936. During its period as a Soviet Socialist Republic it was ruled by the First Secretary of the Georgian Communist Party including; Samson Mamulia, Lavrentiy Beria, Candide Charkviani, Vasil Mzhavanadze and Eduard Shevardnadze.

On August 26, 1991, by the decision of the Georgian parliament, the Communist Party was banned. Its political descendant is the Communist Party of Georgia which was formed in 1992.

== First Secretaries of the Communist Party of Georgia ==
- Mamia Orakhelashvili (1921–1922)
- Mikheil Okujava (1922)
- Vissarion Lominadze (1922–1924)
- Mikheil Kakhiani (1924–1930)
- Levan Gogoberidze (1930)
- Samson Mamulia (1930–1931)
- Lavrenti Kartvelishvili (1931)
- Lavrentiy Beria (1931–1932; 1934–1938)
- Petre Agniashvili (1932–1934)
- Kandid Charkviani (1938–1952)
- Akaki Mgeladze (1952–1953)
- Aleksandre Mirtskhulava (1953)
- Vasil Mzhavanadze (1953–1972)
- Eduard Shevardnadze (1972–1985)
- Jumber Patiashvili (1985–1989)
- Givi Gumbaridze (1989–1990)
- Avtandil Margiani (1990–1991)
- Jemal Mikeladze (1991)
