= Melekeduri =

Melekeduri მელექედური
- Village
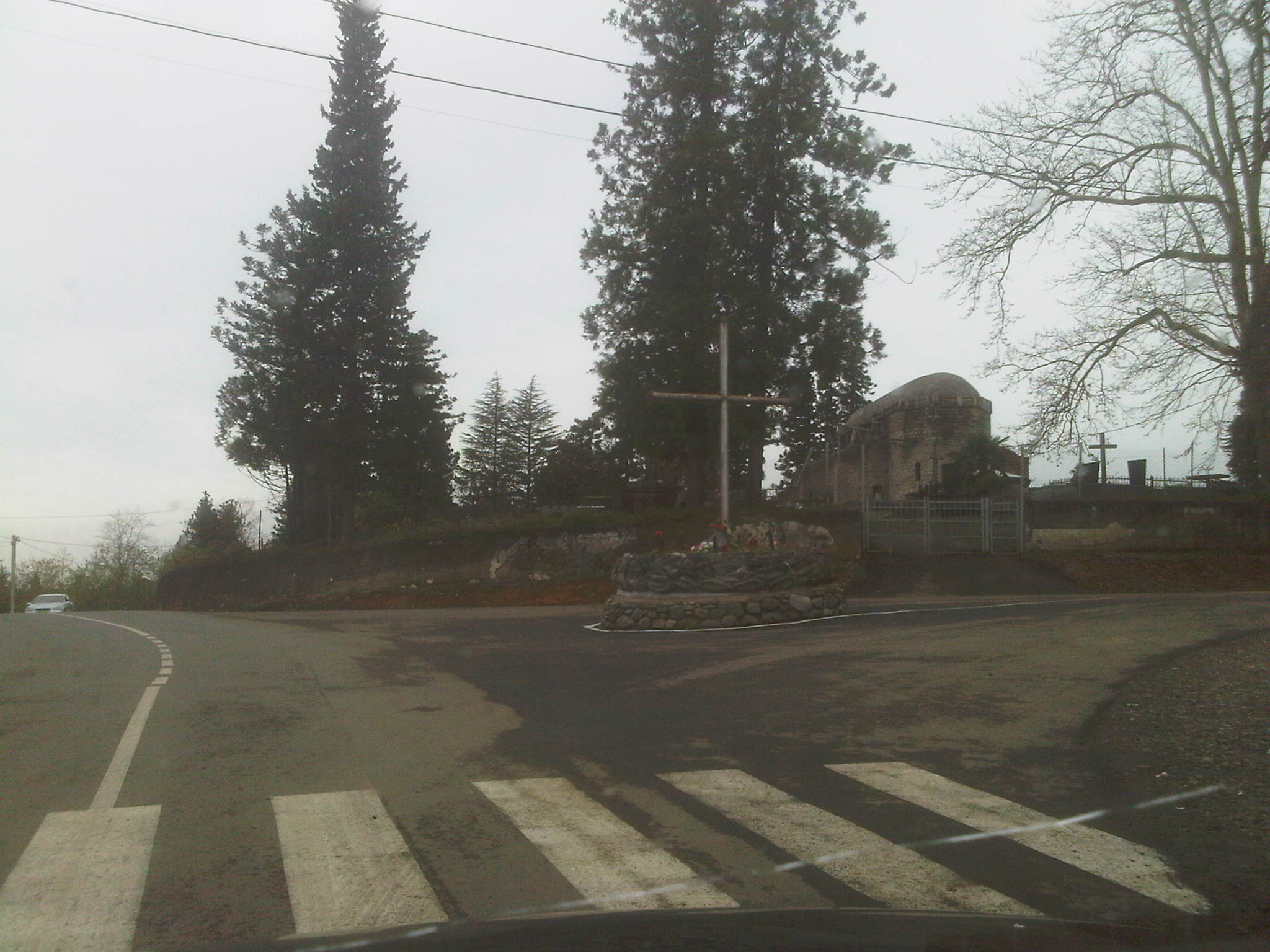

- Location within Georgia Location within Guria
- Coordinates: 41°56′53″N 42°01′26″E
- Country: Georgia
- Mkhare: Guria
- Municipality: Ozurgeti
- Elevation: 90 m (300 ft)

Population (2014)
  - Total: 1,170
- Time zone: UTC+4 (Georgian Time)

Melekeduri (Georgian: მელექედური) is a village in the Ozurgeti Municipality of Guria in western Georgia.
