= Akaki Mgeladze =

Soviet politician (1910–1980)

- აკაკი მგელაძე (Georgian); Акакий Мгеладзе (Russian)

First Secretary of the Georgian Communist Party
- In office 2 April 1952 – 14 April 1953
- Preceded by: Kandid Charkviani
- Succeeded by: Aleksandre Mirtskhulava

First Secretary of the Communist Party of Abkhazia
- In office February 1943 – November 1951
- Preceded by: Mikhail Baramiya
- Succeeded by: Shota Getia

Personal details
- Born: 1910 Melekeduri, Ozurgeti uezd, Kutaisi Governorate, Russian Empire
- Died: 1980 (aged 69–70) Ozurgeti, Guria, Georgian SSR, Soviet Union
- Party: Communist Party of the Soviet Union

Akaki Mgeladze (Georgian: აკაკი მგელაძე; Russian: Ака́кий Ива́нович Мгела́дзе; 1910 – 2 October 1980) was a Soviet politician. He served as First Secretary of the Georgian Communist Party from 1952 to 1953, and before that was First Secretary of the Communist Party of Abkhazia from 1943 until 1951, as well as previously leading both the Georgian and Abkhazian Komsomol and Gruzneft.

== Life and career ==
=== Pre-WW2 ===
Born in the Guria region of Georgia, into the Mgeladze family, then part of the minor Russian nobility. Mgeladze had grown up in Abkhazia and was serving with the military on the Transcaucasus Front when he was appointed head of the Communist Party of Abkhazia by Joseph Stalin. Under Mgeladze, Georgian was made the language of instruction in Abkhazia, replacing Abkhaz and Russian at the start of the 1945–1946 academic year.

=== Friendship with Stalin ===
After the Second World War, Mgeladze became a confidant of Stalin, who nicknamed him “Comrade Wolf”. He made a declaration that Abkhazia would produce lemons for the entirety of the Soviet Union after Stalin repeatedly showed him lemon trees. Using his influence with Stalin, Mgeladze manoeuvred against head of the Ministry of State Security Lavrentiy Beria, denouncing his corruption and that of Stalin’s other confidant Kandid Charkviani, who was an ally of Beria. Mgeladze succeeded in convincing Stalin to turn against Charkviani and strengthened his distrust of Beria. In March 1952 Mgeladze was appointed First Secretary of the Georgian Communist Party by Beria, replacing Charkviani.

== Resignation and later life ==
He held his position until he was forced out by Beria in April 1953, after Stalin's death. Forced to admit that he took bribes while head of the Communist Party of Abkhazia, Mgeladze was only able to remain a Party member because his successor in Georgia, Aleksandre Mirtskhulava, refused to expel him. After that he served as the chairman of the Bibnisi collective farm, located in the Kareli Municipality.

Mgeladze wrote a memoir, Сталин Каким я его знал: Страницы недавнего прошлого (Stalin As I Knew Him: Pages of the Recent Past), and died on 2 October 1980. For his efforts Mgeladze was awarded two Orders of Lenin, as well as the Order of the Red Banner of Labour, Order of the Red Star, Order of the Patriotic War, two Orders of the Badge of Honour, and others.

== Sources ==
- Mgeladze, Akaki. Сталин Каким я его знал: Страницы недавнего прошлого (Stalin As I Knew Him: Pages of the Recent Past), 2001.
- Montefiore, Simon Sebag (2003). Stalin: The Court of the Red Tsar. Vintage Books. ISBN 1400076781.
- Suny, Ronald Grigor (1994). The Making of the Georgian Nation. Bloomington, Indiana: Indiana University Press.

Party political offices
Preceded by Candide Charkviani	First Secretary of the Georgian Communist Party; 1952–1953	Succeeded by Aleksandre Mirtskhulava
Preceded by Mikhail Baramiya	First Secretary of the Abkhazian Communist Party; 1943–1951	Succeeded by Shota Getia
