= Lavrenty Kartvelishvili =

Georgian Soviet politician

- ლავრენტი ქართველიშვილი
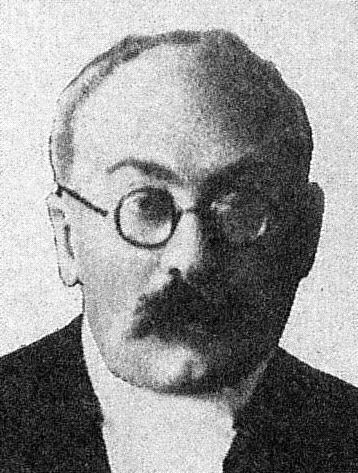

First Secretary of the Communist Party of Georgia
- In office 11 September 1931 – 14 November 1931
- Preceded by: Samson Mamulia
- Succeeded by: Lavrentiy Beria

Chairman of the Council of People's Commissars of the Georgian SSR
- In office June 1927 – 1929
- Preceded by: Shalva Eliava
- Succeeded by: Filipp Makharadze

Chairman of the Central Executive Committee of the Georgian SSR
- In office 14 June 1927 – April 1928
- Preceded by: Filipp Makharadze
- Succeeded by: Filipp Makharadze

Personal details
- Born: Lavrenty Iosifovich Kartvelishvili; 28 April 1890 Tiflis, Russian Empire
- Died: 22 September 1938 (aged 48) Kommunarka shooting ground, Moscow, Soviet Union
- Party: All-Union Communist Party (b) (1910–1937)

Lavrenty Iosifovich Kartvelishvili (Russian: Лавре́нтий Ио́сифович Картвелишви́ли; Georgian: ლავრენტი იოსების ძე ქართველიშვილი, romanized: lavrent'i iosebis dze kartvelishvili; 28 April [O.S. 16 April] 1890 – 22 August 1938) was a Georgian Bolshevik revolutionary and Soviet politician who served as the First Secretary of the Georgian Communist Party from 11 September to 14 November 1931.

== Biography ==
A son of a peasant, he was born on 16 (28) April 1890 in the village of Yaneti in Tiflis province. Involved in the revolutionary movement since 1905, he was a member of the Russian Social Democratic Labour Party since 1910. In 1911 he studied at the Kiev Commercial Institute, which he graduated in 1914.

During the October Revolution he was in Kyiv and became one of the organizers of the struggle for Soviet power in Ukraine. He was chairman of the regional committee of the RSDLP in Kiev, member of the revolutionary and underground district and city committee of the CP in Odesa. In 1919–1920, he was first secretary and then head of the organizational department of the CP District Committee in Odessa.

He was First Secretary of the Central Committee of the Communist Party (Bolshevik Party) of Georgia in 1923–1928, chairman of the Central Executive Committee of the Georgian SSR in 1927–1928, and chairman of the Council of People's Commissars of the Georgian SSR in 1927–1929. In 1929–31, he was chief of the political directorate of the Red Army in Ukraine, and second secretary of the Ukrainian communist party, where part of his role was to suppress peasant rebellions during the drive to force peasant families to surrender their land and join collective farms, which led to the mass famine known as Holodomor.

In December 1930, Besso Lominadze, First Secretary of the Transcaucasian party committee (covering Georgia, Armenia and Azerbaijan), was dismissed for criticising the drive towards collectivisation, and Kartvelishvili was recalled to Tbilisi to replace him. He proceeded to push ahead with collectivation at a rate that even Joseph Stalin thought was excessive. In August 1931, while on holiday in the region, Stalin wrote to his deputy, Lazar Kaganovich complaining that the "reckless methods" introduced by Kartvelishvili and his associates had "brought a number of districts in western Georgia to the point of famine" and that they were "arresting people by the hundreds". Later in the month, in another letter, he complained that "in the region, almost everybody lies and tries to outsmart the others, beginning with Kartvelishvili." Stalin's first move was to sack the secretary of the Georgian communist party, and on 11 September, Kartvelishvili was appointed First Secretary of the Georgian Communist Party, in addition to his post as head of Transccaucasian regional party.

In October 1931, Kartvelashvili was summoned to Moscow, with other regional leaders, to meet Stalin, who complained that Transcaucasia was being run by "chieftains" who too fond of drinking wine, and nominated Lavrentiy Beria to be Second Secretary of the Transcaucasian party. Kartvelashvili retorted: "I refuse to work with that charlatan!"

That remark ended Kartvelishvili's career in Georgia. He was removed from office on 31 October, and appointed Second Secretary of the regional party committee of Western Siberia, 1931–33, and First Secretary in the Far East, in 1933–36. He was removed from this post in December 1936, early in Great Purge, and appointed to the lesser post of First Secretary of the District Committee of the CPSU in the Crimea.

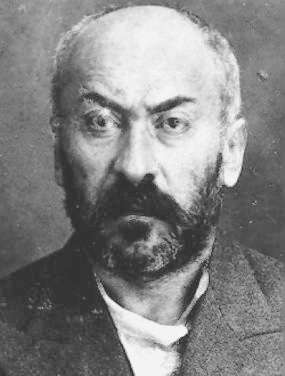
Lavrenty Kartvelishvili after arrest by NKVD, 1937

On 29 June 1937, Kartvelishvili was arrested by the NKVD at the request of Pavel Postyshev, accused of espionage for Germany, Japan, Great Britain and other foreign powers, participation in a conspiracy to overthrow Soviet power and the murder of Stalin, Nikolai Yezhov, head of the NKVD, and other party and state leaders. In August, he was taken to Moscow.

On 21 October, his name was included on a death list sent to Stalin, who crossed it off, which probably means that Stalin wanted him to be broken down so that he could appear as a defendant at a show trial, as was the case with Isaac Zelensky, whose name was crossed off the same list. During an official soviet inquiry into the abuses of the 1930s, conducted in 1956, it was reported that Kartvelishvili was tortured so severely that he was unable to walk. His name appeared on a second death list, signed by Yezhov in August 1938.

Sentenced to death by the Military College of the Supreme Court of the USSR, he was executed in Kommunarka on 22 August 1938.

He was posthumously 'rehabilitated' and restored to membership of the communist party in February 1956.

Kartvelishvili's wife, Olga, was arrested on 28 September 1937, and sentenced to five years in the gulag. She was 'rehabilitated' on 22 March 1956.
