= Mamia Orakhelashvili =

Georgian Bolshevik and Soviet politician

- მამია ორახელაშვილი
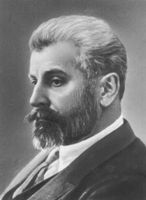
- Orakhelashvili in 1921

First Secretary of the Communist Party of Georgia
- In office 20 May 1920 – April 1922
- Preceded by: Position established
- Succeeded by: Mikheil Okujava

First Secretary of the Communist Party of the Transcaucasian SFSR
- In office 12 August 1926 – 27 November 1929
- Preceded by: Sergo Ordzhonikidze
- Succeeded by: Alexander Krinitsky

Personal details
- Born: June 10, 1881 Kutais Governorate, Russian Empire
- Died: November 11, 1937 (aged 56) Russian SFSR, Soviet Union
- Party: RSDLP (Bolsheviks) (1903–1918); Russian Communist Party (1918–1932)
- Other political affiliations: Communist Party of Georgia
- Spouse: Maria Orakhelashvili
- Profession: Doctor

Mamia Orakhelashvili (Georgian: მამია ორახელაშვილი, Russian: Иван (Мамия) Дмитриевич Орахелашвили, Ivan (Mamia) Dmitrievich Orakhelashvili; June 10, 1881 – December 11, 1937) was a Georgian Bolshevik and Soviet politician.

== Early life and career ==
Born in the Kutais Governorate, Imperial Russia (in present-day Georgia) in the family of a landlord, Orakhelashvili studied medicine at the University of Kharkov and St. Petersburg Military Medical Academy. He joined the Bolshevik faction of the Russian Social Democratic Labour Party in 1903 and took an active part in the 1905 uprising in Petersburg. Between 1906 and 1914 he was arrested by the Tsarist police several times.

== Russian Revolution ==
After the 1917 Bolshevik seizure of power, Orakhelashvili chaired the Vladikavkaz Soviet. Between 1918 and 1920 he worked in the underground Bolshevik group in the Democratic Republic of Georgia, and was arrested by the Georgian government. He was released in accordance to the Moscow Treaty between Georgia and Soviet Russia (May 1920) and became chairman of the recently legalized Georgian Communist party. In February 1921, he participated in a Bolshevik diversion in southern Georgia, which was used by Vladimir Lenin's government as a pretext for the Red Army invasion of Georgia. He provided the preface to Тайны меньшевистского царства (Secrets of Menshevik Georgia) by Iakov Moiseyevich Shafir (1921) in which archival material was used to justify the Soviet invasion.

== In Soviet Georgia ==
After the Sovietization of Georgia, Orakhelashvili was one of the most influential Soviet officials in the Caucasus. He served as chairman of the Georgian Revkom and secretary of the Central Committee of the Georgian Communist Party. He later became deputy chairman of the Georgian Council of People's Commissars and chairman of the Transcaucasian SFSR Council of People's Commissars. In 1923–1926, he served as deputy chairman of the USSR Council of People's Commissars. In 1926–29, he succeeded his long time friend and ally Sergo Ordzhonikidze as First Secretary of the kraikom (territorial committee) of the Transcaucasian communist party. In 1930–31, Orakhelashvili joined the editorial board of the Communist Party newspaper Pravda.

Orakhelashvili was reinstated in his former post of First Secretary of the Transcaucasian Party Committee on On 31 October 1931, in place of Lavrenty Kartvelishvili, who had clashed with Lavrentiy Beria. When Stalin proposed that Beria be appointed as second secretary on the same day, Orakhelashvili reputedly exclaimed: "Koba, what did you say? Maybe I misheard. We can't spring a surprise like that on the party!" The two of them became involved in a feud, which also involved Orakhelashvili's wife, Maria, who was Georgia's People's Commissar for Education. On 10 June 1937, she was accused of 'factional activity' and 'spreading false rumours' and was reprimanded and dismissed. Orakhelashvili then wrote to Sergo Ordzhonikidze, and to Stalin, complaining about Beria, and asking to be allowed to resign. Stalin refused the request, though he ruled that Orakhelashvili was in the wrong, but changed his mind later. Orakhelashvili 'resigned' and was replaced by Beria on 9 October 1932.

In 1932, he was appointed a deputy director of the Marx-Engels-Lenin Institute and authored several works on Communist Party history and Bolshevik activities in Transcaucasia and Georgia. His historic descriptions of the period in question did not particularly meet the Stalinist version of the events.

During the run-up to the 17th Communist Party conference, in February 1934, Orakhelashvili was one of the leaders of a group of middle-ranking officials who met to discuss trying to remove Stalin from his post as General Secretary, and appointing Sergei Kirov in his place. His main motive is assumed to have been his objection to the rise of Beria. He may also have been insulted by an occasion when Stalin was on holiday in Tiflis in May 1926, and sang an obscene Georgian song in mixed company that included Maria Orakhelashvili.

Orakhelashvili was arrested on 26 June 1937, during the Great Purge, and accused of espionage, sabotage, and plotting to assassinate leading communist in Georgia. While he was in prison in Georgia and being tortured, to force him to confess, his ear drums were perforated. On 20 July, Beria sent Stalin a note saying that, while other Georgians had 'confessed' to spying and other seditious activity (probably under torture):

This scoundrel and traitor Mamia Orakhelashvili is still silent. We are afraid to take him into work, because every time during interrogation he faints and we have to inject him with camphor. There is no doubt that he will speak soon too...

He was executed on 11 December 1937.

Maria Orakhelashvili (1887–1937) was arrested on 28 June 1937, tortured, and shot in prison on 17 September. Their daughter, Ketevan, was sent to a Gulag camp, and her husband, the prominent conductor Evgeni Mikeladze, tortured to death.

The Orakhelashvilis were rehabilitated in 1955. In November 1955, eight former Georgian NKVD officers went on trial in Tbilisi, accused, among other crimes, of 'terroristic acts of violence' against Mamia and Maria Orakhelashvili, on Beria's orders. Eight were executed, the other two given long prison sentences.
