= Kandid Charkviani =

Georgian party and government official

Kandid (Candide) Charkviani
- კანდიდ ჩარკვიანი

First Secretary of the Georgian Communist Party
- In office 31 August 1938 – 2 April 1952
- Preceded by: Lavrenti Beria
- Succeeded by: Akaki Mgeladze

Personal details
- Born: 12 February 1907 Tsageri, Kutais Governorate, Russian Empire
- Died: 13 September 1994 (aged 87) Tbilisi, Georgia
- Party: Communist Party of the Soviet Union

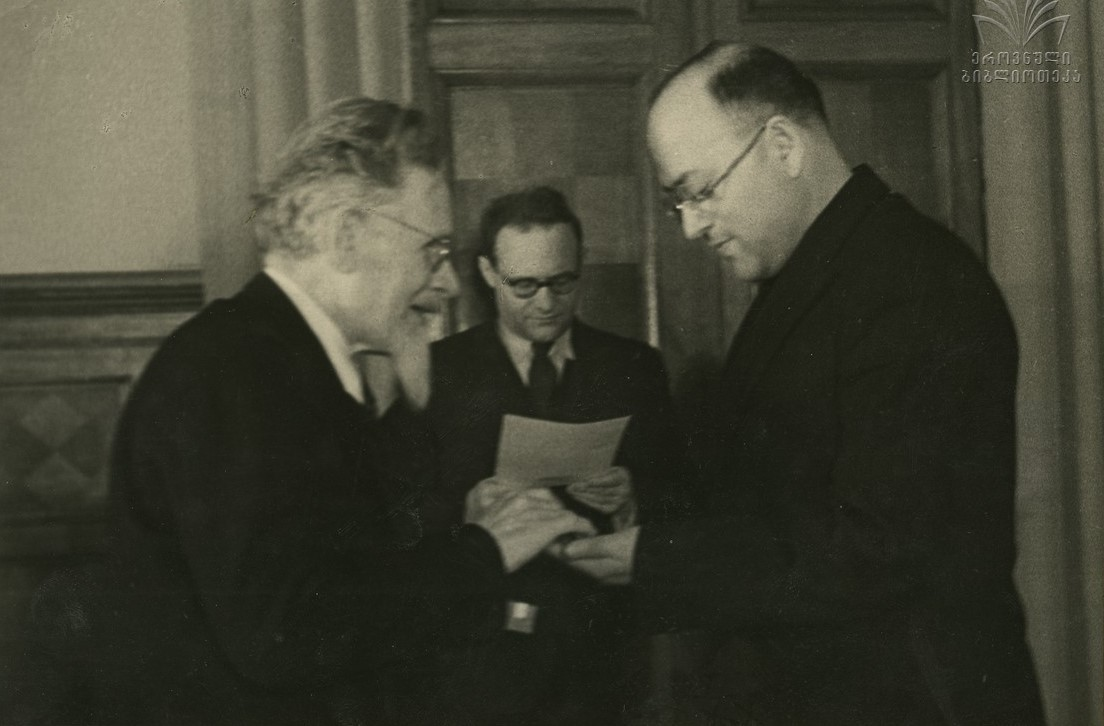
Charkviani (right) with Mikhail Kalinin, 1944

Kandid Charkviani (Georgian: კანდიდ ჩარკვიანი, Russian: Кандид Несторович Чарквиани; 12 February 1907 – 13 September 1994) was a Georgian party and government official, and First Secretary of the Communist Party of Georgia from 1938 to 1952.

== Early life ==
Born in the Tsageri, Lechkhumi region of Georgia. Charkviani graduated from Kutaisi Gymnasium and Tbilisi Engineering Institute. He began his career working for several publications, including major Georgian newspapers.

Charkviani rose to the position of First Secretary of the Georgian SSR through support of Joseph Stalin. Yet Charkviani's promotion was met with strong resistance from Lavrenti Beria, who had been planning to find a replacement for this position amongst his own protégés. However, Stalin made the choice in favour of the young Charkviani (then 32).

== Stalin's choice 1937–1938 ==
Stalin first learned of Charkviani by reading his articles in the Georgian newspapers. Stalin was appreciative of Charkviani's literary talent so he encouraged the promotion of the youth. Charkviani was appointed Head of the Department of Education and Culture at the Central Committee of the Communist Party of Georgia. In September of the same year he assumed his duties as First Secretary of Georgia's Writer's Union. In this post he made a major contribution to the preparation of an important literary event – the commemoration of the 750th anniversary of "The Knight in the Panther's Skin", a classic poem by 12th century Georgian poet Shota Rustaveli. On 31 August 1938 he was elected as First Secretary of the Central Committee of the Communist Party of Georgia. He remained in this post until April 1952.

== Character ==
Geronti Kikodze, a prominent 20th century Georgian literary critic and thinker, in his memoirs secretly written in 1954, while harshly criticizing the Communist regime and its leaders, distinguishes Kandid Charkviani for his humane qualities and strong administrative skills: "Charkviani did not lack compassion, he was not easily convinced by informers, and overall, he was a balanced and modest man. In general, Charkviani was rather rational in handling the affairs of the republic." (p. 46)

Kikodze is illustrative of the tensions existing between Charkviani and Beria's people who worked in the Georgian Intelligence Services. He cites an example when, after the Second World War, supposedly on the orders of Beria, who had a personal grudge against Kikodze, Beria's protégés in the Georgian NKVD fabricated charges against him accusing him of having links with Nazi Germany. Kikodze writes that through the interference of Charkviani, the charges against him were lifted (pp 48–50).

== Georgian achievements 1938–1950 ==
Charkviani presided over the rapid industrialization of Georgia. On his initiative in the post-war years several major projects were implemented despite the resistance on the part of various officials in Moscow bureaucracy. Among them were the Rustavi Metal Works and the town of Rustavi. The original plan supported by Stalin was to build the facility within the boundaries of the capital city Tbilisi. It was on the insistence of Charkviani, who gave priority to environmental considerations, that the plan was altered and eventually, the new town of Rustavi was built along the large scale metallurgical plant. Other projects included the Automobile Plant in Kutaisi (the second largest city in Georgia), man-made water reservoir ("The Tbilisi Sea"), Tbilisi Subway (Metro) which despite many artificially caused delays was ultimately completed in 1965, as well as dozens of small-scale hydro power stations in various provinces.

The complexities of the period were largely due to the Second World War and post-war reconstruction. Charkviani was highly instrumental in organizing the production of weaponry and heavy military equipment (fighter planes, etc.) in Georgia. Throughout World War II Georgia also supplied to the front large amounts of agricultural products. During this period the production increased significantly.

As early as 1941 on Charkviani's initiative after overcoming serious hurdles erected by certain high-ranking Moscow bureaucrats, it became possible to establish Academy of Sciences of Georgia, which later on came to control a few dozen Research Centers.

"During his rule Candide Charkviani initiated profound changes that further transformed the Georgian republic altogether," writes Kikodze (p. 46) and emphasizes the success of Charkviani in reinforcing Georgian national identity: "[Apart from developing the Georgian economy at an unprecedented pace] these changes... contributed to the eradication of old provincial isolation within Georgia and strengthened one common national identity [among Georgians]" (pp. 46–47).

== The Mingrelian Affair and exile 1952–1958 ==
Charkviani was accused during the Mingrelian Affair (1952), a conspiracy aimed against Lavrenti Beria's protégés in Georgia. For years historians erroneously thought that Candide Charkviani was Mingrelian and that he was punished because of his links with Beria. However, the newly opened archives in Georgia provide evidence that Charkviani, who was Lechkhumian (from the Lechkhumi region of Georgia) and not Mingrelian or Svan, was accused because he allegedly failed to "detect and repress the criminal nationalist ring of counter revolutionaries within the ranks of the Georgian Communist Party". Moreover, it has emerged that Charkviani's relations with Beria had never been smooth and that Beria tolerated Charkviani only because the latter was supported by Stalin.

As a result of Mingrelian Affair, in April 1952 Charkviani was demoted to a minor position at the Central Committee in Moscow. Immediately following Stalin's death, all Beria's clients who suffered during the Mingrelian Affair were restored. Yet Charkviani, on Beria's orders, was separated from his family and moved to Central Asia where in 1953-1958 he managed a state construction company in Tashkent. In 1958 he was finally allowed to return to Georgia.

== Later years ==
Back in Tbilisi, Charkviani began his research work at the Institute of Economics and Law. He defended his Candidate and Doctor's Dissertations, and in 1981 he was appointed as Director of the Research Institute of People's Economy and Economic Planning, where he worked until 1988.

Charkviani was the author of 40 research papers and monographs pertaining to wine-making, development of the electrical energy sector and other fields of economy. He also translated German poetry into Georgian, including poems by Heinrich Heine and Johann Wolfgang von Goethe.

His complete book of memoirs was published in 2004.

Kandid Charkviani was married to Tamar Jaoshvili, an ophthalmologist, for 60 years. They had three sons: Merab, Giorgi and Gela. One of his sons, Gela Charkviani, was the Georgian ambassador to the United Kingdom and Ireland. Kandid Charkviani's grandson was Irakli Charkviani, an influential Georgian musician and writer.

Party political offices
Preceded by Lavrentiy Beria	First Secretary of the Georgian Communist Party; 1938–1952	Succeeded by Akaki Mgeladze
