= Geri, Georgia =

Geri გერი (Georgian) Джер (Iron Ossetic)
- Interactive map of Geri
- Location within South Ossetia Location within Shida Kartli Location within Georgia
- Coordinates: 42°21′17″N 44°02′05″E
- Country: South Ossetia (de facto); Georgia (de jure)
- Mkhare: Shida Kartli
- Elevation: 1,480 m (4,860 ft)

Population (2014)
  - Total: 35
- Time zone: UTC+3 (Moscow time)
  - Summer (DST): UTC+4 (Moscow summer time)

Geri (Georgian: გერი; Iron Ossetic: Джер) is a village in the Gori Municipality of Shida Kartli in central Georgia, and in the Tskhinvali District of South Ossetia.
