= Samson Mamulia =

Georgian Soviet politician

Samson Mamulia (Georgian: სამსონ მამულია; Russian: Самсон Мамулия; 1892–1937) was a Georgian Soviet politician and the First Secretary of the Georgian Communist Party from November 20, 1930 to October 13, 1931.

In June 1937 he was imprisoned on the orders of Joseph Stalin in Tbilisi a month after his son's birth. Samson Mamulia was executed and his wife died in the Gulag. His son Guram Mamulia (May 9, 1937 – January 1, 2003) was an activist for Meskhetian rights.
