= Declaration of State Sovereignty of Georgia =

1990 document signed by the Supreme Soviet of the Georgian SSR

On Guarantees of Protection of State Sovereignty of Georgia
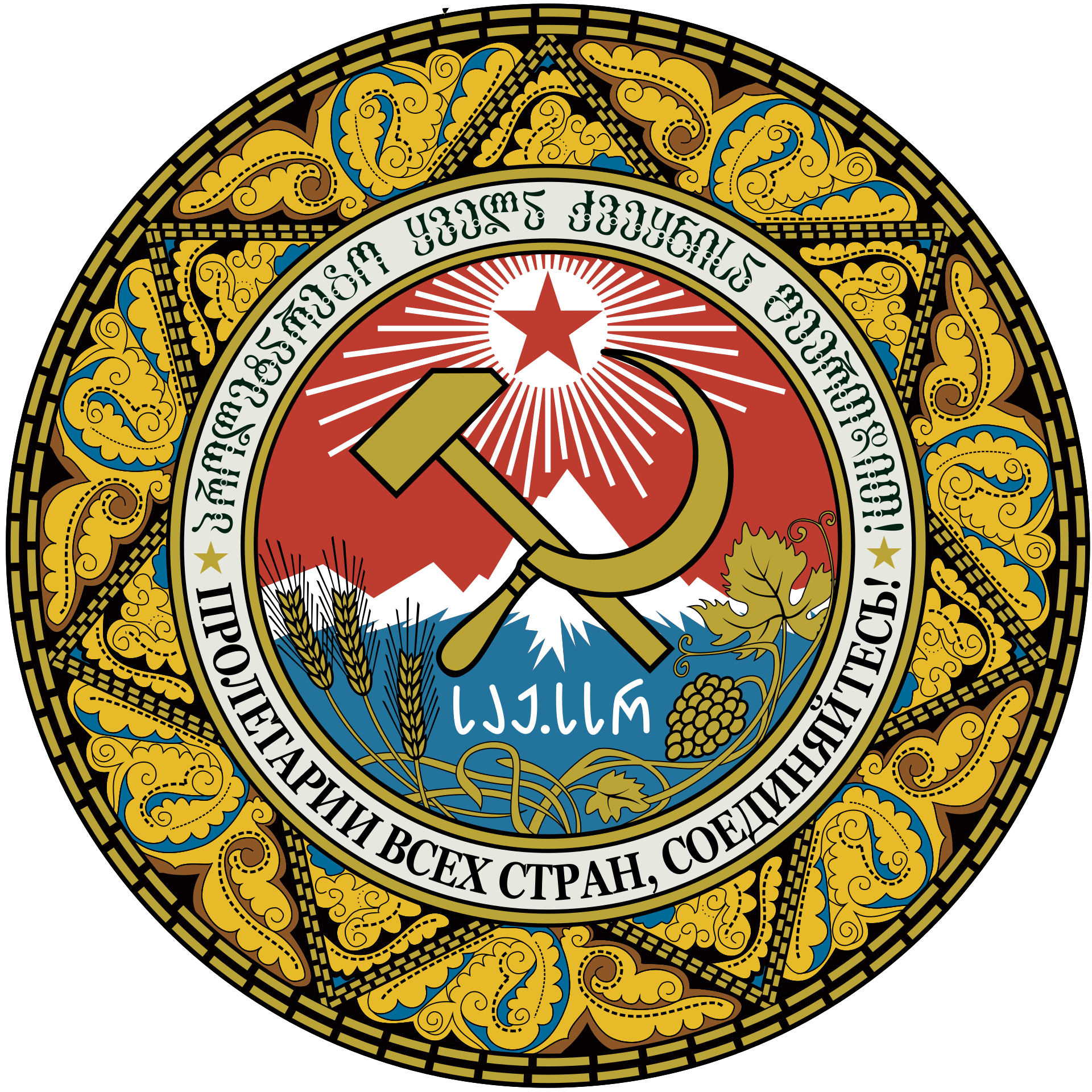
- Created: 9 March 1990
- Signatories: Members of the Supreme Soviet of the Georgian Soviet Socialist Republic
- Purpose: Assert Georgia's sovereignty and expand one's rights within the reformed Soviet Union; Create a basis for the Georgian independence

The Resolution of the Georgian Supreme Soviet on On Guarantees of Protection of State Sovereignty of Georgia (Georgian: საქართველოს სახელმწიფო სუვერენიტეტის დაცვის გარანტიების შესახებ; Russian: О гарантиях защиты государственного суверенитета Грузии) was passed by the 11th convocation of the Supreme Soviet of the Georgian Soviet Socialist Republic during a special session held on 9 March 1990. It declared the 1921 invasion and occupation of Democratic Republic of Georgia by the Red Army to be illegal. The resolution denounced the annexation and several other treaties including the formation of the Transcaucasian Federation and deemed the Union Treaty illegal with regard to Georgia. It also reaffirmed Georgia’s rights under the Treaty of Moscow in 1920 and followed amendments passed in November 1989 that granted the republic authority to veto all-Union laws.

== Background ==
In 1985, the new Soviet leader Mikhail Gorbachev launched his Perestroika programme to reform the Soviet Union. In response, many Soviet republics began asserting their rights within the emerging political order. The Estonian SSR was the first to declare state sovereignty within the USSR, doing so on 16 November 1988. In its resolution "On Union Treaty", it called for a New Union Treaty based on Estonia's state sovereignty. The other constituent republics followed the steps soon.

Furthermore, Gorbachev's Glasnost reforms fueled growing demands for complete independence from the Soviet Union, including in the Georgian SSR. Beginning in 1988, the pro-independence opposition organized mass rallies across Georgian cities. In November 1988, the opposition mobilized some 200,000 people in Tbilisi to protest a new Soviet law that granted the Congress of People's Deputies of the Soviet Union the power to enact laws overriding republican legislation. The demonstrations continued and culminated on 9 April 1989, when Soviet troops dispersed a mass protest in Tbilisi, killing several people.

The violent events in Tbilisi further discredited the Soviet authorities among Georgians and increased support for independence. In response, the central Soviet government carried out a cabinet reshuffle in the republic's leadership, replacing its head, Jumber Patiashvili, with Givi Gumbaridze. The new leadership, unlike Patiashvili's, adopted a more conciliatory approach toward the independence movement. After the April 9 tragedy in Tbilisi, the Georgian independence movement intensified and compelled the local Soviet authorities to make concessions to national forces. As part of these changes, the Supreme Soviet of the Georgian SSR adopted a series of measures aimed at reasserting sovereignty. On 20 June 1989, the Supreme Soviet agreed to the opposition's demand to establish a commission to provide a legal and political assessment of the violation of the 1920 Russia–Georgia Treaty, which had guaranteed Georgia's independence from Russia, referring to the 1921 Red Army invasion of Georgia. The commission's report was presented to the Supreme Soviet and approved on 18 November 1989. The resolution raised the issue with the Congress of People’s Deputies of the USSR, though it received no response. On the same day, it also approved constitutional amendments that granted the republic the right to veto legislation issued by All-Union bodies and affirmed that Georgia's natural resources were the property of the republic itself.

The Supreme Soviet of the Georgian SSR gradually advanced measures to assert republican sovereignty within the Soviet framework. These measures reflected both the broader dynamics of perestroika and a growing national movement in Georgia that sought to reverse the political consequences of the Sovietization of 1921. In February 1990, the Georgian Supreme Soviet adopted a new programme incorporating many of the demands of the pro-independence opposition. It called for complete political, cultural, and economic self-determination and a New Union Treaty granting the constituent republics "full sovereignty", leaving the central Soviet authorities only a limited role in defense, foreign policy, and "the most important problems of the whole country." The programme also called for all property on Georgian territory to belong to the republic, either to remain under state control or to be transferred into private or other forms of ownership, with the partial exception of defense enterprises, which, while under republican jurisdiction, could be managed by the central government "on a contractual basis." It also advocated for Georgian diplomatic representation abroad, membership in the United Nations, and the establishment of Georgian national military units.

== History ==
On 8 March, a massive demonstration was held in front of the government building in Tbilisi against the USSR Supreme Soviet's decision to grant new presidential powers to Mikhail Gorbachev. The demonstrators also demanded that the republican leadership officially declare Georgia occupied and illegally annexed. In response to the protests, on 9 March 1990, the 11th convocation of the Supreme Council, led by Chairman of the Presidium Givi Gumbaridze, adopted the resolution "On Guarantees for the Protection of the State Sovereignty of Georgia". The resolution explicitly addressed the historical and legal aspects of Georgia's incorporation into the Soviet Union. It declared that, from a legal perspective, the entry of Soviet Russian forces into Georgia in February 1921 constituted military aggression and occupation and, from a political perspective, annexation. It therefore recognized the incorporation of Georgia into the Soviet Union as a violation of the Treaty of Moscow, under which Georgia's independence had been established under international law. The same body also declared, in line with this interpretation, annulled the subsequent legal acts that formalized Georgia's Sovietization, declaring void the Treaty of 21 May 1921 between the Georgian SSR and the Russian Soviet Federative Socialist Republic, the Treaty on the creation of the Transcaucasian Soviet Federative Socialist Republic, and the Union Treaty that established the Soviet Union.

== Resolution ==
The resolution criticized the draft law on the President of the Soviet Union and called for greater sovereignty for the Georgian SSR. Its main provisions were:

- The Georgian Supreme Soviet supports reforms of the Soviet Union aimed at democratization and increasing the economic and political sovereignty of the constituent republics.
- The constituent republics are sovereign republics under Article 70 of the Soviet Constitution.
- In the event of the establishment of a presidency of the USSR, Georgia, as a sovereign state, should have its own president.
- The President of the Soviet Union should not impede the right of the constituent republics to secede on the pretext of safeguarding the territorial integrity of the Union.
- The Union Treaty, as the instrument regulating relations between the union republics, can not be replaced by a constitution adopted by the Congress of People's Deputies.
- Normative acts issued by the President of the Soviet Union cannot have legal force throughout the USSR without the approval of the Supreme Soviet of the relevant republic.
- Constitutional amendments granting the President of the Soviet Union the right to declare war or a state of emergency, as well as to exercise unilateral presidential rule, are deemed unacceptable, as such measures could threaten the sovereignty of the constituent republics.
- Decrees issued by the President of the Soviet Union should be implemented within a constituent republic only with the approval of its Supreme Soviet.
- Based on the report of the commission tasked with providing a political and legal assessment of the violation of the 1920 Russia–Georgia Treaty, the 1921 Soviet invasion of Georgia is declared, from a legal perspective, a military intervention and occupation aimed at overthrowing the existing political order and, from a political perspective, a de facto annexation.
- Condemning the occupation and de facto annexation of Georgia by Soviet Russia as an international crime, the Supreme Soviet of Georgia seeks the annulment of the consequences of the violation of the 1920 Russia–Georgia Treaty and the restoration of Georgia's rights recognized by Soviet Russia.
- The 1921 Russia–Georgia Treaty, the 1922 Treaty on the Creation of the Transcaucasian Socialist Federative Soviet Republic and the 1922 Union Treaty on the Creation of the Soviet Union are declared invalid.
- Since the 1922 Union Treaty is declared invalid, negotiations are to begin on the restoration of the independent Georgian state.

== Aftermath ==
By adopting this position, the Supreme Council not only rejected the legitimacy of Georgia’s Soviet-era political structures but also laid a legal foundation for the republic’s claim to restore the independence first declared in 1918, situating Georgia’s stance alongside the independence initiatives emerging in the Baltic republics at the same time. The adoption of the 9 March 1990 sovereignty resolution, followed by subsequent acts, set Georgia firmly on the path toward independence but also exposed the country to significant challenges. The resolutions of 1990 were soon followed by the multi-party elections of October 1990, in which the Communist Party was defeated and the Round Table—Free Georgia coalition led by Zviad Gamsakhurdia secured victory, legitimizing itself as the legal successor of the Democratic Republic of Georgia rather than the Georgian SSR. A referendum held on 31 March 1991 produced an overwhelming vote in favor of restoring independence on the basis of the 1918 Act, with 90.3% of the electorate participating and 98.9% supporting the measure. On 9 April 1991, the Supreme Council formally adopted the Act of Restoration of the State Independence of Georgia, symbolically linking the declaration to the victims of 9 April 1989 and proclaiming Georgia the successor of the interwar Georgian state. However, while the act marked the legal restoration of sovereignty, the subsequent period was marred by deep political instability, ethnic conflicts in Abkhazia and South Ossetia, and a deficit of legitimacy in state institutions. The confrontation between Gamsakhurdia and opposition groups escalated into armed conflict by late 1991, culminating in his overthrow by a military council in January 1992, while civil war and separatist conflicts persisted until the mid-1990s.
