= Givi Gumbaridze =

Soviet Georgian politician

- გივი გუმბარიძე

First Secretary of the Georgian Communist Party
- In office 14 April 1989 – 7 December 1990
- Preceded by: Jumber Patiashvili
- Succeeded by: Avtandil Margiani

Chairman of the Presidium of the Supreme Soviet of the Georgian SSR
- In office 15 November 1989 – 17 November 1990
- Preceded by: Otar Circassia
- Succeeded by: Office abolished

Chairman of the Committee for State Security of the Georgian SSR
- In office 2 December 1988 – 15 April 1989
- Preceded by: Aleksi Inauri
- Succeeded by: Tariel Lordkipanidze

Personal details
- Born: 22 March 1945 (age 81) Tbilisi, Georgian SSR, Soviet Union
- Party: Communist Party of the Soviet Union

Military service
- Allegiance: Soviet Union
- Branch/service: Soviet Army; KGB
- Years of service: 1966–1967; 1988–1989
- Rank: Colonel

Givi Gumbaridze (Georgian: გივი გუმბარიძე; Russian: Ги́ви Григо́рьевич Гумбари́дзе; born 22 March 1945) is a Georgian politician who served as First Secretary of the Georgian Communist Party from 1989 to 1990 and as head of state of the Georgian Soviet Socialist Republic. Prior to that, he served as the head of the Georgian KGB.

== Early life ==
Givi Gumbaridze was born in Tbilisi, Georgian Soviet Socialist Republic, on 22 March 1945. He graduated from the Tbilisi State University in 1966.

== Career ==
Gumbaridze was a senior researcher at the Central State Archive from 1966 to 1969. He was a translator for the Presidium of the Supreme Soviet of the Georgian Soviet Socialist Republic from 1969 to 1977. He was instructor of the Central Committee of the Communist Party of Georgia from 1977 to 1983. Gumbaridze was first secretary of the Zestaponi District Committee and the Tbilisi City Committee. Gumbaridze was chief of the Georgian KGB.

Jumber Patiashvili resigned as First Secretary of the Communist Party on 14 April 1989, due to the Massacre of Tbilisi and was replaced by Gumbaridze. The Communist Party only won 95 of 250 seats of the Supreme Soviet of the Georgian Soviet Socialist Republic in the 1990 election while Round Table—Free Georgia won a majority. All of the parties running in the election, including the communists, supported Georgian independence and switching to a market economy. Gumbaridze said in an interview to Komunisti that Georgian independence was "the highest aim of the Communist Party of Georgia". He was a member of the Supreme Council of the Republic of Georgia from the Khelvachauri electoral district.

== Awards ==
The Order of the Badge of Honour was given to Gumbaridze in 1986.

== Works cited ==
=== Books ===
- Jones, Stephen (2013), Georgia: A Political History Since Independence, London: I.B. Taurus, ISBN 978-1-78453-085-3
- Odom, William (1998). The Collapse of the Soviet Military. Yale University Press. ISBN 0300074697.

=== Journals ===
- Nelson, Lynn; Amonashvili, Paata (1992). "Voting and Political Attitudes in Soviet Georgia". Soviet Studies. 44 (2). Taylor & Francis: 687–697. doi:10.32350/152203. JSTOR 152203.

=== News ===
- Worrall, Nick (6 November 1990). "Nationalists Take Power in Georgia". The Christian Science Monitor. Archived from the original on 14 November 2026.

=== Web ===
- გივი გუმბარიძე [Givi Gumbaridze] (in Georgian). National Library of Georgia. Archived from the original on 10 July 2022.

Party political offices
Preceded by Jumber Patiashvili	First Secretary of the Georgian Communist Party; 1989–1990	Succeeded by Avtandil Margiani
