= Nodar Natadze =

Georgian politician (1929–2022)

Nodar Natadze (Georgian: ნოდარ ნათაძე; 27 May 1929 – 13 November 2022) was a Georgian literary critic, linguist, and politician, best known as the continuous leader of Popular Front – one of the oldest political groups founded in the last years of Soviet Georgia – since its inception in 1989.

== Biography ==
Born in Tbilisi, the capital of then-Soviet Georgia in 1929, Natadze graduated from the Faculty of Philology of the Tbilisi State University with a degree in the Georgian Language and Literature in 1952 and did his postgraduate work at the Chikobava Institute of Linguistics of the Georgian National Academy of Sciences (GNAS) through to 1955. He subsequently worked for the Institute of Linguistics from 1956 to 1969, when he joined the Institute of Philosophy of the GNAS. He authored several works on Georgian literature, including the medieval epic poet Shota Rustaveli, as well as Thomas Aquinas and the problems of national culture.

In the late 1980s, Nodar Natadze became involved in a national movement seeking independence from the Soviet Union. In July 1989, he became a founding member and chairman of the political group Popular Front, which called for independence and a gradual transition to a market economy fearing it would lead to foreign firms seizing Georgian national resources. At that time, Natadze was close to Zviad Gamsakhurdia, a radical pro-independence leader, who supported his election to the chairmanship of the Popular Front. In August 1989, through the efforts of the influential group of intellectuals DASi (Democratic Choice for Georgia), Natadze was elected to the Supreme Soviet of the Georgian SSR as a member of the anti-Communist opposition. In Georgia's first multi-party legislative election in 1990, Natadze succeeded in securing a seat in the Supreme Soviet in a single-mandate constituency despite his party gaining only 1.9% of the vote. He, thus, became one of the signatories of Georgia's declaration of independence on 9 April 1991. By that time, he had withdrawn to opposition to Gamsakhurdia, who was elected as President of Georgia on 26 May 1991. Natadze also ran for the presidency, garnering 1.17% of the vote and ending up fourth. Subsequently, Natadze accused Gamsakhurdia of usurping the powers of parliament, censoring media, and violating the election law.

After Gamsakhurdia was ousted in a military coup in January 1992, Natadze was a member of the newly convened Parliament of Georgia on a party ticket of the election bloc Eleventh of October from 1992 to 1995. He played no major role in the politics of Georgia afterward. Natadze died on 13 November 2022, at the age of 93.
