= Chairperson of the Presidium of the Supreme Soviet of the Georgian Soviet Socialist Republic =

The Chairperson of the Presidium of the Supreme Soviet of the Georgian Soviet Socialist Republic was the nominal head of state of Soviet Georgia, which existed between 25 February 1921 and 9 April 1991. It succeeded the office of Chairman of the All-Georgian Central Executive Committee. Below is a table of the Chairperson of the Presidium of the Supreme Soviet of the Georgian SSR.

No.	Picture	Name (Birth–Death)	Took office	Left office	Political party
Chairperson of the Presidium of the Supreme Soviet
1		Filipp Makharadze (1868–1941)	10 July 1938	10 December 1941	CPSU
2		Georgy Sturua (1884–1956)	3 January 1942	26 March 1948	CPSU
3		Vasily Gogua (1908–1967)	26 March 1948	6 April 1952	CPSU
4		Zakhary Chkhubianishvili (1903–1980)	6 April 1952	15 April 1953	CPSU
5		Vladimir Tskhovrebashvili (1905–1977)	15 April 1953	29 October 1953	CPSU
6		Miron Chubinidze (1905–1980)	29 October 1953	17 April 1959	CPSU
7		Giorgi Dzotsenidze (1910–1976)	18 April 1959	26 January 1976	CPSU
8		Pavel Gilashvili (1918–1994)	26 January 1976	29 March 1989	CPSU
9		Otar Circassia (1933–2004)	29 March 1989	17 November 1989	CPSU
10		Givi Gumbaridze (born 1945)	17 November 1989	14 November 1990	CPSU

On 14 November 1990 the Presidium of the Supreme Soviet was abolished. The position of head of state went to the Chairman of the Supreme Council of the Republic of Georgia, Zviad Gamsakhurdia.

== See also ==
- Supreme Soviet of the Georgian Soviet Socialist Republic
- Chairperson of the Supreme Soviet of the Georgia Soviet Socialist Republic
- List of leaders of Georgia (country)

== Sources ==
- World Statesmen.org: Georgia
