= Giorgi Dzotsenidze =

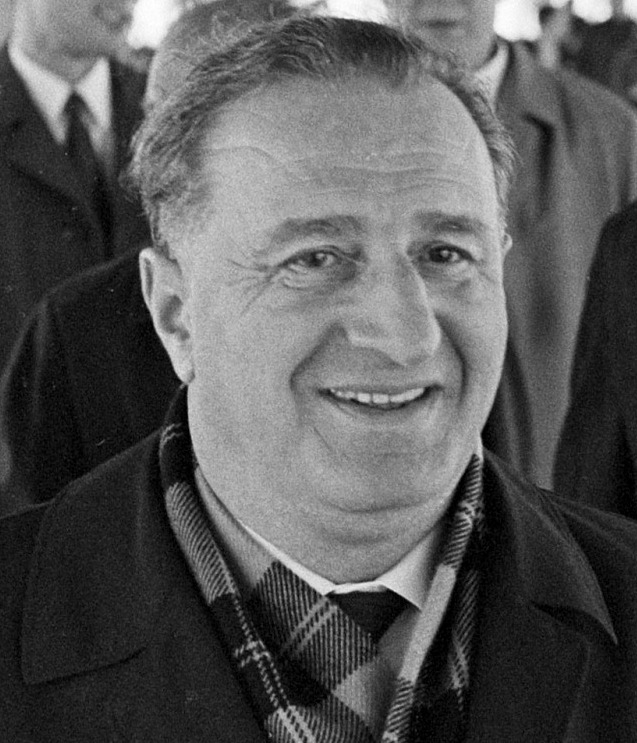
- Born: 10 February 1910; Kutaisi, Kutais Governorate, Russian Empire
- Died: 5 May 1976 (aged 66); Tbilisi, Georgian SSR, Soviet Union
- Education: Tbilisi State University
- Occupations: Geology politician

Giorgi Samsonovich Dzotsenidze (Georgian: გიორგი ძოწენიძე; Russian: Гео́ргий Самсо́нович Дзоцени́дзе; born 10 February 1910 – 5 May 1976) was a Georgian geologist and statesman. As a politician he held the posts of Chairman of the Presidium of the Supreme Soviet of the Georgian Soviet Socialist Republic (1959–1976) and the deputy chairman of the Presidium of the Supreme Soviet (1960–1976). As a scientist, he was Academician of the Academy of Sciences of the USSR and vice-president of the Georgian Academy of Sciences.

Dzotsenidze was born in a peasant family in Kutaisi and graduated from the Tbilisi State University in 1929. In 1933–1934, he briefly headed the department of mineralogy and petrography at the pedagogical institute in Kutaisi, and from 1934 to 1959 held positions of professor, dean and rector (1958–59) of the Tbilisi University. Between 1951 and 1955, he was a secretary, and from 1955 to 1958, he was the first vice-president of the Georgian Academy of Sciences. His scientific works concerned paleovolcanology and the connection between magmatism and tectonics. In particular, he was one of the founders of the theory of volcanogenic-sedimentary lithogenesis.

In 1940, he became member of the Communist Party. In 1959, he was chosen as Chairman of the Presidium of the Supreme Soviet of the Georgian SSR; in 1960, he was appointed as the deputy chairman of the Presidium of the Supreme Soviet. He held these posts until his death in 1976. During his career, he received the State Prize of the USSR (1950), and awarded two Orders of Lenin and the Order of the Red Banner of Labour.
