= Massacre of Tbilisi =

1989 massacre in Tbilisi, Georgian SSR

April 9 Massacre
- Part of Georgian-Abkhaz conflict, Revolutions of 1989, and Dissolution of the Soviet Union
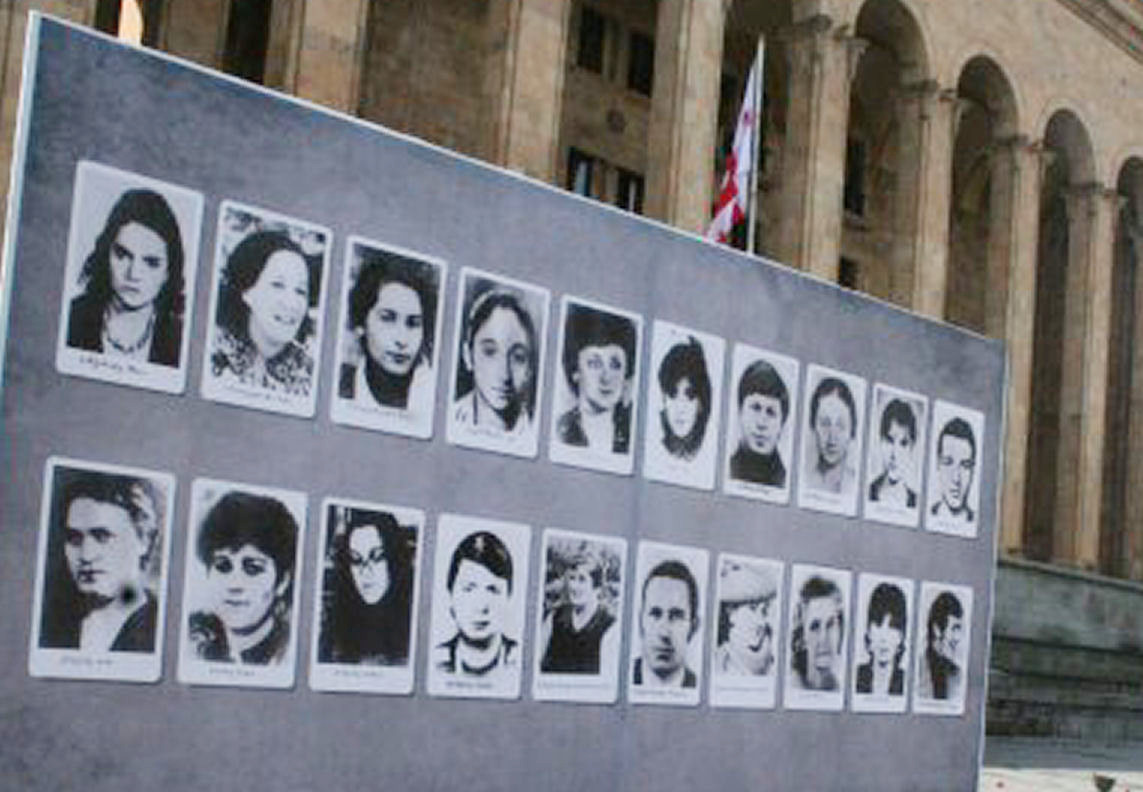
- Photos of the 9 April 1989 massacre victims, mostly young women, on a billboard in Tbilisi (2008)
- Date: 4–9 April 1989
- Location: Tbilisi, Georgian SSR, Soviet Union
- Caused by: Political repression Nationalist sentiment
- Goals: Civil rights; Restoration of Georgian Independence; Opposition to Abkhaz separatism
- Methods: Protest march, picketing, street protesters, Flag waving.
- Result: First multi-party elections, end of communist rule; Restoration of Georgian independence via referendum; Recognition of Georgia’s membership of the Soviet Union as an illegal occupation

Parties
Soviet Union: 4th Motor-Rifle Regiment ODON (Moscow); OMON (Perm and Voronezh); Militsiya Higher School (Gorky); 345th Independent Guards Airborne Regiment	National Democratic Party; All-Georgian Society of St. Ilia the Righteous; Ilia Chavchavadze Society

Lead figures
(Soviet Union) Mikhail Gorbachev (Soviet Union) Igor Rodionov (Georgian Soviet Socialist Republic) Jumber Patiashvili	Merab Kostava Zviad Gamsakhurdia Giorgi Chanturia and others...

Number
2,550 soldiers and law enforcement; 6 BTR (armored personnel carriers); 8 BMD (combat paratrooper carriers); 4 fire engines; 2 ambulance vehicles	8,000–10,000 civilians

Casualties and losses
	Deaths: 21; Injuries: 100+ Arrests: 100+

Massacre of Tbilisi (also known as the Tbilisi tragedy or April 9 Tragedy) refers to the events in Tbilisi, Georgian Soviet Socialist Republic, on 9 April 1989, when a peaceful anti-Soviet, pro-independence and nationalist demonstration was violently dispersed by the Soviet Army, resulting in the deaths of 21 Georgian civilians, with hundreds more injured.

April 9 is now commemorated in Georgia as the National Unity Day (Georgian: ეროვნული ერთიანობის დღე, romanized: erovnuli ertianobis dghe), an annual public holiday.

== Prelude ==
In the Georgian SSR, the anti-Soviet movement grew more active in 1988. Political groups opposed to the Soviet Union organized a number of protests and gatherings in Tbilisi. The conflict between the Soviet government and Georgian nationalists deepened after the so-called Lykhny Assembly on March 18, 1989, when several thousand Abkhaz demanded secession from Georgia and restoration of the Union republic status of 1921–1931. In response, the anti-Soviet groups organized a series of unsanctioned meetings across the republic, claiming that the Soviet government was using Abkhaz separatism in order to oppose the pro-independence movement.

The protests reached their peak on April 4, 1989, when tens of thousands of Georgians gathered before the House of Government on Rustaveli Avenue in Tbilisi. The protesters, led by the Independence Committee (Merab Kostava, Zviad Gamsakhurdia, Giorgi Chanturia, Irakli Bathiashvili, Irakli Tsereteli and others) organized a peaceful demonstration and hunger strikes, demanding the punishment of Abkhaz secessionists and restoration of Georgian independence.

Local Soviet authorities lost control over the situation in the capital and were unable to contain the protests. First Secretary of the Georgian Communist Party Jumber Patiashvili asked USSR leadership to send troops to restore order and impose curfew.

== The demonstrations ==
In the evening of April 8, 1989, Colonel General Igor Rodionov, Commander of the Transcaucasus Military District, ordered his troops to mobilize. Moments before the attack by the Soviet forces, the Patriarch of Georgia Ilia II addressed the demonstrators asking them to leave Rustaveli Avenue and the vicinity of the government building due to the danger which accumulated during the day after appearance of Soviet tanks near the avenue. The demonstrators refused to disband even after the Patriarch's plea. The local Georgian militsiya (police) units were disarmed just before the operation.

On April 9, at 3:45 a.m., Soviet APCs and troops under General Igor Rodionov surrounded the demonstration area. Later, Rodionov claimed in his interview that groups of Georgian militants attacked unarmed soldiers with stones, metal chains and rods. The Soviet troops received an order from General Rodionov to disband and clear the avenue of demonstrators by any means necessary.

The Soviet detachment, armed with military batons and spades (a favorite weapon of Soviet special forces), advanced on demonstrators moving along Rustaveli Avenue. During the advance, the soldiers started to attack demonstrators with spades, inflicting injuries both minor and serious to anyone who was struck.

One of the victims of the attack was a 16-year-old girl who tried to get away from the advancing soldiers, but was chased down and beaten to death near the steps of the government building, receiving blows to the head and chest. She was dragged out of the area by her mother, who was also attacked and wounded. This particularly violent attack was recorded on video from the balcony of a building located on the other side of the avenue. The video was used in the aftermath as evidence during Soviet politician Anatoly Sobchak's Parliamentary commission on investigation of events of April 9, 1989. Groups of Soviet soldiers were reported to chase individual victims, rather than dispersing the crowd.

CN and CS gas were used against the demonstrators; vomiting, respiratory problems and sudden paralyses of the nervous system were reported.

The unarmed police officers attempted to evacuate the panicked group of demonstrators, however a video taken secretly by opposition journalists showed that soldiers did not allow doctors and emergency workers to help the injured people; even ambulances were attacked by the advancing soldiers Captured on film, the image of a young man beating a tank with a stick became a symbol of the Georgian anti-Soviet movement.

== Victims ==
The stampede as people fled from the attack resulted in the death of 19 people, among them 17 women. Autopsies conducted on the victims concluded the direct cause of death of all those who died, with the exception of one case of serious skull and brain injury, was suffocation (asphyxia) caused by both the compression of the body and the inhalation of chemical substances.

On April 11, Georgian TV showed the bodies of the 17 women violently killed, demonstrating alleged brutality by the Soviet soldiers, as the faces of the deceased women were hard to identify due to the facial injuries and blows to the head. The Soviet government blamed the demonstrators for the death of the 20 people, claiming that they had trampled each other while panicking and retreating from the advancing Soviet soldiers. Ironically there was some truth in this, as Soviet troops had blocked all exits from the area except for one narrow passage, which made flight from the area difficult and induced a crowd crush and, possibly, some desperate defensive violence by the trapped demonstrators.

== Investigative reports ==
Official Soviet reports blamed the demonstrators for causing the clash, saying that the troops were attacked with sticks and knives. According to Tass, the soldiers followed orders not to use their weapons, but that extremists attacked them with pieces of metal, bricks and sticks. Tass described the demonstrators as stirring interethnic strife and calling for the overthrow of the Georgian government. General Secretary of the Soviet Communist Party Mikhail Gorbachev slammed "actions by irresponsible persons" for the loss of life. He said that the disturbances sought to overthrow the Georgian government and stir ethnic tension in Georgia. A foreign ministry spokesman said that the clashes were sparked by "die-hard nationalists, extremists and political adventurists who are abusing democratization to the detriment of our new policy of openness and of our very society."

The Presidium of the Supreme Soviet of the Soviet Union created a parliament commission headed by Heorhiy Tarazevych, which supported the government's accusations against demonstrators. Its results were challenged by the Congress of People's Deputies of the Soviet Union, which created its parliamentary commission on investigation of the events of April 9, 1989, in Tbilisi, headed by Anatoly Sobchak and composed of 24 members.

After a full investigation and inquiries, the commission confirmed the government's claim that the deaths had resulted from trampling, but another contributing factor had been the chemical substances used against the demonstrators. It condemned the military, which had caused the deaths by trying to disperse the demonstrators. The commission's report made it more difficult to use military power against demonstrations of civil unrest in the Soviet Union. Sobchak's report presented a detailed account of the violence that was used against the demonstrators and recommended the full prosecution of military personnel responsible for the April 9 event.

== Response ==
On April 10, the Soviet government issued a statement blaming the demonstrators for causing unrest and danger to the safety of the public.

On April 10, in protest against the crackdown, Tbilisi and the rest of Georgia went out on strike and a 40-day period of mourning was declared. People brought massive collections of flowers to the place of the killings. A state of emergency was declared, but demonstrations continued.

The government of the Georgian SSR resigned as a result of the event. Moscow claimed the demonstrators attacked first and the soldiers had to repel them. At the first Congress of People's Deputies (May–June 1989) Mikhail Gorbachev disclaimed all responsibility, shifting blame onto the army. The revelations in the liberal Soviet media, as well as the findings of the "pro-Perestroika" Deputy Anatoly Sobchak's commission of enquiry into the Tbilisi events, reported at the second Congress in December 1989, resulted in embarrassment for the Soviet hardliners and army leadership implicated in the event.

== Legacy ==
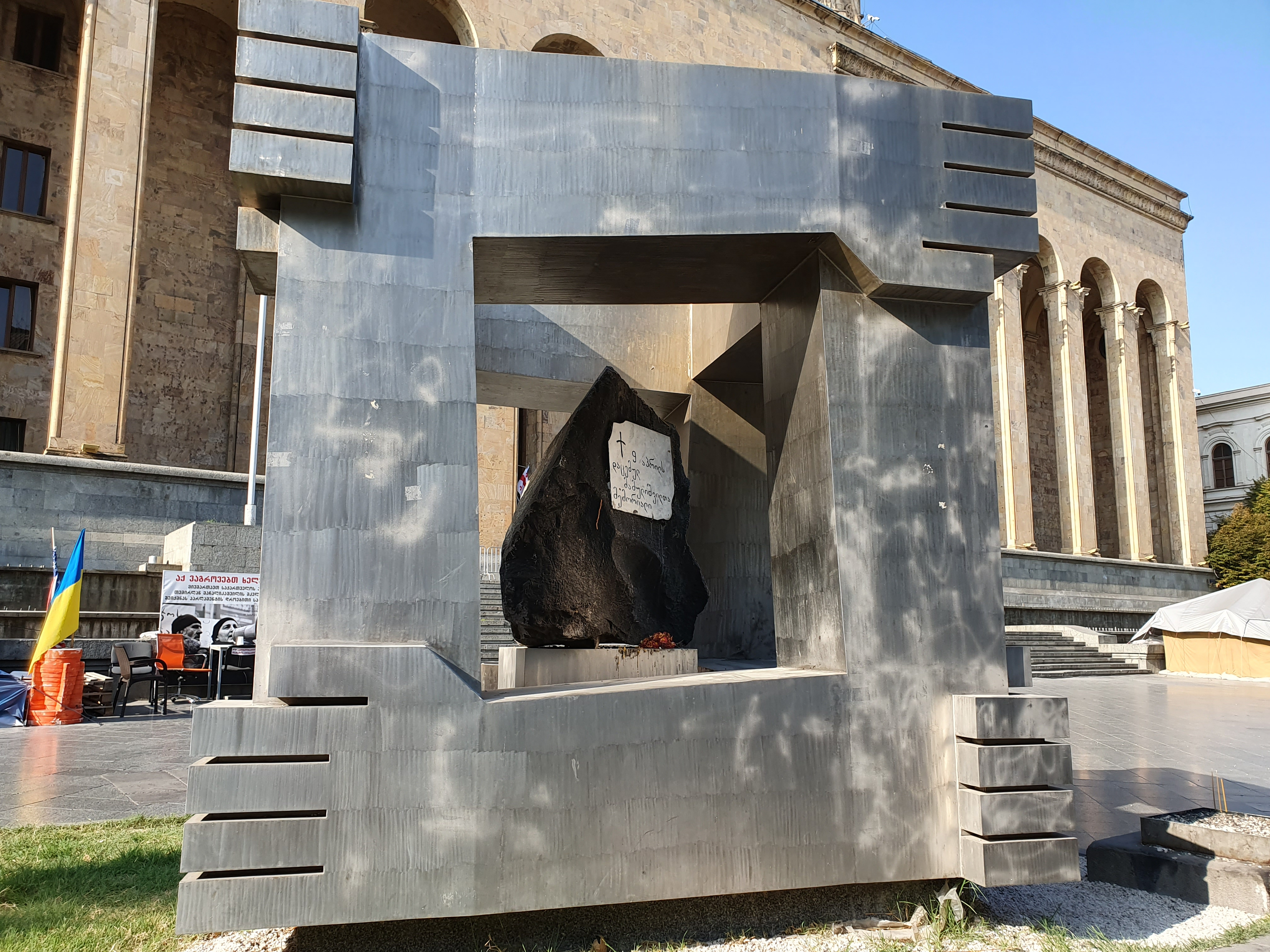
A memorial sculpture outside the Parliament building (pictured 2019)

The April 9 tragedy radicalised Georgian opposition to Soviet power. A few months later, a session of the Supreme Council of Georgian SSR, held on November 17–18, 1989, officially condemned the occupation and annexation of the Democratic Republic of Georgia by Soviet Russia in 1921.

The events of April 9 also gave rise to the so-called 'Tbilisi Syndrome'. This syndrome was characterized by the reluctance of military officers and soldiers to take any tactical decisions or even obey orders without a clear trail of responsibility to a higher authority. It arose because of the Soviet leadership's refusal to take responsibility for the orders to clear the square and the commission report's and Shevardnadze's criticism of the military in general. 'Tbilisi Syndrome' continued to spread in the coming years, especially following events in Baku and Vilnius, and contributed in 1991 to the refusal of soldiers to prevent demonstrations during the August 1991 coup attempt.

On March 31, 1991, Georgians voted overwhelmingly in favor of independence from the Soviet Union in a referendum. With a 90.5% turnout, approximately 99% voted in favor of independence. On April 9, the second anniversary of the tragedy, the Supreme Council of the Republic of Georgia proclaimed Georgian sovereignty and independence from the Soviet Union.

A memorial to the victims of the tragedy was opened at the location of the crackdown on Rustaveli Avenue on November 23, 2004.

== See also ==
- Black January
- Revolutions of 1989
- 1956 Georgian demonstrations, 9 March 1956 massacre in Tbilisi
- 1978 Georgian demonstrations
- January Events, 1991 in Lithuania
- The Barricades, 1991 in Latvia
- Jeltoqsan
- Novocherkassk massacre
