= 1991 Georgian independence referendum =

- 31 March 1991
- Do you support the restoration of the independence of Georgia in accordance with the Act of Declaration of Independence of Georgia of 26 May 1918?

Results
Choice	Votes	%
Yes	3,295,493	99.49%
No	16,917	0.51%
Valid votes	3,312,410	99.59%
Invalid or blank votes	13,690	0.41%
Total votes	3,326,100	100.00%
Registered voters/turnout	3,672,403	90.57%

An independence referendum was held in the Republic of Georgia on 31 March 1991. It was approved by 99.5% of voters.

== Background ==
The referendum was sanctioned by the Georgian Supreme Council which was elected in the first multi-party elections held in Soviet Georgia in October 1990, and was dominated by a pro-independence bloc Round Table-Free Georgia led by the Soviet-era dissident Zviad Gamsakhurdia. Having mostly boycotted the all-Union referendum on continued federation and the negotiations on a new union treaty on 17 March, Georgia became the fourth Soviet republic, after the three Baltic states (Lithuania on 9 February 1991 and Latvia and Estonia on 3 March), to organize the referendum on the issue of independence.

The only question of the referendum asked: "Do you support the restoration of the independence of Georgia in accordance with the Act of Declaration of Independence of Georgia of May 26, 1918?" The official results showed over 99% in favor with a 90.6% voter turnout. Due to the ongoing ethnic discord, the polls were largely boycotted by the non-Georgian population in Abkhazia and South Ossetia, although local Georgian population of these regions participated in the vote.

Four days after the final results were announced, the Georgian Supreme Council unanimously passed the declaration of independence on the second anniversary of the Soviet army crackdown on peaceful protests in Tbilisi on 9 April 1989.

The referendum coincided with a private visit of the former U.S. President Richard Nixon who visited a few polling stations in Georgia’s capital Tbilisi before his departure to Moscow later that day.

== Results ==
Choice	Votes	%
For	3,295,493	99.49
Against	16,917	0.51
Total	3,312,410	100.00
Valid votes	3,312,410	99.59
Invalid/blank votes	13,690	0.41
Total votes	3,326,100	100.00
Registered voters/turnout	3,672,403	90.57
Source: Nohlen et al., Direct Democracy
