= 1990 Georgian Supreme Soviet election =

- 28 October 1990 (first round); 11 November 1990 (second round)
- All 250 seats in the Supreme Soviet; 126 seats needed for a majority
- Turnout: 69.59%
Party	Leader	Seats	+/–
Round Table	Zviad Gamsakhurdia	155	New
SKP	Givi Gumbaridze	64	−186
People's Front	Nodar Natadze	12	New
Democratic Georgia		4	New
LERB		2	New
Rustaveli Society	Akaki Bakradze	1	New
Independents	–	9	+9
This lists parties that won seats. See the complete results below.
Chairman of the Presidium of the Supreme Soviet before	Chairman of the Supreme Council after
Givi Gumbaridze; SKP	Zviad Gamsakhurdia; Round Table

Parliamentary elections were held in the Georgian SSR on 28 October 1990, with a second round on 11 November. They were the first free parliamentary elections in Georgia since 1919 and saw Round Table-Free Georgia emerge as the largest party in Parliament with 155 of the 250 seats. Voter turnout was 70%.

Round Table-Free Georgia MP Zviad Gamsakhurdia was subsequently elected by the Congress as Chairman of the Presidium of the Supreme Council on 14 November, effectively becoming the leader of Georgia.

The elections were the first in the Soviet Union in which the opposition groups were registered as formal political parties. On 9 April 1991, the newly elected Georgian legislature issued a declaration of Georgian independence from the USSR.

== Electoral system ==
On 18 August 1990 a new electoral law was passed providing for the election of the legislature consisting of 250 members, 125 elected by proportional representation and 125 from single-member districts using the two-round system. The electoral threshold for the proportional seats was set at 4%. Political parties, trade unions and movements were allowed to nominate candidates.

== Results ==
Party	National			Constituency			Total seats
Party	Votes	%	Seats	Votes	%	Seats	Total seats
Round Table—Free Georgia	1,248,111	53.99	81			74	155
Communist Party of Georgia	683,824	29.58	44			20	64
Concord, Peace, Revival Bloc	80,262	3.47	0			0	0
Freedom Bloc	71,602	3.10	0			0	0
All-Georgian Rustaveli Society	53,673	2.32	0			1	1
People's Front	43,771	1.89	0			12	12
Democratic Georgia Bloc	40,769	1.76	0			4	4
Liberation and Economic Revival Bloc	33,687	1.46	0			1	1
Social Democrat Party of Georgia	32,699	1.41	0			0	0
Progressive Party of Georgia	15,496	0.67	0			0	0
Political Union of Citizens–All-Georgian Farmers Union	8,029	0.35	0			0	0
Independents						9	9
Vacant						4	4
Total	2,311,923	100.00	125			125	250
Valid votes	2,311,923	96.46					
Invalid/blank votes	84,797	3.54					
Total votes	2,396,720	100.00					
Registered voters/turnout	3,444,002	69.59					
Source: Nohlen et al.
