= Irakli Abashidze =

Georgian poet and politician

- ირაკლი აბაშიძე

9th Chairman of the Supreme Soviet of the Georgian SSR
- In office 12 July 1971 – 14 November 1990

Personal details
- Born: 10 September 1909 Khoni, Kutais Governorate, Russian Empire
- Died: 14 January 1992 (aged 82) Tbilisi
- Education: Tbilisi State University
- Occupation: Poet, Literary scholar, Politician
- Awards: Shota Rustaveli Prize (1965)

Irakli Abashidze (Georgian: ირაკლი აბაშიძე; Russian: Ира́клий Виссарио́нович Абаши́дзе; 10 September 1909 – 14 January 1992) was a Georgian poet, literary scholar and politician.

Abashidze was born in Khoni, Kutais Governorate, Russian Empire. He graduated from Tbilisi State University in 1931 and attended the 1st Congress of the Union of Soviet Writers in 1934, when socialist realism was laid down as the cultural orthodoxy. From 1953 to 1967, he chaired the Union of Georgian Writers.

In 1970 he also became a vice-president of the Georgian Academy of Sciences. In 1960 he organized an expedition to the Georgian-built Monastery of the Cross at Jerusalem where his team rediscovered a fresco of Shota Rustaveli, a medieval Georgian poet. He chaired the special academic commission for the Rustaveli studies since 1963 and became the founder and an editor-in-chief of The Georgian Soviet Encyclopedia in 1967.

His poems are viewed as classical works of Georgian literature. His poetry was mostly patriotic based on Georgian cultural and religious values, but normally loyal to Soviet ideology. He became a member of the Supreme Soviet of the Georgian SSR from 1971 to 1990, he welcomed Mikhail Gorbachev’s perestroika and supported the Soviet-era dissident Zviad Gamsakhurdia when he came to power and led Georgia to the declaration of independence in 1991. Abashidze died in Tbilisi in 1992 and was afforded a state funeral. He was 82.
