= Round Table—Free Georgia =

Round Table—Free Georgia მრგვალი მაგიდა - თავისუფალი საქართველო
- Leader: Zviad Gamsakhurdia
- Founded: May 1990
- Dissolved: January 1994
- Headquarters: Tbilisi
- Ideology: Georgian nationalism; National conservatism; Christian nationalism; Christian democracy; Pan-Caucasianism; Social market economy; State capitalism; Faction: Constitutional monarchism; Euroscepticism
- Political position: Centre-right to right-wing
- International affiliation: Assembly of Popular Fronts and Movements from Republics Not Joining the Union Treaty

Round Table—Free Georgia (Georgian: მრგვალი მაგიდა — თავისუფალი საქართველო, romanized: mrgvali magida — tavisupali sakartvelo) was an alliance of Georgian political parties led by Zviad Gamsakhurdia. It played a decisive role in the restoration of independence of Georgia and was a governing coalition from 1990 until 1992.

== History ==
The alliance traces its origins to the Georgian independence movement of the 1980s. On 11–13 March 1990, several pro-independence Georgian political organizations held conference in Tbilisi to elect a coordinating body for their activities - National Forum. However, soon they split, and in May 1990, organizations supporting dissident Zviad Gamsakhurdia established Round Table—Free Georgia alliance, calling for a peaceful transition to independence through participation in the official elections for the Supreme Council, the legislative body in the Soviet Georgia. Meanwhile, other organizations opted to set their own elections for an alternative legislative body, the National Congress. In October 1990, the Round Table—Free Georgia took part in the first multiparty parliamentary elections in the history of Soviet Georgia, receiving 53.99% of the overall votes and gaining majority in the Supreme Council.

Round Table formed the government in November 1990. Supported by the referendum, the alliance declared the independence of Georgia on 9 April 1991. Zviad Gamsakhurdia was elected as a first-ever president of Georgia on 26 May 1991. However, the armed opposition staged the military coup and Zviad Gamsakhurdia was forced to flee the country in January 1992. The Military Junta dissolved the Supreme Council, dismissed President Zviad Gamsakhurdia from the post of President and assumed all power in the republic. Members of Round Table together with Zviad Gamsakhurdia fled to the neighboring Chechen republic of Ichkeria. On 12 March 1992, they organized a Georgian Supreme Council session in Grozny and formed the government in exile under Zviad Gamsakhurdia. They declared the Military Junta as illegal and continued to regard the disbanded Supreme Council as Georgia's sole legitimate parliament.

Mingrelia, Gamsakhurdia's home region, refused to obey to the post-coup government of Eduard Shevardnadze, and by August 1993 it came under almost full control of pro-Gamsakhurdia militias. In late August 1993, the Round Table—Free Georgia members held a Supreme Council session in Zugdidi and called on Zviad Gamsakhurdia to return to Georgia, which he did in September 1993. However, they were defeated in the civil war, while Gamsakhurdia was found dead in January 1994. After these events, the alliance dissolved. Some parties claim the legacy of the Round Table like Free Georgia or Tavisupleba.

== Political platform ==
=== Economic policy ===
In his election program, Zviad Gamsakhurdia supported social market economy.

On 26 August 1991, the President Zviad Gamsakhurdia approved the prime minister–designate Besarion Gugushvili, who presented his economic program to the Parliament in support of state capitalism. It argued in favor of transition from socialist planned economy but also denounced calls for implementation of shock therapy and mass privatization. It claimed that the "egoistic stimuls" of the privatized enterprises would lead them to be more inclined towards Soviet market, exacerbating the economic dependency on Soviet Union and creating contradiction between the private entities and the national state. It thus argued that these policies were imperialist tools of Mikheil Gorbachev to retain influence on the post-Soviet sphere. It warned that the nomenklatura, a bureaucratic elite of the Soviet system, was trying to take control of the economy through converting its "political and administrative capital" into the "economic capital". The program warned about the risks of adopting foreign models and called for creation of economic policy based on general principles of private entrepreneurship, market economy and privatization, but in conformity with Georgian spirit, characteristics and traditional values. The program supported state capitalism, indicative planning, mixed economy and other forms of statism. It argued that the state should activily be involved in the economy, while private enterprises would be allowed to exist, they would compete with state companies. It claimed that the state involvement in the economy would ensure the welfare of the population. Thus, while the program opposed full-scale privatization, it still supported privatization, but the state and private sectors would develop harmonically. The program described the public sector as "a joint-stock company in which the whole nation is a shareholder and which is run by managers who are elected by the nation". It argued that the state sector should be run on democratic, national, patriotic principles, unlike the Soviet system, which was totalitarian and social-imperialistic tool of plundering the colonies like Georgia. The program warned against viewing mass privatization of public assets as the only instrument of creating private sector, arguing in favor of giving secured loans and using other instruments instead to encourage building new factories and enterprises, instead of giving away already existing ones which would be mismanaged due to lack of "traditions of care of private capital".

=== Foreign policy ===
Although the coalition held ambivalent views on foreign policy issues, the consensus has been identified in the academic literature on three major points: the foreign policy of its leader Zviad Gamsakhurdia turned from explicitly pro-Western in the first phase of his presidency to the nativist, regionalist pan-Caucasian vision in the later phase, Gamsakhurdia's foreign policy was marked by a fierce opposition to Russia, and that his policy was influenced by religious concepts.

==== Russia ====
Gamsakhurdia's foreign policy has been marked by a fierce opposition to the Soviet Union. On 7 December 1990, Zvaid Gamsakhurdia described Georgia as a "captive in the prison of peoples of the Soviet Empire, isolated from the rest of the world". Gamsakhurdia rejected the Soviet Union for its totalitarianism, arguing that "we need to be an island of democracy in a totalitarian world". Gamsakhurdia decried the Soviet Union for "occupying and annexing" Georgia in 1921 and accused it of "putting the country on the verge of socio-political, economic and cultural collapse".

In contrast, Gamsakhurdia's views on Russia differed from his views on the Soviet Union, especially in the first phase of his presidency. He drew a line between "democratic forces" of Russia and the "dark reactionary forces" of the Soviet Union, and argued for finding a common ground with the former. He emphasized that the democratic forces of Russia were being challenged by the "imperial centre" and that it was also engaged in a struggle for freedom. Moreover, he regarded the sovereignty of Russia as being an important precondition for the collapse of the Soviet Union. Gamsakhurdia expressed sympathy with Russian president Boris Yeltsin in February 1991. However, his opinion on Yeltsin and Russia began to change in the later months and in November 1991, he denounced Yeltsin's decision to declare a material law in Chechnya after its secession from Russia, saying: "I have always known you as a champion of peoples' freedom and defender of democracy... but such a sudden turnaround of events causes a disappointment". On 21 December 1991, Gamsakhurdia denounced Russia for seeking to annex Georgia's South Ossetia autonomous region. In exile, Gamsakhurdia intensified his criticism of Russia, referring to it as a "modernized empire", saying that in June 1992 his government was toppled with the Russian help for rejecting the pro-Russian policy.

==== European integration ====
The coalition's approach towards the European integration was ambivalent. In the beginning of its term, its leader Zviad Gamsakhurdia expressed pro-European and pro-Western sentiments, including support for what he called "progressive" integration processes in Europe and membership in the European Community, describing it as "our biggest objective" on 16 July 1991. Moreover, he commended the West for upholding the individual rights, liberties and democracy, while supporting the implementation of Western European political systems in Georgia.

By the end of their term, Gamsakhurdia and the Round Table coalition in general became extremely critical of the West. In late 1991, Gamsakhurdia said that the West was not interested in the disintegration of the Soviet Empire, which put it at odds with his policy of resisting any rapproachment with the USSR. In later months, Gamsakhurdia accused the West of collusion with Russia and the coup leaders to overthrow his government. By mid-1992, Gamsakhurdia elaborated that the Western position was based on hostility to the "national orientation" of his policy, and by 1993, Gamsakhurdia identified the "Western depravity" and "surrogacy of culture" as being in contradiction with the "Georgian Christian way of life and morality", while also noting the dangers of "excessive, one-sided" emancipation of the women in the West. Gamsakhurdia expressed dualist visions of the West: he rejected the Western integration being defined as "the cult of pornographics and horror movies, gangsters heroism, begging for money and credits in the West, suspicious political agreements with the adventurist Western politicians, their invitation to Georgia and selling to them country's natural and fossil resource, resorts, industrial objects and etc." However, Gamsakhurdia declared that in contrast the "Western culture, civilization, art, political thoughts, philosophy, social and legal systems are utterly familiar and close to us", calling this the "true Western orientation".

On 29 October 1991, the editorial staff of the official government media denounced the European integration as "cosmopolitan" and "anti-nationalist" in nature, masking the "complete depravity" and "devaluation of true values" under the veil of "democracy". It also condemned the European integration as restricting the national markets. The government media warned that the integration processes might lead to the Hong Kong-style American "paradise" instead of the national, Georgian Christian state.

On 31 October 1991, Giorgi Marjanishvili, the chairman of the National-Liberal Union, authored the article called the "Varieties of Imperialism". The article identified the Western goal as building the Greater Europe stretching from the Atlantic to Vladivostok, with Perestroika being part of this plan and the potential expansion of the project aiming to incorporate the entire humanity into one state. Marjanishvili commended the Georgian government for not following this line and instead taking the "Japanese approach" of synthetizing the European values with the national ones. Rejecting the Georgian membership into this possible European federation or confederation, Marjanishvili compared the "Greater Europe" to the Rudyard Kipling's idea of the British Empire as the all-governing corporation of the world, and the idea of "White Man's Burden". Sharing the opinion of G. K. Chesterton that Kipling "never actually loved the Britain as a concrete reality" but only as a possibility of "implementing abstract ideals in idealistic form", Marjanishvili rejected imperialism as being cosmopolitan and lacking patriotism, and juxtapositioned "loveless, hollow, rationalistic, Victorian-imperialist ideals" with the "Christian and Japanese" path.

==== Pan-Caucasianism ====
The party promoted the concept of "Caucasian home", based on the idea of shared Ibero-Caucasian languages and common identity among autochthonous Caucasian nations, primarily Chechens, Abkhazians and Circassians. It included a common economic zone, a Caucasian Forum and an alliance against foreign interference. It was basis of allegiance between Georgian president Zviad Gamsakhurdia and Chechen president Dzhokhar Dudayev.

Gamsakhurdia saw Georgia's future as rooted in its immediate neighbourhood. While recognizing Georgia to be culturally part of Europe and "the Christian civilization", Gamsakhurdia also saw Georgia as a cultural, geographic and political center of Caucasus, which he considered as a historical ethno-cultural space, a region of its own. Although Gamsakhurdia viewed Christianity as an inherent part of Georgian identity, he showed ambiguous position on the role of Christianity in the foreign policy, unlike its role in the domestic politics. Although he traced Georgia within Europe through its Christian heritage and referred to Georgia and Armenia as "small islands of Christianity", he still saw entire Caucasus as interconnected through history and common traditions, irrespective of linguistic, religious and ethnic differences. Moreover, Gamsakhurdia saw Georgia's role in assisting independence movements in Northern Caucasus. Gamsakhurdia admired Chechens for their resistance to Kremlin, and denounced Ossetians' and Abkhazians' affinity to Russia.

On 23 March 1991, Gamsakhurdia suggested to hold a "forum of the peoples of Caucasus" in Georgia. In exile, Gamsakhurdia advanced the idea of "Ibero-Caucasian civilization", a more nativist interpretation of pan-Caucasianism. He saw as its core base peoples who he referred to as "being of Ibero-Caucasian stock" – Georgians, Chechens, Ingush, Circassians, Adige, Abkhaz, Avars and others. However, he also incorporated other ethno-linguistic peoples into his concept of Ibero-Caucasian civilization, like Armenians, seeing them as descendants of "the Iberian-Anatolian Haysians who mixed with Indo-European Armenians", Azerbaijanis, seeing them as the descendants of Caucasian Albania mixed with Turks, and Balkars and Karachays, despite them being of "Turkic stock". Gamsakhurdia stated that Karabakh belonged to Armenia, although he later said his willingness to retract the statement to promote unity within the Caucasus. However, according to other scholars like Stephen Jones, Gamsakhurdia did not see Armenians and Turkic peoples as part of the Caucasian unity, seeing them as too foreign.

=== Role of religion ===
Round Table was a Christian nationalist party. In his inaugural speech, President Zviad Gamsakhurdia spoke about strengthening the role of religion and proposed an initiative to declare Orthodox Christianity the state religion.

== List of parties ==
- Georgian Helsinki Group (Georgian: საქართველოს ჰელსინკის კავშირი, sakartvelos helsink’is k’avshiri)
- All-Georgian Society of St. Ilia II the Righteous (Georgian: სრულიად საქართველოს წმინდა ილია მართლის საზოგადოება, sruliad sakartvelos ts’minda ilia martlis sazogadoeba)
- All-Georgian Society of Merab Kostava (Georgian: სრულიად საქართველოს მერაბ კოსტავას საზოგადოება, sruliad sakartvelos merab k’ost’avas sazogadoeba)
- Union of Georgian Traditionalists (Georgian: ქართველ ტრადიციონალისტთა კავშირი, kartvel t’raditsionalist’ta k’avshiri)
- Georgian National Front — Radical Union (Georgian: საქართველოს ეროვნული ფრონტი-რადიკალური კავშირი, sakartvelos erovnuli pront’i-radik’aluri k’avshiri)
- Georgian National–Liberal Union (Georgian: საქართველოს ეროვნულ-ლიბერალური კავშირი, sakartvelos erovnul-liberaluri k’avshiri)
- Georgian Christian–National Party (Georgian: საქართველოს ეროვნულ-ქრისტიანული პარტია, sakartvelos erovnul-krist’ianuli p’art’ia)

== International affiliation ==
On 25 and 26 May 1991, the delegates from Moldovian Popular Front, Lithuania's Sajudis, Latvian Popular Front, Estonian Popular Front, Armenian Pan-National Movement and Georgia's Round Table signed the founding documents of the Assembly of Popular Fronts and Movements from Republics Not Joining the Union Treaty in Chișinău, Moldova. The task of the organization was to function as a coordinating body for advocacy of the recognition of Soviet republics which had chosen not to sign the Mikhail Gorbachev's New Union Treaty and had moved to set up independent states instead.

== Electoral performance ==
=== Parliamentary election ===
| Election | Leader | Votes | % | Seats | +/– | Position |
|---|---|---|---|---|---|---|
| 1990 | Zviad Gamsakhurdia | 1,248,111 | 54 | 155 / 250 | New | 1st |

=== Presidential election ===
| Election year | Candidate | Result | |
| Election year | Candidate | # of overall votes | % of overall vote |
|---|---|---|---|
| 1991 | Zviad Gamsakhurdia | 2,565,362 | 87.58 (#1) |

=== Regional elections ===
==== Adjara ====
| Election | Leader | Votes | % | Seats | +/– | Position |
|---|---|---|---|---|---|---|
| 1991 | Aslan Abashidze | 59,949 | 47,5 | 21 / 40 | New | 1st |
