= Avtandil Margiani =

Georgian politician (born 1945)

- ავთანდილ მარგიანი

Member of the Georgian Parliament
- In office 1990–1995

Vice-Premier of Georgia
- In office 1992–1995

Personal details
- Born: c. 1945
- Party: Ertiani Sakartvelo (United Georgia)

Avtandil Margiani (Georgian: ავთანდილ მარგიანი; born 24 December, 1945) is a politician from Georgia. He served as a member of the Parliament of Georgia and held the position of Deputy Prime Minister of the country. Known for his pro-Russian stance. He is currently the leader of the political movement Democratic Movement – United Georgia.

== Career ==
Margiani has held various political positions in Georgia. He served as a member of the Georgian Parliament from 1990 to 1995. Additionally, he served as the country's Deputy Prime Minister from 1992 to 1995.

Margiani is also the leader of the political movement Democratic Movement – United Georgia.

== Political views ==
Margiani is known for his pro-Russian stance. Praising Russian president Vladimir Putin, he has said that if elected, his priority would be to establish friendship with Russia.
