= Jumber Patiashvili =

Soviet-Georgian politician; First Secretary of the Communist Party of Georgia

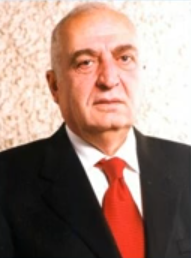
Jumber Patiashvili

Jumber Patiashvili (Georgian: ჯუმბერ პატიაშვილი; born 5 August 1939) is a Georgian politician. He was the Communist leader of the Georgian SSR from 1985 to 1989.

== Biography ==
Born in Lagodekhi, Kakheti (eastern Georgia), he graduated from Tbilisi Agricultural Institute. From 1966, he worked for Komsomol and subsequently from Communist Party. Patiashvili, a nondescript party loyalist, succeeded Eduard Shevardnadze as the First Secretary of the Georgian Communist Party in 1985. Under Patiashvili, most of Shevardnadze's initiatives atrophied, and no new policy innovations were undertaken. Patiashvili removed some of Shevardnadze's key appointees, although he could not dismiss his predecessor's many middle-echelon appointees without seriously damaging the party apparatus. By isolating opposition groups, Patiashvili forced reformist leaders into underground organizations and confrontational behavior. By the end of 1988, Georgian national movement became more active, several manifestations and hunger strikes were organized by the so-called informal political organizations. The protesters were brutally dispersed by the Soviet troops on April 9, 1989. Following the tragedy, the Georgian national liberation movement radicalized and left little chance to a local communist leadership to control the situation in the Republic. Patiashvili was removed from his office and replaced by the former KGB chief Givi Gumbaridze the same month.

He was elected MP in the Georgian parliament of 1992-1995. Patiashvili returned to the national politics prior to the 1999 parliamentary elections. He organized an oppositional Unity (ertoba in Georgian) party joining the oppositional bloc united behind the Democratic Revival Party led by Aslan Abashidze, regional leader of Adjara, and was elected in the Parliament of Georgia. Later, he distanced himself from Abashidze, remaining, however, in opposition to Eduard Shevardnadze’s government. His party took part in the oppositionist demonstrations which led to the Rose Revolution in November 2003. He was elected MP for Gori district in 2004.

He ran in the 2008 Georgian parliamentary election from the Gori constituency on the Rightist Alliance–Topadze-Industrialists bloc ticket.

Party political offices
Preceded by Eduard Shevardnadze	First Secretary of the Georgian Communist Party; 1985–1989	Succeeded by Givi Gumbaridze
