= Akaki Bakradze =

Akaki Bakradze (Georgian: აკაკი ბაქრაძე; 29 March 1928 – 6 December 1999) was a Georgian writer, literary critic, art historian, and public figure, who published widely on diverse issues. Among other prominent posts, Bakradze was director of the Rustaveli Theatre from 1973 to 1980, and in 1988 was appointed artistic director of the Marjanishvili Theatre.

Bakradze published in-depth studies on Ilia Chavchavadze, Akaki Tsereteli, Grigol Robakidze and on other major Georgian writers, and on social and literary issues. In the early 1990s, he led the Rustaveli Society, which was one of the political forces opposing Zviad Gamsakhurdia. In this role, he advocated for independence, pluralism, the private ownership of land, and independent parties.

Akaki Bakradze is the father of Lasha Bakradze, a literary scholar and public figure.

== Bibliography ==
- To the School, Intelekti Publishing, 2013
- For Abkhazia, Tbilisi, 2002,
- Last Night of Nino Chavchavadze, Tbilisi, 2000
- Mythological Engadi, Nekeri Publishing, 2000
- Kardu or Life and Merit of Grigol Robakidze, Lomisi Publishing, 1999
- Issue of Osetians, Pitagora Publishing, 1996
- Thirteen Years in Cinema- in the World of Masks, Farnavazi Publishing, 1996
- Discarded Road, Sarangi Publishing, 1995
- Faith, Merani Publishing, 1990
- Taming Literature, Sarangi Publishing, 1990, Ebooks Literasi Publishing, 2011
- Thought and Judgment, Sov. Georgia, 1972
