= Supreme Council of the Republic of Georgia =

Parliament of the Republic of Georgia

Supreme Council of the Republic of Georgia საქართველოს რესპუბლიკის უზენაესი საბჭო (Georgian)
- Georgia (1990–1992)
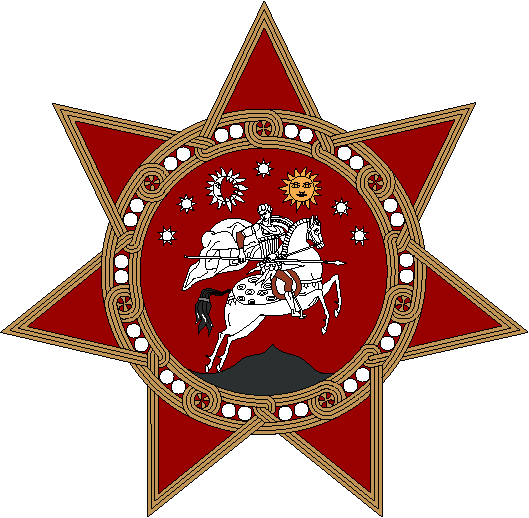
- Coat of arms of the Republic of Georgia

Type
- Type: Unicameral

History
- Established: 14 November 1990
- Disbanded: 6 January 1992
- Preceded by: Supreme Soviet of the Georgian SSR
- Succeeded by: Military Council

Leadership
- Chairman: Akaki Asatiani (last)

Structure
- Political groups: Government (155): Round Table (155); Opposition (91): Communist Party (64); People's Front (12); Democratic Georgia (4); Rustaveli Society (1); LERB (1); Independents (9); Vacant (4): Vacant seats (4)

Elections
- Last election: 28 October and 11 November 1990

Meeting place
- Supreme Council building, Tbilisi, Georgia

The Supreme Council of the Republic of Georgia (Georgian: საქართველოს რესპუბლიკის უზენაესი საბჭო, romanized: sakartvelos resp'ublik'is uzenaesi sabch'o) was the highest unicameral legislative body in Georgia elected in the first democratic, multiparty elections in the Caucasus on October 28, 1990, while the country was still part of the Soviet Union. The Council presided over the declaration of Georgia's independence from the Soviet Union in April 1991. The legislature split into rivaling factions and became defunct after a violent coup d'état ousted President Zviad Gamsakhurdia in January 1992. A pro-Gamsakhurdia faction managed to convene for a few times in exile and again in Georgia during Gamsakhurdia's failed attempt to regain power later in 1993. The Supreme Council was succeeded – after a brief parliamentary vacuum filled by the rule of the post-coup Military Council and then the State Council – by the Parliament of Georgia elected in October 1992.

The Supreme Council of the Republic of Georgia was preceded by the Supreme Soviet of the Georgian Soviet Socialist Republic (July 1938 – November 1990), which in its turn was a successor of the Congress of Soviets of Georgia (February 1922 – July 1938).

In September 2025, 32 former deputies convened a session in Tbilisi, where they claimed to have restored the Supreme Council. The conference claimed to then make Guram Isakadze their Chairman of the Supreme Council and former finance minister, Guram Absandze their acting prime minister.

== Chairmen of the Supreme Council of the Republic of Georgia ==
Image	Name	Period
	Zviad Gamsakhurdia	November 14, 1990–April 14, 1991
	Akaki Asatiani	April 14, 1991–January 2, 1992
