= People's Front (Georgia) =

Georgian political party

People's Front is a political organization in the Republic of Georgia. This party was founded in 1989, in Tbilisi. Chairman of the organization is a noted Georgian scholar, Professor Nodar Natadze.
