= Supreme Soviet of the Georgian Soviet Socialist Republic =

Legislature of the Georgian SSR 1938–1990

Supreme Soviet of the Georgian SSR საქართველოს სსრ-ის უმაღლესი საბჭო (Georgian) Верховный Совет Грузинской ССР (Russian)
- (Georgian Soviet Socialist Republic) Georgian SSR (1938-1990)
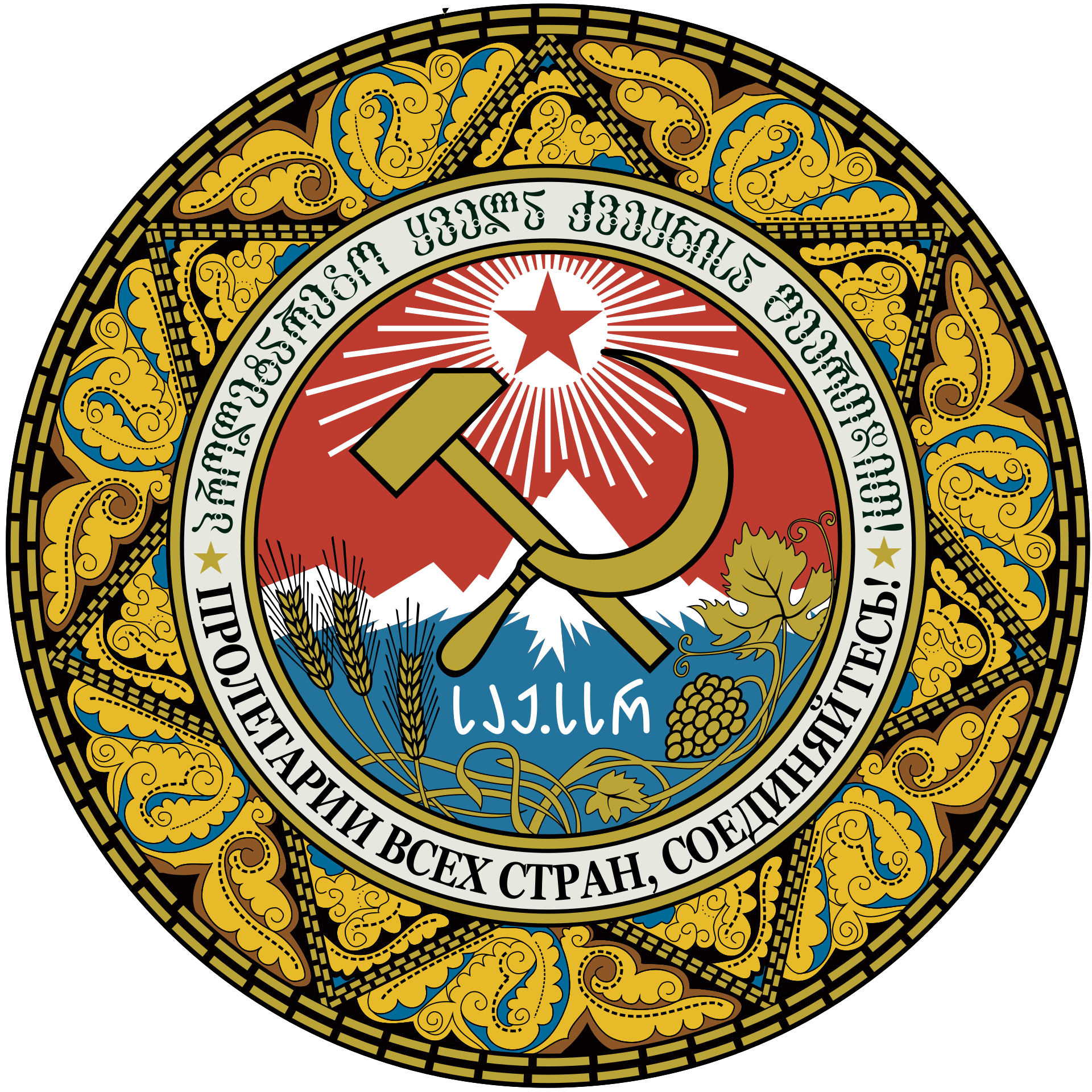
- Emblem of the Georgian Soviet Socialist Republic

Type
- Type: Supreme Soviet

History
- Established: 1938
- Disbanded: 1990
- Preceded by: All-Georgian Congress of Soviets
- Succeeded by: Supreme Council of the Republic of Georgia

Leadership
- Chairperson: Irakli Abashidze (last)
- Chairperson of the Presidium: Givi Gumbaridze (last)

Elections
- Last election: 1990

Meeting place
- Supreme Soviet building, Tbilisi, Georgian SSR, Soviet Union

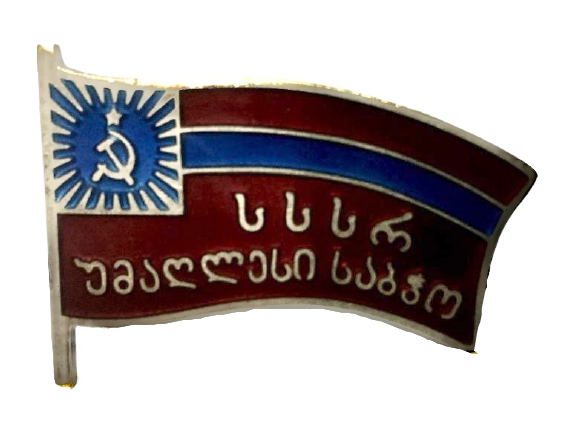
Badge of the Supreme Soviet of the Georgian SSR

The Supreme Soviet of the Georgian SSR (Georgian: საქართველოს სსრ-ის უმაღლესი საბჭო, sakartvelos ssr-is umaghlesi sabch’o; Russian: Верховный Совет Грузинской ССР, romanized: Verkhovnyy Sovet Gruzinskoy SSR) was the highest organ of state authority of the Georgian SSR from 1938 to 1990.

== History ==
The Supreme Soviet of the Georgian SSR was preceded by the All-Georgian Congress of Soviets which operated from 1922 to 1937. The Supreme Soviet was a unicameral institution and it consisted of 250 deputies (440 deputies before 1990). Deputies served five-year terms, but this was changed to four-year terms in 1978. The first multiparty elections were held on October 28, 1990, during the 1990 Georgian Supreme Soviet election. This was the first time that the Supreme Soviet of the Georgian SSR began to exercise state power. For most of its history, the Supreme Soviet of the Georgian SSR was dominated by the Communist Party of the Soviet Union and the Communist Party of Georgia.

== Convocations ==
- 1st Convocation (1938–1946)
- 2nd Convocation (1947–1950)
- 3rd Convocation (1951–1954)
- 4th Convocation (1955–1959)
- 5th Convocation (1959–1962)
- 6th Convocation (1963–1966)
- 7th Convocation (1967–1970)
- 8th Convocation (1971–1974)
- 9th Convocation (1975–1979)
- 10th Convocation (1980–1984)
- 11th Convocation (1985–1989)
- 12th Convocation (1990–1992), as the Supreme Council of the Republic of Georgia

== Chairperson of the Supreme Soviet ==
No.	Picture	Name (Birth–Death)	Took office	Left office	Political party
Chairperson of the Supreme Soviet
1		Joseph Kochlamazashvili (1906–1969)	8 July 1938	24 March 1947	CPSU
2		Vasily Gogua (1908–1967)	26 March 1947	26 March 1948	CPSU
3		Archil Gigoshvili (1907–1969)	26 March 1948	18 April 1951	CPSU
4		Mikhail Lelashvili (1910-?)	18 April 1951	6 April 1952	CPSU
5		Givi Javakhishvili (1912–1985)	6 April 1952	15 April 1953	CPSU
6		Archil Georgadze (1896-?)	15 April 1953	1954	CPSU
7		Victor Kupradze (1903–1985)	1954	26 April 1963	CPSU
8		Rafael Dvali (1909–1985)	26 April 1963	12 July 1971	CPSU
9		Irakli Abashidze (1909–1992)	12 July 1971	14 November 1990	CPSU

== See also ==
- Supreme Soviet of the Soviet Union
- Supreme Soviet
- Georgian SSR
