= Georgian Soviet Socialist Republic =

Soviet republic from 1921 to 1991

Socialist Soviet Republic of Georgia (1921–1936) საქართველოს სოციალისტური საბჭოთა რესპუბლიკა (Georgian) Социалистическая Советская Республика Грузия (Russian) Georgian Soviet Socialist Republic (1936–1990) საქართველოს საბჭოთა სოციალისტური რესპუბლიკა (Georgian) Грузинская Советская Социалистическая Республика (Russian) Republic of Georgia (1990–1991) საქართველოს რესპუბლიკა (Georgian) Республика Грузия (Russian)
- 1921–1991
- Flag (1951–1990) State emblem (1981–1990)
- Motto: პროლეტარებო ყველა ქვეყნისა, შეერთდით! (Georgian); Proletarebo qvela kveqnisa, sheertdit! (transliteration) "Proletarians of all countries, unite!"
- Anthem: საქართველოს საბჭოთა სოციალისტური რესპუბლიკის სახელმწიფო ჰიმნი Sakartvelos sabch’ota sotsialist’uri resp’ublik’is sakhelmts’ipo himni "Anthem of the Georgian Soviet Socialist Republic" (1946–1990) დიდება Dideba "Glory" (1990–1991)
- Location of Georgia (red) within the Soviet Union
- Status: 1921–1922: Semi-independent state 1922–1936: Part of the Transcaucasian SFSR; 1936–1990: Union republic of the Soviet Union; 1990–1991: Union Republic with priority of the Georgian legislation April–December 1991: De facto independent state
- Capital: Tbilisi; 41°43′21″N 44°47′33″E
- Common languages: Georgian (official language); Russian; Abkhaz^{a} Ossetian^{b} Mingrelian; Svan
- Religion: State atheism
- Government: 1920–1990: Unitary communist state; 1990–1991: Unitary parliamentary republic; May–December 1991: Unitary semi-presidential republic
- First Secretary
  - 1921–1922 (first): Mamia Orakhelashvili
  - 1989–1990 (last): Givi Gumbaridze
- Head of state
  - 1922–1923 (first): Filipp Makharadze
  - 1990–1991 (last): Zviad Gamsakhurdia
- Head of government
  - 1922 (first): Polikarp Mdivani
  - 1991 (last): Besarion Gugushvili
- Legislature: Supreme Soviet
- History
  - Soviet invasion and occupation: 25 February 1921
  - Formation: 25 February 1921
  - Admitted to USSR: 30 December 1922
  - TSFSR dissolved: 5 December 1936
  - Sovereignty declared: 9 March 1990
  - Renamed to Republic of Georgia: 14 November 1990
  - Independence declared: 9 April 1991
  - Independence recognized: 26 December 1991

Population
  - 1989 census: 5,443,359
- Currency: Soviet rouble (Rbl) (SUR)
- Calling code: +7 881/882/883
Preceded by
Democratic Republic of Georgia
Socialist Soviet Republic of Abkhazia
Transcaucasian Socialist Federative Soviet Republic
Succeeded by
Georgia
- Today part of: Georgia
- 1. Official language in the Abkhazian ASSR.; 2. In the South Ossetian AO.

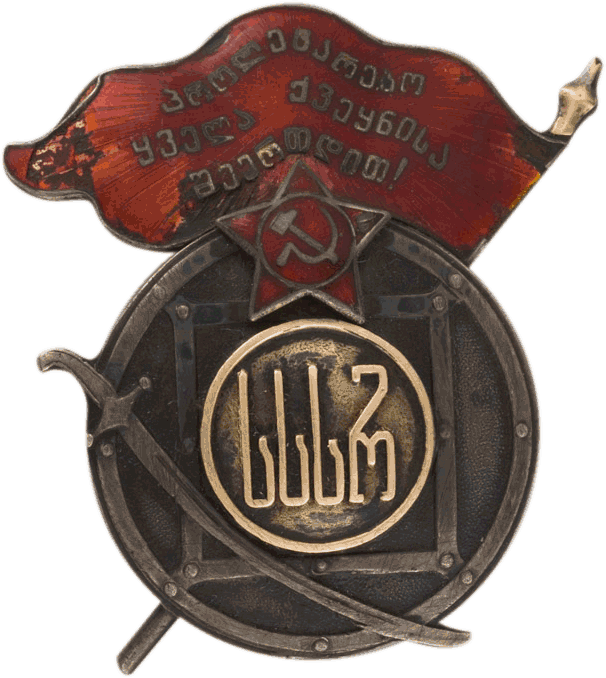
Order of the Red Banner of the Georgian SSR, 1923

The Georgian Soviet Socialist Republic, (Note: Georgian: საქართველოს საბჭოთა სოციალისტური რესპუბლიკა, romanized: Sakartvelos sabch'ota sotsialist'uri resp'ublik'a; Russian: Грузинская Советская Социалистическая Республика, romanized: Gruzinskaya Sovetskaya Sotsialisticheskaya Respublika) also known as Soviet Georgia, the Georgian SSR, or simply Georgia, was one of the republics of the Soviet Union from its occupation by the Red Army in 1921 to its independence in 1991. Coterminous with the present-day republic of Georgia including the contested regions of Abkhazia and South Ossetia, it was based on the traditional territory of Georgia, which had existed as a series of states in the Caucasus prior to the annexation by the Russian Empire in the course of the 19th century and from 1918 to 1921 as the Democratic Republic of Georgia. The Georgian SSR was formed in 1921 and subsequently incorporated in the Soviet Union in 1922. Until 1936 it was a part of the Transcaucasian Socialist Federative Soviet Republic, which existed as a union republic within the USSR. From November 18, 1989, the Georgian SSR declared its sovereignty over Soviet laws. The republic was renamed the Republic of Georgia on November 14, 1990, and subsequently became independent before the dissolution of the Soviet Union on April 9, 1991, whereupon each former SSR became a sovereign state.

Geographically, the Georgian SSR was bordered by Turkey to the south-west and the Black Sea to the west. Within the Soviet Union it bordered the Russian SFSR to the north, the Armenian SSR to the south and the Azerbaijan SSR to the south-east.

== History ==
=== Establishment ===
On November 28, 1917, after the October Revolution in Russia, there was a Transcaucasian Commissariat established in Tiflis. On April 22 the Transcaucasian Democratic Federative Republic was formed, though it only lasted for a month before being replaced by three new states: the Georgian Democratic Republic, the First Republic of Armenia and the Azerbaijan Democratic Republic. The 1919 parliamentary elections saw the Social Democratic Party come to power in Georgia. It tried to establish a moderate left, multi-party system, but faced some internal and external problems. Georgia was dragged into wars against Armenia and remnants of the Ottoman Empire, while the rapid spread of ideas of revolutionary socialism in rural regions accounted for some Soviet-backed peasants' revolts in Racha, Samegrelo and Dusheti. In 1921, the crisis came to a head. The 11th Red Army invaded Georgia from the south and headed to Tbilisi. On 25 February, after a one-week offensive by the Red Army, Tbilisi fell to the Bolsheviks. Georgian Bolsheviks took over the country and proclaimed the establishment of the Georgian SSR. Some small-scale battles between Bolshevik troops and Georgian Army also took place in Western Georgia. In March 1921 the government of the Georgian Democratic Republic was forced into exile. On March 2 of the following year the first constitution of Soviet Georgia was accepted.

On 13 October 1921 the Treaty of Kars was signed, which established the common borders between Turkey and the three Transcaucasian republics of the Soviet Union. The Georgian SSR was forced to cede the Georgian-dominated Artvin Okrug to Turkey in exchange for keeping Adjara, which was granted political autonomy within the Georgian SSR under Soviet rule.

=== Transcaucasian Soviet Federated Socialist Republic ===
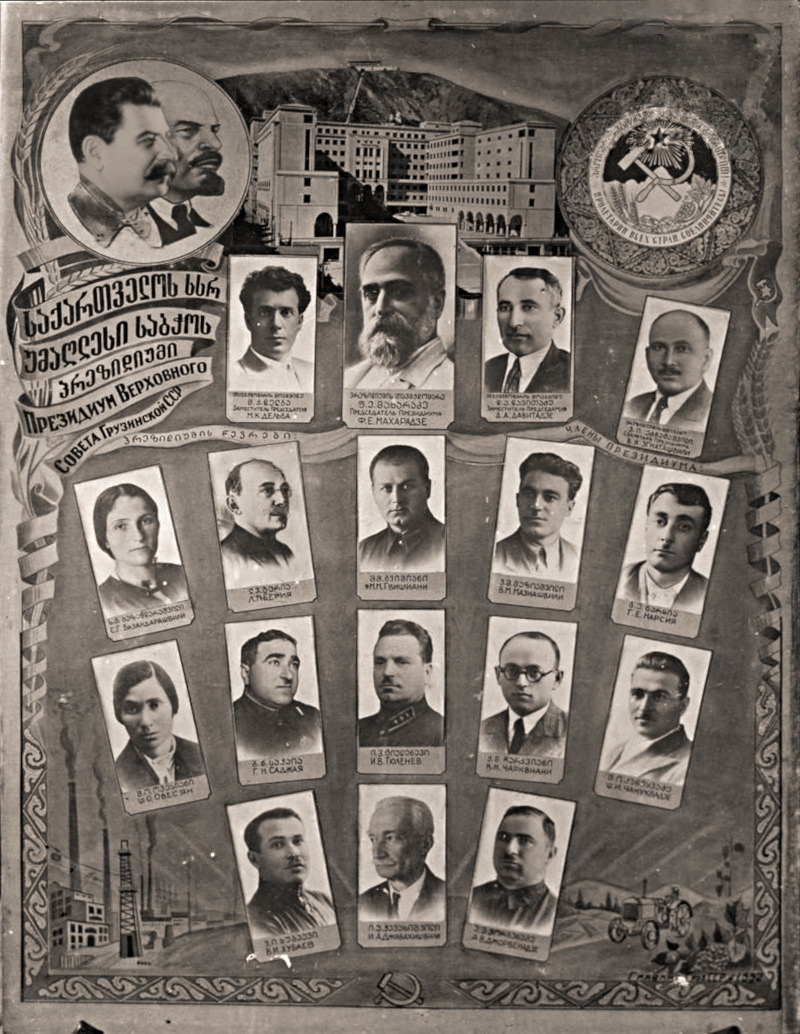
Members of the first Supreme Soviet of the Georgian SSR

In 1922 the Georgian SSR was incorporated into Soviet Union. From March 12, 1922, to December 5, 1936, it was part of the Transcaucasian SFSR together with the Armenian SSR and the Azerbaijan SSR. During this period the province was led by Lavrentiy Beria, the first secretary of the Central Committee of the Communist Party of Georgia. In 1936, the TSFSR was dissolved and Georgia became the Georgian Soviet Socialist Republic.

Lavrentiy Beria became the People's Commissar for Internal Affairs of the Soviet Union and was transferred to Moscow in 1938.

=== Purges ===
The exact number of Georgians executed during the Great Purges is not available, but some scholars suggest it varies from 30,000 to 60,000. During the purges, many eminent Georgian intellectuals such as Mikheil Javakhishvili, Evgeni Mikeladze, Vakhtang Kotetishvili, Paolo Iashvili, Titsian Tabidze and Dimitri Shevardnadze were executed or sent to the Gulag. Party officials also suffered the purges. Many prominent Georgian Bolsheviks, such as Mikheil Kakhiani, Mamia Orakhelashvili, Sergo Ordzhonikidze, Budu Mdivani, Mikheil Okujava and Samson Mamulia were removed from office and killed.

=== World War II ===
Reaching the Caucasus oilfields was one of the main objectives of Adolf Hitler's invasion of the USSR in June 1941, but the armies of the Axis powers never reached as far as Georgia. The country contributed almost 700,000 fighters (350,000 were killed) to the Red Army, and was a vital source of textiles and munitions. Joseph Stalin, an ethnic Georgian, led the USSR during the World War II. He ordered the deportation of the Chechen, German, Ingush, Karachay, Karapapakh, Meskhetian Turk and Balkarian peoples from the Caucasus, accusing them of collaboration with the Nazi German forces; they were transported to Siberia and Central Asia. He also abolished their respective autonomous republics. The Georgian SSR was briefly granted some of their territory until 1957.

=== Post-Stalin period ===
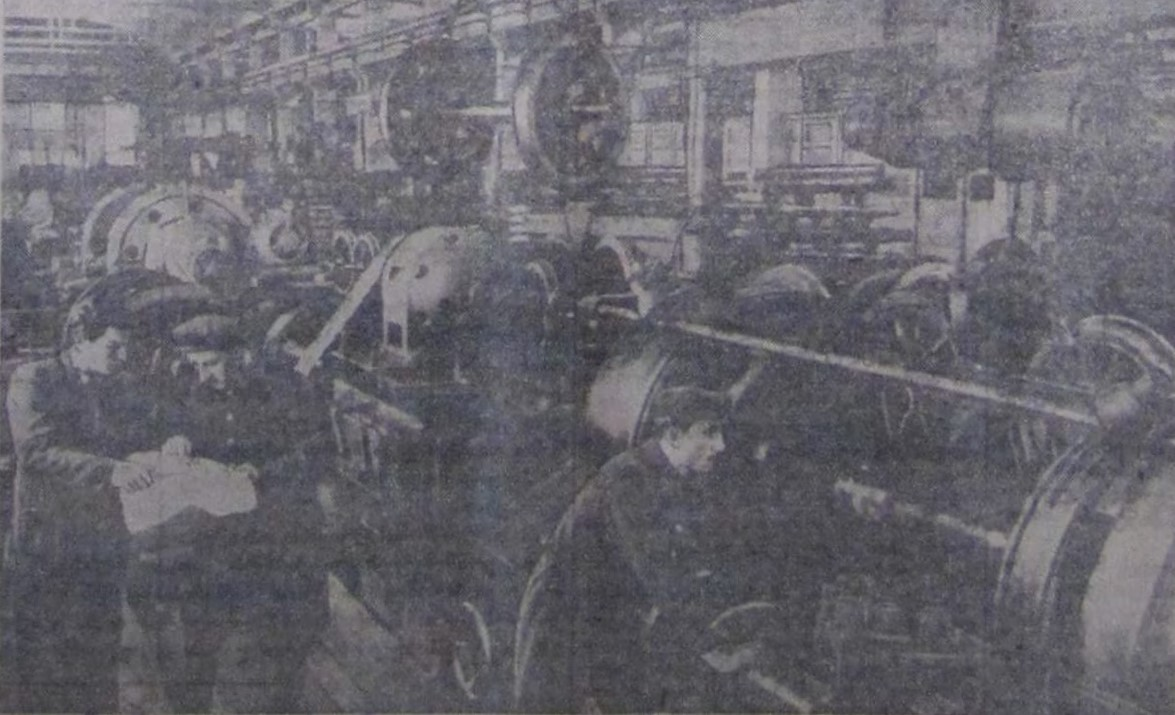
Workers at a factory in the Georgian SSR

On March 9, 1956, about a hundred Georgian students were killed when they demonstrated against Nikita Khrushchev's policy of de-Stalinization that was accompanied by an offhanded remark he made about Georgians at the end of his anti-Stalin speech.

The decentralisation program introduced by Khrushchev in the mid-1950s was soon exploited by Georgian Communist Party officials to build their own regional power base. A thriving pseudo-capitalist shadow economy emerged alongside the official state-owned economy. Some entrepreneurs ("commersants") produced and sold goods outside of the state sector while others ("speculators") obtained "deficit" goods through their connections and re-sold them at higher prices. The unofficial economy accounted for over 25% of the republic's GNP. While the official growth rate of the economy of the Georgia was among the lowest in the USSR, such indicators as savings level, rates of car and house ownership were the highest in the Union, making Georgia one of the most economically successful Soviet republics. Among all the union republics, Georgia had the highest number of residents with high or special secondary education.

Although corruption existed throughout the Soviet Union, it became so widespread and blatant in Georgia that it came to be an embarrassment to the authorities in Moscow. Eduard Shevardnadze, the country's interior minister between 1964 and 1972, gained a reputation as a fighter of corruption and engineered the removal of Vasil Mzhavanadze, the corrupt First Secretary of the Georgian Communist Party. Shevardnadze ascended to the post of First Secretary with the blessings of Moscow. He was an effective and able ruler of Georgia from 1972 to 1985, improving the official economy and dismissing hundreds of corrupt officials.

In the 1970s Soviet authorities adopted a new policy of forming a "Soviet people". The "Soviet people" were said to be a "new historical, social, and international community of people having a common territory, economy, and socialist content; a culture that reflected the particularities of multiple nationalities; a federal state; and a common ultimate goal: the construction of communism." Russian was meant to become the common language of this community, considering the role that Russian was playing for the nations and nationalities of the Soviet Union. However, in 1978, Soviet authorities had to face the opposition of thousands of Georgians, who gathered in downtown Tbilisi to hold mass demonstration after Soviet officials accepted removal of the constitutional status of the Georgian language as Georgia's sole official state language. Bowing to pressure from mass street demonstrations on April 14, 1978, Moscow approved Shevardnadze's reinstatement of the constitutional guarantee the same year. April 14 was established as a Day of the Georgian Language. In 1981, massive celebrations took place in honour of the republic's 60th anniversary, with a mass event taking place in front of General Secretary Brezhnev on Tbilisi's Constitution Square.

=== End of the Soviet period ===
Flag of the Republic of Georgia, 1990–2004

Shevardnadze's appointment as Soviet Foreign Minister in 1985 brought his replacement in Georgia by Jumber Patiashvili, a conservative and generally ineffective Communist who coped poorly with the challenges of perestroika. Towards the end of the late 1980s, increasingly violent clashes occurred between the Communist authorities, the resurgent Georgian nationalist movement and nationalist movements in Georgia's minority-populated regions (notably South Ossetia). On 9 April 1989, Soviet troops were used to break up a peaceful demonstration at the government building in Tbilisi. Twenty Georgians were killed and hundreds wounded. The event radicalised Georgian politics, prompting many—even some Georgian communists—to conclude that independence was preferable to remaining in the Soviet Union.

On 18 November 1989, Georgian SSR Supreme Soviet declared all union laws to be null, and a few months later, its Chairman of Presidium, Givi Gumbaridze led a supreme session with the 11th convocation of the supreme soviet, and issued a resolution which declared the protection of Georgian state sovereignty on 9 March 1990 and nullified previous treaties conducted by the RSFSR.

On October 28, 1990, democratic parliamentary elections were held. On November 14 a transitional period was declared until the restoration of Georgia's independence and in this regard, the republic changed its name to the Republic of Georgia. Georgia (excluding Abkhazia) was one of the six republics along with Armenia, Moldova and the Baltic States who boycotted participation in the March 1991 union-wide preservation referendum. On 31 March 1991, a referendum was held on the restoration of Georgia's independence on the basis of the Independence Act of 26 May 1918. The majority of voters voted in favor of the act.

Georgia declared independence on 9 April 1991 under Zviad Gamsakhurdia as one of the republics to secede just four months before the failed coup against Gorbachev in August, which was supported by a declining number of hardliners. However, this was unrecognized by the Soviet government and Georgia remained a part of the Soviet Union until its collapse in December 1991.

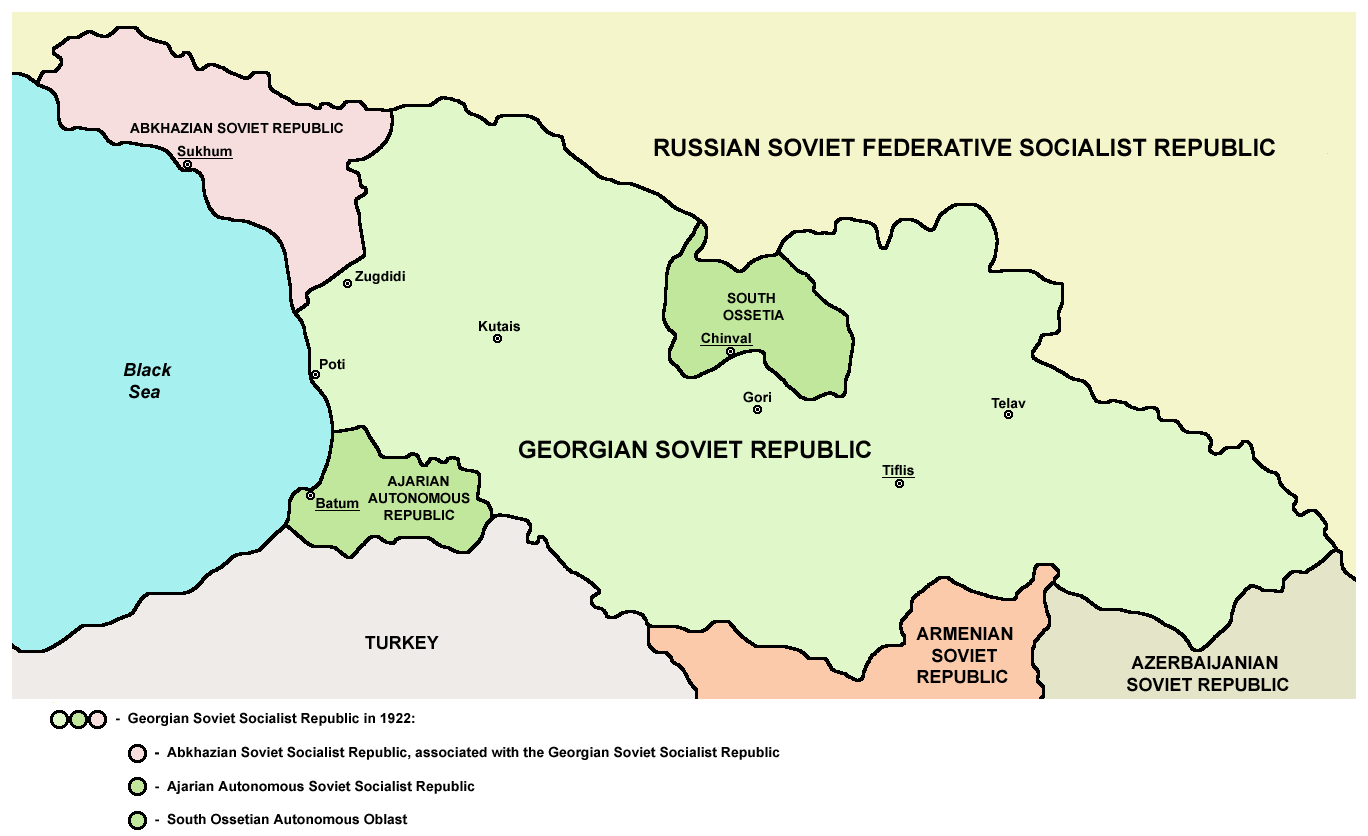
Map of the Georgian Socialist Soviet Republics in 1922–1931

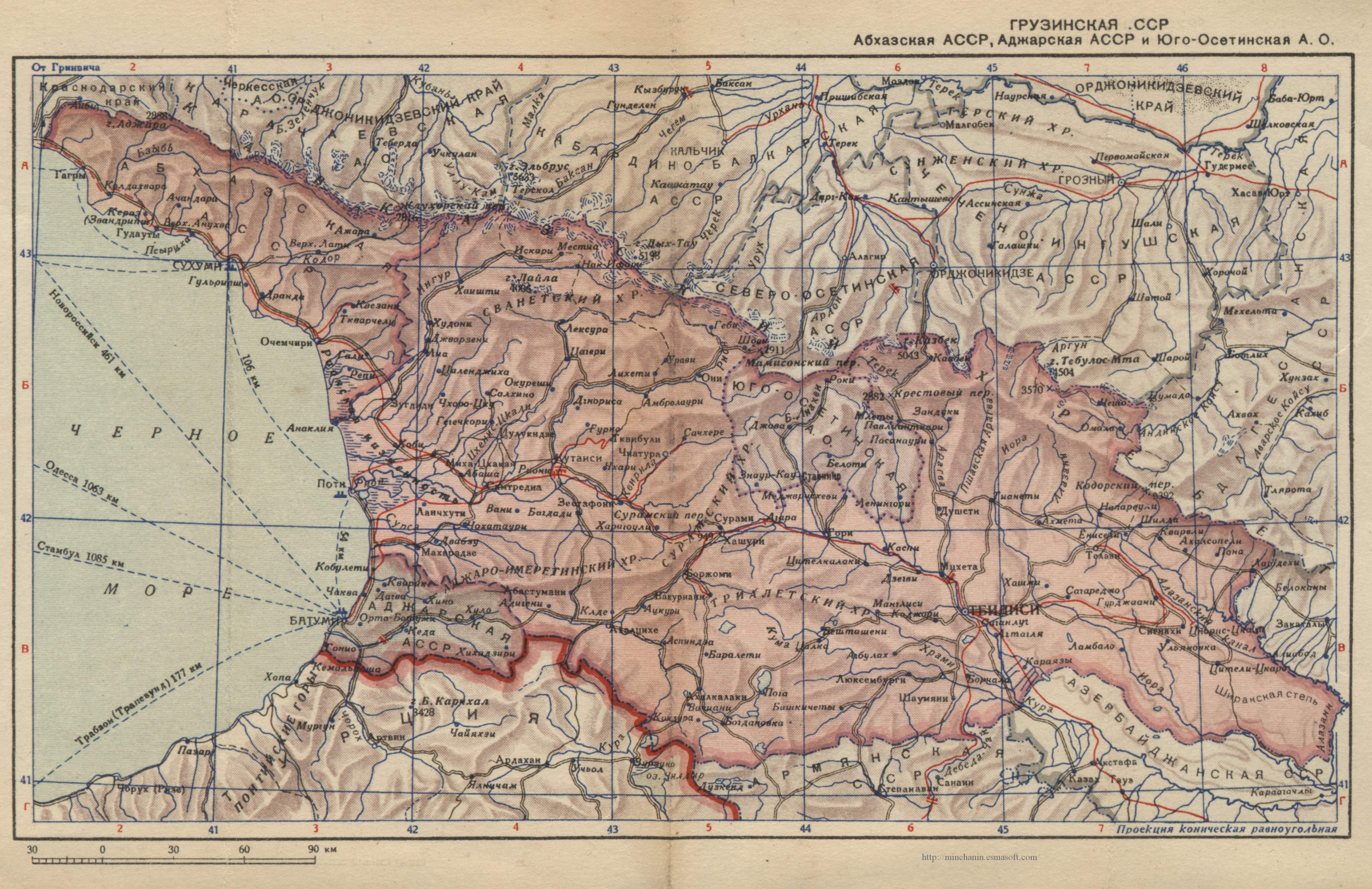
Map of the Georgian Soviet Socialist Republic in 1931–1943

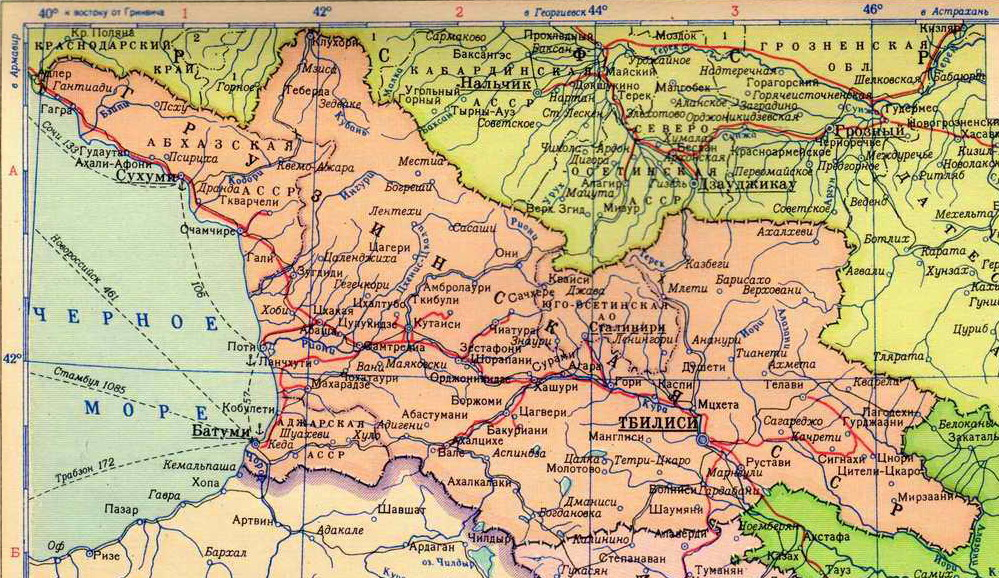
Map of the Georgian Soviet Socialist Republic in 1944–1955

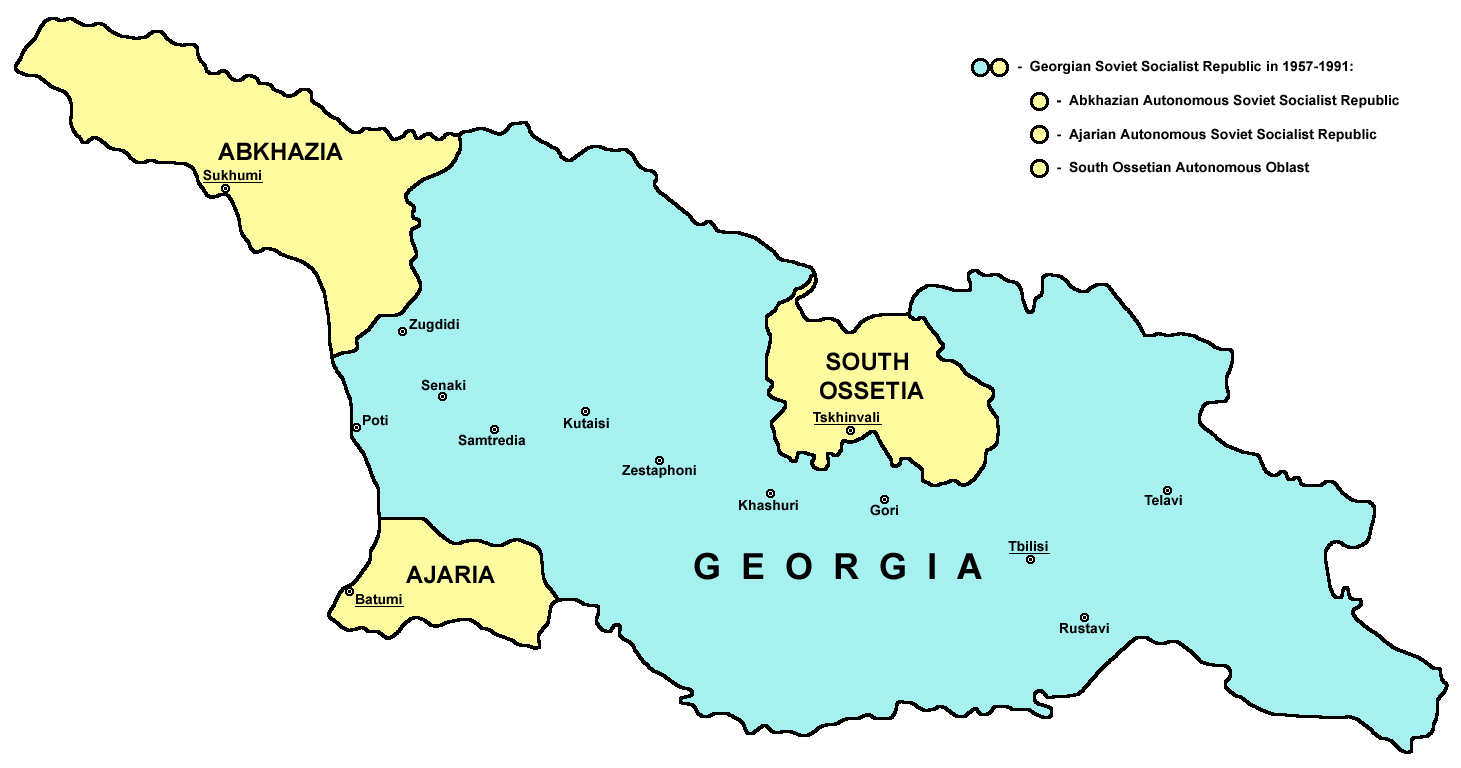
Map of the Georgian Soviet Socialist Republic in 1957–1991
