= Third Republic of Georgia =

The Third Republic of Georgia can refer to:

- Republic of Georgia (1990–1992) (if counting the Georgian SSR as the Second Republic)
- Georgia (if counting post-Soviet Georgia to be the same in the numbering system of republics, and counting the Georgian SSR, OR the Republic of Georgia (1990–1992) is counted as separate, and the Second Republic)
