= Second Republic of Georgia =

The Second Republic of Georgia can refer to:

- Georgian Soviet Socialist Republic
- Republic of Georgia (1990–1992)
- or Modern Georgia in-general, if the entirety post-Soviet Georgia is counted as one entity in the republic numbering system.
