= 2020 Georgian parliamentary election =

- 31 October 2020 (first round); 21 November 2020 (second round)

All 150 seats in Parliament 76 seats needed for a majority
- Turnout: 55.70% (▲3.76 pp; first round); 26.43% (▼11.07 pp; second round)
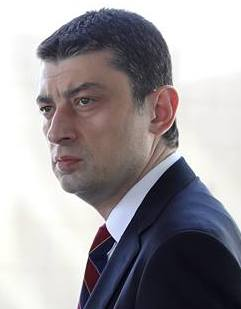

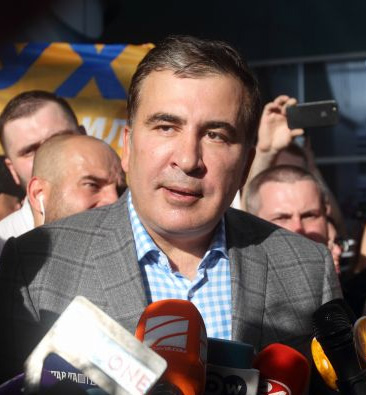

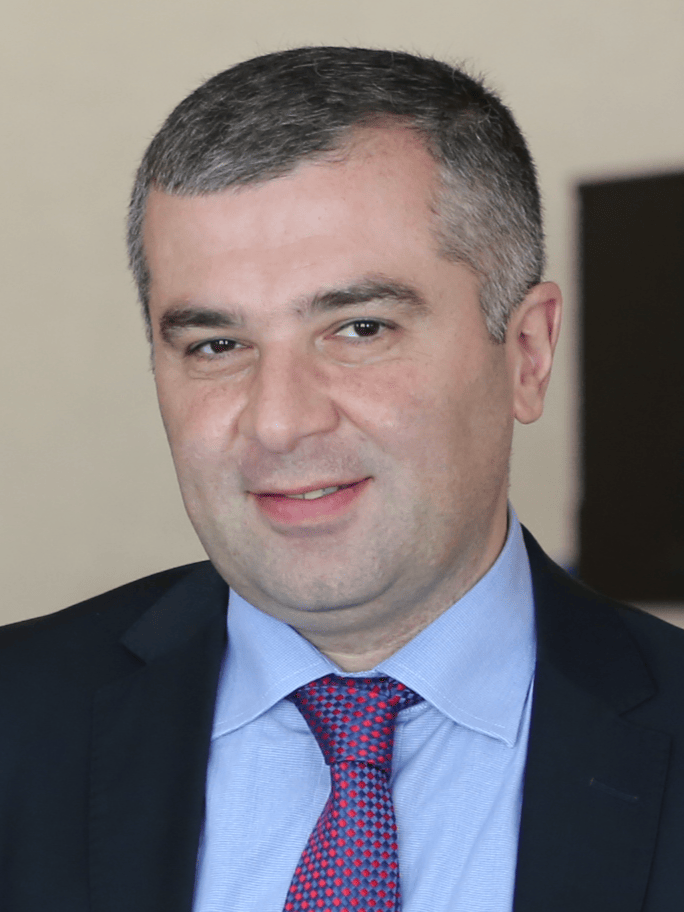
	First party	Second party	Third party
Leader	Giorgi Gakharia	Mikheil Saakashvili (Note: The bloc nominated Saakashvili as their candidate for Prime Minister.)	Davit Bakradze
Party	Georgian Dream	UNM	European Georgia
Alliance	–	Strength Is in Unity	–
Leader since	8 September 2019	7 September 2020	27 May 2017
Last election	107 seats (Note: Georgian Dream received 115 seats in the last election, however, 8 of those seats were allocated to different parties running on GD's ticket.)	27 seats	Did not exist
Seats won	90	36	5
Seat change	▼17	▲9	New
Constituency vote	938,634	492,951	105,010
% and swing	49.79% (▲2.84 pp)	26.15% (▲0.13 pp)	5.57% (New)
Proportional vote	928,004	523,127	72,986
% and swing	48.22% (▼0.46 pp)	27.18% (▲0.07 pp)	3.79% (New)
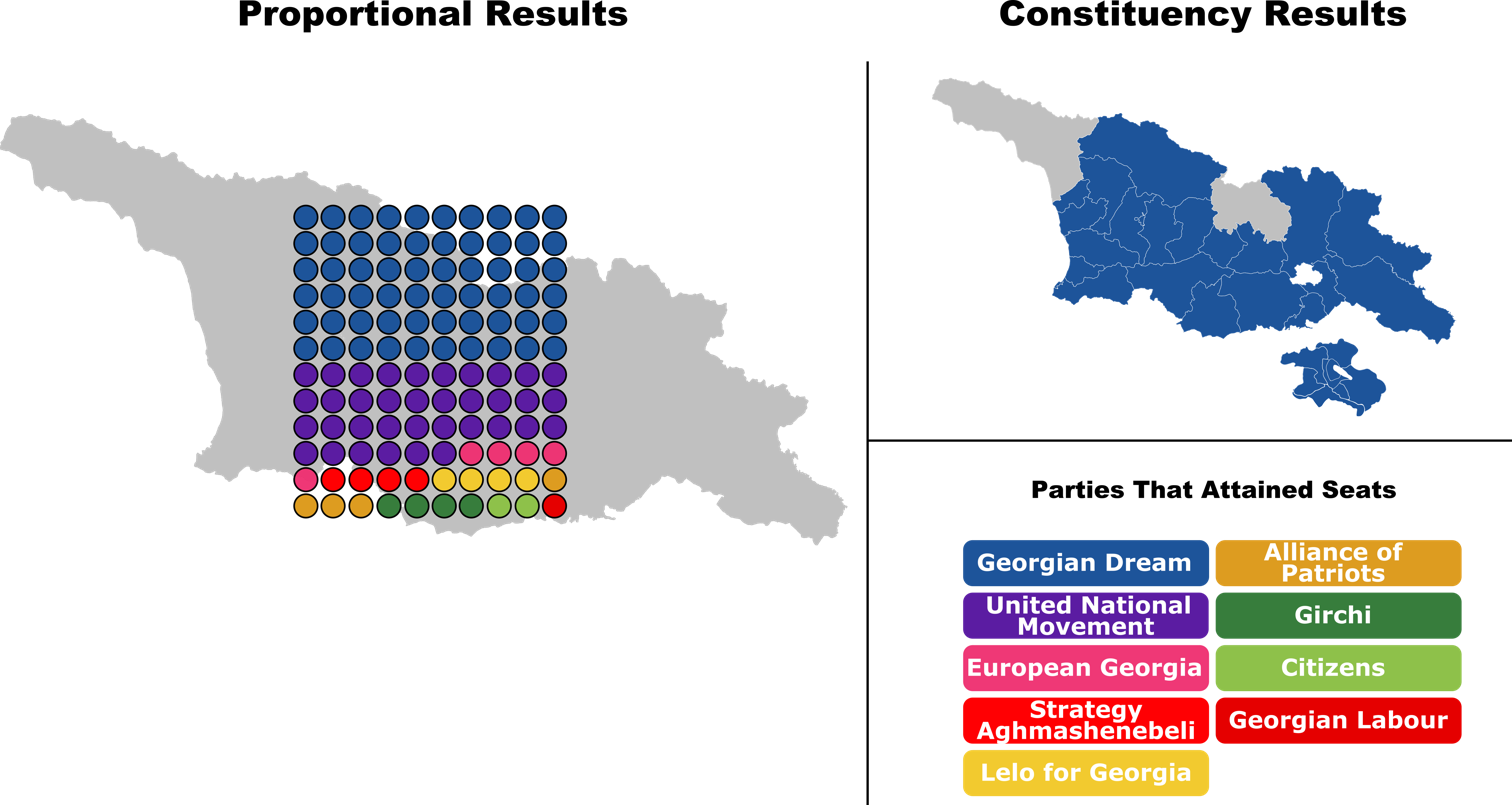
Prime Minister before election
Giorgi Gakharia
Georgian Dream
Elected Prime Minister
Giorgi Gakharia
Georgian Dream

Parliamentary elections were held in Georgia on 31 October and 21 November 2020 to elect the 150 members of Parliament. The ruling Georgian Dream party led by Prime Minister Giorgi Gakharia won re-election for a third term in office, making it the first party in Georgian history to do so. The elections also saw a record number of opposition parties elected to parliament.

The opposition boycotted the second round of the elections and called on voters to abstain; turnout in the second round was subsequently only 26%.

== Electoral system ==
In the previous election, 150 members of Parliament were elected by two methods: 77 were from a single nationwide constituency using closed list proportional representation with a 5% electoral threshold which was to be lowered to 3% for the 2020 election. The other 73 were elected in single-member constituencies using two-round system, in which candidates had to receive over 50% of the valid vote to win in the first round. A second round was held between the top two candidates if there was no winner in the first round.

=== New electoral law ===
Single-member districts used in the election

In June 2019, Georgian Dream announced plans to change the electoral system to full party-list proportional representation without an electoral threshold. Despite being supported by opposition parties, the legislation failed to be passed as only 101 of the 150 MPs voted in favour, fewer than the required 75% to change the electoral law.

After the failure of the proposed amendments to be passed with the 75% of votes from parliamentary deputies, the government and the opposition held several rounds of talks, and in early March 2020, a memorandum of understanding was issued from all the parties of the political spectrum. The new electoral law stipulated that 120 deputies would be elected via proportional representation, while another 30 would be elected from single-member constituencies. The constituencies would be drawn according to the instructions given by the Venice Commission, and the Georgian judiciary. For proportional seats, the electoral threshold was lowered to 1%. For single-member constituencies, a candidate would once again need 50% of the votes to be elected in the first round, otherwise, the top two candidates were to take part in a run-off, whose winner would be elected. In addition, no party could obtain a majority of seats without getting at least 40% of votes from the electorate. The US Embassy at Tbilisi lauded these agreements, as did leading European diplomats, who had desired the 2020 elections to be free and transparent.

In its first hearing on 21 June, Georgian parliament passed the electoral reforms. 136 MPs voted for these reforms, while 5 MPs voted against. On second reading of the bill, 115 MPs voted for the reforms, while 3 voted against and 1 abstained. The opposition United National Movement and European Georgia did not participate in the voting, as they demanded release of opposition figures i.e. Giorgi Rurua.

On 29 June 2020, the electoral reforms were adopted by the Georgian Parliament, with 117 out of 142 members voting in support for the reforms. U.S. Secretary of State Mike Pompeo welcomed these electoral reforms, calling on the Parliament and officials to respect the will of the people.

=== Further changes to the election code ===
The Georgian parliament passed further electoral reforms; however, the ultimate constitutional changes came from OSCE-ODIHR suggestions to the existing electoral code rather than the negotiations between the government and opposition. These include the regulation of election ads, the involvement of non-government entities in the electoral process, the regulation of the publication of opinion polls, and introducing a gender quota of 25%: no fewer than one in four candidates in each party had to belong to the other gender. The quota was to remain intact till 2028. 94 MPs supported these reforms, while European Georgia and UNM boycotted the vote. The US embassy praised the reforms, though voiced concerns over the remaining gaps in the electoral legislation, including lack of transparency in selecting Election Commission Members, dispute resolution, voter intimidation and providing for alternative channels to the campaign during the COVID-19 pandemic.

== Pre-election period and campaign ==
Ahead of the elections, UNM, European Georgia, Labour Party, and New Georgia formed an alliance. On 19 June 2020, they announced a joint slate of six candidates, who would compete in elections in Tbilisi. Newly formed party Lelo for Georgia refused to join the alliance. Analysts say that although the Georgian Dream suffered a dip in popularity in the aftermath of the crackdowns on the 2019-2020 anti-corruption protests, its relatively successful handling of the COVID-19 pandemic led to a boost in popularity.

Problems soon began to emerge in the alliance. Leader of the Citizens Party Aleko Elisashvili left the alliance, accusing the opposition of acting in their own self-interests, and espousing pro-Russian views. The opposition, in turn, accused Elisashvili of trying to ruin the alliance's unity.

By 19 June 2020, the opposition alliance consisted of 31 political parties.

The opposition Girchi Party said that if it entered parliament, it would give away Tesla cars via lottery to voters who would turn out in the elections. They said that they would purchase the cars with the state funding awarded to parliamentary parties.

On 4 September 2020, the election commission announced that 66 parties had successfully registered to run in the 2020 election.

== Opinion polls ==
Local regression trend line of poll results (excluding undecideds and abstentions) for the 2020 parliamentary election, with each line corresponding to a political party.

Date	Pollster	GD	UNM	EG	SLP	APG	DMUG	Citizens	Girchi	Lelo	DM	Others/NA	Lead
October 2020	IPSOS	23%	18%	4%	2%	1%	1%	1%	1%	3%		41%	5%
October 2020	Public Opinion Strategies	56%	19.9%	4.3%	2.2%	4.6%	1.6%	N/A	3%	3.9%		4.5%	36.1%
October 2020	Survation	55%	22%	4%	2%	3%	N/A	N/A	2%	4%		8%	33%
October 2020	European Georgia	27%	19%	11.7%	4.1%	1.4%	N/A	1.9%	4.0%	5.1%		15.3%	8.8%
October 2020	IPSOS	26.2%	17.8%	5.3%	2.1%	1.2%	0.7%	0.5%	2.7%	2.7%		34%	8.4%
October 2020	Edison Research	36%	17%	5%	3%	3%	1%	1%	2%	2%		24%	19%
October 2020	IPSOS	24.5%	17.4%	6.9%	1.9%	1.7%	1.0%	1.0%	1.7%	3.4%		33%	7.1%
September 2020	IPSOS	25%	15.5%	5%	3%	3%	2.5%	1.5%	2.5%	2%		33%	9.5%
September 2020	Edison Research	38%	15%	6%	3%	3%	1%	1%	3%	3%		23%	23%
August 2020	Edison Research	38%	16%	6%	3%	3%	2%	3%	5%	5%		15%	22%
August 2020	IRI	33%	16%	5%	3%	3%	1%	2%	2%	4%		29%	17%
July 2020	Edison Research	39%	16%	5%	3%	3%	1%	0%	2%	3%	1% (Note: the Development Movement was dissolved in December 2019, with most of its members joining Lelo for Georgia.)	27%	23%
February 2020	Edison Research	37%	22%	8%	6%	6%	2%	3%	2%	7%	3%	4%	15%
February 2020	Ipsos	34%	24%	10%	6%	5%	2%	3%	3%	8%		5%	10%
January 2020	Ipsos	22%	17%	9%	4%	4%	2%	2%	2%	6%		32%	5%
December 2019	NDI	20%	13%	8%	5%	4%	2%	3%	2%	5%		38%	7%
October 2019	IRI	23%	15%	5%	5%	4%	2%	4%	2%	7%		33%	8%
October 2019	Edison Research	26%	18%	7%	4%	4%	2%	3%	3%	4%	2%	27%	8%
September 2019	IRI	23%	15%	5%	5%	4%	2%	3%	2%	3%	2%	36%	8%
June 2019	IRI	26%	22%	7%	5%	5%	2%	2%	1%	-	-	30%	4%
May 2019	Ipsos	29%	22%	10%	5%	5%	<3%	<3%	<3%	-	-	>20%	7%
April 2019	NDI	17%	14%	3%	<3%	3%	<3%	<3%	<3%	-	-	>51%	3%
December 2018	NDI	24%	11%	3%	<3%	3%	<3%	<3%	<3%	-	-	>47%	13%
28 October 2018	Presidential elections	38%	37%	10%	3%	-	-	-	2%	-	2%	8%	1%
June–July 2018	NDI	20%	11%	4%	3%	<3%	<3%	<3%	<3%	-	-	>50%	9%
10-22 April 2018	IRI	27%	17%	7%	5%	4%	3%	<3%	<3%	-	-	>31%	10%
March–April 2018	NDI	31%	9%	5%	3%	3%	<3%	<3%	<3%	-	-	>40%	22%
November–December 2017	NDI	27%	10%	3%	<3%	3%	<3%	<3%	<3%	-	-	>45%	17%
21 October 2017	Local elections	55%	17%	10%	3%	6%	3%	-	-	-	1%	5%	38%
18 June–9 July 2017	NDI	27%	8%	3%	<3%	<3%	<3%	<3%	<3%	-	-	>47%	19%
22 February–8 March 2017	IRI	30%	15%	8%	6%	4%	3%	<3%	<3%	-	-	>28%	15%
8 October 2016	Parliamentary elections	49%	27%	–	3%	5%	4%	–	–	–	–	12%	21%

== Conduct ==
Al Jazeera correspondent Robin Forestier-Walker reported that most voters were able to cast their ballots "safely and freely", although there were incidents of violence. The OSCE Parliamentary Assembly stated that "elections were competitive", while also reported "pervasive allegations of pressure on voters and blurring of the line between the ruling party and the state". The United States embassy in Georgia, commenting on the OSCE statement, said: "We call on all parties to address these deficiencies in advance of the second round and in future elections. These efforts to corrupt the electoral process through voter intimidation, vote buying, interfering with ballot secrecy, blurring of party and official activities, and violence against election observers and journalists, while not sufficient to invalidate the results, continue to mar Georgia's electoral process and are unacceptable."

== Results ==
Four exit polls showed ruling Georgian Dream leading in the elections. An exit poll conducted by Imedi TV showed Georgian Dream leading with 55% of votes, while according to polls conducted by Rustavi 2 showed GD securing 52.26% of votes cast. Mtavari Arkhi and Formula TV consecutively showed the party winning 41% and 46% of votes. Shortly after, Georgian Dream declared victory. However, the opposition refused to concede defeat and claimed that they had secured enough votes to form a coalition government. UNM leader David Kirtadze said, "This is not a real picture."

Party	Proportional			Constituency (first round)			Constituency (second round)			Total seats	+/–
Party	Votes	%	Seats	Votes	%	Seats	Votes	%	Seats	Total seats	+/–
Georgian Dream	928,004	48.22	60	938,634	49.79	13	491,408	90.62	17	90	–25
Strength is in Unity	523,127	27.18	36	492,951	26.15	0	39,587	7.30	0	36	+9
European Georgia — Movement for Liberty	72,986	3.79	5	105,010	5.57	0	3,105	0.57	0	5	New
Lelo	60,712	3.15	4	79,091	4.20	0				4	New
Strategy Aghmashenebeli	60,671	3.15	4	11,379	0.60	0				4	New
Alliance of Patriots of Georgia	60,480	3.14	4	59,597	3.16	0				4	–2
Girchi	55,598	2.89	4	21,062	1.12	0	3,188	0.59	0	4	New
Citizens	25,508	1.33	2	18,397	0.98	0	2,770	0.51	0	2	New
Georgian Labour Party	19,314	1.00	1	23,849	1.27	0	2,223	0.41	0	1	+1
Democratic Movement – United Georgia	16,286	0.85	0	1,829	0.10	0				0	0
Tribuna – Christian Democratic Movement	9,896	0.51	0	9,394	0.50	0				0	New
Solidarity Alliance of Georgia	8,335	0.43	0	16,747	0.89	0				0	New
Georgian Idea	8,263	0.43	0	10,249	0.54	0				0	0
Free Georgia	6,393	0.33	0	9,574	0.51	0				0	New
Free Democrats	5,188	0.27	0	1,317	0.07	0				0	0
National Democratic Movement	4,850	0.25	0	2,467	0.13	0				0	New
Georgian March	4,753	0.25	0	6,873	0.36	0				0	New
Social Democrats for the Development of Georgia	4,413	0.23	0							0	New
Victorious Georgia	3,750	0.19	0	7,892	0.42	0				0	New
Political Movement of Veterans and Patriots	3,245	0.17	0	2,584	0.14	0				0	New
Conservative Party of Georgia	3,124	0.16	0	2,274	0.12	0				0	New
For Social Justice	2,885	0.15	0							0	New
Tavisupleba	2,841	0.15	0	2,402	0.13	0				0	New
For United Georgia	2,728	0.14	0	3,627	0.19	0				0	0
Future Georgia	2,206	0.11	0	1,665	0.09	0				0	New
Georgian Choice	2,165	0.11	0	3,117	0.17	0				0	New
Tetrebi	2,103	0.11	0	2,331	0.12	0				0	New
Repormeri	2,063	0.11	0	2,157	0.11	0				0	New
For Justice (Georgia)	1,979	0.10	0	1,217	0.06	0				0	New
Georgian Roots	1,914	0.10	0	1,770	0.09	0				0	New
Reformers	1,658	0.09	0							0	New
The Way of Zviad	1,563	0.08	0	210	0.01	0				0	0
Development Party of Georgia	1,549	0.08	0	305	0.02	0				0	New
New Power	1,458	0.08	0	1,812	0.10	0				0	New
Greens Party of Georgia	1,305	0.07	0	3,234	0.17	0				0	New
Change Georgia	1,292	0.07	0	3,941	0.21	0				0	New
Georgia	1,189	0.06	0	3,072	0.16	0				0	0
Industry Will Save Georgia	1,048	0.05	0							0	–1
People's Party	1,005	0.05	0	449	0.02	0				0	0
Georgian Troupe	982	0.05	0	927	0.05	0				0	0
Progressive Georgia	980	0.05	0	2,095	0.11	0				0	New
Movement for a Free Georgia	739	0.04	0							0	New
Workers' Socialist Party	610	0.03	0	719	0.04	0				0	New
Order of Mamulishvili "Samshlo"	583	0.03	0							0	New
Choice for the Homeland	536	0.03	0							0	New
Traditionalists	479	0.02	0	125	0.01	0				0	New
New Christian Democrats	460	0.02	0							0	New
Euro-Atlantic Vector	424	0.02	0	145	0.01	0				0	New
National Democratic Party	421	0.02	0							0	New
People's Movement Christian-Democrats	334	0.02	0							0	New
Independents				28,787	1.53	0				0	–1
Total	1,924,395	100.00	120	1,885,277	100.00	13	542,281	100.00	17	150	0
Valid votes	1,924,395	96.56		1,885,277	95.19		542,281	95.87			
Invalid/blank votes	68,496	3.44		95,367	4.81		23,361	4.13			
Total votes	1,992,891	100.00		1,980,644	100.00		565,642	100.00			
Registered voters/turnout	3,578,070	55.70		3,511,853	56.40		2,140,210	26.43			
Source: CESKO

=== Proportional results by constituency ===
Constituency (Note: Each territory listed refers to either a district of Tbilisi or a municipality, if not noted otherwise)		Turnout	GD	UNM	EG	Lelo	SA	APG	Girchi	Citizens	GLP	Others	Lead
1	Mtatsminda, Krtsanisi	54.91	43.14	22.72	4.40	5.52	2.80	3.21	6.41	2.59	0.79	8.42	20.42
2	Vake	60.09	41.14	18.69	4.59	7.87	2.62	3.12	9.05	3.49	0.60	8.83	22.45
3	Saburtalo	57.80	41.11	19.68	3.55	7.32	2.89	3.22	8.13	4.74	0.72	8.64	21.43
4	Isani	49.50	42.44	23.78	2.65	3.20	8.29	3.39	4.99	2.34	1.00	7.92	18.66
5	Samgori	50.85	42.14	27.99	2.61	3.14	4.90	3.83	4.57	2.31	1.10	7.41	14.15
6	Didube, Chughureti	56.33	44.52	20.46	3.19	5.55	3.38	3.17	8.02	3.07	0.87	7.77	24.06
7	Nadzaladevi	52.12	41.73	22.61	2.55	4.56	3.97	4.79	6.35	3.05	2.84	7.55	19.12
8	Gldani	52.13	39.08	28.80	3.11	3.46	4.28	3.91	5.38	2.86	1.25	7.87	10.28
9	Sagarejo, Gurjaani, Sighnaghi, Dedoplistskaro	59.18	52.69	27.51	5.06	2.62	2.22	3.71	1.08	0.58	0.99	3.54	25.18
10	Lagodekhi, Kvareli, Telavi, Akhmeta	59.49	45.78	36.86	2.95	1.70	2.03	2.89	1.13	0.69	1.25	4.72	8.92
11	Mtskheta, Tianeti, Dusheti, Kazbegi	60.62	51.34	25.50	2.32	2.27	2.42	4.33	1.55	0.85	2.08	7.34	25.84
12	Rustavi; part of Gardabani	55.80	44.22	30.04	3.06	2.57	3.58	3.68	4.11	1.37	1.60	5.77	14.18
13	Marneuli; part of Gardabani	45.21	49.57	38.42	3.13	0.94	1.07	0.82	0.24	0.09	0.74	4.98	11.15
14	Bolnisi, Dmanisi, Tsalka, Tetritskaro	52.00	56.95	31.23	2.00	1.71	1.40	1.67	0.60	0.33	0.40	3.71	25.72
15	Kaspi; most of Gori	57.42	51.91	27.92	2.38	2.24	2.53	3.95	1.77	0.85	1.12	5.33	23.99
16	Khashuri, Kareli; part of Gori	58.71	48.24	28.58	1.95	4.19	3.10	3.69	1.48	0.94	1.11	6.72	19.66
17	Borjomi, Akhaltsikhe, Adigeni, Aspindza	64.27	59.12	23.03	3.42	1.65	2.26	3.78	1.08	0.46	0.85	4.35	36.09
18	Akhalkalaki, Ninotsminda	55.70	66.77	3.92	8.45	2.69	2.38	7.46	0.10	0.09	0.49	7.65	58.32
19	Oni, Ambrolauri, Tsageri, Lentekhi, Mestia	62.99	59.00	14.77	4.40	5.42	3.00	4.08	0.80	0.65	1.07	6.81	44.23
20	Kharagauli, Sachkhere, Chiatura	61.91	69.53	13.29	2.75	2.34	2.33	3.77	0.93	0.43	0.56	4.07	56.24
21	Terjola, Zestaponi, Baghdati, Tkibuli	60.58	48.28	26.43	9.06	2.77	3.02	2.38	1.15	0.59	0.92	5.40	21.85
22	Vani, Samtredia, Khoni, Tskaltubo	59.26	51.90	26.31	7.64	2.19	3.40	2.13	0.78	0.72	0.76	4.17	25.59
23	Kutaisi	47.89	41.30	30.12	3.80	3.01	6.82	2.21	3.12	1.23	1.47	6.92	11.18
24	Ozurgeti, Lanchkhuti, Chokhatauri	61.08	54.87	20.88	5.08	2.82	2.68	3.52	1.26	0.74	1.08	7.07	33.99
25	Abasha, Martvili, Tsalenjikha, Chkhorotsqu	60.18	49.36	32.85	3.41	1.82	2.78	2.71	0.82	0.18	0.68	5.39	16.51
26	Senaki, Khobi, Poti	58.40	52.33	28.55	4.41	1.51	2.86	1.54	1.46	0.32	0.85	6.17	23.78
27	Zugdidi	46.17	46.60	38.45	4.28	1.83	1.87	1.07	1.04	0.20	0.56	4.10	8.15
28	Batumi	55.14	41.97	34.54	2.40	3.48	4.02	2.65	2.90	1.20	0.69	6.15	7.43
29	Kobuleti; part of Khelvachauri	61.00	49.13	35.54	1.64	1.60	1.92	2.85	0.75	0.36	0.49	5.72	13.59
30	Keda, Shuakhevi, Khelvachauri, Khulo	63.85	46.97	32.33	3.98	3.07	2.45	3.81	0.66	0.22	0.45	6.06	14.64
0	Abroad	N/A	29.03	45.57	3.19	3.00	1.95	0.56	8.07	2.25	1.09	5.29	16.54
Source: CEC CEC CEC

=== Constituency results ===
District Nº 1
Candidate	Party	First round		Second round	
Candidate	Party	Votes	%	Votes	%
Beka Odisharia	Georgian Dream	22,315	45.61	18,769	91.57
Shalva Shavgulidze	European Georgia — Movement for Liberty	14,254	29.14	1,727	8.43
Saba Buadze	Lelo	4,593	9.39		
Malkhaz Topuria	Alliance of Patriots of Georgia	1,871	3.82		
Jaba Jishk'ariani	Solidarity Alliance of Georgia	1,736	3.55		
K'oba Amirkhanashvili	Tribuna – Christian Democratic Movement	724	1.48		
Goga Mgaloblishvili	Georgian March	590	1.21		
Ia Rcheulishvili	Georgian Idea	488	1.00		
Ani Japaridze	Repormeri	484	0.99		
Irak'li Jalaghonia	Free Georgia	408	0.83		
Maia Lip'art'eliani	Future Georgia	354	0.72		
Nat'alia P'ap'ashvili	Progressive Georgia	302	0.62		
Teimuraz Tsagareishvili	Greens Party of Georgia	277	0.57		
Maia Siradze	Georgian Troupe	154	0.31		
Lasha Bregvadze	Euro-Atlantic Vector	145	0.30		
Nat'alia K'amoza	Change Georgia	133	0.27		
Besik'i Adamia	Georgia	93	0.19		
Total		48,921	100.00	20,496	100.00
Valid votes		48,921	92.18	20,496	94.83
Invalid/blank votes		4,152	7.82	1,118	5.17
Total votes		53,073	100.00	21,614	100.00
Registered voters/turnout		95,665	55.48	95,634	22.60

District Nº 2
Candidate	Party	First round		Second round	
Candidate	Party	Votes	%	Votes	%
Nodar T'urdzeladze	Georgian Dream	25,333	42.21	20,549	93.72
Elene Khosht'aria	European Georgia — Movement for Liberty	21,320	35.52	1,378	6.28
Levani K'oberidze	Lelo	4,563	7.60		
Nana Devdariani	Alliance of Patriots of Georgia	1,928	3.21		
Beka Natsvlishvili	Solidarity Alliance of Georgia	1,569	2.61		
K'akha K'uk'ava	Free Georgia	1,312	2.19		
Bidzina Gegidze	Independent	788	1.31		
Giorgi Gachechiladze	Greens Party of Georgia	427	0.71		
Gega Khvedelidze	Georgian Idea	373	0.62		
Levani Chkheidze	Tribuna – Christian Democratic Movement	353	0.59		
Jondo Baghaturia	Georgian Troupe	337	0.56		
Guram Sagharadze	Georgian March	308	0.51		
Maia K'uk'ava	Repormeri	288	0.48		
Tengiz T'q'eshelashvili	Development Party of Georgia	165	0.27		
Khatuna Saginashvili	Conservative Party of Georgia	137	0.23		
Roin Lip'art'eliani	Future Georgia	134	0.22		
Irak'li Mach'avariani	Traditionalists	125	0.21		
Nana Ts'itelashvili	Political Movement of Veterans and Patriots	124	0.21		
K'onst'ant'ine Bukurauli	New Power	117	0.19		
Nino Kareli	Change Georgia	109	0.18		
Davit Dadiani	Progressive Georgia	103	0.17		
Mamuk'a Melikishvili	Georgia	67	0.11		
Megi Aghap'ishvili	Georgian Choice	36	0.06		
Total		60,016	100.00	21,927	100.00
Valid votes		60,016	95.27	21,927	96.50
Invalid/blank votes		2,977	4.73	796	3.50
Total votes		62,993	100.00	22,723	100.00
Registered voters/turnout		104,085	60.52	104,089	21.83

District Nº 3
Candidate	Party	First round		Second round	
Candidate	Party	Votes	%	Votes	%
Davit Sergeenk'o	Georgian Dream	32,066	43.81	24,700	89.92
Aleksandre Elisashvili	Citizens	14,181	19.38	2,770	10.08
Badri Japaridze	Lelo	10,259	14.02		
Irak'li Okruashvili	Victorious Georgia	4,531	6.19		
Tamar Chark'viani	Strategy Aghmashenebeli	3,796	5.19		
Levan Gogichaishvili	Solidarity Alliance of Georgia	1,878	2.57		
K'akhaber Dzagania	Alliance of Patriots of Georgia	1,708	2.33		
Vit'ali Daraselia	Free Democrats	597	0.82		
Anzor Sak'andelidze	Georgian Idea	534	0.73		
Zurab Nizharadze	Tribuna – Christian Democratic Movement	505	0.69		
Tamari Maq'ashvili	Independent	471	0.64		
Vakht'ang Gvazava	National Democratic Movement	353	0.48		
Aleksandre Gakharia	New Power	289	0.39		
Roini Khijak'adze	Free Georgia	287	0.39		
Mikheil K'okhreidze	Repormeri	279	0.38		
Mikheil Ch'avch'anidze	Georgian March	264	0.36		
Irak'li Avalishvili	Future Georgia	242	0.33		
Zaza Neparidze	Political Movement of Veterans and Patriots	230	0.31		
Tamaz Ints'k'irveli	Greens Party of Georgia	210	0.29		
Giorgi Liluashvili	Georgia	134	0.18		
Merab Khantadze	Workers' Socialist Party	124	0.17		
Iana K'amoza	Change Georgia	98	0.13		
Nik'oloz Leluashvili	Progressive Georgia	91	0.12		
P'aat'a Devsurashvili	Georgian Choice	65	0.09		
Total		73,192	100.00	27,470	100.00
Valid votes		73,192	94.04	27,470	97.16
Invalid/blank votes		4,637	5.96	803	2.84
Total votes		77,829	100.00	28,273	100.00
Registered voters/turnout		133,401	58.34	133,413	21.19

District Nº 4
Candidate	Party	First round		Second round	
Candidate	Party	Votes	%	Votes	%
K'akha K'akhishvili	Georgian Dream	26,154	48.14	22,055	92.15
Khat'ia Dek'anoidze	Strength is in Unity	14,658	26.98	1,879	7.85
Giorgi Vashadze	Strategy Aghmashenebeli	7,583	13.96		
Davit Ch'ich'inadze	Tribuna – Christian Democratic Movement	1,880	3.46		
Lana Galdava	Lelo	1,877	3.46		
Ilia Khmaladze	Georgian Idea	306	0.56		
Aleksandre Chargeishvili	Georgian March	272	0.50		
K'akha Nadiradze	Solidarity Alliance of Georgia	264	0.49		
Giorgi Avazashvili	Repormeri	238	0.44		
Eduardi Eloshvili	Free Democrats	209	0.38		
Davit Chigogidze	Tavisupleba	206	0.38		
Badri Manizhashvili	Greens Party of Georgia	168	0.31		
Jumber Bolghashvili	Tetrebi	154	0.28		
Sopio Dilebashvili	Change Georgia	141	0.26		
Gocha Shoshiashvili	Georgia	122	0.22		
Noe Gogiashvili	Progressive Georgia	94	0.17		
Total		54,326	100.00	23,934	100.00
Valid votes		54,326	94.58	23,934	96.25
Invalid/blank votes		3,116	5.42	933	3.75
Total votes		57,442	100.00	24,867	100.00
Registered voters/turnout		114,615	50.12	114,609	21.70

District Nº 5
Candidate	Party	First round		Second round	
Candidate	Party	Votes	%	Votes	%
Sozar Subari	Georgian Dream	32,199	45.82	27,993	88.68
Levan Khabeishvili	Strength is in Unity	27,506	39.14	3,573	11.32
Pikria Chikhradze	Lelo	3,283	4.67		
Guram Nik'olaishvili	Alliance of Patriots of Georgia	2,570	3.66		
Guram Palavandishvili	Georgian Idea	626	0.89		
Vazha Zhvania	Tribuna – Christian Democratic Movement	563	0.80		
Irak'li Shikhiashvili	Georgian March	551	0.78		
Aleksandre Rizhamadze	Solidarity Alliance of Georgia	509	0.72		
Lali Peradze	Free Georgia	470	0.67		
Giorgi Khosit'ashvili	Tavisupleba	337	0.48		
Ilia Mach'arashvili	People's Party	288	0.41		
Manana Boch'orishvili	Greens Party of Georgia	271	0.39		
Nugzari K'elep't'rishvili	Change Georgia	262	0.37		
Iosebi Darsavelidze	For Justice	221	0.31		
Gocha Kharauli	Georgia	207	0.29		
Bezhan Gunava	Georgian Choice	206	0.29		
K'akhaber Mumladze	Progressive Georgia	202	0.29		
Total		70,271	100.00	31,566	100.00
Valid votes		70,271	94.47	31,566	94.84
Invalid/blank votes		4,117	5.53	1,716	5.16
Total votes		74,388	100.00	33,282	100.00
Registered voters/turnout		145,779	51.03	145,772	22.83

District Nº 6
Candidate	Party	First round		Second round	
Candidate	Party	Votes	%	Votes	%
Giorgi Volsk'i	Georgian Dream	29,414	42.64	28,522	89.95
Zurab Girchi Japaridze	Girchi	14,529	21.06	3,188	10.05
Ana Dolidze	Independent	12,381	17.95		
Levan Samushia	Lelo	4,419	6.41		
Archil Benidze	Alliance of Patriots of Georgia	1,802	2.61		
Dimit'ri Lortkipanidze	Independent	1,437	2.08		
Gedevan Popkhadze	Solidarity Alliance of Georgia	866	1.26		
Mikheil Kavtaradze	Tribuna – Christian Democratic Movement	733	1.06		
Giorgi Kajaia	Independent	650	0.94		
Davit Khizanishvili	Future Georgia	536	0.78		
Tengiz Omanidze	Free Georgia	363	0.53		
Otar Baghaturia	Tavisupleba	290	0.42		
Tamar Ch'ich'inadze	Greens Party of Georgia	289	0.42		
Tsira Javakhishvili	Georgian March	211	0.31		
Giga Gigauri	New Power	207	0.30		
Davit Shalut'ashvili	Repormeri	202	0.29		
Davit Osepashvili	Georgian Troupe	186	0.27		
Giorgi Otarashvili	Change Georgia	183	0.27		
Giorgi Pitskhelauri	Georgia	176	0.26		
Manana Mosulishvili	Georgian Choice	103	0.15		
Total		68,977	100.00	31,710	100.00
Valid votes		68,977	94.08	31,710	95.79
Invalid/blank votes		4,342	5.92	1,392	4.21
Total votes		73,319	100.00	33,102	100.00
Registered voters/turnout		128,792	56.93	128,741	25.71

District Nº 7
Candidate	Party	First round		Second round	
Candidate	Party	Votes	%	Votes	%
Mikheil Q'avelashvili	Georgian Dream	28,584	43.72	23,629	91.40
Shalva Natelashvili	Georgian Labour Party	16,339	24.99	2,223	8.60
Nik'oloz Cherkezishvili	Lelo	5,661	8.66		
Irma Inashvili	Alliance of Patriots of Georgia	4,990	7.63		
Irak'li Gujabidze	Independent	3,195	4.89		
Lia Mukhashavria	Tribuna – Christian Democratic Movement	2,128	3.25		
Guladi Q'ruashvili	Free Georgia	610	0.93		
P'aat'a Gogshelidze	Georgian Idea	588	0.90		
Zviadi Tavadze	Solidarity Alliance of Georgia	500	0.76		
Giorgi Gigauri	Georgian March	469	0.72		
Davit Gogit'ashvili	Political Movement of Veterans and Patriots	385	0.59		
Guram Nik'oleishvili	Greens Party of Georgia	372	0.57		
Aleksandre Bardadze	New Power	355	0.54		
Darejan Gagnidze	Change Georgia	336	0.51		
Gia Nemsadze	Workers' Socialist Party	309	0.47		
Lali Maisuradze	Georgia	238	0.36		
Mariami Suladze	Georgian Troupe	165	0.25		
Gaiozi Chark'viani	Progressive Georgia	160	0.24		
Total		65,384	100.00	25,852	100.00
Valid votes		65,384	92.47	25,852	95.41
Invalid/blank votes		5,322	7.53	1,244	4.59
Total votes		70,706	100.00	27,096	100.00
Registered voters/turnout		135,008	52.37	134,976	20.07

District Nº 8
Candidate	Party	First round		Second round	
Candidate	Party	Votes	%	Votes	%
Nik'anor Melia	Strength is in Unity	31,391	44.06	3,032	10.64
Levan K'obiashvili	Georgian Dream	30,261	42.47	25,474	89.36
Merab Ch'ikashvili	Alliance of Patriots of Georgia	2,879	4.04		
Gigla Mikaut'adze	Lelo	2,610	3.66		
Aleksandre Razmadze	Georgian Idea	645	0.91		
Zviad T'omaradze	Political Movement of Veterans and Patriots	559	0.78		
Khat'ia Kobalia	Repormeri	429	0.60		
Lasha Giorgadze	Solidarity Alliance of Georgia	386	0.54		
K'akhaber K'obakhidze	Georgian March	334	0.47		
Romani Palelashvili	For United Georgia	317	0.44		
Salome Megrelishvili	Change Georgia	261	0.37		
Merab Sharabidze	Greens Party of Georgia	239	0.34		
Grigoli Benidze	Conservative Party of Georgia	226	0.32		
Shota Mach'arashvili	New Power	225	0.32		
Nugzar Lomishvili	For Justice	212	0.30		
Goderdzi Lomtatidze	Georgia	146	0.20		
K'akhaber K'alashovi	Progressive Georgia	131	0.18		
Total		71,251	100.00	28,506	100.00
Valid votes		71,251	93.62	28,506	95.13
Invalid/blank votes		4,856	6.38	1,458	4.87
Total votes		76,107	100.00	29,964	100.00
Registered voters/turnout		146,008	52.13	145,978	20.53

District Nº 9
Candidate	Party	Votes	%
Davit Songhulashvili	Georgian Dream	45,250	52.97
Levan Bezhashvili	Strength is in Unity	23,980	28.07
Giorgi Ghviniashvili	European Georgia — Movement for Liberty	7,079	8.29
Ek'at'erine Kvlividze	Lelo	3,156	3.69
Soslan Garsevanishvili	Alliance of Patriots of Georgia	3,060	3.58
Ivane Datuashvili	Tribuna – Christian Democratic Movement	346	0.41
Giorgi Makharashvili	Georgian Idea	298	0.35
Malkhaz Pilauri	Free Georgia	296	0.35
Aleksi Arabuli	Georgian March	277	0.32
Nugzar Ch'iaberashvili	For United Georgia	276	0.32
Daviti Ch'uniashvili	Free Democrats	241	0.28
Ia Goderdzishvili	Georgian Roots	185	0.22
Elene Kurtiashvili	Solidarity Alliance of Georgia	179	0.21
Davit Tskhvariashvili	Greens Party of Georgia	168	0.20
Vakhusht'i Kiziq'urashvili	Future Georgia	167	0.20
Irak'li K'ok'ilashvili	Change Georgia	138	0.16
Amiran Luashvili	Workers' Socialist Party	121	0.14
Aleksi K'obaidze	Progressive Georgia	104	0.12
Tamar Pkhovelishvili	Georgia	103	0.12
Total		85,424	100.00
Valid votes		85,424	96.18
Invalid/blank votes		3,390	3.82
Total votes		88,814	100.00
Registered voters/turnout		149,542	59.39

District Nº 10
Candidate	Party	First round		Second round	
Candidate	Party	Votes	%	Votes	%
Irak'li Kadagishvili	Georgian Dream	41,662	47.26	44,616	88.83
Giorgi Bot'k'oveli	Strength is in Unity	35,645	40.43	5,608	11.17
Zurab Ch'iaberashvili	European Georgia — Movement for Liberty	3,348	3.80		
Ioseb P'arts'ik'anashvili	Alliance of Patriots of Georgia	2,625	2.98		
Irak'li T'alakhadze	Lelo	1,379	1.56		
Nik'oloz Vardoshvili	Georgian Labour Party	1,003	1.14		
Emzari Kvariani	Political Movement of Veterans and Patriots	525	0.60		
Aleksandre Palavandishvili	Georgian Idea	403	0.46		
Giorgi Javakhishvili	Georgian Choice	335	0.38		
Maia Ts'ereteli	Free Georgia	249	0.28		
Giorgi Sulkhanishvili	Georgian Roots	234	0.27		
Tengiz Ketelauri	Georgian March	228	0.26		
Zizi Gagnidze	Change Georgia	135	0.15		
Mikheil Janezashvili	New Power	126	0.14		
Lali Bunt'uri	Georgia	117	0.13		
Leila Kharaishvili	Georgian Troupe	85	0.10		
Vladimeri Gurjidze	Progressive Georgia	61	0.07		
Total		88,160	100.00	50,224	100.00
Valid votes		88,160	96.01	50,224	96.26
Invalid/blank votes		3,664	3.99	1,949	3.74
Total votes		91,824	100.00	52,173	100.00
Registered voters/turnout		153,609	59.78	153,576	33.97

District Nº 11
Candidate	Party	First round		Second round	
Candidate	Party	Votes	%	Votes	%
Shalva K'ereselidze	Georgian Dream	25,194	49.67	25,728	92.53
Tsezar Chocheli	Strength is in Unity	17,134	33.78	2,076	7.47
Tamaz Mech'iauri	For United Georgia	2,613	5.15		
Ioseb Shat'berashvili	Alliance of Patriots of Georgia	1,715	3.38		
Beka Natelashvili	Georgian Labour Party	1,339	2.64		
Malkhaz Vakht'angashvili	Lelo	875	1.73		
Vazha Chokheli	Tribuna – Christian Democratic Movement	500	0.99		
Ek'a Beselia	For Justice	360	0.71		
Badri Davituri	Georgian Idea	272	0.54		
Vakht'ang Mart'olek'i	Free Democrats	158	0.31		
Giorgi Lapanashvili	Georgian March	153	0.30		
Bak'uri Buchuk'uri	Repormeri	137	0.27		
Giorgi Abzhandadze	Free Georgia	114	0.22		
Vakht'ang Imerlishvili	Change Georgia	97	0.19		
Deniza Sumbadze	Georgia	62	0.12		
Total		50,723	100.00	27,804	100.00
Valid votes		50,723	94.73	27,804	96.81
Invalid/blank votes		2,821	5.27	916	3.19
Total votes		53,544	100.00	28,720	100.00
Registered voters/turnout		87,986	60.86	87,959	32.65

District Nº 12
Candidate	Party	First round		Second round	
Candidate	Party	Votes	%	Votes	%
Nino Latsabidze	Georgian Dream	35,428	47.31	35,297	89.79
Davit K'irk'it'adze	Strength is in Unity	24,418	32.61	4,012	10.21
Irma Nadirashvili	European Georgia — Movement for Liberty	3,089	4.13		
P'aat'a Jibladze	Alliance of Patriots of Georgia	2,578	3.44		
Vakht'ang Megrelishvili	Girchi	2,468	3.30		
Grigol Gegelia	Lelo	2,043	2.73		
Mikheil Kumsishvili	Georgian Labour Party	1,171	1.56		
Besik' Chubinidze	Georgian Roots	683	0.91		
Zaza Margvelani	Georgian Idea	519	0.69		
Gela Nak'ashidze	Independent	500	0.67		
Malkhazi Gorgaslidze	Tavisupleba	371	0.50		
Lasha Mach'arashvili	Free Georgia	343	0.46		
Ilia Lobzhanidze	Solidarity Alliance of Georgia	260	0.35		
Aleksandre K'obaidze	Progressive Georgia	222	0.30		
Davit Suarishvili	Georgian March	209	0.28		
Giorgi Maisuradze	Georgia	173	0.23		
Luara Nizharadze	Tetrebi	154	0.21		
Ek'at'erine Okrotsvaridze	Change Georgia	130	0.17		
Shorena Mamalashvili	Georgian Choice	124	0.17		
Total		74,883	100.00	39,309	100.00
Valid votes		74,883	95.05	39,309	94.91
Invalid/blank votes		3,901	4.95	2,108	5.09
Total votes		78,784	100.00	41,417	100.00
Registered voters/turnout		141,453	55.70	141,463	29.28

District Nº 13
Candidate	Party	Votes	%
Zaur Dargali	Georgian Dream	31,078	51.43
Azer Suleimanovi	Strength is in Unity	23,502	38.89
Ak'mamed Imamk'ulievi	European Georgia — Movement for Liberty	2,216	3.67
Olegi Devadze	Georgian Idea	999	1.65
Murad Muradovi	Lelo	632	1.05
Makhir Iusubovi	Alliance of Patriots of Georgia	620	1.03
Ali Badirovi	Georgian Labour Party	554	0.92
Ashot' Muradiani	Tribuna – Christian Democratic Movement	233	0.39
Tamar Ch'onishvili	Solidarity Alliance of Georgia	161	0.27
Isp'andiar Karimovi	Georgian March	154	0.25
Nat'alia Gelazonia	Free Georgia	109	0.18
Avtandil Okrotsvaridze	Change Georgia	98	0.16
Gajar Guseinovi	Progressive Georgia	48	0.08
Giulsapa Aivazova	Georgia	21	0.03
Total		60,425	100.00
Valid votes		60,425	95.35
Invalid/blank votes		2,950	4.65
Total votes		63,375	100.00
Registered voters/turnout		138,121	45.88

District Nº 14
Candidate	Party	Votes	%
Gogi Meshveliani	Georgian Dream	33,177	55.44
K'akhaber Okriashvili	Strength is in Unity	23,666	39.55
Giorgi Ch'elidze	Lelo	882	1.47
Maia Tsabut'ashvili	Alliance of Patriots of Georgia	668	1.12
Mamuk'a Chokuri	Georgian March	400	0.67
Giorgi Shavreshiani	Georgian Choice	271	0.45
Temur Ts'ik'lauri	Georgian Labour Party	218	0.36
Darejan P'et'riashvili	Free Georgia	120	0.20
Guram Padarashvili	Free Democrats	112	0.19
Robert' Gvarliani	Progressive Georgia	100	0.17
Ketevan Q'andashvili	Change Georgia	96	0.16
Amiran K'ort'i	Solidarity Alliance of Georgia	88	0.15
Vikt'or K'usiani	Georgia	40	0.07
Total		59,838	100.00
Valid votes		59,838	95.66
Invalid/blank votes		2,716	4.34
Total votes		62,554	100.00
Registered voters/turnout		120,521	51.90

District Nº 15
Candidate	Party	Votes	%
Giorgi Khojevanishvili	Georgian Dream	41,333	55.58
Badri Basishvili	Strength is in Unity	20,790	27.96
K'oba Mazanashvili	Alliance of Patriots of Georgia	2,940	3.95
Irak'li Okruashvili	Victorious Georgia	2,623	3.53
P'ap'una K'oberidze	Lelo	2,495	3.36
Levan Tarkhnishvili	European Georgia — Movement for Liberty	2,205	2.97
Aleksandre Vashaq'madze	Georgian Idea	443	0.60
Nana Aghordzineba	Free Georgia	358	0.48
Zaza Mezvrishvili	Tavisupleba	298	0.40
Emzari Sabanadze	Solidarity Alliance of Georgia	290	0.39
Mariami Khorguashvili	Change Georgia	279	0.38
Besik' Bogveli	People's Party	161	0.22
Iosebi Vardanidze	Georgia	148	0.20
Total		74,363	100.00
Valid votes		74,363	95.20
Invalid/blank votes		3,748	4.80
Total votes		78,111	100.00
Registered voters/turnout		135,795	57.52

District Nº 16
Candidate	Party	First round		Second round	
Candidate	Party	Votes	%	Votes	%
Zaal Dugladze	Georgian Dream	28,925	49.32	30,602	91.72
Nat'o Chkheidze	Strength is in Unity	17,536	29.90	2,763	8.28
K'akha K'ozhoridze	Lelo	5,248	8.95		
Elibo P'at'urashvili	Alliance of Patriots of Georgia	2,032	3.46		
Aleksi Chkhik'vadze	Democratic Movement – United Georgia	1,216	2.07		
Nik'a Mosiashvili	Girchi	779	1.33		
Dimit'ri Ghonghadze	National Democratic Movement	744	1.27		
Khatuna Gelashvili	Free Georgia	541	0.92		
Guram Chalagashvili	Victorious Georgia	350	0.60		
Levani Kveladze	Georgian Idea	255	0.43		
Tamaz Chaduneli	For United Georgia	217	0.37		
P'aat'a Shubitidze	Tavisupleba	196	0.33		
Zviad Gelashvili	Georgian March	148	0.25		
Merab Zurabashvili	Change Georgia	145	0.25		
Rat'i Suladze	Political Movement of Veterans and Patriots	108	0.18		
Besik' Buturishvili	Solidarity Alliance of Georgia	107	0.18		
Irina Tsaava	Georgia	101	0.17		
Total		58,648	100.00	33,365	100.00
Valid votes		58,648	95.84	33,365	96.78
Invalid/blank votes		2,544	4.16	1,110	3.22
Total votes		61,192	100.00	34,475	100.00
Registered voters/turnout		103,798	58.95	103,774	33.22

District Nº 17
Candidate	Party	Votes	%
Ant'on Obolashvili	Georgian Dream	33,149	61.85
Vazha Chit'ashvili	Strength is in Unity	12,981	24.22
Davit Gogichaishvili	Alliance of Patriots of Georgia	2,313	4.32
Zurabi Chilingarashvili	European Georgia — Movement for Liberty	2,063	3.85
Izolda Lomidze	Lelo	949	1.77
Giorgi Chit'auri	Georgian Labour Party	610	1.14
Besarion Popkhadze	Solidarity Alliance of Georgia	346	0.65
Zurab Khutsishvili	Tavisupleba	231	0.43
Olegi Sandroshvili	Georgian March	231	0.43
Gela K'varatskhelia	Tribuna – Christian Democratic Movement	193	0.36
Mariza Jikia	Georgian Choice	151	0.28
Goderdzi K'ublashvili	Free Georgia	147	0.27
Ramazi Gelashvili	Georgia	144	0.27
Mariami Ch'relashvili	Change Georgia	88	0.16
Total		53,596	100.00
Valid votes		53,596	96.42
Invalid/blank votes		1,989	3.58
Total votes		55,585	100.00
Registered voters/turnout		86,215	64.47

District Nº 18
Candidate	Party	Votes	%
Samvel Manuk'ian	Georgian Dream	19,031	61.48
Enzel Mk'oiani	Independent	6,202	20.04
Arsen K'arap'et'ian	European Georgia — Movement for Liberty	2,939	9.49
Art'ashes Hak'obian	Alliance of Patriots of Georgia	1,279	4.13
Melik Raisian	Strength is in Unity	1,251	4.04
Diana Arutunian	Georgian Choice	109	0.35
Amiran Ch'aghalidze	Free Georgia	65	0.21
Elza Grigoriani	Change Georgia	45	0.15
Mikheili Shioshvili	Georgia	33	0.11
Total		30,954	100.00
Valid votes		30,954	95.82
Invalid/blank votes		1,349	4.18
Total votes		32,303	100.00
Registered voters/turnout		57,886	55.80

District Nº 19
Candidate	Party	Votes	%
Gocha Enukidze	Georgian Dream	15,962	59.45
Dilar Khabuliani	Strength is in Unity	4,263	15.88
Soso Lip'art'eliani	Lelo	2,794	10.41
Erek'le Saghliani	Alliance of Patriots of Georgia	1,721	6.41
Gocha Gurguchiani	European Georgia — Movement for Liberty	1,592	5.93
Giorgi Zurabiani	Georgian Choice	233	0.87
P'aat'a Matsaberidze	Free Georgia	155	0.58
Maria Arsenashvili	Change Georgia	68	0.25
Iuri Belashvili	Tetrebi	60	0.22
Total		26,848	100.00
Valid votes		26,848	96.08
Invalid/blank votes		1,096	3.92
Total votes		27,944	100.00
Registered voters/turnout		44,204	63.22

District Nº 20
Candidate	Party	Votes	%
P'aat'a K'vizhinadze	Georgian Dream	43,143	69.14
Giorgi K'ap'anadze	Strength is in Unity	9,032	14.47
Giorgi K'asradze	Alliance of Patriots of Georgia	4,092	6.56
Ani Mirot'adze	Lelo	2,201	3.53
Sergo Rat'iani	European Georgia — Movement for Liberty	2,181	3.50
Rost'om Tsartsidze	Free Georgia	574	0.92
Zina Gvelesiani	Georgian Idea	416	0.67
Roin Gelashvili	Georgian Choice	261	0.42
Nino Bregvadze	Solidarity Alliance of Georgia	247	0.40
Giorgi Vach'aradze	Georgia	127	0.20
Aleksandre Gagnidze	Change Georgia	124	0.20
Total		62,398	100.00
Valid votes		62,398	96.69
Invalid/blank votes		2,133	3.31
Total votes		64,531	100.00
Registered voters/turnout		103,837	62.15

District Nº 21
Candidate	Party	First round		Second round	
Candidate	Party	Votes	%	Votes	%
Bezhan Ts'akadze	Georgian Dream	38,290	49.77	39,810	91.94
K'akha Gets'adze	Strength is in Unity	20,764	26.99	3,488	8.06
Giorgi Ts'ereteli	European Georgia — Movement for Liberty	9,561	12.43		
Ana Bibilashvili	Lelo	2,675	3.48		
Otar Shaorshadze	Alliance of Patriots of Georgia	1,706	2.22		
Samsoni Gugava	Georgian Labour Party	625	0.81		
Davit Giorgadze	Citizens	541	0.70		
Anzori Porchkhidze	Georgian March	341	0.44		
Murman Nebieridze	Free Georgia	335	0.44		
Davit Shalamberidze	Solidarity Alliance of Georgia	295	0.38		
Giorgi Kuchishvili	Georgian Idea	293	0.38		
Temur Gogsadze	Georgian Choice	264	0.34		
Giga Gabrich'idze	Political Movement of Veterans and Patriots	247	0.32		
Gela Chivadze	For United Georgia	204	0.27		
Lasha Liluashvili	Georgia	199	0.26		
Nodar Ebanoidze	Workers' Socialist Party	165	0.21		
Giorgi Gvenet'adze	New Power	160	0.21		
Nino Meparishvili	Progressive Georgia	143	0.19		
Merab Giorgobiani	Change Georgia	119	0.15		
Total		76,927	100.00	43,298	100.00
Valid votes		76,927	96.20	43,298	95.81
Invalid/blank votes		3,036	3.80	1,895	4.19
Total votes		79,963	100.00	45,193	100.00
Registered voters/turnout		131,201	60.95	131,151	34.46

District Nº 22
Candidate	Party	Votes	%
Givi Ch'ich'inadze	Georgian Dream	42,080	51.40
Nanuka Zhorzholiani	Strength is in Unity	25,806	31.52
Ak'ak'i Bobokhidze	European Georgia — Movement for Liberty	7,196	8.79
Tornik'e Artkmeladze	Lelo	1,854	2.26
Irak'li K'obrava	Alliance of Patriots of Georgia	1,574	1.92
Giorgi Ts'ulaia	Free Georgia	717	0.88
K'oba Dzidziguri	Conservative Party of Georgia	522	0.64
Indik'o Berdzenadze	Citizens	469	0.57
Zurab Meskhi	Georgian Idea	437	0.53
Aleksandre Chikovani	Solidarity Alliance of Georgia	271	0.33
Irak'li Gagnidze	Tavisupleba	238	0.29
Iosebi Chikhladze	Georgian Choice	227	0.28
Nana Tsaguria	Georgian March	189	0.23
Manana Kheladze	Change Georgia	152	0.19
Mak'a Grigolia	Georgia	132	0.16
Total		81,864	100.00
Valid votes		81,864	95.36
Invalid/blank votes		3,984	4.64
Total votes		85,848	100.00
Registered voters/turnout		144,097	59.58

District Nº 23
Candidate	Party	First round		Second round	
Candidate	Party	Votes	%	Votes	%
Zaza Lominadze	Georgian Dream	30,119	42.44	29,867	91.92
Grigol Vashadze	Strength is in Unity	24,639	34.72	2,627	8.08
Otari K'akhidze	European Georgia — Movement for Liberty	4,222	5.95		
Ana Natsvlishvili	Lelo	3,251	4.58		
Teimuraz Shashiashvili	Tetrebi	1,809	2.55		
Nona Asatiani	Alliance of Patriots of Georgia	1,453	2.05		
Ioseb K'ench'adze	Citizens	1,194	1.68		
Tornik'e Marjanishvili	Solidarity Alliance of Georgia	653	0.92		
Lasha Arsenidze	Tribuna – Christian Democratic Movement	535	0.75		
Elguja Khisht'ovani	Free Georgia	509	0.72		
Ermile Nemsadze	Georgian March	458	0.65		
Ramini Abesadze	Georgian Idea	428	0.60		
Natela Jimsheleishvili	Georgian Roots	300	0.42		
Tea Ergemlidze	Conservative Party of Georgia	285	0.40		
Dimit'ri Khmaladze	Tavisupleba	235	0.33		
Sopio Imedadze	Greens Party of Georgia	230	0.32		
Giorgi P'at'aridze	Development Party of Georgia	140	0.20		
Nik'a Kurtsik'idze	New Power	121	0.17		
Irina Saghinadze	Progressive Georgia	110	0.16		
Tamari Jinch'veladze	Change Georgia	107	0.15		
Aleksi Gejadze	Georgia	98	0.14		
Melano Shavgulidze	Georgian Choice	70	0.10		
Total		70,966	100.00	32,494	100.00
Valid votes		70,966	94.88	32,494	95.71
Invalid/blank votes		3,830	5.12	1,457	4.29
Total votes		74,796	100.00	33,951	100.00
Registered voters/turnout		155,010	48.25	154,928	21.91

District Nº 24
Candidate	Party	Votes	%
Vasil Chigogidze	Georgian Dream	35,287	55.75
Manuchar K'virk'velia	Strength is in Unity	13,867	21.91
Khatuna Gogorishvili	European Georgia — Movement for Liberty	3,700	5.85
Shota Gogiberidze	Alliance of Patriots of Georgia	2,592	4.09
Nino Shets'iruli-Gobronidze	Solidarity Alliance of Georgia	2,198	3.47
Giorgi Sioridze	Lelo	2,137	3.38
Davit Mamaladze	Georgian Labour Party	644	1.02
Otar Kerkadze	Citizens	625	0.99
Vakht'ang Zenaishvili	Girchi	616	0.97
Lasha Khetsuriani	Georgian Idea	469	0.74
Nino Oragvelidze	For Justice	424	0.67
Gocha Dzimist'arishvili	Independent	384	0.61
Ramaz Zoidze	Georgian March	228	0.36
Mak'a Mgaloblishvili	Change Georgia	126	0.20
Total		63,297	100.00
Valid votes		63,297	96.03
Invalid/blank votes		2,616	3.97
Total votes		65,913	100.00
Registered voters/turnout		107,948	61.06

District Nº 25
Candidate	Party	Votes	%
Aleksandre Mots'erelia	Georgian Dream	31,973	53.51
Roland Pipia	Strength is in Unity	20,629	34.52
Lela Keburia	European Georgia — Movement for Liberty	2,502	4.19
Tamari Belkania	Lelo	1,360	2.28
Vikt'or Tsaava	Alliance of Patriots of Georgia	1,338	2.24
Nino Gulua	Solidarity Alliance of Georgia	572	0.96
Mamuk'a Khorava	Georgian Labour Party	524	0.88
Gocha Bakhia	Free Georgia	339	0.57
Roin Nach'q'ebia	Political Movement of Veterans and Patriots	254	0.43
K'akhaberi Topuridze	Georgian March	136	0.23
Nodari Gagnidze	Change Georgia	129	0.22
Total		59,756	100.00
Valid votes		59,756	95.37
Invalid/blank votes		2,904	4.63
Total votes		62,660	100.00
Registered voters/turnout		103,578	60.50

District Nº 26
Candidate	Party	Votes	%
Irak'li Khakhubia	Georgian Dream	32,916	54.08
Murtaz Zodelava	Strength is in Unity	16,608	27.29
Giorgi Bok'eria	European Georgia — Movement for Liberty	3,796	6.24
Dato Sarsania	Independent	2,177	3.58
Teimurazi Pachulia	Alliance of Patriots of Georgia	880	1.45
Giorgi Baramia	Lelo	800	1.31
Irak'li Beraia	Solidarity Alliance of Georgia	735	1.21
Borisi Q'urua	Girchi	707	1.16
Ap'oloni Garuchava	Independent	602	0.99
Teimurazi Ts'urts'umia	Conservative Party of Georgia	430	0.71
Tamar Pachulia	Free Georgia	426	0.70
Giorgi Gakhok'idze	Georgian Idea	283	0.46
Zaali Davitaia	Progressive Georgia	176	0.29
Davit Davitaia	Georgia	132	0.22
Levan Mart'iashvili	Georgian Choice	124	0.20
Mzia Tamazashvili	Change Georgia	74	0.12
Total		60,866	100.00
Valid votes		60,866	95.53
Invalid/blank votes		2,849	4.47
Total votes		63,715	100.00
Registered voters/turnout		108,498	58.72

District Nº 27
Candidate	Party	First round		Second round	
Candidate	Party	Votes	%	Votes	%
Irak'li Chikovani	Georgian Dream	26,085	48.24	31,678	93.88
Malkhaz Jalaghonia	Strength is in Unity	19,973	36.93	2,064	6.12
Giorgi Ugulava	European Georgia — Movement for Liberty	3,905	7.22		
Aleksandre Akhvlediani	Lelo	1,144	2.12		
Otar Ch'itanava	Alliance of Patriots of Georgia	863	1.60		
Vazha K'it'ia	Tribuna – Christian Democratic Movement	494	0.91		
Giorgi Morgoshia	Conservative Party of Georgia	355	0.66		
Jambul Nach'q'ebia	Solidarity Alliance of Georgia	346	0.64		
Zurab Jinjolava	Free Georgia	212	0.39		
Ramaz Chachibaia	The Way of Zviad	210	0.39		
Davit Ardia	Georgian Idea	152	0.28		
Giorgi Gabedava	Georgian March	128	0.24		
Sopio Danelia	Georgia	78	0.14		
Nino K'ukhashvili	Change Georgia	71	0.13		
Zviad Vek'ua	New Power	61	0.11		
Total		54,077	100.00	33,742	100.00
Valid votes		54,077	95.77	33,742	96.89
Invalid/blank votes		2,391	4.23	1,082	3.11
Total votes		56,468	100.00	34,824	100.00
Registered voters/turnout		120,312	46.93	120,255	28.96

District Nº 28
Candidate	Party	First round		Second round	
Candidate	Party	Votes	%	Votes	%
Resan K'ontselidze	Georgian Dream	32,105	41.41	30,057	87.81
Levan Varshalomidze	Strength is in Unity	28,934	37.32	4,172	12.19
Armaz Akhvlediani	European Georgia — Movement for Liberty	3,102	4.00		
Irak'li K'up'radze	Lelo	2,917	3.76		
Zaur Gabaidze	Alliance of Patriots of Georgia	2,054	2.65		
Iago Khvichia	Girchi	1,963	2.53		
Ramaz Pevadze	National Democratic Movement	1,370	1.77		
Genri Dolidze	Citizens	1,038	1.34		
Mariam Jashi	Solidarity Alliance of Georgia	1,027	1.32		
T'ariel K'alandarishvili	Georgian Labour Party	522	0.67		
Ramaz Adadze	Greens Party of Georgia	464	0.60		
T'ariel Makharadze	Georgian Idea	416	0.54		
Nat'alia Dzidziguri	Conservative Party of Georgia	319	0.41		
Temur Makharadze	Georgian March	279	0.36		
Iza Surmanidze	Victorious Georgia	228	0.29		
Madona Shainidze	Georgian Choice	194	0.25		
Vakht'ang K'akhidze	Georgian Roots	176	0.23		
Lazare Zakariadze	New Power	151	0.19		
Jeiran Okrop'iridze	Repormeri	100	0.13		
Irak'li Koreli	Change Georgia	85	0.11		
Zurabi Jorbenadze	Georgia	77	0.10		
Total		77,521	100.00	34,229	100.00
Valid votes		77,521	95.27	34,229	95.24
Invalid/blank votes		3,852	4.73	1,710	4.76
Total votes		81,373	100.00	35,939	100.00
Registered voters/turnout		147,292	55.25	147,211	24.41

District Nº 29
Candidate	Party	Votes	%
Zaal Mikeladze	Georgian Dream	22,369	53.45
Bondo Tedoradze	Strength is in Unity	14,536	34.73
Amiran T'ak'idze	Alliance of Patriots of Georgia	1,201	2.87
P'aat'a Tsivadze	Lelo	752	1.80
Irine Apkhazava	European Georgia — Movement for Liberty	690	1.65
Khvicha Gamarjobadze	Democratic Movement – United Georgia	613	1.46
Davit Tsent'eradze	Georgian Idea	424	1.01
Mirian Beradze	Georgian Labour Party	300	0.72
Irma Okrop'iridze	Free Georgia	233	0.56
Zviad K'vach'ant'iradze	Solidarity Alliance of Georgia	178	0.43
Tengiz Japaridze	Georgian March	153	0.37
Jumber Ananidze	Political Movement of Veterans and Patriots	152	0.36
Natia Shakarishvili	Georgian Choice	114	0.27
Nana K'ok'ilashvili	Change Georgia	48	0.11
Laura T'ak'idze	Progressive Georgia	48	0.11
Aleksi Bakholdini	Georgia	39	0.09
Total		41,850	100.00
Valid votes		41,850	96.48
Invalid/blank votes		1,525	3.52
Total votes		43,375	100.00
Registered voters/turnout		70,837	61.23

District Nº 30
Candidate	Party	First round		Second round	
Candidate	Party	Votes	%	Votes	%
Anzor Bolkvadze	Georgian Dream	27,752	46.60	32,062	88.19
Misha Bolkvadze	Strength is in Unity	19,442	32.65	4,293	11.81
T'ariel Nak'aidze	European Georgia — Movement for Liberty	4,050	6.80		
Zorbeg Beridze	Alliance of Patriots of Georgia	2,545	4.27		
Jambul Khozrevanidze	Lelo	2,282	3.83		
Amiran Malaq'madze	Solidarity Alliance of Georgia	1,086	1.82		
Giorgi Gabaidze	Citizens	349	0.59		
Dali T'ak'idze	Free Georgia	282	0.47		
Nuk'ri Basiladze	Future Georgia	232	0.39		
Badri Shainidze	Georgian Choice	230	0.39		
Zviad K'virik'adze	Tribuna – Christian Democratic Movement	207	0.35		
Zurab Tsintskiladze	Georgian Roots	192	0.32		
Guram Gogit'idze	Georgian Idea	182	0.31		
Nabi Dolidze	Georgian March	162	0.27		
Otar Shainidze	Victorious Georgia	160	0.27		
Zurab Khimshiashvili	Tetrebi	154	0.26		
Nino Bolkvadze	Greens Party of Georgia	119	0.20		
Ketino Gejadze	Georgia	65	0.11		
Ek'at'erine Iarghanashvili	Change Georgia	64	0.11		
Total		59,555	100.00	36,355	100.00
Valid votes		59,555	95.88	36,355	95.60
Invalid/blank votes		2,560	4.12	1,674	4.40
Total votes		62,115	100.00	38,029	100.00
Registered voters/turnout		96,760	64.19	96,681	39.33

=== Maps ===
Voter turnout by constituency

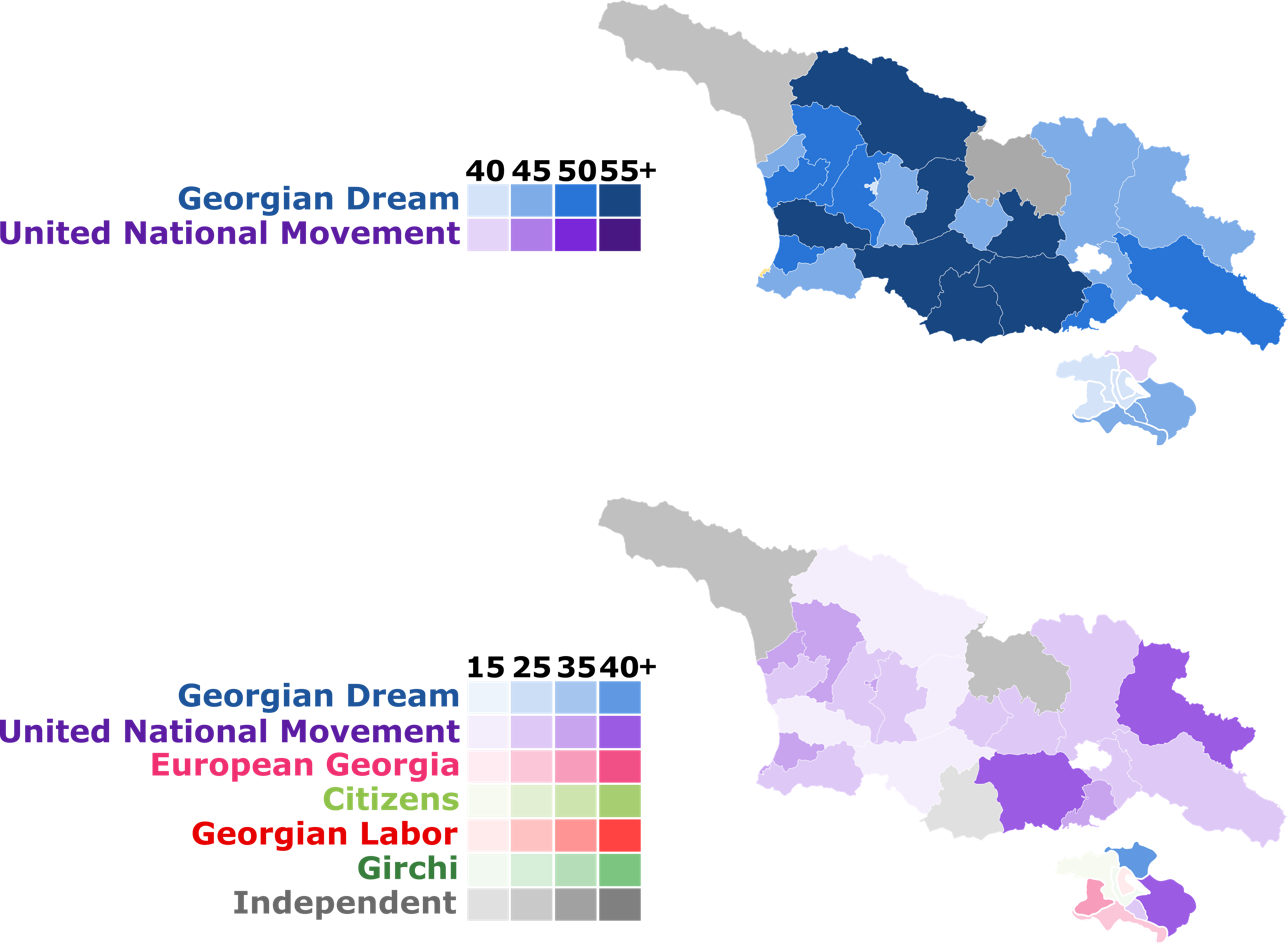
Most voted for party (top) and the second most voted party (bottom) by constituency

Districts where the second rounds were held

== Aftermath ==
=== Crisis in Georgia ===
Following the first round, protests were held in Tbilisi, with around 45,000 people attending a protest on 8 November that was eventually broken up with water cannons.

Eight opposition parties stated that they would not attend parliamentary sittings. On 3 November 2020, all Georgian opposition parties signed a joint statement renouncing their seats in the parliament until the parliamentary elections (which they considered null and void) were repeated.

=== 2022 District Nº12 by-election ===
Nino Latsabidze resigned as she was elected mayor of Rustavi. Election held on 2 April 2022.

Candidate	Party	Votes	%
Irak'li Shat'ak'ishvili	Georgian Dream	34,333	90.61
Mamuk'a T'usk'adze	For Social Justice	2,634	6.95
K'amal Muradkhanovi	Unity and Development Party	923	2.44
Total		37,890	100.00
Valid votes		37,890	93.29
Invalid/blank votes		2,724	6.71
Total votes		40,614	100.00
Registered voters/turnout		139,989	29.01
Source: CESKO

=== 2023 District Nº26 by-election ===
Irakli Khakhubia died on 27 October 2022. Election held on 29 April 2023.

Candidate	Party	Votes	%
Giorgi Khakhubia	Georgian Dream	27,551	95.30
Besik'i Ts'uleisk'iri	Free Georgia	1,359	4.70
Total		28,910	100.00
Valid votes		28,910	97.70
Invalid/blank votes		681	2.30
Total votes		29,591	100.00
Registered voters/turnout		105,314	28.10
Source: CESKO

=== 2023 District Nº15 by-election ===
Giorgi Khojevanishvili resigned on 7 February 2023. Election held on 1 October 2023.

Candidate	Party	Votes	%
Giorgi Sosiashvili	Georgian Dream	23,523	93.77
Mamuk'a T'usk'adze	For Social Justice	1,562	6.23
Total		25,085	100.00
Valid votes		25,085	97.16
Invalid/blank votes		733	2.84
Total votes		25,818	100.00
Registered voters/turnout		134,066	19.26
Source: CESKO
