= Financial Transparency Coalition =

- Predecessor: Task Force on Financial Integrity and Economic Development
- Formation: 2013
- Type: Task Force made up of Coalition of NGOs and Governments
- Purpose: Stem illicit financial flows
- Location: Washington, D.C., United States
- Website: www.financialtransparency.org

The Financial Transparency Coalition is a group that brings together civil society and governments around the world to stem illicit financial flows that are costing developing countries nearly a trillion dollars each year. The Coalition was formerly known as the Task Force on Financial Integrity and Economic Development.

== Membership ==
According to its website, the members of the coordinating committee responsible for its operations are Centre for Budget and Governance Accountability, Christian Aid, Eurodad, Fundación SES, Global Financial Integrity, Global Witness, LATINDADD, Tax Justice Network, Tax Justice Network Africa, and Transparency International. Coalition administration is managed by a neutral secretariat based at the Center for International Policy in Washington, DC.

The Coalition includes a non-voting Partnership Panel of Governments and Foundations. Its members are:

- Canadian International Development Agency
- Ford Foundation
- Government of Belgium
- Government of Chile
- Government of Denmark
- Government of Finland
- Government of France
- Government of Germany
- Government of Greece
- Government of India
- Government of the Netherlands
- Government of Norway
- Government of Peru
- Government of South Africa
- Government of Spain
- Leading Group on Innovative Financing for Development

== Policy ==
The Coalition advocates around six policy areas for greater financial transparency – public country-by-country reporting of sales, profits, and taxes paid by multinational corporations; public registers of beneficial ownership of business entities; automatic cross-border exchange of tax information; open data; ensuring that the institutions making international standards are equitable; holding the enablers of illicit financial flows accountable.

== See also ==
- Financial Action Task Force on Money Laundering
- Illicit financial flows
- Raymond W. Baker
