= Eurodad =

European Network on Debt and Development

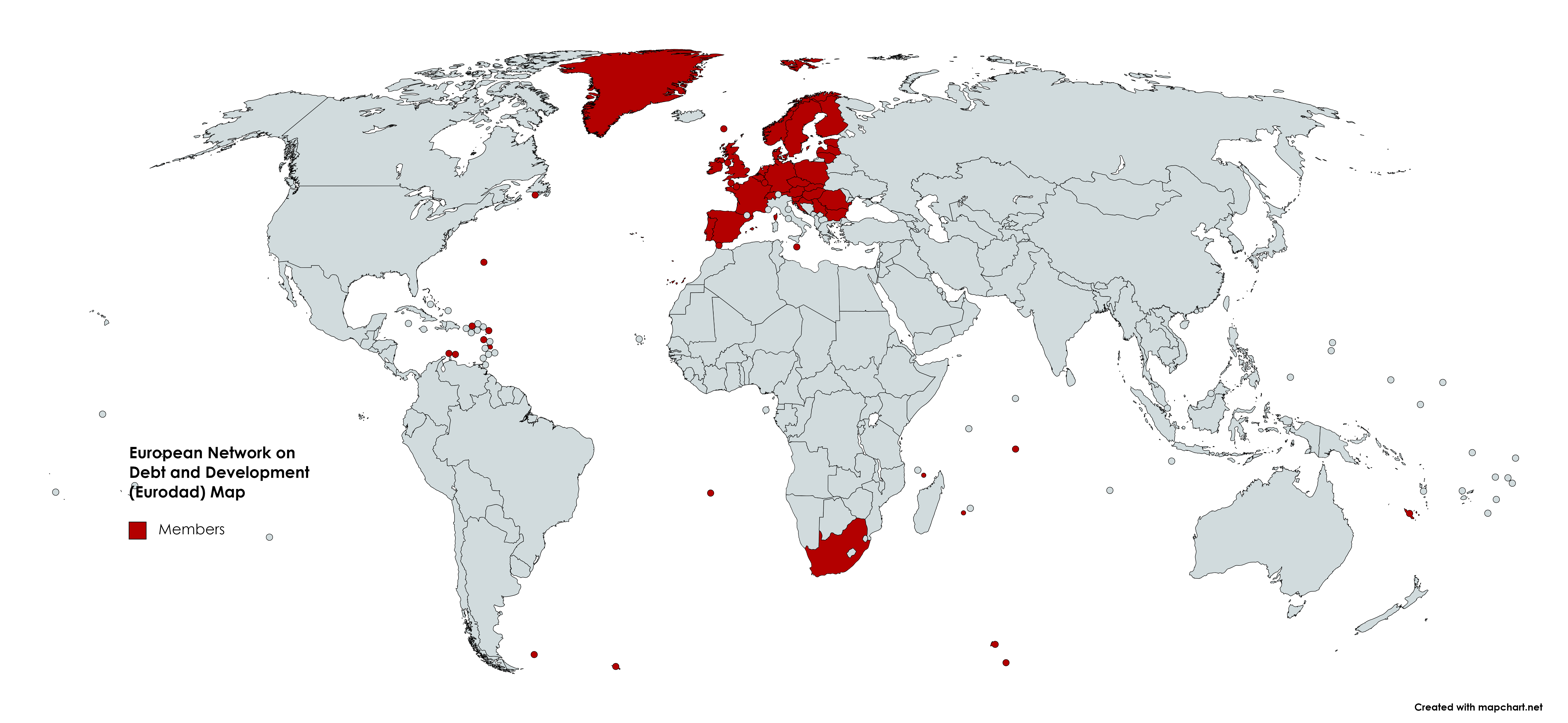
- European Network on Debt and Development Eurodad Map
- Abbreviation: Eurodad
- Formation: 1990; 36 years ago
- Type: Coalition of NGOs
- Headquarters: Rue d’Edimbourg, 18 – 26,
- Location: Brussels, Belgium
- Director: Jean Saldanha
- Website: www.eurodad.org

Eurodad (European Network on Debt and Development) is a network of 53 non-governmental organisations (NGOs) and seven statutory allies from 29 European countries. Eurodad and its members make up a network, this network researches and works on issues that are related to debt, development finance and poverty reduction.

The network has focussed on issues such as tracking the aid spent by European countries, multilateral debt cancellation, debt sustainability, aid quality, conditionality and harmonisation, illegitimate debt, and export credit debts.

Eurodad's main targets are organisations such as the World Bank, the International Monetary Fund (IMF), the Organisation for Economic Co-operation and Development, however it also targets European governments themselves.

Eurodad’s stated aims are to:

- push for development policies that support pro-poor and democratically defined sustainable development strategies.
- support the empowerment of Southern people to chart their own path towards development and ending poverty.
- seek a lasting and sustainable solution to the debt crisis, appropriate development financing, and a stable international financial system conducive to development.

== History ==
Eurodad coordinates the work of non-governmental organisations working on these issues, and collaborates actively with civil society in the North and South to attain these goals. Eurodad has existed since 1990 and is registered as a non-profit organisation in both the Netherlands and Belgium. It is funded by its members (about one-third of its budget) and by the Dutch Ministry of Foreign Affairs, Swedish International Development Cooperation Agency and UK Department for International Development.

The members in the UK include CAFOD, Oxfam, Christian Aid, Tearfund and the World Development Movement.

== Illicit capital flight ==
Eurodad has focused a lot of attention on the issue of illicit capital flight (or illicit financial flows) in their campaign to promote economic development in the developing world. As such, they've become a coordinating committee member of the Task Force on Financial Integrity & Economic Development, a coalition of NGOs and governments working to promote transparency in the international financial system.

The problem of Illicit capital flight is aggravated by the fact that it is not exactly illegal and it assumes the informal unofficial economic activities of organizations. It aims to "get around rules and processes typically not using money but favors, privileges and perks as a means of exchange."

In 2009, Eurodad published a limited-edition book called Global Development Finance: Illicit Flows Report 2009. The hundreds of pages, which were expected to contain comprehensive estimates of the illicit global financial flows, were all blank. According to the organization, this was to highlight a willful blindness on the part of world's most powerful institution to this transfer of wealth. This is underscored by the fact that more than 50 percent of these illicit flows originate from poor to rich countries, affecting the incidence of poverty in these locations. The G20 has pledged to address "illicit outflows" but there are critics who note that the commitment cited the need to address the problem in the victim countries while it was silent on the corresponding "inflow" or the locations that receive the flow of money.

== See also ==
- Directorate-General for Development (European Commission)
- European Development Fund
- European Parliament Committee on Development
- Millennium Development Goals
- Task Force on Financial Integrity & Economic Development
- United Nations Development Programme
