= Rashwe.com =

Rashwe.com is a Lebanese citizen initiative. It is a web portal created by Rabih G. Sfeir for the purpose of collecting data on bribery in Lebanon.

The initiative was officially launched on December 18, 2012. Pre-launch works on the website (logo design, web pages design and web development) were started around a year earlier. First data posted on the website reflects claims of briberies for the period from December 18, 2012, to February 28, 2013. The data was not meaningful enough to derive any inferences. The founder is still working and pushing hard to get media and publicity exposure and reach out to a large Lebanese audience in order to get a meaningful data and a steady stream of claims. The website has received a fair amount of media coverage notable newspapers (around five local newspapers).

== Corruption in Lebanon ==
Lebanon is among the most corrupt countries in the world. Transparency International issues a yearly Index measuring corruption perception in 176 countries and according to the 2012 index, Lebanon ranks 128th among 170 countries. Within the MENA region, Lebanon ranks only better to the countries where there is political and security turmoil (Syria, Libya...). It is believed that around these ranks, corruption costs around 10% of GDP. In addition to that, Global Financial Integrity issues a report on illicit financial flows from Developing Countries and Lebanon had $21 billion illicit outflow during a 10-year period ending in 2010.

So between $3 and $4 billion is the approximated yearly cost of corruption in Lebanon which means around $1,000 per Lebanese citizen as a cost paid yearly.

== Ultimate Target ==
The initiative of rashwe.com aims to eradicate the cost of corruption and briberies and make sure that citizens pay less and less on this corrupt practice. The founder strongly believes that once you have statistical numbers and studies, it is much easier to show the problem and thus induce more people to tackle such issues.

Once a meaningful data is available, politicians should adopt strong and firm initiatives to bring down the numbers and thus reflect on the well-being of the citizens. By bringing down corruption, costs of affecting business drops, and this will reflect on prices and services in Lebanon.

This initiative was financed so far (19 June 2013) solely by the founder. This is also a non governmental initiative and the founder is keen to maintain confidentiality of the claimants in addition to that they can keep their names anonymous. He also believes that the identity of the claimants is irrelevant once the data reflects large number of claims.

Given a new competition from a well funded source, www.sakkera.com, rashwe.com is currently not updated and on halt.
