= Mariam Jashi =

Georgian politician (born 1976)

Mariam Jashi მარიამ ჯაში
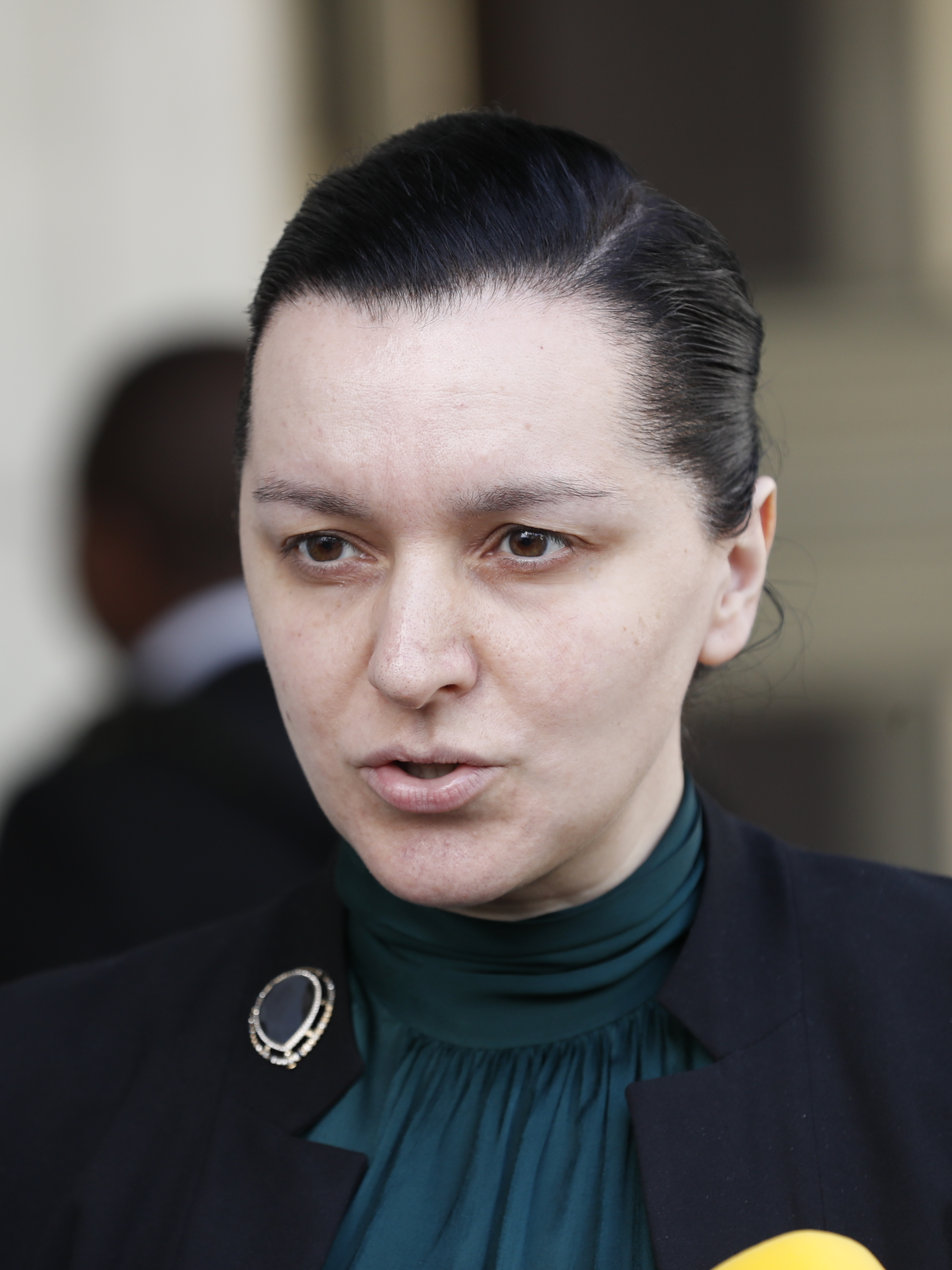

Regional Chair for Eastern Europe and Central Asia of the Global Parliamentarians Network UNITE
- Incumbent
- Assumed office 2019

President of the Leading Group Secretariat on Innovative Financing for Development
- In office 2017–2018

Member of the Georgian Parliament
- In office 18 November 2016 – 11 December 2020

Chairperson of Education, Science and Culture Committee of Parliament of Georgia
- In office 18 November 2016 – 18 November 2019

Chairperson of Parliamentary Fraction "Independent Members of Parliament"
- In office 2 December 2019 – 11 December 2020
- Preceded by: Position established

Secretary General of the Solidarity Alliance of Georgia
- Incumbent
- Assumed office 7 June 2020
- Preceded by: Position established

Deputy Minister of Labour, Health and Social Affairs of Georgia
- In office 2012–2014

Personal details
- Born: 17 June 1976 (age 50) Tbilisi, Georgia
- Party: Georgian Dream (2016–2019); Independent (2019–2020); Solidarity Alliance of Georgia (2020–present)
- Education: Harvard University (M.P.A); Tbilisi State University (M.P.H.); Davit Tvildiani Medical University (M.D.)

Mariam Jashi (Georgian: მარიამ ჯაში; born 17 June 1976) is a Georgian politician and senior policymaker in Global Health, Sustainable Development and Innovative Financing. She is the board member of the Global Parliamentarians Network UNITE, Former Member of Parliament of Georgia, Chairperson of the first Parliamentary Fraction of Independent MPs, President of the Leading Group on Innovative Financing for Development, Chairperson of Education, Science and Culture Committee of the Parliament, Deputy Minister of Labour, Health and Social Affairs and UNICEF Officer in complex humanitarian and emergency settings. After completing her medical and public health degrees at AIETI (Note: David Tvildiani Medical University is also knowns as "AIETI") and Tbilisi State University, she graduated from Harvard Kennedy School of Government as Edwards S. Mason Fellow.

== Work experience ==
Currently, Mariam Jashi serves as the Regional Chair for Eastern Europe and Central Asia of the Global Parliamentarians Network UNITE leading advocacy and inter-parliamentarian dialogue on global health agenda vis-à-vis 2030 Sustainable Development Goals (SDGs).

In 2017–2018 Jashi was elected as the president of the Leading Group Secretariat on Innovative Financing for Development, hosted by the Ministry of Europe and Foreign Affairs of France (2017–2018). In this capacity she chaired high-level meetings on Innovative Financing on the margins of 72nd and 73rd Sessions of the UN General Assembly and co-authored TISIFF Recommendations – a global roadmap for narrowing SDG funding gap through innovative funding platforms.

In 2016–2019 Jashi was the elected Majoritarian Member of Parliament, Chairperson of the Education, Science and Culture Committee, Member of the Parliamentary Committee for Health and Social Affairs and Member of the Gender Equality Council of the Parliament. As the Committee Chair Dr. Jashi led and successfully negotiated legislative amendments for inclusive education of children and youth, distance education for prisoners and Vocational Education and Training.

In November 2019 Georgia's ruling party failed to fulfill its declared commitment towards Constitutional and election reforms that would ensure broader political pluralism and stronger democratic institutions in the country. On this background Mariam Jashi left the Georgian Dream Party and became the Chair of the first Parliamentary Fraction of Independent members of parliament.

In June 2020 with fellow Parliamentarians, Jashi co-founded a new opposition party – the Solidarity Alliance of Georgia and is the secretary-general of the political union. As the leader of Independent MPs Fraction of the Parliament, Mariam Jashi and her colleagues secured critical votes for the Constitutional and Election reforms in 2020 for greater political pluralism and strengthening of democratic institutions in Georgia.

In 2014 Jashi co-founded and became the first CEO of the Prime Minister’s Initiative – the Solidarity Fund of Georgia for innovative financing. As the CEO of the Solidarity Fund Mariam Jashi led mobilization of 10 million GEL from 60,000 civil servants and 65 business companies, built partnerships with health care providers in 15 countries and provided high quality diagnostics and treatment to 390 children and young people with Cancer.

In 2012–2014 Jashi served as a deputy minister of Labour, Health and Social Affairs playing a key role in launching the Flagship Programme of Universal Health Care for 2 million citizens with no previous medical insurance coverage. In 2013–2014 she also initiated the first rounds of US-Georgia negotiations that eventually led to strategic partnership with Gilead Science Inc. and universal access to high-cost DAA regiments for Hepatitis C patients. Thanks to the support of the US Government and Gilead Science Inc. Georgia is considered among the first countries globally to virtually eliminate Hepatitis C.

Her earlier experience includes 11 years of humanitarian and development work with the United Nations, in charge of UNICEF Health and Nutrition Sector and UNAIDS programme in Georgia (1999–2006), leading Immunization Portfolio for women and children at UNICEF Occupied Palestinian Territory (2003), and coordination of inter-agency Partnerships for HIV/AIDS at UNICEF New York City headquarters (2007–2010). She has also served as a member of Independent Review Committee of the GAVI Alliance (Switzerland) and international consultant for public health and development programmes for UN agencies (UNDP, UN Women, UNFPA, UNICEF), the Global Fund, the World Bank, PricewaterCoopers and Curatio International Foundation.

=== Major achievements ===
- As the leader of the first Parliamentary Fraction of Independent MPs, secured critical votes for the Constitutional and Election reforms in 2020 for greater political pluralism in Georgia.
- With UNICEF Dr. Jashi authored grant applications that mobilized US$72 million grants from USAID, UNITAID and Japan Government for humanitarian and development programmes in 18 countries.
- Lead author of strategic plants and grant applications to the Global Fund, The GAVI Alliance and GAIN that mobilized 27 million USD for HIV/AIDS, Immunization, Malaria and Food Fortification programmes for Georgia. The support has ensured universal access to antiretroviral treatment for people living with HIV and Malaria eradication in the country.
- Lead author of TISIFF Recommendations – a global roadmap how to galvanize Innovative financing for Development and narrow the critical funding gap for 17 Goals of the 2030 Sustainable Development agenda.
- Co-author of Universal Health Care programme in Georgia with > 90% coverage of country population and the Model Hepatitis C Elimination programme with universal access to high-cost DAA regimens.
- Recipient of the World Health Organization Award for contribution to Polio Elimination in Europe.
- Recipient of Award and Gold Medal from the National Alliance for Nutrition for contribution to the Food Fortification initiatives in Georgia.
- Led and successfully negotiated legislative amendments for inclusive education of children and youth, distance education for prisoners, and Vocational Education and Training.
- Chair and Key Note Speaker at UN High Level Meetings, UN General Assembly Session side-events, Parliament of Portugal, Ministry of Foreign Affairs of France, etc.

== Education ==
Jashi graduated from Harvard University as the Master of Public Administration (MPA) and Edward S. Mason Fellow of Harvard Kennedy School in 2011. She holds Doctor of Medicine (MD) degree from Davit Tvildiani Medical University (AIETI Medical School), Master of Public Health (MPH) from Tbilisi State University and post-graduate qualifications in health and development from Lund University, University College London, Semmelweis University and the World Bank Institute (US).

== Research and publications ==
1. Acknowledged contribution to the IAP Report. "Caught in the COVID-19 storm: Women’s, children’s, and adolescents’ health in the context of UHC and the SDGs”. UN Secretary General’s Independent Accountability Panel (IAP) for Every Women, Every Child and Every Adolescent, 2020.
2. M. Jashi, R. Viswanathan, R. Ekpini, U. Chandan, P. Idele, C. Luo, K. Legins, A. Chatterjee. Informing policy and programme decisions for scaling up the PMTCT and paediatric HIV response through joint technical missions. Health Policy And Planning 2012;1–8. Oxford University Press in association with The London School of Hygiene and Tropical Medicine.
3. M. Jashi. Current trends and recommendations for social protection policies in Georgia with focus on IDP, conflict affected and ethnic minority women. UN Women, 2015.
4. PhDouste-Blazy, Y. Glemarec, M.Jashi. TISIFF Recommendations for Galvanizing Innovative Financing for 2030 SDGs – Leading Group on Innovative Financing for Development.
5. M. Jashi. T. Tchelidze. Georgia's Success towards Universal Health Coverage. Technology and Global Public Health. Springer Nature Switzerland AG 2020.
6. M. Jashi. The Right to be Born Free of HIV. Harvard Kennedy School Review. 2011
7. M. Jashi. Women's Political Participation as Predictor of Democracy. Independent Research, Harvard Kennedy School, 2010.
