= Capital flight =

Economic event

Capital flight, in economics, is the rapid flow of assets or money out of a country, due to an event of economic consequence or as the result of a political event such as regime change. Such events could be erratic or untrustworthy behavior by leadership, an increase in taxes on capital or capital holders or the government of the country defaulting on its debt that disturbs investors and causes them to lower their valuation of the assets in that country, or otherwise to lose confidence in its economic strength.

Demand and supply equilibrium in Economics

This leads to a disappearance of wealth, and is usually accompanied by a sharp drop in the exchange rate of the affected country—depreciation in a variable exchange rate regime, or a forced devaluation in a fixed exchange rate regime. This fall is particularly damaging when the capital belongs to the people of the affected country because not only are the citizens now burdened by the loss in the economy and devaluation of their currency but their assets have lost much of their nominal value. This leads to dramatic decreases in the purchasing power of the country's assets and makes it increasingly expensive to import goods and acquire any form of foreign facilities, e.g. medical facilities.

== Causes ==
Countries with resource-based economies experience the largest capital flight. A classical view on capital flight is that it is currency speculation that drives significant cross-border movements of private funds, enough to affect financial markets. The presence of capital flight indicates the need for policy reform.

Léonce Ndikumana and James K. Boyce argue that more than 65% of Africa's borrowed debts do not even get into countries in Africa, but remain in private bank accounts in tax havens all over the world. Ndikumana and Boyce estimate that from 1970 to 2008, capital flight from 33 sub-Saharan countries totalled $700 billion. A 2008 paper published by Global Financial Integrity estimated capital flight, also called illicit financial flows to be "out of developing countries are some $850 billion to $1 trillion a year."

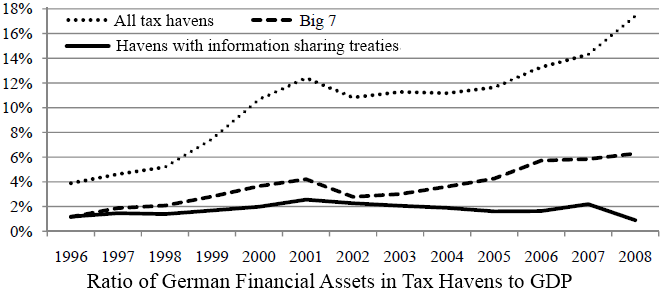
Ratio of German assets in tax havens to German GDP. The "Big 7" shown are Hong Kong, Ireland, Lebanon, Liberia, Panama, Singapore, and Switzerland.

Capital flight also takes place in order to evade taxes. In such cases, the flow tends to go in the direction of tax havens.

=== Legality ===
Capital flight may be legal or illegal under domestic law. Legal capital flight is recorded on the books of the entity or individual making the transfer, and earnings from interest, dividends, and realized capital gains normally return to the country of origin. Illegal capital flight, also known as illicit financial flows, is intended to disappear from any record in the country of origin and earnings on the stock of illegal capital flight outside of a country generally do not return to the country of origin. It is indicated as missing money from a nation's balance of payments.

== Examples ==
In 1995, the International Monetary Fund (IMF) estimated that capital flight amounted to roughly half of the outstanding foreign debt of the most heavily indebted countries of the world.

Capital flight was seen in some Asian and Latin American markets in the 1990s. Perhaps the most consequential of these was the 1997 Asian financial crisis that started in Thailand and spread through much of East Asia beginning in July 1997, raising fears of a worldwide economic meltdown due to financial contagion.

In the last quarter of the 20th century, capital flight was observed from countries that offer low or negative real interest rate (like Russia and Argentina) to countries that offer higher real interest rate (like the People's Republic of China).

A 2006 article in The Washington Post gave several examples of private capital leaving France in response to the country's wealth tax. The article also stated, "Eric Pinchet, author of a French tax guide, estimates the wealth tax earns the government about $2.6 billion a year but has cost the country more than $125 billion in capital flight since 1998."

A 2009 article in The Times reported that hundreds of wealthy financiers and entrepreneurs had recently fled England, Wales and Scotland in response to recent tax increases, and had relocated in low tax destinations such as Jersey, Guernsey, the Isle of Man, and the British Virgin Islands.

In May 2012 the scale of Greek capital flight in the wake of the first "undecided" legislative election was estimated at €4 billion a week and later that month the Spanish Central Bank revealed €97 billion in capital flight from the Spanish economy for the first quarter of 2012.

In the run up to the British referendum on leaving the EU (Brexit) there was a net capital outflow of £77 billion in the preceding two quarters, £65 billion in the quarter immediately before the referendum and £59 billion in March when the referendum campaign started. This corresponds to a figure of £2 billion in the equivalent six months in the preceding year.

A report from the Central Bank of Iran noted that the first quarter of 2025 saw the highest capital outflow the country had ever recorded. Despite a $6 billion trade surplus, $9 billion left Iran via capital flight. The Turkish Statistical Institute observed that year that Iranians had become a significant demographic of purchasers of Turkish real estate, which was attributable to capital flight driven by economic and political uncertainty in Iran. One political scientist noted that the pattern of capital flight accompanied an analogous phenomenon of brain drain.

In April 2025, the United States president Donald Trump announced wide ranging tariffs that triggered a "Sell America" trade internationally. It was re-energized twice in 2026, first in January after Trump expressed a desire to take over Greenland in opposition to the European Union stance and again in July following the Federal Reserve's decision to leave interest rates unchanged during its FOMC meeting.

== See also ==
- Bank run
- Capital strike
- Criticisms of globalization
- Gentrification
- Human capital flight (brain drain)
- Sudden stop (economics)
- Tax exporting
