= Zviad Kvachantiradze =

Georgian parliamentarian and diplomat

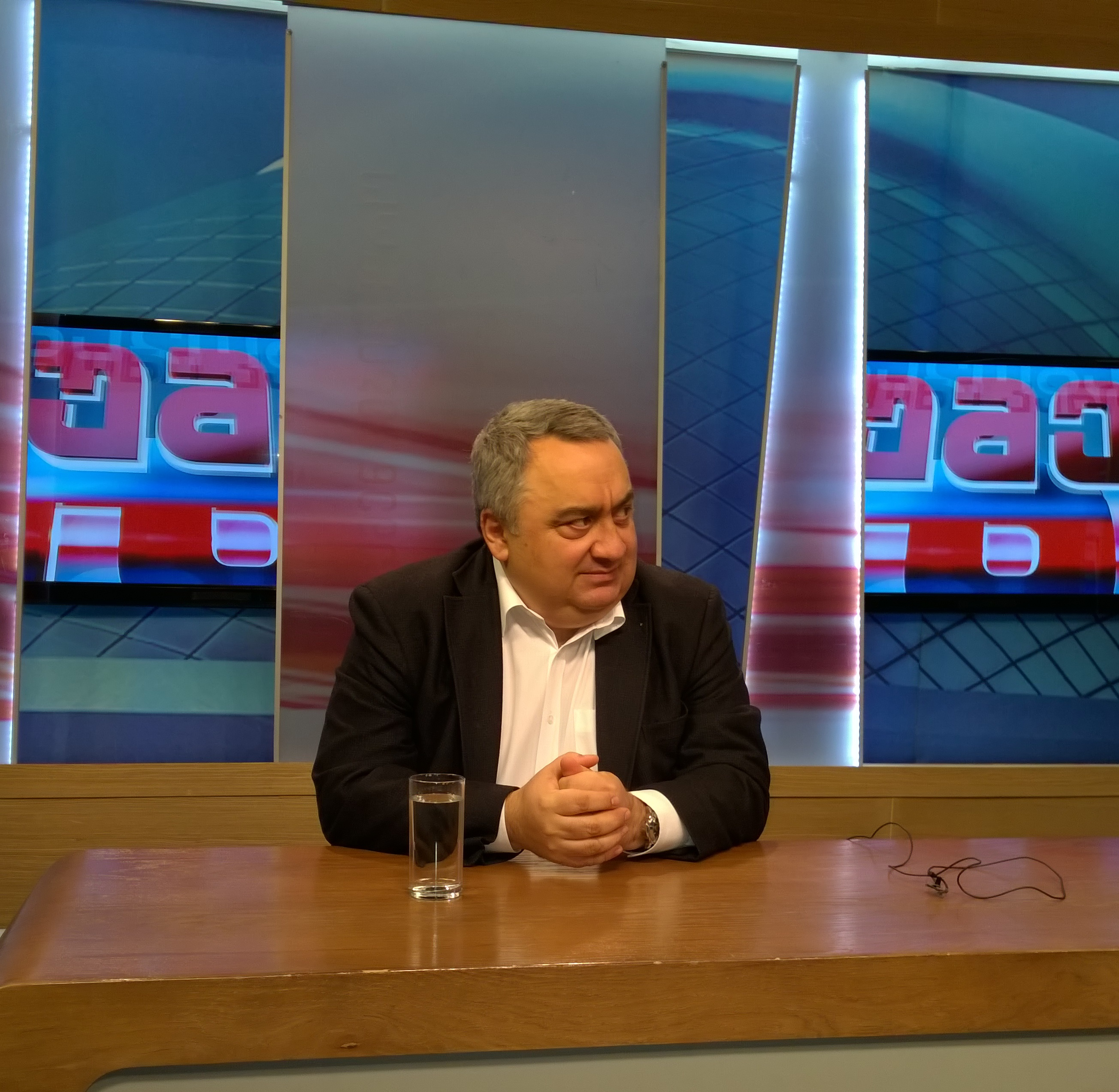
- Zviad Kvachantiradze on Arguments Time

Personal details
- Born: 7 July 1965 (age 61)
- Citizenship: (Georgia (country)) Georgia
- Party: Georgian Dream (2012–2019); For Justice (2019–2020); Solidarity Alliance of Georgia (since 2020)

Zviad Kvatchantiradze (Georgian: ზვიად კვაჭანტირაძე; born 7 July 1965, Ozurgeti) is a Georgian parliamentarian and diplomat. He has served as Chairman of the EU-Georgia Parliamentary Committee on Association, first Vice Chairman of the Committee on Foreign Relations of the Parliament of Georgia, leader of the Majority Party, and member of the Parliamentary Assembly of the Council of Europe (PACE). He was formerly Consul General of Georgia in Istanbul, Turkey, from 2005-2009 and Secretary-General of the TRACECA Intergovernmental Commission from 2000 to 2004. He holds a rank of Ambassador Extraordinary and Plenipotentiary since 2001.

== Education ==
Kvatchantiradze obtained a degree in history from the Faculty of History and Law of the State University in Yaroslavl, Russia in 1990. He received a diploma in Social Market Economy and Public Relations from Carl Duisberg College in Cologne, Germany in 1995.

== Career ==
=== Early career ===
From 1991 to 1993, Kvatchantiradze was the manager of the academic interchange program at the Georgian branch of the ICSC-World Laboratory, an international non-governmental organisation in Tbilisi.

In 1993 Kvatchantiradze was among the pioneers of public relations in Georgia and co-founded the Tbilisi Public Relations Centre (TPRC), the first PR company in Georgia. The same year, under the leadership of conductor Jansug Kakhidze, he helped to found the Georgian Society of Patrons of Music. As co-president of the society he contributed to founding the Tbilisi Symphony Orchestra.

In January 1994 Kvatchantiradze won Germany's Carl Duisberg scholarship and moved to Cologne to study. After graduating from Carl Duisberg College, he worked in a professional practice in Germany, where his responsibilities included activity in the German Foreign Office in Bonn.

In March 1996, Kvatchantiradze returned to Georgia and joined the civil service as a State Advisor in the State Chancellery of the President of Georgia. He also served as director of the Department of European Integration and International Relations of the Ministry of Transport and Communications. From 1997 to 2000 he was a member of the Committee of Deputies in the European Conference of the Ministers of Transport (renamed in 2007 to the International Transport Forum), as well as a member of the Inland Transport Committee of the UN ECE.

=== Diplomat ===
In 2000 Kvatchantiradze was elected a first Secretary-General of the Permanent Secretariat of the newly established intergovernmental organisation, Transport Corridor Europe-Caucasus-Asia (TRACECA), based in Baku, Azerbaijan. He personally contributed to its establishment. In 2002-2004 he also was a President of the Caspian International Club of Transport and Communications. In 2004 he returned to Tbilisi, Georgia and reentered the Georgian foreign service as Head of the Directorate for the Council of Europe in the Ministry of Foreign Affairs of Georgia. In 2005 Kvatchantiradze was appointed Consul General of Georgia to Turkey.

=== In politics and Parliament ===
Before joining politics, Kvatchantiradze had been the Chairman-in-office of the board of the Georgian Quality Foundation since February 2010. In April 2012, he was a founding member of the major oppositional political party Georgian Dream alongside Bidzina Ivanishvili.

In the 1 October 2012 elections, Kvatchantiradze won the district 60 Ozurgeti seat.

On 3 October, Kvatchantiradze was elected a First Vice Chairman of the Parliamentary Committee on Foreign Relations and a member of the European Integration Committee. In June 2015 he was confirmed as Co-Chairman of the EU-Georgia Parliamentary Committee on Association. In October 2015, he was elected leader of the Majority Party, filling the vacancy left by Davit Saganelidze.

In 2016 he was elected an MP of the 9th Parliament. From 2016-2019 he was Chairman of the Parliamentary Committee on Diaspora and Caucasus Issues.

On 27 February 2019, Kvachantiradze left Georgian Dream. A meeting of members of the Georgian Dream party was held on 18 March where it was decided that a vote would be held in Parliament to replace Kvachantiradze as Chairman of the Parliamentary Committee on Diaspora and Caucasus Issues with Beka Odisharia, but the vote failed in Parliament on 19 March. Before a second vote could be called by Irakli Kobakhidze, Kvachantiradze resigned the Chairmanship. Anri Okhanashvili claimed that there was an issue with the voting buttons that caused the initial vote to fail. The vote subsequently carried, making Odisharia the Committee Chairman.

After leaving the majority, Kvachantiradze and Eka Beselia were removed from the delegation sent to the Parliamentary Assembly of the Council of Europe, a move that Liliane Maury Pasquier stated she understood would not take place until January 2020, despite the Georgian Parliament forming a new delegation prior to 18 April 2019.

Kvachantiradze joined with Beselia and Gedevan Popkhadze to form the For Justice party on 20 June 2019. Kvachantiradze was the initial political secretary of the party as well as being a member of its council.

On 7 June 2020, Kvachantiradze and five other members of Parliament – including Popkhadze – founded a new party, the Solidarity Alliance of Georgia. Kvachantiradze served as the party's political council chairman. Despite founding the new party, both Kvachantiradze and Popkhadze retained their positions with For Justice because they had not signed statements of withdrawal.

In 2023, Kvachantiradze signed a statement alongside thirteen other former members of the Georgian Dream party calling on Parliament to begin the reforms required for candidacy to become a member of the European Union.

=== On social issues ===
Kvatchantiradze expressed disagreement with statements attributed to Ilia II made in January 2014 which opposed surrogacy.

He was committed to integrating Georgia into Europe and NATO.

With respect to Russian relations, when Yury Luzhkov visited Abkhazia in 2017, a violation of the Law on Occupied Territories of Georgia, Georgian authorities included his name on a list of "undesirable persons" in response to his statement that he did not care he had broken the law. Kvachantiradze called it a provocation.

== Personal life ==
Kvatchantiradze is married with two sons. He speaks Georgian, English, German, Russian and Turkish languages.

== Sources ==
- ბესელიას თქმით, კვაჭანტირაძე და ფოფხაძე იურიდიულად ჯერ მისი პარტიიდან არ გასულან [Beselia says Kvachantiradze and Popkhadze have not left her party yet]. Netgazeti (in Georgian). 8 June 2020.
- ეკა ბესელიამ პარტია "სამართლიანობისთვის" ყრილობა გამართა [Eka Beselia holds inaugural "For Justice" party convention]. on.ge (in Georgian). 20 June 2019.
- "Former Georgian Dream MPs Set up New Party". Civil Georgia. 8 June 2020.
- "Former members of Georgian Dream on agents draft laws: Even the consideration of them will cause irreparable damage to the European integration process - we call on the Parliament to stop the consideration immediately". InterpressNews. 7 March 2023.
- "Independent MPs establish a new party - "Our Georgia - Solidarity Alliance"". First Channel. 7 June 2020. Archived from the original on 30 October 2020.
- დამოუკიდებელი დეპუტატები ახალი პარტიის “ჩვენი საქართველო სოლიდარობის ალიანსი“ პრეზენტაციას მართავენ [Independent MPs Present New Party, "Solidarity Alliance of Georgia"]. InterpressNews (in Georgian). 7 June 2020.
- კვაჭანტირაძე: ჩვენი კრიტიკა უპირველესად ჩვენი კრიტიკოსებისთვისაა წამგებიანი [Kvachantiradze: The Criticism Against Us is Detrimental to Our Critics]. Tabula (in Georgian). 2 April 2016.
- პარლამენტს კვაჭანტირაძის გადაყენება მეორედ უნდა ეცადა, მან თავმჯდომარის პოსტი თავად დატოვა [Kvachantiradze resigns as Chairman before second Parliamentary vote held]. Tabula (in Georgian). 19 March 2019.
- ოხანაშვილი: მეც ამრევია ღილაკები, ეს არის ტექნიკური საკითხი [Okhanashvili: The buttons were mixed up, this was a technical problem]. Tabula (in Georgian). 19 March 2019.
- "One More Lawmaker Quits Georgian Dream Party". Civil Georgia. 28 February 2019.
- პარლამენტმა ზვიად კვაჭანტირაძე კომიტეტის თავმჯდომარეობიდან ვერ გადააყენა [Parliament Fails to Remove Zviad Kvachantiradze from Committee Chairmanship]. Tabula (in Georgian). 19 March 2019.
- "Russia warns citizens and accuses Tbilisi of provocations". JAM News. 16 May 2017.
- ზვიად კვაჭანტირაძე [Zviad Kvachantiradze]. Biographical Dictionary of Georgia (in Georgian).
- "Zviad Kvachantiradze". myparliament.transparency.ge. 7 September 2019 [31 January 2019].
- "Zviad Kvachantiradze". Parliament of Georgia.
- ზვიად კვაჭანტირაძე – ბრიუსელში სამიტზე აუცილებლად უნდა წავიდეთ, ეს კი არა, როცა არ გვეძახიან, ამ კარზე მაშინაც უნდა ვაკაკუნოთ [Zviad Kvachantiradze – We must attend the summit in Brussels; in fact, we should knock on that door even when we aren't invited.]. First Channel (in Georgian). 15 March 2018.
- ზვიად კვაჭანტირაძემ საპარლამენტო უმრავლესობა დატოვა [Zviad Kvachantiradze has left the parliamentary majority]. Imedi News (in Georgian). 27 February 2019. Archived from the original on 1 July 2020.
- ზვიად კვაჭანტირაძე: არ მჯერა, რომ ეს ყველაფერი პატრიარქის სურვილით გაჟღერდა [Zviad Kvachantiradze: I do not believe that this was said at the Patriarch's behest]. Tabula (in Georgian). 7 January 2014.
- საპარლამენტო უმრავლესობის ლიდერად ზვიად კვაჭანტირაძე წარადგინეს [Zviad Kvachantiradze Nominated a leader of the Parliamentary Majority]. Tabula (in Georgian). 19 October 2015.
- საპარლამენტო უმრავლესობის ლიდერის პოსტზე ზვიად კვაჭანტირაძეა წარდგენილი [Zviad Kvachantiradze Nominated for Parliamentary Majority Leader]. Netgazeti (in Georgian). 19 October 2015.
- Fuller, Liz (25 December 2015). "Georgia's Ruling Party Selects New Prime Minister". Radio Free Europe/Radio Liberty.
- Groeneveld, Jelger (24 March 2024). "2012 Elections Parliament of Georgia". Eastwatch.eu. Archived from the original on 10 July 2025.
- Managadze, Teona (22 March 2019). პარლამენტის დიასპორისა და კავკასიის საკითხთა კომიტეტის თავმჯდომარე ბექა ოდიშარია გახდა [Beka Odisharia Becomes Chair of Parliament's Diaspora and Caucasus Issues Committee]. First Channel (in Georgian).
- Managadze, Teona (18 April 2019). ზვიად კვაჭანტირაძე თამარ ჩუგოშვილს მოუწოდებს, ევროპის საბჭოს საპარლამენტო ასამბლეაში მისი და ეკა ბესელიას მივლინება უზრუნველყოს [Zviad Kvachantiradze calls on Tamar Chugoshvili to ensure he and Eka Beselia are deployed to the Parliamentary Assembly of the Council of Europe]. First Channel (in Georgian).
- Rukhadze, Tamta (27 May 2019). ეკა ბესელიამ, ზვიად კვაჭანტირაძემ და გედევან ფოფხაძემ ახალი პარტია „სამართლიანობისთვის“ შექმნეს [Eka Beselia, Zviad Kvachantiradze and Gedevan Popkhadze are creating a new "For Justice" party]. First Channel (in Georgian).
