= Task Force on Financial Integrity and Economic Development =

Global coalition

- Abbreviation: Task Force
- Formation: 2009
- Type: Coalition of NGOs and Governments
- Headquarters: 1100 17th Street, NW, Suite 505
- Location: Washington, D.C.
- Website: www.financialtaskforce.org

The Task Force on Financial Integrity and Economic Development was a unique global coalition of civil society organizations and governments launched in 2009 to address inequalities in the financial system that penalize billions of people. It was founded in Washington, D.C., USA, by the independent non-profit think tank Global Financial Integrity (GFI) based in the USA and with support from Norway. It is a global coalition of non-governmental organizations in more than 50 countries, including Germany, the Canadian International Development Agency (CIDA) and the Permanent Secretariat of the Leading Group on Innovative Financing for Development based in Paris. The goals are better transparency and accountability within the global financial system and detecting illegal financial flows. The Task Force was renamed the Financial Transparency Coalition in May 2013.

== History ==
In September 2009, during the summit of the Group of Twenty Industrialized and Emerging Countries (G20 states) in Pittsburgh, USA, the Task Force called for the serious impact of the shadow financial system on impoverished countries to be addressed and for concrete steps to be taken against capital flight to tax havens and shadow financial centres.

=== Previous conferences ===
- 16 to 17 September 2009 in Washington, USA
- 28 to 29 September 2010 in Bergen, Norway
- 6 to 7 October 2011 in Paris, France
- 3 April 2013 in New Delhi, a regional conference of the Task Force together with the Indian CBGA (Centre for Budget and Governance Accountability)

== Literature ==
- The European: Black accounts, empty coffers from 21 September 2011

== See also ==
- Illicit Financial Flows
- Raymond W. Baker
