= For Justice (Georgia) =

For Justice სამართლიანობისთვის
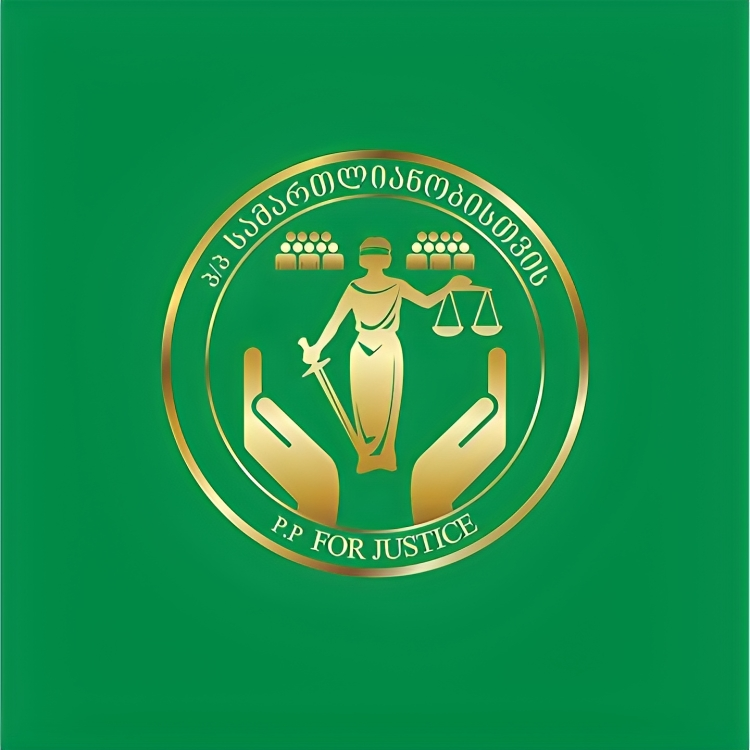
- Leader: Eka Beselia
- Founded: June 20, 2019
- Split from: Georgian Dream
- Ideology: Pro-Europeanism
- Political position: Centre
- Colors: Green; Gold
- Seats in Parliament: 0 / 150

For Justice (Georgian: სამართლიანობისთვის, romanized: samartlianobistvis) is a political party in Georgia established in 2019 by Eka Beselia.

== History ==
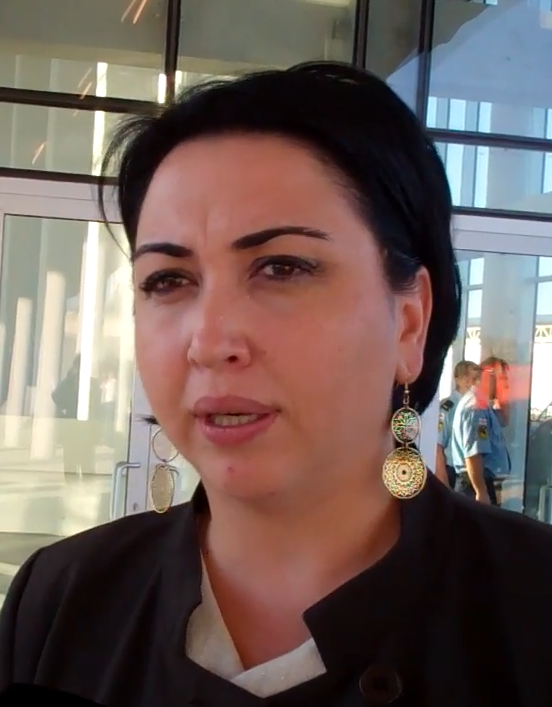
Eka Beselia, founder of For Justice party

After Eka Beselia's departure from Georgian Dream, the founding of For Justice was announced on May 27, 2019. The party held its first congress on June 20, 2019, where Gedevan Popkhadze and Zviad Kvachantiradze assumed key positions. However, both Popkhadze and Kvachantiradze later left the party to join the Solidarity Alliance of Georgia.

== Ideology ==
The party prioritizes judicial reform, with a focus on restructuring the court system to enhance its independence and eliminate the influence of judicial "clans".

In the summer of 2021, the party joined a declaration alongside 14 other political parties to support LGBT rights in Georgia ahead of the planned Pride march in Tbilisi.

For Justice is a signatory of the Georgian Charter, a framework introduced by President Salome Zourabichvili in response to the 2023–2024 Georgian protests.
