= Irakli Khakhubia =

Georgian (country) politician (1971–2022)

Irakli Khakhubia (Georgian: ირაკლი ხახუბია; 15 May 1971 – 27 October 2022) was a Georgian engineer and politician of the Georgian Dream party.

== Biography ==
Khakhubia graduated from Georgian Technical University with a degree in engineering majoring in Cars and Motor Car Manufacturing in 1994 and earned a certificate in International Economic Relations from Tbilisi Business and Marketing Higher School-Institute in 1997.

Khakhubia was a Majoritarian candidate in the 2016 election following his nomination by the Georgian prime minister Giorgi Kvirikashvili on 24 July 2016. On 11 August, his candidacy was challenged by members of his party for his alleged ties with former government and was accused of sponsoring United National Movement by Shalva Natelashvili. Khakhubia went on to win the election with 49 per cent votes defeating his opponent Murtaz Zodelava who received 32 per cent votes.

Khakhubia died on 27 October 2022, at the age of 51.
