= Lela Keburia =

Georgian politician

Lela Keburia (Georgian: ლელა ქებურია; September 21, 1976, Zugdidi, Georgian SSR, USSR) is a Georgian politician and philologist. She has been a Member of Parliament of Georgia since 2016. She was born on 21 September 1976 in Zugdidi. In 1997 she graduated from Tbilisi State University, Faculty of Philology. From 1998 to 2012 she taught Georgian Language and Literature at No.2 Zugdidi Public School. In 2012 she was acting Head of Zugdidi Educational Resource Center. From 2013 she was a senior teacher at No.2 Zugdidi Public School. Since 2016 she has been a member of parliament of Georgia. Since 2017 she has been a member of the political party European Georgia.
