= Eka Beselia =

Georgian lawyer and politician

- ეკა ბესელია
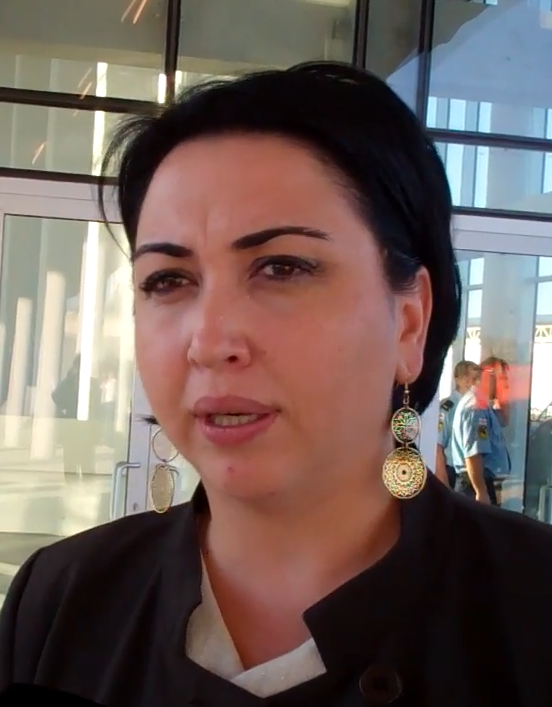
- Beselia in 2012

Member of Parliament of Georgia
- In office 21 October 2012 – 11 December 2020
- In office 7 June 2008 – 20 June 2008

Personal details
- Born: 6 November 1971 (age 54) Senaki, Georgian SSR, Soviet Union
- Party: United National Council (2007–2012); Georgian Dream (2012–2019); For Justice (since 2019)
- Education: Tbilisi State University

Eka Beselia (Georgian: ეკა ბესელია; born 6 November 1971) is a Georgian lawyer and politician. She was a member of the Parliament of Georgia from 2008 to 2020 and is the leader of For Justice.

== Early life and career ==
Born in Senaki, Beselia graduated from Tbilisi State University with a Bachelor of Laws. She was a lawyer of the Georgian Bar Association (1996-2012), a member of the Georgian Young Lawyers' Association (1997-2012) and in 1998, she founded the law firm “Eka and Company”, in which she was the director until 2012. In 2004, she was appointed as a Jurisprudence and Human Rights Protection Standard of the European Court of Human Rights by the United Nations Development Programme (UNDP). Since 2005 she is a visiting professor at the Training Centre of the Ministry of Justice of Georgia.

== Political career ==
In the 2008 parliamentary election, Beselia was number 6 on the list of the United National Council coalition. From 2008 to 2012, she was a member of the Parliament of the 7th legislature of Georgia. During the protests of 2009, Beselia was one of the oppositionists who demanded the resignation of Mikheil Saakashvili. From 2010 to 2012, she was an associate professor at the Caucasus University. In the 2012 parliamentary election, Beselia was elected from the Poti district by the Georgian Dream. In 2012, the Parliament of Georgia elected Beselia as the chairperson of the Committee on Human Rights Protection and Civil Integration. Since 2013, she has been a member of the Presidium of the Colchis Academy.

For the 2016 parliamentary election, Beselia placed 13th on the Georgian Dream list, being elected to the 9th Georgian parliament. On 27 December 2018, she resigned as Chair of the Parliament's Legal Committee. On 22 February 2019, she left Georgian Dream and on 20 June 2019 founded the For Justice party.
