= Solidarity Alliance of Georgia =

Solidarity Alliance of Georgia ჩვენი საქართველო — სოლიდარობის ალიანსი
- Chairman: Beka Natsvlishvili
- Chairman of the Political Council: Zviad Kvachantiradze
- General Secretary: Mariam Jashi
- Founded: June 7, 2020
- Split from: Georgian Dream; For Justice
- Ideology: Social democracy Pro-Europeanism
- Political position: Fiscal: Left-wing; Social: Centre
- Colors: Blue; White
- Seats in Parliament: 0 / 150

Solidarity Alliance of Georgia (Georgian: ჩვენი საქართველო — სოლიდარობის ალიანსი, romanized: chveni sakartvelo — solidarobis aliansi) is a political party in Georgia established on June 7, 2020, by the six Independent Members of the Parliament of Georgia and the Tbilisi City Council, which include Mariam Jashi, Beka Natsvlishvili, Levan Gogichaishvili, Zviad Kvachantiradze, Gedevan Popkhadze and Jaba Jishkariani.

== History ==
Solidarity Alliance of Georgia party was created on June 7, 2020, by independent MPs who left the majority in 2019 due to a fundamental disagreement on a number of issues. The most notorious of these issues was the issue of the selection of Supreme Court judges and the fall of the constitutional reform by the ruling party in November 2019 regarding the proportional electoral system.

After the fall of constitutional amendment, the Independent Deputies formed the new faction "Independent Lawmakers" on November 28, 2019, which initially consisted of 6 members. Mariam Jashi, chairwoman of the "Independent Lawmakers" faction, took part in the political dialogue between the ruling party and the opposition in February–March 2020. This political dialogue ended with the March 8 agreement on better electoral conditions for political parties and a less polarized environment. 5 Members of the faction "Independent Lawmakers" later became the founders of the Solidarity Alliance of Georgia.

The party held its first convention on June 7, during which delegates approved the election of Beka Natsvlishvili as chairman of the party, Zviad Kvachantiradze as chairman of the political council and Mariam Jashi as secretary-general of the party.
