= Nanuka Zhorzholiani =

Georgian television host and journalist

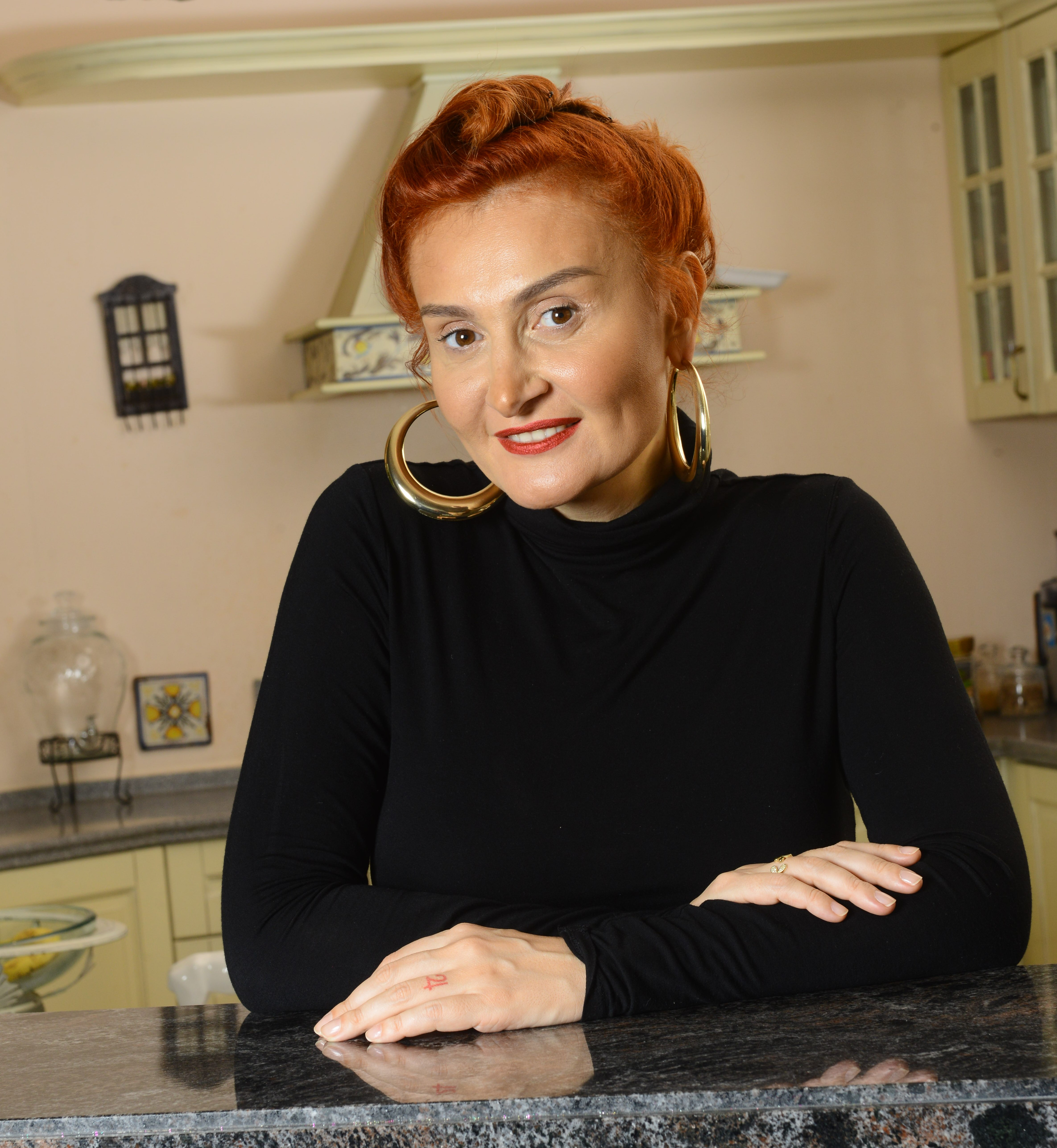
- Born: Nanuka Zhorzholiani; 26 June 1979 (age 46); Tbilisi, Georgian SSR
- Education: Tbilisi State University
- Occupations: television host, journalist
- Years active: 1999–present

Nanuka Zhorzholiani (Georgian: ნანუკა (ნანა) ჟორჟოლიანი; born 26 June 1979) is a Georgian television host and journalist.

Zhorzholiani was born on 26 June 1979. She graduated from Tbilisi State University's Faculty of Journalism. In 1999, she started to work for First Channel for the morning TV emission "Alioni". In 2001, she moved to Rustavi 2 covering political news. In 2008, she was a reporter during the Russian-Georgian War. Since 2009, she has been an author and TV anchor of a Georgian Talk show called Nanuka Zhorzholiani's Show on Rustavi 2, from 2019 show changed its name and moved to new channel, Mtavari Arkhi. From 2005 to 2007, she was the head of the NATO Information Center.

Zhorzholiani has two children: Mariam Geguchadze and Saba Kodua.
