= Badri Basishvili =

Georgian politician

Member of the Parliament of Georgia
- In office 17 January 2020 – 11 December 2020

Personal details
- Born: 20 January 1977 (age 49)
- Party: United National Movement

Badri Basishvili (Georgian: ბადრი ბასიშვილი; born January 20, 1977, in the village Kevkhvi) is a Georgian lawyer and political figure. Order of Honor Cavalier (2013).

In 2004 he graduated from Legia and Company, Faculty of Law, University.

Adviser to the Representative of the President of Georgia in 2004–2005, Advisor to the Georgian-Ossetian Conflict Resolution Service; 2006-2008 Chairman of the Kurdish Municipality Sakrebulo; Majoritarian MP of the 7th convocation of Georgia in 2008-2012 from ლი85 Liakhvi constituency (Election bloc "United National Movement - for Victorious Georgia"), Parliamentary Committee on Sports and Youth Affairs, Committee on Regional Policy, Self-Government and Mountainous Regions, Territorial Integrity Member of the commission. Deputy Presidential Representative in Shida Kartli in 2012-2013 . Member of the Parliament of Georgia of the 9th convocation from January 17, 2020 (replaced Nika Melia), member of the faction "National Movement" and the Parliamentary Committee on Agrarian Issues.

In the 2020 parliamentary elections in Georgia, the United National Movement nominated him a majoritarian candidate in the Gori-Kaspi constituency.
