= Illicit financial flows =

Form of illegal capital flight

Illicit financial flows, in economics, are a form of illegal capital flight that occurs when money is illegally earned, transferred, or spent. This money is intended to disappear from any record in the country of origin, and earnings on the stock of illicit financial flows outside a country generally do not return to the country of origin.

Illicit financial flows can be generated in a variety of ways that are not revealed in national accounts or balance of payments figures, including trade mispricing, bulk cash movements, hawala transactions, and smuggling.

There are several economic models used to provide estimates of illicit financial flows and capital flight. The two most common methods are the World Bank Residual Model and the DOTS-based Trade Mispricing Model, which uses the IMF's Direction of Trade Statistics (DOTS) database to analyze discrepancies in trade statistics between partner countries. Another way to estimate trade mispricing is with the IPPS-based model, which was developed by John Zdanowicz of Florida International University. This method uses individual import and export transactions of the United States with the rest of the world to find inconsistencies in export and import prices. Economists also use hot money (Narrow) Method and the Dooley Method in these estimates.

In recent years, United Nations Conference on Trade and Development (UNCTAD) and The United Nations Office on Drugs and Crime (UNODC) have created a conceptual framework for measuring illicit financial flows (IFF's) which is consistent with SNA concepts.

A 2013 paper, authorized by Raymond W. Baker, Director of the Global Financial Integrity estimated illicit financial flows "out of developing countries are approximately $1 trillion a year". This study also found that China, Russia, and Mexico accounted for the three largest shares of worldwide illicit financial flows.

The United Nations Sustainable Development Goal 16 has a target to significantly reduce illicit financial flows and strengthen recovery and return of stolen assets by 2030.

== Pakistan ==
Estimates of illicit financial flows in Pakistan are estimated to be at over $10 billion as of 2015, escaping taxation and being siphoned off outside the country. One third of the population of Pakistan lives below the poverty line.

== Eswatini ==
Eswatini, (named Swaziland at the time) lost a record of $1.139 billion to illicit financial flows in 2007, and approximately $556 million in 2012.

== See also ==
- Money laundering
- Task Force on Financial Integrity and Economic Development
- Tax evasion
