= Raymond W. Baker =

American businessman (born 1935)

- Born: October 30, 1935 (age 90); Shreveport, LA
- Education: Harvard Business School (M.B.A.); Georgia Institute of Technology
- Scientific career
- Fields: International Business
- Workplaces: Global Financial Integrity

Raymond W. Baker (born October 30, 1935) is an American businessman, scholar, author, and "authority on financial crime." He is the founder and president of Global Financial Integrity, a research and advocacy organization in Washington, DC working to curtail illicit financial flows. Raymond Baker was awarded the ASAP Lifetime Achievement Award by Academics Stand Against Poverty.

== Education ==
Baker is a 1960 graduate of Harvard Business School, and a 1957 graduate of Georgia Institute of Technology, where he was a member of the ANAK Society.

== Career ==
Raymond Baker started his professional career by working as a businessman in Nigeria in various positions for 15 years. By the mid-1970s, the Bakers found that Nigeria had become unfit for an expatriate family with young children, so they moved to the United States and settled in the Washington, D.C. area. For the next 10 years, Raymond Baker did extensive business in Central and South America, other parts of Africa, Australia and New Zealand, Southeast Asia, and with the People’s Republic of China. Then in the late 1980s, he shifted to providing trade and financial advisory services to governments in developing nations. With this accumulation of experiences, he associated with the Brookings Institution in 1996 as a guest scholar in economic studies.

In 1996, Raymond Baker received a grant from the John D. and Catherine T. MacArthur Foundation for a project entitled, “Flight Capital, Poverty and Free-Market Economics.” The project took him to 23 countries where he interviewed over 335 bankers, politicians, government officials, economists, attorneys, tax collectors, security officers, and social scientists on the relationships between commercial tax evasion, bribery, money laundering, and economic growth.

In 2006, Baker founded Global Financial Integrity, the Washington, DC–based research and advocacy organization of which he remains president, with the goal of quantifying and analyzing illicit financial flows while formulating and promoting policy solutions to curb them. Under Baker's leadership, GFI has published several economic reports estimating that nearly US$1 trillion per year flows illicitly out of developing countries. Driving Baker's passion about the issue is his underlying belief that these illegal outflows of capital are the greatest economic problem facing the world's poor. Baker has been quoted as saying, "This $1 trillion or more a year of illicit money that flows across borders and the structure that facilitates its movement is not only the biggest loophole in the global economic system. It is also the most damaging economic condition hurting the poor in developing and transitional economies."

In January 2009, Baker brought together a coalition of research and advocacy organizations and over 50 governments to form the Task Force on Financial Integrity and Economic Development – an organization which advocates for transparency in the global financial system. He served as the first director of the Task Force from its inception in 2009 through the beginning of 2013.

Baker's "work explaining how $1 trillion in dirty money leaves poor countries each year has helped get financial transparency onto the agenda of world leaders." A focus of his recent work has been on linking illicit financial flows to human rights abuses and economic inequality.

Baker is additionally a member of the High Level Panel on Illicit Financial Flows from Africa, established by the United Nations Economic Commission for Africa in February 2012. The panel is chaired by former South African President Thabo Mbeki.

Baker serves as a member of the World Economic Forum's Council on Illicit Trade, and he has testified multiple times before congressional committees in the United States House of Representatives and the United States Senate on money laundering, corruption, and illegal capital flight.

== Published works ==
In 2005, Baker published Capitalism's Achilles Heel: Dirty Money and How to Renew the Free-Market System. This comprehensive study of illicit capital flows which includes a full exploration of their context and root causes, financial impact of world economy as well as avenues for their possible control and curtailing, confirmed him as a recognized international authority on corruption, money laundering, growth, and foreign policy issues concerning developing and transitional economies and their impact upon western economic and foreign interests.

A former guest scholar at the Brookings Institution and former senior fellow at the Center for International Policy, Baker is also the author of The Biggest Loophole in the Free-Market System, Illegal Flight Capital: Dangers for Global Stability, How Dirty Money Binds the Poor, and other works.

== See also ==
- Global Financial Integrity
- Illicit financial flows
