= Leading Group on Innovative Financing for Development =

- Logo
- Secretariat: Paris, France
- Membership: 55 member states; 4 observer states; 16 international organizations; Several NGOs

Leaders
  - Secretary General: Julien Meimon

Establishment
  - as the "Leading Group on Solidarity Levies to Fund Development": 1 March 2006
  - as current name: June 2009
- Website http://www.leadinggroup.org

The Leading Group on Innovative Financing for Development is a global platform made up of 55 member countries with differing levels of development, operating alongside international organisations and NGOs. Formerly known as the Leading Group on Solidarity Levies to Fund Development, the Leading Group seeks to promote the implementation and definition of innovative financing mechanisms around the world.

Formed in 2006, the Leading Group is coordinated by the Permanent Secretariat which is located in Paris at the French Ministry of Foreign and European Affairs.

== Membership ==
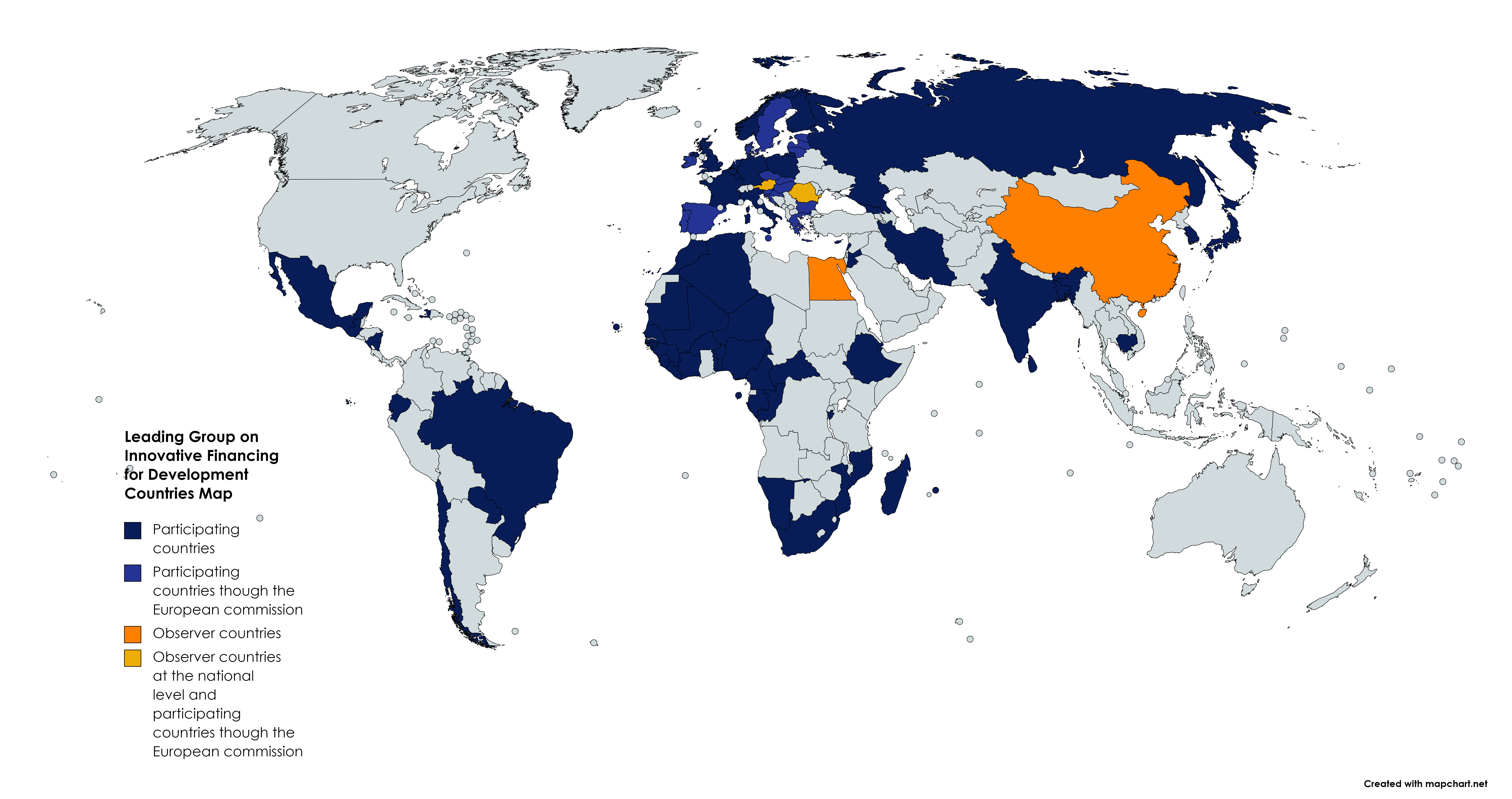
Leading Group on Innovative Financing for Development Countries Map

The following countries are currently members of the Leading Group:

Algeria, Bangladesh, Belgium, Benin, Brazil, Burkina Faso, Cambodia, Cameroon, Cape Verde, Central African Republic, Chile, Congo, Cote d’Ivoire, Cyprus, Djibouti, Ethiopia, European Commission, Finland, France, Gabon, Germany, Georgia, Guatemala, Guinea, Haiti, India, Italy, Japan, Jordan, Lebanon, Liberia, Luxembourg, Madagascar, Mali, Mauritania, Mauritius, Mexico, Morocco, Mozambique, Namibia, Nicaragua, Niger, Nigeria, Norway, Poland, the Republic of Korea, Romania, Sao Tome and Principe, Saudi Arabia, Senegal, Sierra Leone, South Africa, Spain, Togo, United Kingdom and Uruguay.

The following countries serve as observer countries in the Leading Group:

Austria, China, Egypt and Romania

The following international organisations are currently members of the Leading Group:

- United Nations
- African Development Bank
- World Bank
- Inter-American Development Bank
- Asian Development Bank
- FAO
- International Monetary Fund
- United Nations Population Fund (UNPF)
- The Global Fund
- OECD
- WHO
- UNAIDS
- WFP
- International Fund for Agricultural Development (IFAD)
- United Nations Procurement Division (UNPD)
- UNICEF
