= Sir Charles Pole, 1st Baronet =

Royal Navy officer, colonial administrator and politician (1757–1830)

Admiral of the Fleet Sir Charles Pole GCB Bt
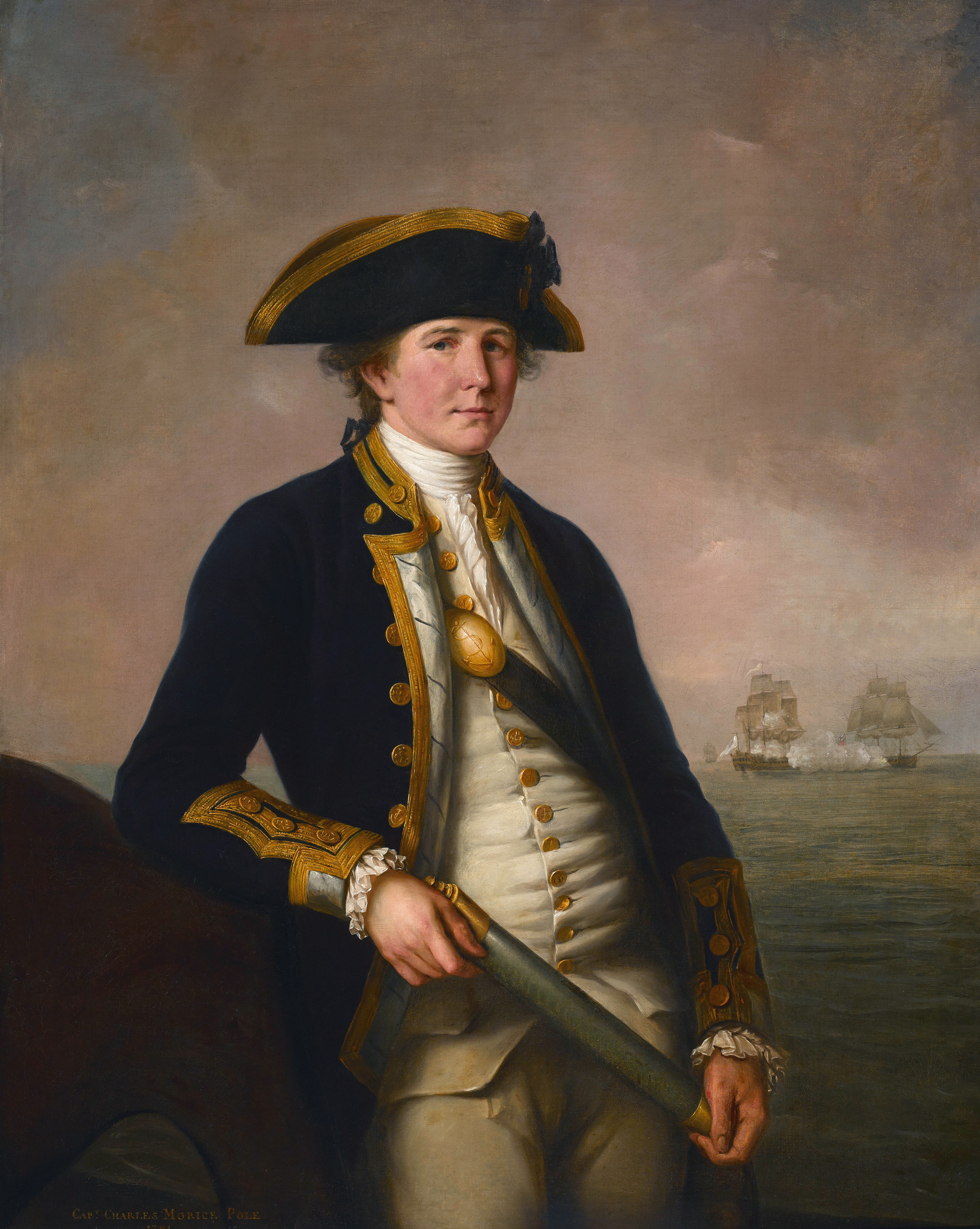
- Portrait by John Francis Rigaud, 1781
- Born: 18 January 1757; England
- Died: 6 September 1830 (aged 73); Aldenham Abbey, Hertfordshire
- Military career
- Allegiance: Great Britain; United Kingdom
- Branch: Royal Navy
- Service years: 1770–1806
- Rank: Admiral of the Fleet
- Commands: HMS Cormorant; HMS Britannia; HMS Hussar; HMS Success; HMS Crown; HMS Melampus; HMS Illustrious; HMS Colossus; Baltic Fleet
- Conflicts: American War of Independence; Siege of Pondicherry (1778); Action of 16 March 1782; French Revolutionary Wars; Siege of Toulon (1793); Napoleonic Wars
- Awards: Knight Grand Cross of the Order of the Bath

Viceregal styles of Sir Charles Pole
- Reference style: His Excellency
- Spoken style: Your Excellency

Admiral of the Fleet Sir Charles Morice Pole, 1st Baronet, GCB (18 January 1757 – 6 September 1830) was a Royal Navy officer, colonial administrator and politician. As a junior officer he saw action at the siege of Pondicherry in India during the American Revolutionary War. After taking command of the fifth-rate HMS Success he captured and then destroyed the Spanish frigate Santa Catalina in the Strait of Gibraltar in the action of 16 March 1782 later in that War.

After capturing the French privateer Vanneau in June 1793, Pole took part in the siege of Toulon at an early stage of the French Revolutionary Wars. He went on to be governor and commander-in-chief of Newfoundland and then commanded the Baltic Fleet later in the War. He also served as a Lord Commissioner of the Admiralty on the Admiralty Board led by Lord Howick during the Napoleonic Wars.

== Early career ==
Born the second son of Reginald Pole and Anne Pole (née Buller), Pole was educated at Plympton Grammar School before joining the Royal Naval Academy at Portsmouth in January 1770. He was appointed to the fifth-rate HMS Thames in 1772 and then transferred to the fourth-rate HMS Salisbury on the East Indies Station in December 1773. Promoted to lieutenant on 26 June 1777, he was assigned to the sixth-rate HMS Seahorse and then transferred to the fourth-rate HMS Rippon in 1778 and saw action at the siege of Pondicherry in India in October 1778 during the American Revolutionary War. He then became commanding officer of the sloop HMS Cormorant and was sent home with the despatches.

Promoted to captain on 22 March 1779, Pole became commanding officer of the first-rate HMS Britannia, flagship of Rear Admiral George Darby, Second-in-Command of the Channel Squadron. He transferred to the command of the sixth-rate HMS Hussar in 1780 which ran aground off Hell Gate although he was acquitted at the subsequent court-martial. He was given command of the fifth-rate HMS Success and in her, while undertaking an escort mission in support of the armed store-ship HMS Vernon, captured and then destroyed the Spanish frigate Santa Catalina in the Strait of Gibraltar in the action of 16 March 1782.

Following the end of the war in 1783 Pole was given command of the third-rate HMS Crown before becoming Groom of the Bedchamber to the Duke of Clarence on 1 June 1789. He became commanding officer of the fifth-rate HMS Melampus in May 1790, in which he observed the French fleet at Brest during the Nootka Crisis.

While in command of Melampus Pole was involved in a conflict between Lieutenant Richard Hancorn and Midshipman William Butterfield. Upon joining Melampus's crew Hancorn provoked the anger of the midshipmen by handing out harsh and unfair punishments for minor transgressions. Butterfield, in particular, was lashed to a grating and pulled to the top of the mizzen in a public display, because he had engaged in his ordinary duties without express permission. An explosive incident occurred soon after when Hancorn was followed by Butterfield and four other midshipmen and found himself challenged to five separate fights. He responded by reminding them that as a superior officer such behaviour was totally reprehensible, finally vacating the situation and prompting a further torrent of insults and hisses. Pole reported the incident to Vice-admiral Robert Roddam, from whom it was then referred to the Attorney-General. In June 1791, the offending midshipmen were ordered to deliver a sincere apology to Hancorn.

Pole became commanding officer of the third-rate HMS Illustrious in 1791 and was transferred to the command of the third-rate HMS Colossus in the Mediterranean Fleet in early 1793 and, after capturing the French privateer Vanneau in June 1793 took part in the siege of Toulon at an early stage of the French Revolutionary Wars.

== Senior command ==
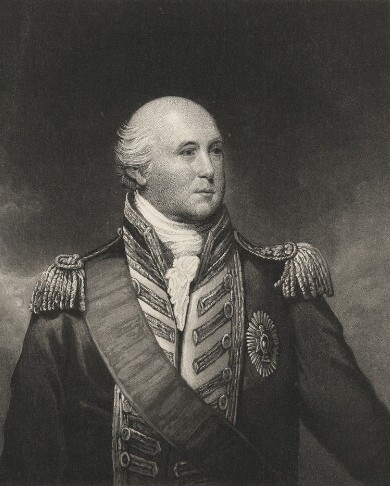
Pole, later in his career

Promoted to rear-admiral on 1 June 1795, Pole became Second-in-Command of the West Indies Station with his flag in HMS Colossus. He went on to be Captain of the Fleet in the Channel Squadron under Lord Bridport in March 1797. It fell to Pole to advise the British Admiralty about the strikes by sailors demanding better pay and conditions which came to be known as the Spithead mutiny. Pole returned to Spithead with negotiators from the Admiralty but talks broke down when Admiral Sir Alan Gardner threatened to hang all the mutineers.

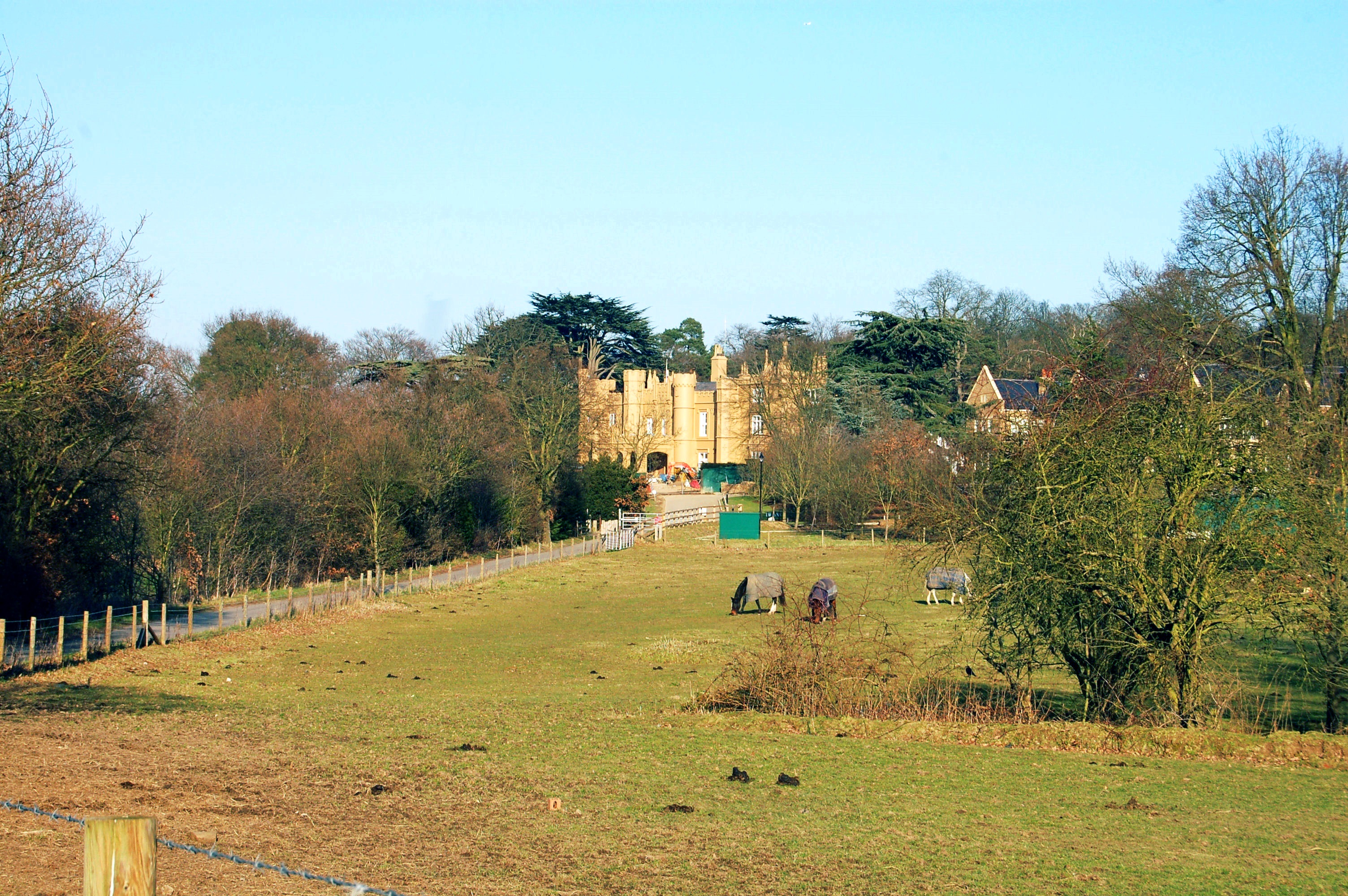
Aldenham Abbey, Pole's house in Hertfordshire

Pole became governor and commander-in-chief of Newfoundland on 3 June 1800: following his appointment he focussed on dealing with a serious outbreak of smallpox that had taken place, deploying the latest practices in inoculation and establishing a "Committee for the Relief of the Poor". Promoted to vice-admiral on 1 January 1801, he became Commander-in-Chief of the Baltic Fleet, with his flag in the second-rate HMS St George in June 1801.

Pole was created a baronet on 18 August 1801 and then became Member of Parliament for Newark in 1802. In December 1802 he was asked to chair a commission of naval inquiry into abuses in the civil administration which reported in May 1803.

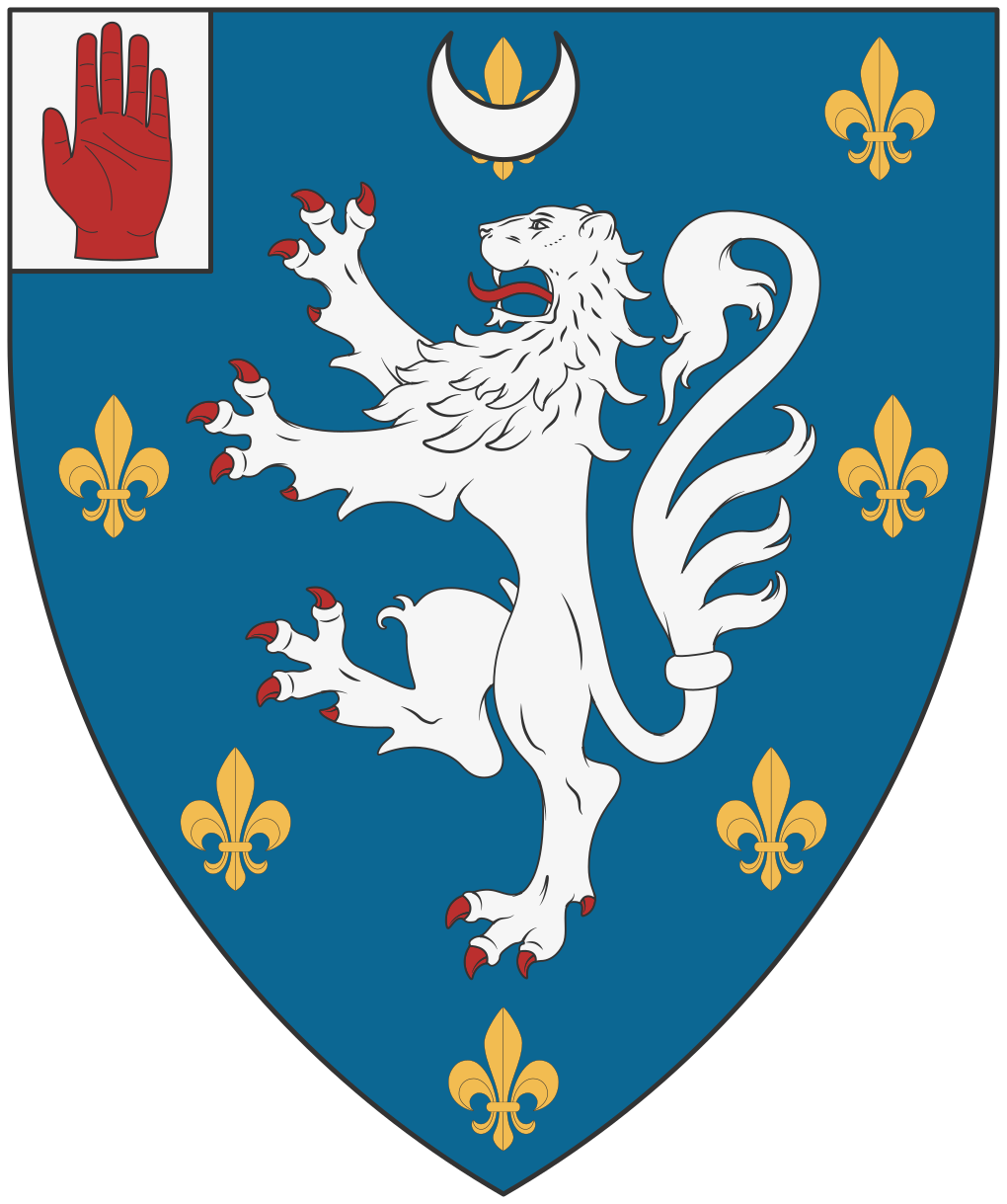
The coat of arms of Sir Charles Pole, baronets (aka "Pole of the Navy").

Promoted to full admiral on 9 November 1805, Pole was present at the funeral of Lord Nelson in January 1806. He became a Lord Commissioner of the Admiralty on the Admiralty Board led by Lord Howick in February 1806. He was also elected Member of Parliament for Plymouth in November 1806. However he stood down as a Lord Commissioner when the Second Portland Ministry took power in March 1807: in Parliament he became increasingly critical of the new Government particularly in relation to their handling of the Battle of Copenhagen in 1807 (which led to the Anglo-Russian War) and the Convention of Sintra in 1808 (which allowed the French to evacuate their troops from Portugal).

During a debate in the British House of Commons on 27 February 1807 over the proposed Slave Trade Act 1807, which would abolish British involvement in the Atlantic slave trade, Pole stated his opposition to the act and

declared himself so impressed with the impolicy of the abolition, that he was induced, in every stage, to thwart a bill, ruinous to the colonies and to the commerce of the country; a measure which would put into the hands of the enemy, those objects on which he had so steadfastly fixed his attention, and the want of which, in a great degree, restrained the progress of his arms, and prevented the accomplishment of those menaces, with which he had so long threatened this empire. It was a great sacrifice to risk one-third of the British exports, besides imports to a large amount, independent of the employment given to such a number of seamen, as were annually engaged in the trade with Africa.

Pole was appointed a Knight Commander of the Order of the Bath on 12 April 1815 and advanced to Knight Grand Cross of the Order of the Bath on 20 April 1818. He became Sheriff of Hertfordshire in November 1824, and having been promoted to Admiral of the Fleet on 22 July 1830, he died at his home, Aldenham Abbey, on 6 September 1830.

== Family ==
In 1792 Pole married Henrietta Goddard; they had two daughters.

== See also ==
- Governors of Newfoundland
- List of people from Newfoundland and Labrador

== Sources ==
- Heathcote, Tony (2002). The British Admirals of the Fleet 1734 – 1995. Pen & Sword. ISBN 0-85052-835-6.

Parliament of the United Kingdom
Preceded by Mark Wood and Henry Willoughby	Member of Parliament for Newark; 1802–1806; With: Henry Willoughby	Succeeded by Stapleton Cotton and Henry Willoughby
Preceded by William Elford; Thomas Tyrwhitt	Member of Parliament for Plymouth; 1806–1818; With: Thomas Tyrwhitt to 1812; Colonel Benjamin Bloomfield 1812; Sir William Congreve from 1812	Succeeded by Sir Thomas Byam Martin; Sir William Congreve
Court offices
Preceded by Earl of Mount Charles	Master of the Robes; 1830	Succeeded by Sir George Seymour
Political offices
Preceded by William Waldegrave	Commodore Governor of Newfoundland; 1800–1801	Succeeded by James Gambier
Baronetage of the United Kingdom
New creation	Baronet (of the Navy); 1801–1830	Extinct
Preceded by Synge baronets	Pole baronets of the Navy; 12 September 1801	Succeeded by Ferguson baronets
