= Vanneau =

Vanneau may refer to:

- Vanneau (ship), a ship of the Royal French Navy launched in 1782
- Godefroy de la Roche Vanneau, bishop of Langres
- Morane-Saulnier Vanneau, a French two seat trainer aircraft built by Morane-Saulnier

== See also ==
- La Roche-Vanneau, a commune in the Côte-d'Or department of eastern France
- Le Vanneau-Irleau, a commune in the Deux-Sèvres department of western France
- Vaneau, a station of the Paris Metro
- Vano (disambiguation)
