= Vano =

Vano may refer to:

- the Lovono language spoken in the Solomon Islands, sometimes described under the name Vano

In addition, Vano is both a given name and a surname. Among Georgians, it is a diminutive of the name Ivane. It may refer to:

- Robert Vano (born 1948), Slovak photographer
- Tom Vano (born 1970), American field hockey player
- Vano Merabishvili (born 1968), Georgian politician and Prime Minister of Georgia
- Vano Muradeli (1908–1970), Soviet Georgian composer
- Vano Siradeghyan (born 1946), Armenian politician and writer
- Vano Tarkhnishvili (born 1981), Georgian actor
