= Ivane =

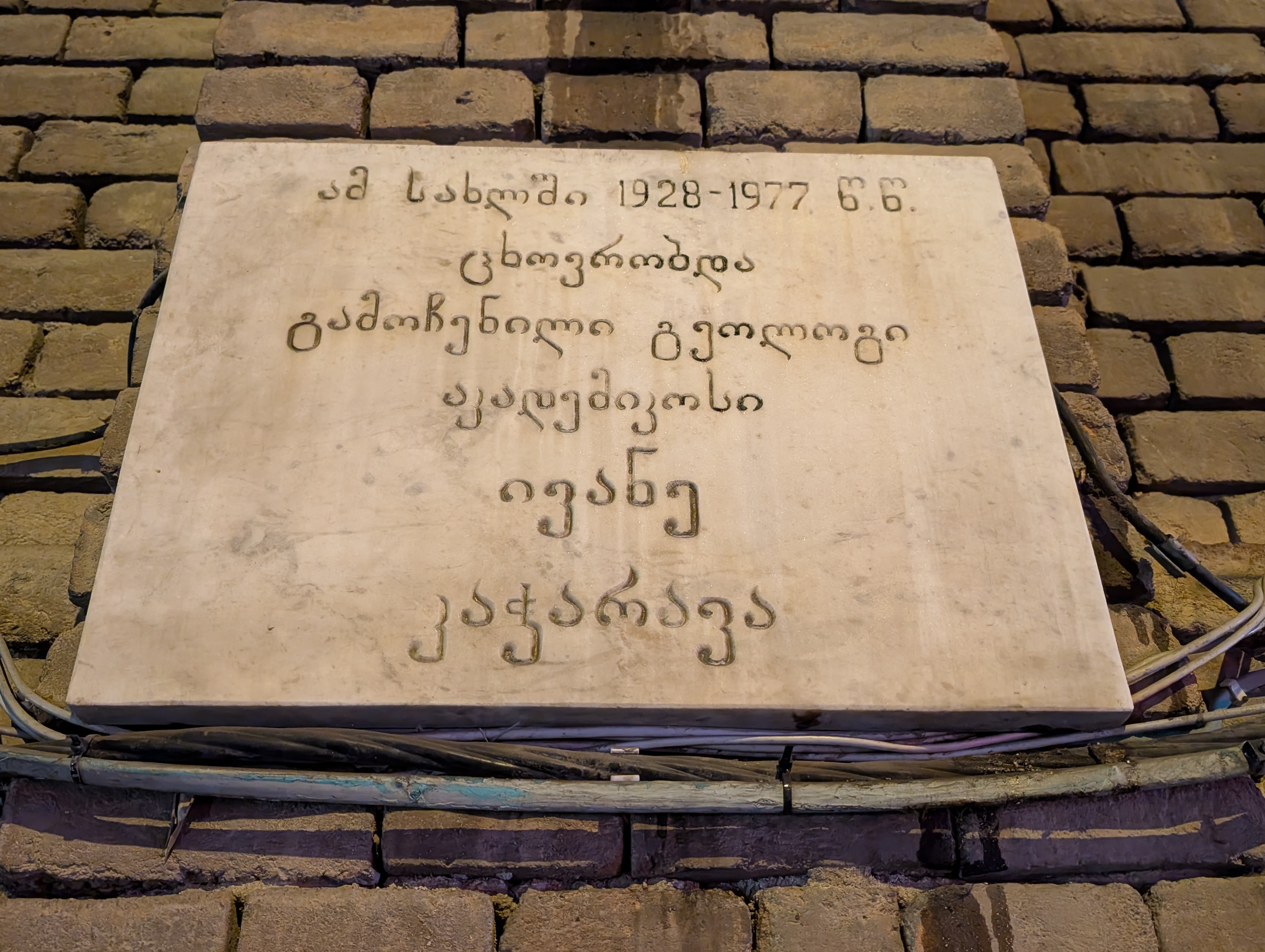
Ivane Kacharava memorial plaque

Ivane (Georgian: ივანე) is a masculine Georgian given name. It is a cognate of the name John. Notable people with the name include:

- Ivane Abazasdze, Georgian feudal lord, a duke of Kartli under King Bagrat IV of Georgia
- Ivane Amilakhvari (1829–1905), Georgian nobleman and a military commander in the Imperial Russian service
- Ivane Andronikashvili (1798–1868), Georgian noble and general in the Imperial Russian service
- Ivane Bagration of Mukhrani (1812–1895), Georgian noble and general in the Imperial Russian service
- Ivane I, Duke of Kldekari (died 1080), Georgian general and duke of Kldekari, Argveti, and Orbeti-Samshvilde
- Ivane Javakhishvili (1876–1940), Georgian historian
- Ivane Kazbegi, Polish-Georgian military officer
- Ivane Machabeli (1854–1898), Georgian writer, journalist and public figure known for his translations of Shakespeare
- Ivane Nanuashvili (1902-1974), Georgian military activist
- Ivane Urrubal (born 1997), Mozambican footballer
