= Ahmed-Pasha Khimshiashvili =

Ottoman politician

Ahmed Bey, subsequently Ahmed-Pasha Khimshiashvili (1781 – October 1836) was a Muslim Georgian nobleman of the Khimshiashvili clan from Adjara, which he ruled as an autonomous ruler (bey) under the Ottoman Empire after 1818. He played a notable role in the Caucasian theatre of the Russo-Turkish War (1828–29) in which he failed to recapture Akhaltsikhe for the Ottomans, but checked Russian attempts to invade Adjara. Subsequently, Ahmed abandoned his earlier clandestine diplomacy with the Russians and served loyally to the Ottoman government as a commander in Kars and Erzurum. He died fighting the Kurdish tribesmen in 1836.

== Early career ==
Ahmed Bey was a son of Selim Bey of Adjara, a derebey ("the lord of the valleys") of Upper Adjara, who was put to death, in 1815, for having opposed the Ottoman control of the Muslim Georgian fiefdoms. After this, Ahmed Bey and his brother Mustafa Bey fled to their in-laws in the neighboring Georgian principality of Guria, a subject of the Russian Empire. In 1818, once the Ottoman punitive force left Adjara, Ahmed returned to his native village of Nigazeuli, expanded his family's powerbase in Adjara and established himself at Khulo, where he built a castle on the ruins of an old Christian monastery. He also attempted to extend his influence to Guria, where he supported anti-Russian opposition and threatened Russian loyalists. On 9 April 1819, Ahmed Bey made a surprise raid into Guria, burned down the village of Askana, and carried off many prisoners. On his way back, already in Adjara, the Gurians overtook him and defeated in a pitched battle, freeing their countrymen. At least 34 Adjarians, including an agha, were killed; Ahmed's cousin, two Turkish officials, 12 standard-bearers, and 79 others were taken captive. An incident induced the Russian troops to more energetically engage in the frontier districts, leading to a series of reprisal raids into the Muslim settlements.

== Russo-Turkish War (1828–29) ==
The Khimshiashvili family's rule in Adjara was largely autonomous of the central Ottoman government, which, facing a new war with Russia in 1828, was in urgent need of local irregulars to reinforce its own weak forces in the southwest Caucasus and had to rely on the services of local beys. On the other hand, the Russian commander-in-chief Count Paskevich tried, through General Bebutov, to buy Ahmed's loyalty by the promise of security of his estates, the rank of a Russian general, an Imperial order, and a state pension. Eventually, Ahmed was won over by the Ottomans by granting him the right to rule Akhaltsikh as a pasha if he would recapture that city from the Russians.

In February 1829, Ahmed, at the head of some 20,000 Adjarian and Turkish troops, made a swift advance towards Akhaltsikhe, took control of the city and besieged its citadel defended by General Bebutov. The garrison held out and Ahmed's brother Avdi Bey was unable to prevent the Russian reinforcements from arriving though the Borjomi Gorge. On 4 March 1829, Ahmed retreated into Adjara. He launched another offensive against Akhaltsikh in April, but was defeated by General Burtsev at Tsurtskabi on 30 April.

After these defeats, Ahmed and Bebutov renewed clandestine negotiations, which failed completely after the latter was succeeded by General Osten-Sacken as a commander in Akhaltsikh. In August 1829, Osten-Sacken took advantage of Ahmed's absence in the area of Batum and invaded Upper Adjara with a force of 3,000. He occupied and sacked Khulo, but found himself under siege in a difficult mountainous terrain and had to fight his way, with heavy casualties inflicted by disease and Adjarian guerrillas, back to Akhaltsikh. The second attempt by the Russians to invade Adjara, this time by General Hesse from Guria, was dashed at Tsikhisdziri in September 1829. The road to Guria now lay open for the Adjarians, but the news of a peace treaty arrived and all operations in the area were halted.

== Later career ==
The 1829 Treaty of Adrianople left Akhaltsikh in the Russian hands and Ahmed, finally, opted for the loyal service to the Ottomans. He became a beylerbey of Çıldır and Kars and of Erzurum in 1836. He had a rank of serasker and was awarded a number of Ottoman orders. He died while fighting the Kurdish rebels in northern Anatolia in October 1836. Ahmed was succeeded as a bey in Upper Adjara by his brother, Kor Hussein Bey, as his son, Şerif, was still in his minority.
