= Abazasdze =

Georgian noble family

The Abazasdze family (Georgian: აბაზასძე) was a noble family in Georgia with a surge in prominence in the 11th century.

== History ==
The Abazasdze are hypothesized by the Georgian historian Nodar Shoshiashvili to have descended from the house of Tbeli of Kartli. Tbeli Abazay, mentioned in an 11th-century Georgian inscription from the Bortsvisjvari church at Tbeti, may have been the family's eponymous founder, while Ivane Abazasdze, eristavi ("duke") of Kartli, could have been his grandson. Ivane Abazasdze wielded influence in the 1030s, during the early reign of Bagrat IV of Georgia. The contemporaneous Georgian hagiography Vita of George the Athonite by Giorgi Mtsire described Ivane Abazasdze and his four brothers as "heroic and strong in their wealth and boastful of their arms and proud of the multitude of their army." Their failed plot to assassinate Bagrat IV resulted in the family's loss of much of their influence and prestige. They are only rarely mentioned in subsequent historical records, but the Abazasdze appear to have survived in Upper Kartli as royal vassals, aznauri, from the 15th century to the 18th.

By the closing years of the 14th century, a branch of the family was established in Georgia's eastern region of Kakheti and, in the person of Khimshia Abazasdze-Marileli ("of Marili"), who had fought Timur's invading army in 1399, was enfeoffed by the Georgian crown of the former estates of the Abuletisdze in Eliseni in 1405. According to the historian Cyril Toumanoff, the latter-day Kakhetian noble family of Khimshiashvili descended from these "Abazads of Marili".
