= Wall Hall =

English country house

Coordinates: 51°40′58″N 0°21′25″W

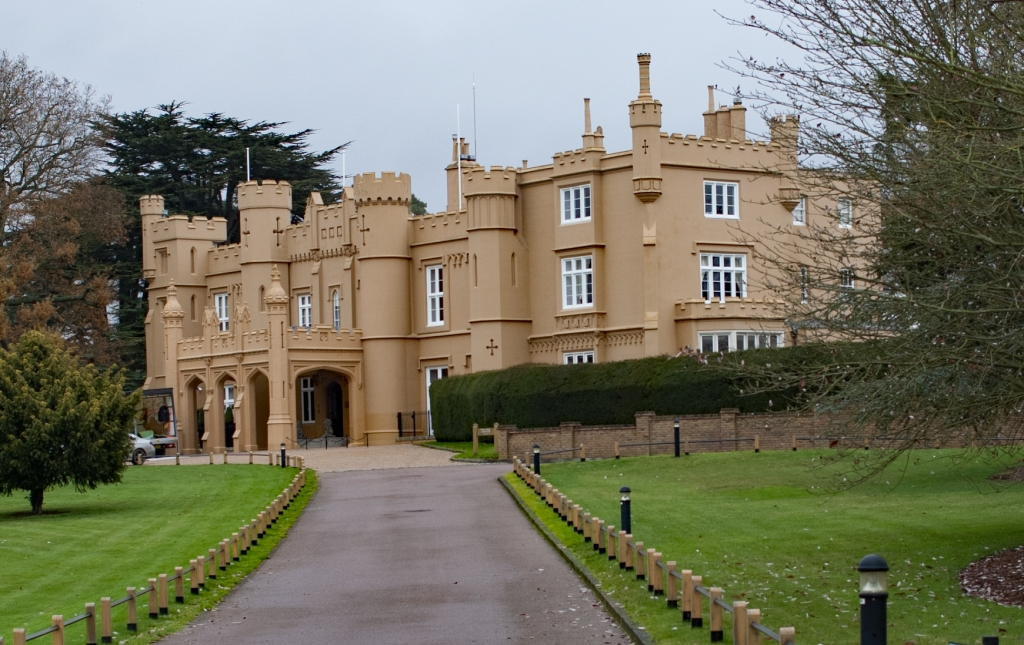

- Location within Hertfordshire
- Location: Aldenham, Hertfordshire, England

Listed Building – Grade II
- Official name: Wall Hall (The Mansion)
- Designated: 12 August 1985
- Reference no.: 1346897

National Register of Historic Parks and Gardens
- Official name: Wall Hall
- Designated: 17 February 2000
- Reference no.: 1001455

Wall Hall, originally known as Aldenham Abbey, is a country house at Aldenham in Hertfordshire, England. The main house and several ancillary buildings are Grade II listed. The gardens and parkland are also on the Register of Historic Parks and Gardens of Special Historic Interest in England.

The 18th-century building was remodelled and expanded by George Woodford Thellusson in the early 19th century. It was owned by several wealthy men, including Sir Charles Pole and J. P. Morgan Jr. During World War I, a Voluntary Aid Detachment hospital was opened in the garage. The attached Church Farm was used as a hospital in World War II, with the house being used by the War Office Selection Boards, Special Operations Executive and Political Warfare Executive under John Hackett and Walter Bryce Gallie.

It later became a teacher training college and a residence of the University of Hertfordshire before being turned into flats, with the extensive grounds and parkland being used as a golf course.

== History ==
The first record of the manor is from the 13th century when it was held by the Abbey of St Albans, who controlled it until the Dissolution of the Monasteries. The house, which has an 18th-century core, was owned by Thomas Neate; it was then bought and expanded in the gothic style for George Woodford Thellusson, a wealthy banker, and completed in 1802.

Around 1800, Thellusson also built a brick sham ruin with cement rendering in the grounds. An icehouse was also brick built and covered with earth. A picturesque gothic folly with a turret was also constructed at the same time. The granary, which also dates from around 1800, has a timber frame and slate roof. The grounds were laid out by Humphry Repton. It was then acquired by Admiral Sir Charles Pole, 1st Baronet in 1812. He renamed it Aldenham Abbey.

The house passed to William Stuart, Pole's son-in-law, and then remained in the Stuart family until 1910, when it became the property of the banker J. P. Morgan Jr. The wellhead with a circular bowl with carvings on the outside, within the grounds was put in place by J. P. Morgan in the early 20th century, having been moved from a site where it has stood since the 17th century or earlier. The house and estate were then acquired by Hertfordshire County Council.

During World War I, the hall provided support for wounded soldiers with a Voluntary Aid Detachment hospital being opened in the garage. By 1916, it had been expanded to hold 30 beds, and it had increased again to 48 beds in 1917.

In Second World War, a Red Cross hospital managed by Thurstan Holland-Hibbert, 4th Viscount Knutsford, was established at Church Farm, on the estate, while the main house was as an administrative centre by the British Army and housed the War Office Selection Boards. While based at Wall Hall, the selection process was made less subjective and psychologists were brought in to develop intelligence testing and extended interviews for officer candidates.

Part of the building and estate was used by the Special Operations Executive (SOE) and designated as "STS 39". It moved to Wall Hall in 1943, and was used as a finishing school for agents under the command of Major John Hackett and then Major Walte Gallie as part of the SOE and Political Warfare Executive. Agents were trained in various potential roles including parachuting, radio operation and weapons handling, along with propaganda in preparation for deployment in German-occupied Europe, particularly France, Netherlands and Belgium. It also provided a home for Joseph P. Kennedy Sr., the United States ambassador.

After the war, the house became a teacher training college. It was later used as a residence by the University of Hertfordshire until 2003 after which it was re-developed into luxury flats, and the west side of the parkland overlaid with a golf course.

== Architecture ==
The two-storey main house is built of brick with cement render and a slate roof hidden by a crenellated parapet. The front entrance consists of partially glazed double door within a porte-cochère, which was added around 1830. The door leads to an entrance hall with neo-Jacobean panelling. At either end of the front elevation are corner turrets with pinnacles; there are also three-storey turrets. Further turrets are also visible on the front wall; one being square with an octagonal bartizan and the other octagonal.

The site covers around 65 hectares (160 acres) and slopes towards the River Colne. An artificial canal from the river feeds a small lake. The remains of a kitchen garden and orchard can still be seen. A broad leaf woodland with bluebells, known as Berrygrove Woods, covers 44 hectares (110 acres) towards the south of the estate.
