= Skhalta Cathedral =

Georgian Orthodox cathedral and monastery in Adjara, Georgia

Skhalta Cathedral სხალთა
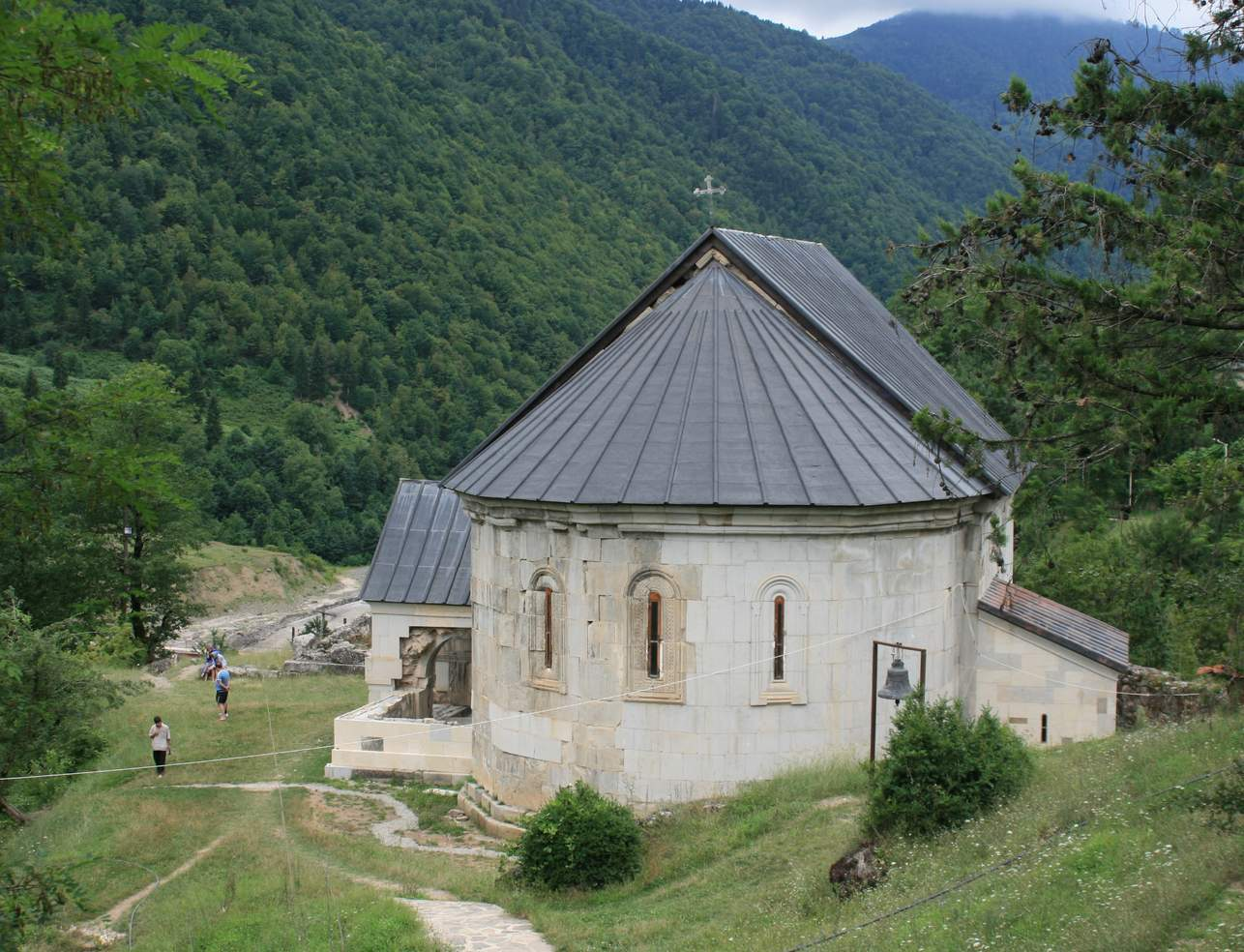
- Skhalta Cathedral

- Location within Adjara Location within Georgia

Religion
- Affiliation: Georgian Orthodox Church
- District: Khulo District
- Region: Caucasus
- Status: Active since 1990

Location
- Location: Q'inchauri, Khulo District, Georgia (Adjara)
- Coordinates: 41.584967°N 42.329708°E

Architecture
- Type: Large hall basilica plan; Monastery
- Style: Georgian
- Funded by: Possibly Queen Tamar of Georgia
- Completed: Mid-13th century

The Skhalta Cathedral (Georgian: სხალთა, [sχɑltʰɑ]) is a Georgian Orthodox monastery and cathedral church in Adjara, Georgia, dating from the mid-13th century. It is a large hall church design, with fragments of the 14th or 15th century Paleologian-style wall painting.

Skhalta is the only medieval church in Adjara that survived both the Ottoman and Soviet periods to become functional again in 1990. It currently serves as a seat of the Georgian Orthodox bishop of Skhalta.

== History ==
The Skhalta monastery is located on a hill in the eponymous river valley, at the village of Q'inchauri, Khulo municipality, along a road, which, in the Middle Ages, strategically linked Adjara with Artani (modern Ardahan, Turkey). The written sources on Skhalta are scarce. A legend attributes the construction of the church to Queen Tamar (r. 1184–1213), who presided over the Golden Age of medieval Georgia. Modern studies date the church to the middle of the 13th century. At that time, the Skhalta valley was in possession of the noble family of Abuserisdze.

After the Ottoman conquest of the region in the 16th century, the church was abandoned. The monastery was rediscovered and sketched by Giorgi Kazbegi, the Georgian officer in the Russian service, who was in Ottoman Georgia on a reconnaissance mission in 1874. After Adjara passed in the Russian hands in 1878, Skhalta—then lying in the estate of the Muslim Georgian chief Sherif-Bey—was visited and described by the students of Caucasian antiquities such as Dimitri Bakradze and Countess Praskovya Uvarova. Bakradze cites a document from the period of King Alexander I of Georgia (r. 1412–1442), according to which Skhalta belonged to the patriarchal see of Mtskheta.

The revival of religious activity and rising influence of the Georgian Orthodox Church in the closing years of the Soviet Union led to the restoration of the Skhalta church to Christian use. In June 1989, Catholicos-Patriarch Ilia II of Georgia paid a visit to Skhalta and held a requiem for those who had died in landslides and floods earlier that year. In 1990, Skhalta was consecrated as a male monastery of the Nativity of Mary.

== Architecture ==
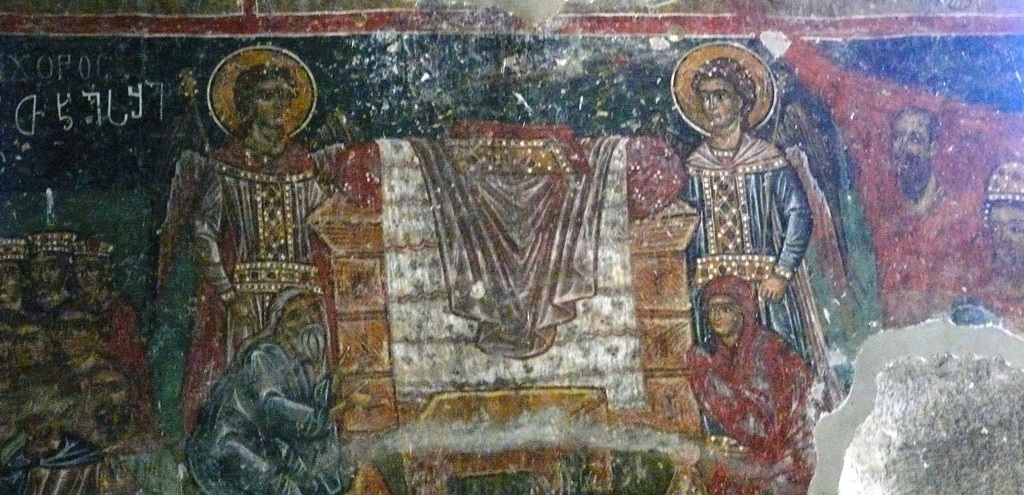
A fresco from Skhalta

The Skhalta monastery is a large hall church, with a protruding, seven-faceted apse, two principal portals on the south and on the west and an additional door on the north. It is built of gray-white stone. A spacious interior hall is crowned with arches and a cylindrical vault, resting on prominent pilasters. The side walls of the hall are decorated with arches. The conch of the apse and the vault are separated from the lower vertical walls with simple cornices.

The interior walls are faced with hewn blocks of white stone, which had formerly been extensively frescoed. Small fragments of the original paintings of the New Testament scenes—exemplifying the Paleologian art of the 14th or 15th century—were uncovered by the Georgian expedition in 1997. The façades are also covered with hewn blocks and the windows are ornated. Some of the ruined structures to the west and south are later additions.
