= Sherip Khimshiashvili =

Georgian nobleman

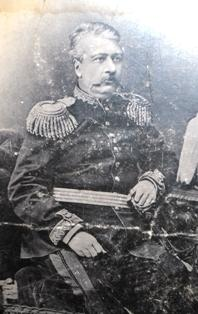
Sherip Khimshiashvili

Şerif Bey, Sherip Khimshiashvili (Georgian: შერიფ ხიმშიაშვილი), or Prince and Duke Sherif (Russian: Шериф-бек Аджарский) (1829 or 7 January 1833 – 1892) was a Georgian nobleman (Beylerbeyi ) of the Khimshiashvili Dynasty from Adjara in the Ottoman service. He defected to the Russian Empire during the Russo-Turkish War (1877–78) and, thereby, was able to retain his property and accede to the rank of a general after the Russian takeover of Adjara.

== Early life and Ottoman service ==
Prince Şerif was born in Khulo to Ahmed Paşa, Prince and an Ottoman general and a semi-autonomous hereditary ruler (beylerbey, "lord of the valleys") of Upper Adjara, At the time of his father's death in 1836, Şerif Bey was still in his minority and his mother administered the family's estates, while his uncle, Kor Hussein Bey, bey of the Penek valley, was regarded as the head of the Khimshiashvili princedom and dukedom. By the time Şerif Bey reached the age of majority, the autonomous rule of derebeys, which Kor Hussein Bey had defended with arms in his hands, had largely been subdued to the central Ottoman government in the tanzimat reforms. Şerif Bey, as a sanjak bey of Upper Adjara (Acara-yı Ülya) served in the Ottoman ranks against the Russians during the Crimean War (1853–56). Through his possessions passed a key road from the Ottoman-held Batum to the Russian-controlled Akhaltsikhe. "Part of this road has, with uncommon skill and diligence, been brought into excellent order, so as to allow the transport even of heavy artillery, by Shereef Beg, the hereditary Mudeer or Governor."—the British consul in Trebizond, Gifford Palgrave, reported in 1868.

== Russian service ==
During the Russo-Turkish War of 1877–78, Şerif Bey refused to serve the Ottoman cause and supported the Russians in their unsuccessful attempt to occupy Batum and Adjara. An Ottoman detachment razed the bey's mansion in Skhalta as he fled to Akhaltsikhe. By the Treaty of Berlin of 1878 Adjara became part of the Russian Empire. In November 1878, Şerif led a delegation of Adjarian notables to meet Georgian writers and public figures in Tiflis on the occasion of reunion of Adjara with the rest of Georgia under the Russian rule. Şerif Bey's services were rewarded by the Russian government by granting security to his land holdings and the rank of major-general to which Şerif Bey, now known as Sherif-Beg Adzharsky, was promoted in February 1879. He was enlisted with the Caucasian Military District from 1879 to May 1891. In 1883, he converted to Orthodox Christianity and was baptized as Aleksandr Aleksandrovich Adzharsky.

Sherif-Beg had 17 children. Two of his sons, Jemal-Beg (died 1924) and Temur-Beg (1860–1921) had military and political careers in Georgia and Turkey. Sherif-Beg died in St. Petersburg and was buried at his summer mansion in Mtisubani near Khikhani in Adjara. Khimshiashvili's former house in Skhalta, built in 1873, now houses his memorial museum.
