= Giorgi Khimshiashvili =

Georgian military officer (1892–1923)

- გიორგი ხიმშიაშვილი
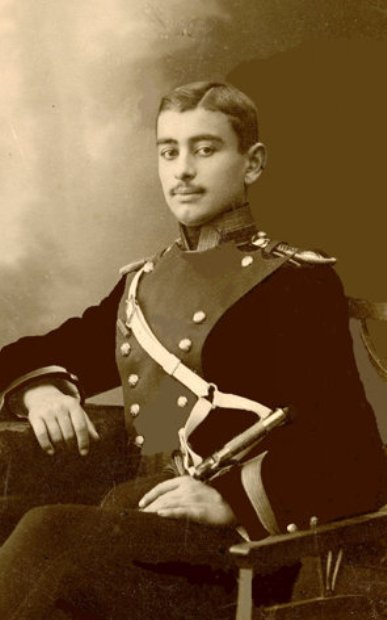
- Born: 1892
- Died: 20 May 1923 (aged 31); Tbilisi
- Military career
- Allegiance: Russian Empire; Democratic Republic of Georgia; Soviet Union
- Branch: Cavalry
- Rank: Colonel
- Nickname: Gogi
- Conflicts: World War I Sochi conflict Armeno-Georgian War; Red Army invasion of Georgia

Giorgi "Gogi" Khimshiashvili (Georgian: გოგი ხიმშიაშვილი; 1892 – 20 May 1923) was a Georgian military officer prominent in the service of the Democratic Republic of Georgia (1918–1921). He was executed by the Soviet authorities on charges of being part of an underground anti-Soviet organization.

Giorgi Khimshiashvili was born in the noble family from the eastern Georgian region of Kakheti, then part of the Russian Empire. His father, Prince Nikoloz Khimshiashvili (Khimshiyev) was assassinated in 1910, as police concluded, for helping the authorities to reveal the murderers of Prince Ilia Chavchavadze, a leading Georgian writer and intellectual. Giorgi Khimshiashvili was educated at the Nicholas Cavalry College in St. Petersburg and fought in the Russian ranks as cornet in World War I. He took part in the Caucasus and Persian campaigns.

In 1918, when Georgia became an independent republic, Khimshiashvili was appointed as a commander of the cavalry in the People's Guard of Georgia with the rank of colonel (polkovnik). In this capacity, he was one of the leading officers during the conflicts with Armenia (1918), Russian "White Forces" (1919), and Soviet Azerbaijan (1920). In July 1920, he was among the Georgian officers who oversaw the transfer of sovereignty over Batum from the British occupation forces to Georgia.

During the war with Soviet Russia in February 1921, Khimshiashvili was unexpectedly dismissed from command. After the sovietization of Georgia, he remained in Georgia and was given the position of commander of training battalion in a cavalry brigade of the Georgian Red Army. In 1922, he joined the underground anti-Soviet organization, the Committee for the Independence of Georgia, and was a member of its "military centre", representing a Social Democratic party. In May 1923, the centre's leadership, including Khimshiashvili, were arrested and sentenced to death. On his way to execution, Khimshiashvili attempted to escape, but was wounded, captured, and shot together with his accomplices in what is now Vake Park in central Tbilisi. In 2023, he was posthumously awarded the title and Order of National Hero of Georgia.

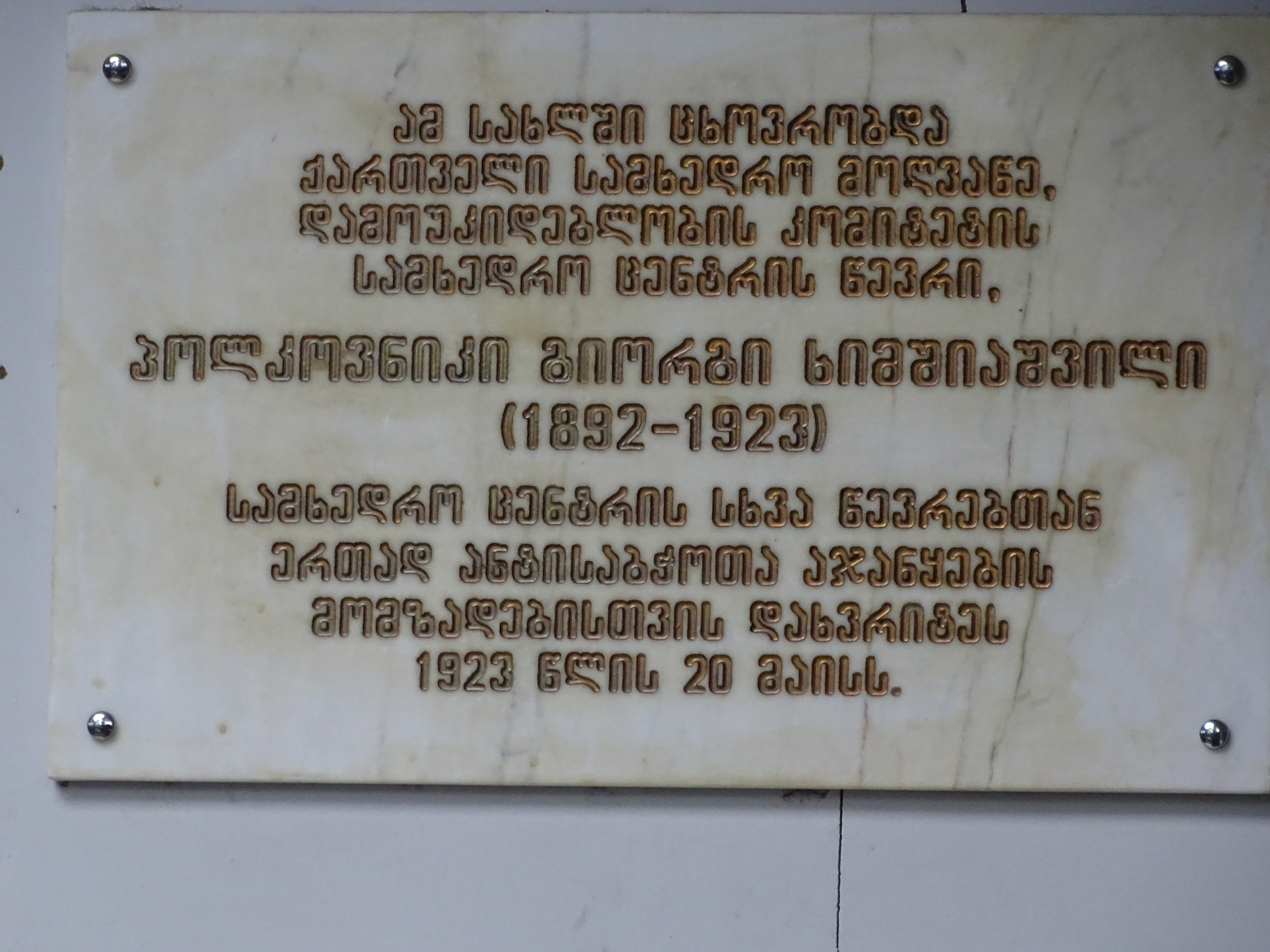
Memorial plaque of Giorgi Khimshiashvili in Tbilisi, Georgia
