= Action of 16 March 1782 =

- Part of the American War of Independence
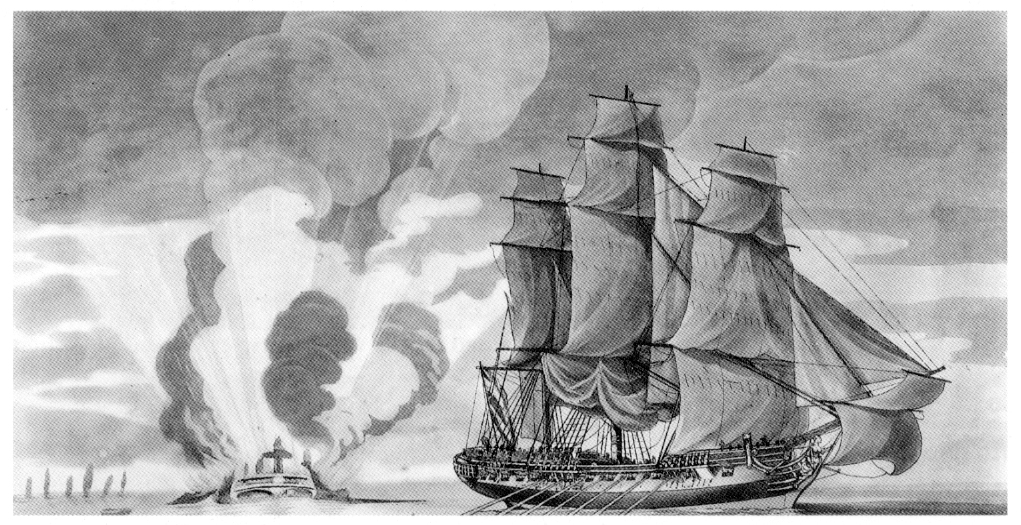
- Engagement between HMS Success and the Santa Catalina
Date	16 March 1782
Location	off Strait of Gibraltar 35°52′N 5°58′W
Result	British victory

Belligerents
Spain	Great Britain

Commanders and leaders
(Spain) Don Miguel Tacón (POW)	(Kingdom of Great Britain) Captain Sir Charles Pole

Strength
1 frigate Santa Catalina	1 frigate HMS Success; 1 hired armed storeship Vernon

Casualties and losses
1 frigate destroyed 25 killed 8 wounded 260 surrendered	1 killed 4 wounded

The action of 16 March 1782 was a naval engagement between a British Royal Naval frigate HMS Success and a Spanish frigate Santa Catalina in the Strait of Gibraltar during the American War of Independence.

On 16 March 1782 the 32-gun frigate Success under the command of Captain Charles Pole, and the Hired armed store-ship Vernon (mounting 22 long six-pounders) commanded by John Falconer were off Cape Spartel, Morocco, on their voyage to Gibraltar. They sighted the Spanish 12-pounder 34-gun frigate Santa Catalina commanded by Don Miguel Tacón. This ship was part of a squadron keeping lookout for any relief convoys heading into Gibraltar, which was then under siege.

When the Spanish frigate approached within random shot, the Success suddenly hauled up and poured a destructive broadside. The Success then wore round and took up her position, which was also mimicked by the Vernon. The Santa Catalina, having lost her mizzenmast at around 8:00 pm, hauled down her colours, and then was taken possession of by the Success.

Out of 300 men, the Santa Catalina had 25 killed and eight wounded, and the Success one killed and four wounded. The Santa Catalina was, however, severely damaged and had been holed below the waterline. The next day, six Spanish sail were sighted. Pole, fearing the Spaniards had formed a plan to take possession of the Success and the Santa Catalina, decided that once all the valuables and prisoners had been removed, it was necessary to destroy her. The Santa Catalina was accordingly set on fire and blown up. Pole then headed back to Gibraltar, which he made successfully a few days later.
