= Khulo =

Khulo ხულო
- Townlet
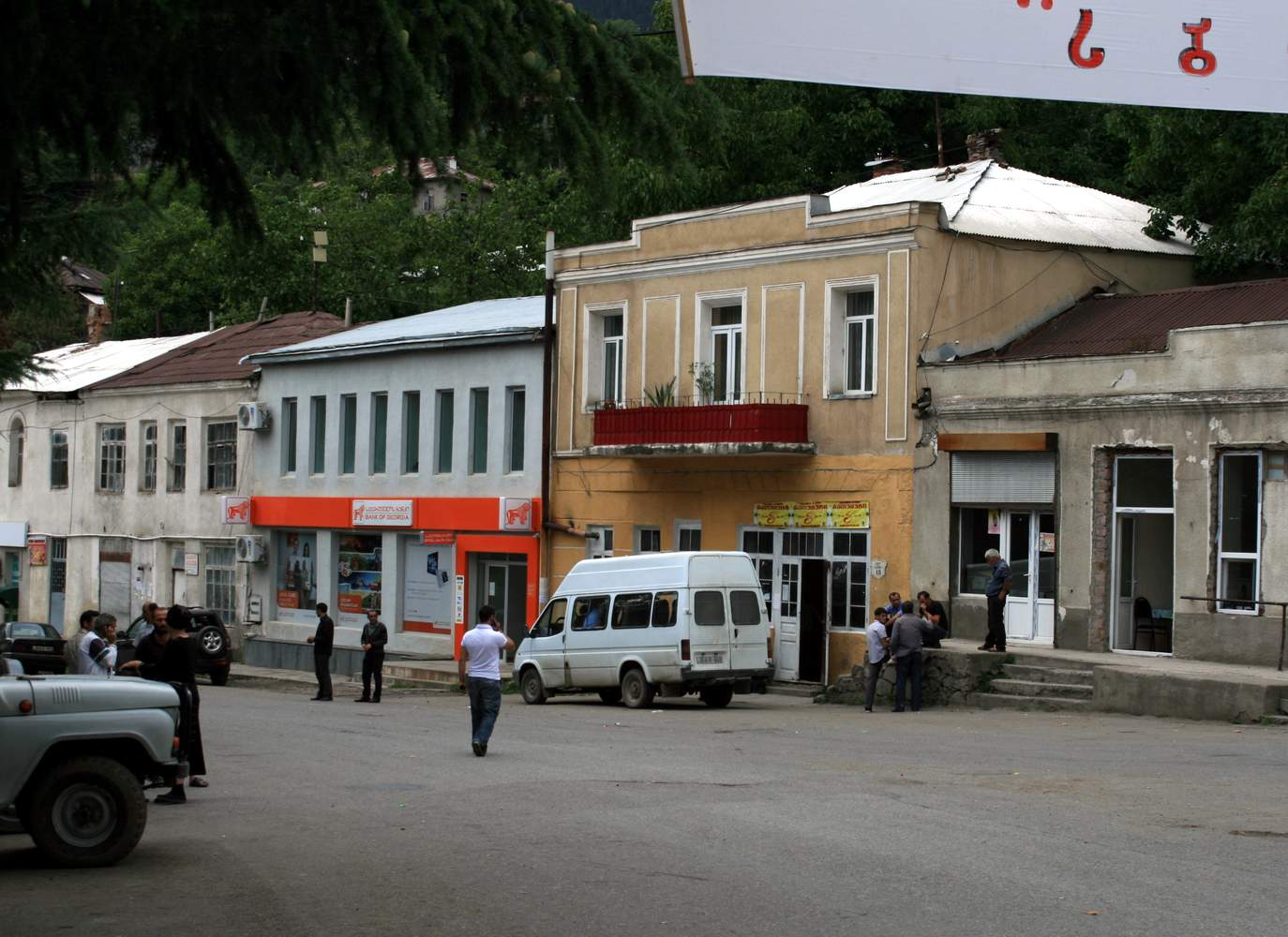

- Location within Georgia Location within Adjara
- Coordinates: 41°38′40″N 42°18′50″E
- Country: Georgia
- Autonomous Republic: Adjara
- District: Khulo
- Daba from: 1964

Population (2014)
  - Total: 1,007
- Time zone: UTC+4 (Georgian Time)

Khulo (Georgian: ხულო [χulo]) is a townlet (daba) in Adjara, an autonomous republic in southwest Georgia, 88 km east of the regional capital Batumi, in the upper valley of the Adjaristsqali River. The town and adjoining 78 villages form the mountainous Khulo District (Raion), which has an area of 710 km^{2} and a population of 23,327. It is inhabited by Adjarians, an ethnic subgroup of Georgians.

The town, formerly known as Khula and Hulo, was a merchant place located on a medieval road that linked the neighboring region of Samtskhe-Javakheti to the Black Sea coast. The Khulo area has been inhabited since ancient times, almost from the Bronze Age. Cult monuments include the Thilvani Menhir, a simple megalith building/vertical column about 20 meters tall that archaeologists think was connected to a funeral ritual. Another monument, the Kaloto Altar was found in Khulo, confirming the existence of civilization in the Khulo region in pre-Christian times. The site was built up in the Middle Ages, as evidenced by the many surviving churches, castles, and medieval arched bridges.

== History ==
In the 16th century, the Ottoman Empire pursued an active policy of conquest in several regions of the world, including in what is now Georgia. Georgian lands became one of the directions of Ottoman expansion on the eastern coast of the Black Sea. However, the scattered parts of the former Georgian kingdom found themselves in the orbit of the Ottoman Empire's influence at different times, and the forms of their relations with the Ottoman state were also different. Along with the entire region of Adjara, Khulo was part of the Ottoman Empire. During this period, Adjara experienced a process of Islamization and most residents of the region converted to Islam.

During Ottoman rule, Khulo was a chief settlement of Upper Adjara governed by the Khimshiashvili family. In 1829, it was briefly occupied by the Russian force of General Osten-Sacken who sacked the Khimshiashvili residence before withdrawal. Khulo's population, largely Islamized during the Ottoman era, diminished dramatically under the Russian oppression of Islam in the 1870s. A series of floods and avalanches in the 1990s-2000s induced another wave of migration from the mountainous villages of the municipality.

In April 1929, during Soviet rule, the Muslim villagers of mountainous Adjara rose in arms against compulsory collectivization and religious persecution. The Soviet troops were invoked and the revolt was quickly put down. Thousands of Adjarians were deported from the republic.

The Khulo district was established in 1965 by its current borders, and, according to the current administrative-territorial arrangement, it is called Khulo municipality.

== Notable landmarks ==
In the district are medieval historical monuments such as Khikhani Fortress where rebel against Ottoman Empire Selim Beg Khimshiashvili defended himself until he was captured and beheaded by Ottoman forces in 1785. The exact date of building Khikhani Fortress is unknown, but most scholars think it was built in sometime in the 10th-13th centuries. Khikhani Fortress was one of the most important fortresses in Adjara. The castle is strategically located in a very convenient location, as it has one pedestrian access from the south-eastern side. It used to be a shelter for the local lords. On the way to Khikhani Fortress there is an active monastery at Skhalta cathedral, built in the 13th century.

== See also ==
- Adjara
