= Pole baronets =

Set index for Pole baronets

There have been three baronetcies created for persons with the surname Pole, one in the Baronetage of England, one in the Baronetage of Great Britain and one in the Baronetage of the United Kingdom. Two of the creations are extant as of 2008.

- Pole baronets of Shute House (1628)
- Pole baronets of Wolverton (1791)
- Pole baronets of the Navy (1801): see Sir Charles Pole, 1st Baronet (1757–1830)
