= Poisson Volant =

Poisson Volant (Flying Fish), was a popular name for French vessels, including naval vessels and privateers. Between 1760 and 1814, warships of the Royal Navy captured numerous privateers named Poisson Volant.

- In April 1760 the frigate HMS Levant was on patrol in the Caribbean and captured an 8-gun French privateer named Poisson Volante. The captured vessel and her crew were delivered to British authorities in the Leeward Islands.
- The French privateer Poisson Volant was sunk by the cutter Speedwell, captained by Captain Wesson, in a battle off Portland on December 10, 1782. Weymouth is where he landed her crew. Poisson Volant was three days out of Dunkirk and had taken nothing. This Speedwell was probably a revenue cutter, and not HMS Speedwell; HMS Speedwell was at Gibraltar and under the command of Lieutenant Gibson.
- In June 1795, HMS Weazle and HMS Phaeton captured the 10-gun Poisson Volante in the Channel.
- On 30 September 1795, HMS Success captured the brig Poisson Volant on the Jamaica station.
- On 4 May 1796 HMS Esperance was sailing in company with HMS Spencer and HMS Bonetta when they sighted a suspicious vessel. Spencer set off in chase while shortly thereafter Esperance saw two vessels, a schooner and a sloop, and she and Bonetta set off after them. Spencer sailed south-southeast and the other two British vessels sailed southwest by west, with the result that they lost sight of each other. Spencer captured the French gun-brig Volcan, while Bonetta and Esperance captured the schooner Poisson Volant. Poisson Volant was sailing from Aux Cayes to New York and turned out to be the former HMS Flying Fish that two French privateers had captured in June 1795 while she was on her way to Jamaica. Flying Fish's crew had cut down her gunwales and thrown some of her guns overboard, presumably during the chase. At the time of the recapture Poisson Volant had some eight or ten days earlier met with the French ship Concorde. Poisson Volant was under the command of a sub-lieutenant from Concorde and had a crew of 38 men.
- In early 1797, HMS Magicienne captured two privateers named Poisson Volant. One was armed with 12 guns and had a crew of 80 men, and the other was armed with five guns and had a crew of 50 men. One was captured on 13 January, and the other on 16 February. A later account narrates that Poisson Volant was a Dutch privateer, out of Curacao, and that Magicienne sent her into Jamaica to be condemned as a prize.
- On 4 April 1797, HMS Tamar was escorting a convoy from Barbados to Martinique when she encountered the French privateer Poisson Volant, of Guadeloupe. Poisson Volant was armed with four guns and had a crew of 40 men. Tamer brought her into Martinique. Sir Thomas Byam Martin was captain of Tamar and in his biography reports that earlier that year Tamar had captured the same vessel and sent her into Antigua, where she had been condemned as prize, sold and sailed to a neutral island. There a company of speculators had bought her and taken her to Guadeloupe to be commissioned as a privateer.
- On 5 June 1797, the revenue cutter Lively captured the small (12 tons burthen) Poisson Volant, of Nantes, armed with two swivel guns and having a crew of 25 men. Poisson Volant was three days out of Morlaix and Lively captured her between Shoreham and the Isle of Wight. Mr. Dubois Smith of the customs service reported that Poisson Volant had not taken any prizes.
- On 27 June 1797, HMS Trent was 10 leagues east of Yarmouth when she captured the French privateer lugger Poisson Volant. Poisson Volant was armed with 14 guns that she threw overboard during the chase. She had a crew of 50 men, but 28 were away in a brig and a ship that she had taken as prizes off "Buckiness" a few days earlier. Poisson Volant was quite new and had left Havre de Grace, France, some 18 days earlier.
- On 24 July 1797 HMS Concorde captured the 4-gun letter of marque Poisson Volant, Captain Latarte, off Cape Finisterre. She was bound from Bordeaux to Guadeloupe carrying wines and merchandise. Latarte's intent was to deliver his cargo after which he intended to cruise as a privateer in the West Indies. Captain Roberts of Concorde was of the opinion that Poisson Volant might well have done "considerable mischief" as she was faster in light winds than Concorde, which had only captured her because she was under the reach of Concorde's guns when first seen.
- On 9 April 1801, His Majesty's Hired armed cutter Stag was 10 or 11 leagues south of Beachy Head when she sighted a lugger and a brig. She gave chase and after an hour and a half, captured both. The lugger was the French privateer Poisson Volant, of Boulogne. She was armed with 14 guns and had a crew of 55 men under the command of Citizen Jacque Antoine Hedd. He was four days out of Dieppe and had captured only the brig. On her previous cruise Poisson Volant had captured six vessels, four of which British vessels had recaptured. Before surrendering, Poisson Volant lost two men killed and four wounded.
- In mid-1803, a squadron under Captain Henry William Bayntun, consisting of Cumberland, Hercule, Bellerophon, Elephant, and Vanguard captured Poisson Volant, an American-built French privateer schooner of 12-guns. The British commissioned her as HMS Flying Fish.
