= HMS Success (1781) =

Frigate of the Royal Navy

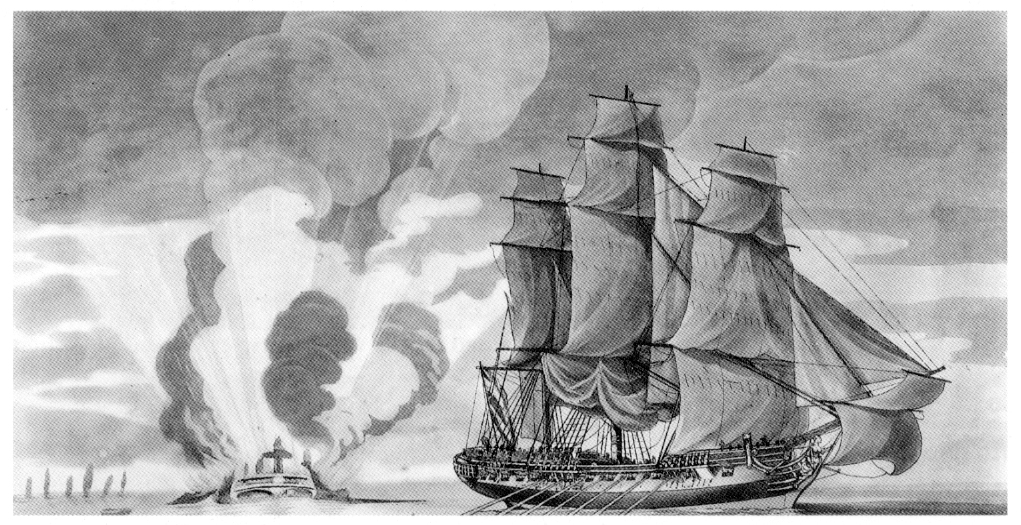
- Success destroys Santa Catalina, 16 March 1782

History

Great Britain
- Name: HMS Success
- Ordered: 22 February 1779
- Builder: John Sutton, Liverpool
- Laid down: 8 May 1779
- Launched: 10 April 1781
- Commissioned: 1781
- Honours and awards: Naval General Service Medal with clasp: "9 June 1799"
- Fate: Captured by the French Navy on 10 February 1801

France
- Name: Succès
- Acquired: 10 February 1801 by capture
- Fate: Re-captured by the Royal Navy on 2 September 1801

United Kingdom
- Name: HMS Success
- Acquired: 2 September 1801 by capture
- Fate: Broken up, 1820

General characteristics
- Class & type: 32-gun Amazon-class fifth-rate frigate
- Tons burthen: 6824/94 (bm)
- Length: 126 ft (38.4 m) (overall); 103 ft 8 in (31.6 m) (keel)
- Beam: 35 ft 1 1/2 in (10.7 m)
- Depth of hold: 12 ft 2 in (3.71 m)
- Propulsion: Sails
- Sail plan: Full-rigged ship
- Complement: 220
- Armament: UD: 26 × 12-pounder guns; QD: 4 × 6-pounder guns + 4 × 18-pounder carronades; Fc: 2 × 6-pounder guns + 2 × 18-pounder carronades

HMS Success was a 32-gun Amazon-class fifth-rate frigate of the British Royal Navy launched in 1781, which served during the American Revolutionary, French Revolutionary and Napoleonic Wars. The French captured her in the Mediterranean on 13 February 1801, but she was recaptured by the British on 2 September. She continued to serve in the Mediterranean until 1811, and in North America until hulked in 1814, then serving as a prison ship and powder hulk, before being broken up in 1820.

== Ship history ==
Ship plan of the Success

The ship, based on a design by Sir John Williams, Surveyor of the Navy, was ordered by the Admiralty on 22 February 1779, and built at Liverpool by John Sutton, being laid down on 8 May 1779, and launched 10 April 1781.

=== Service in the American War ===
Success was commissioned in March 1781 under the command of Captain Charles Morice Pole, to serve in the American Revolutionary War, where she made several captures. The first, on 12 August 1781, was in company with Daphne, when they took the Spanish merchant ship St. Sebastian. Then, on 2 October, Success, Daphne, and the cutter Cruizer, captured the French privateer Eclair. The following year, in the action of 16 March 1782, while escorting the storeship Vernon to Gibraltar, Success fought, captured, and burned the 34-gun Spanish frigate Santa Catalina off Cape Spartel. On 20 June 1782 she sailed with a convoy for Jamaica, and on 3 October 1782 Success and the cutter Pigmy captured the ship Vrouw Margaretha. Success was paid off in November 1783, following the end of the war.

=== Service in the wars against France ===
She remained in ordinary until November 1790 when a "great repair" began at Gravesend, which was not completed until December 1792, at a cost of £15,938, just in time for the beginning of the French Revolutionary Wars. She then began fitting out at Chatham Dockyard, where she was recommissioned in February 1793 under the command of Captain Francis Roberts, and was ready for sea by April.

On 25 August she sailed for the Caribbean, where Roberts died the following year, and on 1 September 1794 the notorious Captain Hugh Pigot was appointed to command her.

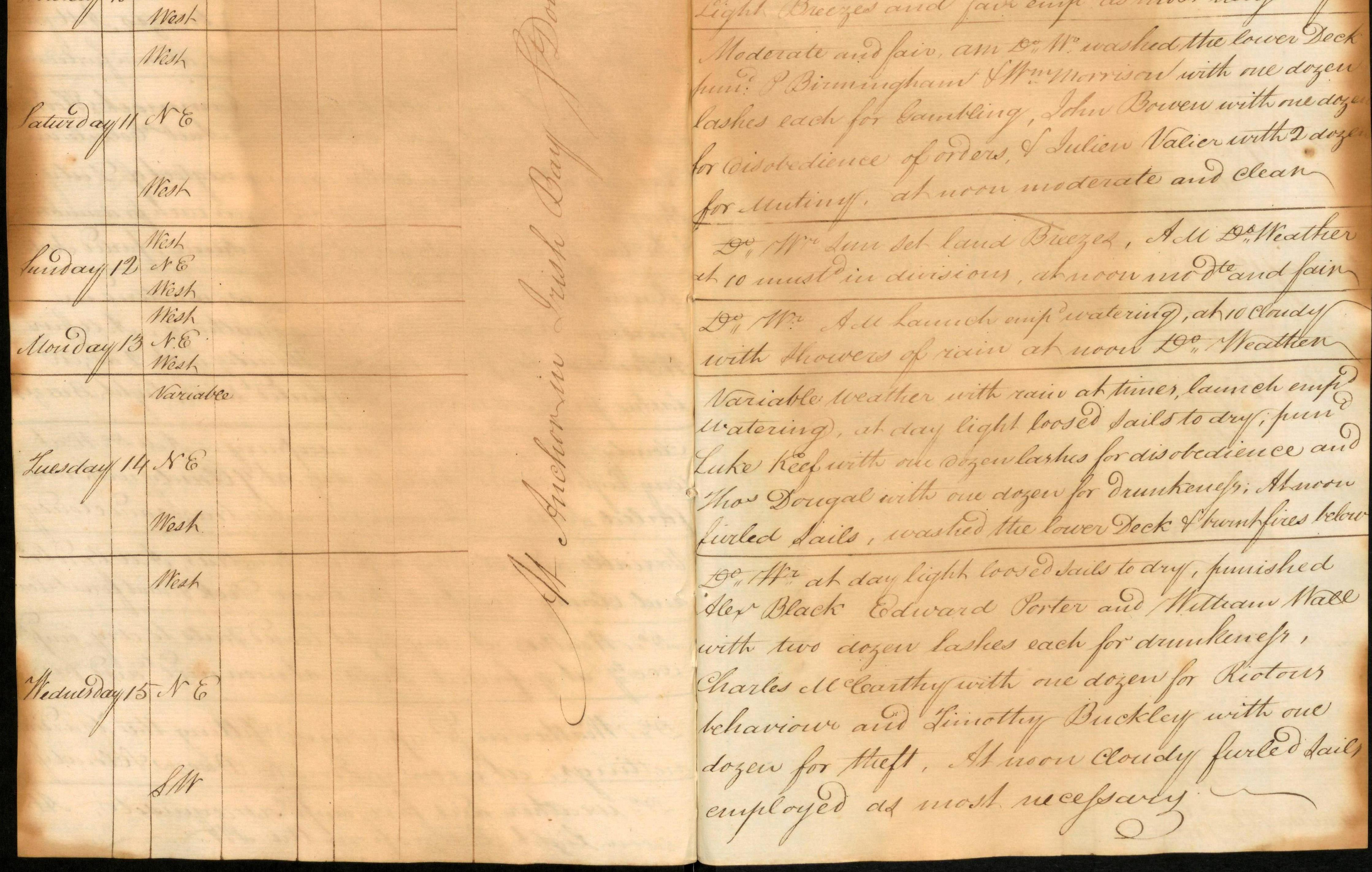
HMS SUCCESS LOG, 11 APR TO 15 APR 1795 punishments, ordered by captain Hugh Pigot

She captured the French brig Poisson Volant on 30 September 1795. During captain Pigot's tenure, HMS Success was routinely tasked with safely convoying merchant vessels. During this nine month period, Pigot ordered at least 85 floggings, the equivalent of half the crew;subsequently two of these men died from their injuries. Author Dudley Pope has pointed out, that beyond the frequency of flogging, was Captain Pigot's "complete lack of balance". He noted for example, in April 1795 a seaman on HMS Success, was given twenty four lashes, for mutiny, one of the worst offenses in the Royal Navy, apart from murder or treason, yet three sailors in the same month, were given twenty four lashes for drunkenness, one of the most common infractions. Like many vessels in the Royal Navy, HMS Success became increasingly dependent on "pressed men" or forcible recruitment. For example, the ship log for August 1795 noted on 28 August "impressed 19 men" and again on 29 August 1795 "Boats employed on impress service - impressed 27 men."

On 1 July 1796 while guarding a convoy, the Success collided with American brig Mercury. Captain Pigot became angered over what he considered the negligence of the American vessel, and its captain William Jessup. When Jessup claimed HMS Success was at fault, Pigot became outraged and had his boatswain mate strip Jessup to the waist and flog the American. This hasty action quickly led to an international incident. Although captain Pigot was cleared by a court of inquiry of any wrongdoing, the Admiralty to mollify American opinion, decided to exchange captain Pigot, with the commanding officer of HMS Hermione captain Phillip Wilkinson.

From February 1797 the Success was commanded by captain Wilkinson, first serving in the English Channel and in the blockade of Cádiz. She recaptured the brig Providence on 24 September 1797 and shared with Indefatigable and Cambrian in the capture on 16 January 1798 of the 8-gun French privateer Inconceivable. On 2 June 1798 she sailed for North America, being part of the squadron that captured the Yonge Sybrandt on 12 June 1798.

In May 1799 Captain Shuldham Peard took command of Success, and was sent to serve in the Mediterranean. On 9 June of that year, Success was off Cap de Creus, when Peard spotted a polacca to the north-west. He gave chase, but the vessel took refuge in the harbour of El Port de la Selva, so he sent in his boats to cut her out. After a fierce action, in which Success suffered three killed and nine badly wounded, she proved to be the Bella Aurora, sailing from Genoa to Barcelona with a cargo of cotton, silk and rice, and armed with 10 guns, all 9- or 6-pounders. In his report Peard pointed out that the attack had been carried out in broad daylight by only 43 men against a vessel crewed by 113, protected by boarding netting, and supported from the shore by a small gun battery and a large number of men with muskets. Subsequently, in 1847, a clasp to the Naval General Service Medal marked "9 June 1799" awarded to any surviving members of the action who applied for it. Shortly after, Success was one of the fleet, part of which fought the action of 18 June 1799, in which three French frigates and two brigs were captured.

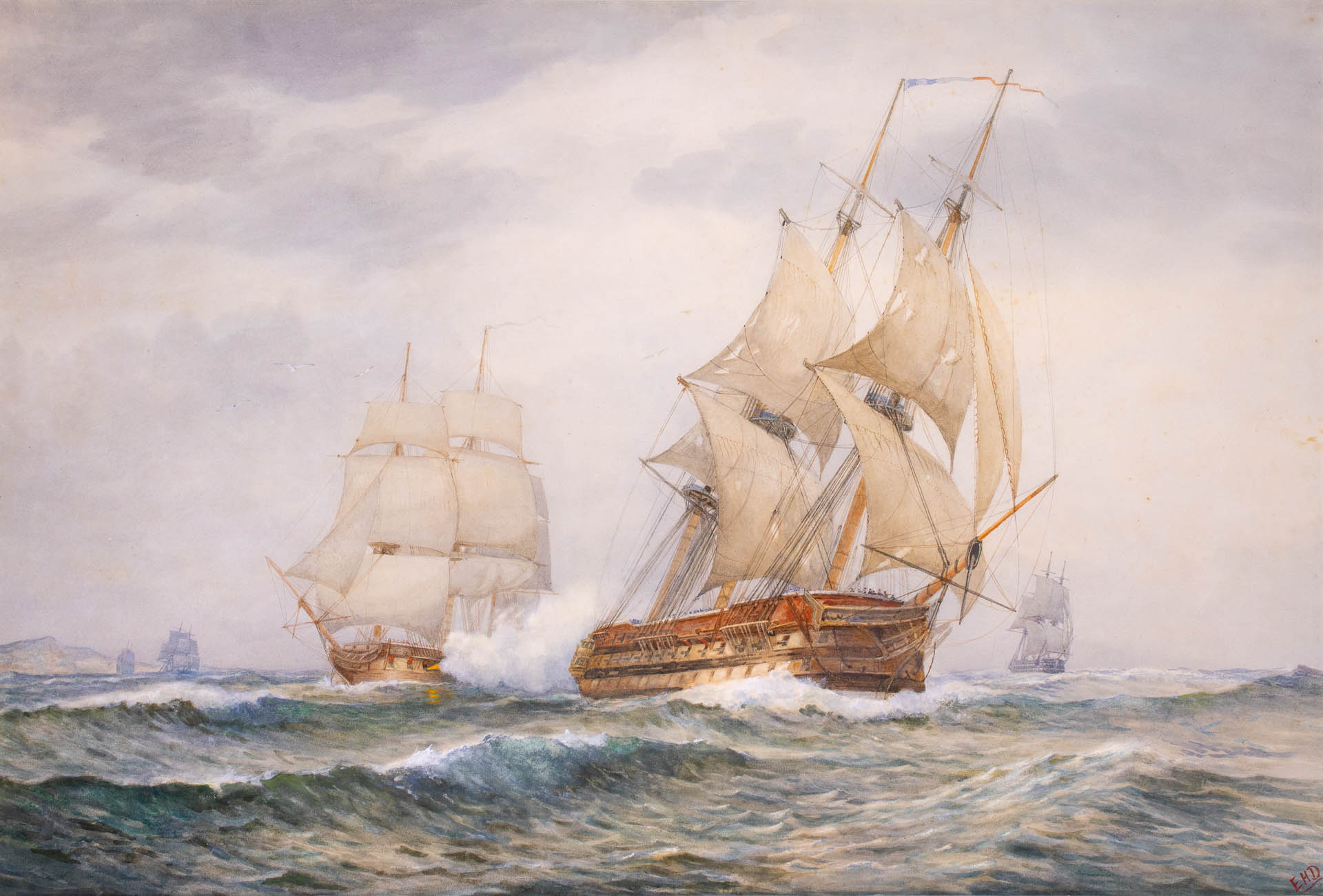
Battle of the Malta Convoy, HMS Success attacks Généreux on 18 February 1800

Success was then employed on the blockade of Malta, during which, on 18 February 1800, she played a crucial role in the capture of the French 74 Généreux, flagship of Rear-Admiral Perrée, Commander-in-Chief of the French naval forces in the Mediterranean, by raking her several times, before she was captured by the ships of the line Foudroyant and Northumberland. Success made several subsequent captures during the siege. On 28 April 1800 she took the French polacca La Bellone, from Valletta bound for Marseille, laden with cotton. On 25 June she captured the French aviso Entreprenant (or Intraprenant), under the command of Enseigne Louis Podesta, with four guns and a crew of 36 men, carrying provisions from Santa Messa to Valletta. The next day Success captured another aviso, Redoutable, under Enseigne Jean Pierre Louis Barallier, with the same armament, establishment, and mission as Entreprenant. Unfortunately for Success, she had to share the prize money with a large number of other British warships. The same day she captured the French felucca Fortune, which was apparently unarmed, but carrying provisions on the same route as the two avisos. During the night of 24 August, two French frigates, Justice and Diane, sailed from Valletta harbour, in an attempt to evade the British blockade. However they were seen and pursued, and after chase of several hours, and a running fight with Success, the Diane surrendered to her, Généreux and Northumberland. She mounted 42 guns, 18- and 9-pounders, but had a crew of only 114, having left the rest onshore as part of the garrison. Justice, however, escaped under cover of darkness. Finally, on 5 February 1801 she captured the Spanish felucca La Virgen del Rosario.

=== Capture and service in the French Navy ===
On 9 February 1801, while in the Bay of Gibraltar, Peard observed seven French ships of the line and two frigates, entering the Mediterranean, which he correctly assumed were bound for Egypt to relieve the French army there. Peard set sail in pursuit, intending to overtake them and find Lord Keith, the naval commander-in-chief, to inform him of their location. He caught up with the French squadron off Cape de Gata, and sailed past them during the night. For the next two days the French remained in sight at a distance. A fresh breeze sprang up during the night of the 12th, and Peard attempted to outdistance them, but discovered the French close by the next morning. They gave chase, and Peard set a course west hoping to encounter pursuing British ships. However at noon the wind fell, and the two French frigates crept closer. At 3 p.m. the French opened fire, and Peard, realising that his situation was hopeless, surrendered. When interrogated, Peard falsely claimed that British forces had landed on the coast of Egypt (which did not occur until 8 March), and that Rear-Admiral Sir John Borlase Warren, with a powerful squadron, was close by and in pursuit. Ganteaume changed course, and his squadron arrived at Toulon six days later, where Peard and his officers were promptly exchanged, arriving at Port Mahon by cartel on 26 February.

Success was subsequently commissioned into the French Navy as Succès. In July, under the command of Capitaine de frégate Jacques-François-Ignace Bretel, she sailed with the frigates Bravoure and Carrère from Toulon to Elba. On the voyage back, Carrère was captured on 3 August, while Bravoure and Succès escaped.

In September 1801, the British frigate Minerve was stationed off Elba. Early on 2 September she alerted Phoenix, which was anchored off Piombino, to the presence of two French frigates nearby. Phoenix and Minerve set out in pursuit and Pomone soon came up and joined them. Pomone re-captured Success while Minerve ran the 46-gun French frigate Bravoure onshore, with her crew of 283 men under the command of Monsieur Dordelin. Bravoure lost her masts and was totally wrecked; she struck without a shot being fired. Minerve took off a number of prisoners, including Dordelin and his officers, in her boats. With enemy fire from the shore and with night coming on, Captain Cockburn of Minerve decided to halt the evacuation of prisoners; he therefore was unwilling to set Bravoure on fire because some of her crew remained on board. Bretel was court-martialed for the loss of his ship, and acquitted on 10 December 1801.

=== Return to British service ===
By December 1801 Success was back in commission, under the command of Captain George Burlton, but was paid off following the signing of the peace treaty between Britain and France in March 1802. The peace did not last long, with Britain declaring war on France in May 1803. Success, following a refit at Portsmouth Dockyard, was recommissioned in August 1804 under the command of Captain George Scott, formerly of Stately, who commanded her until 13 March 1806, while stationed in the Caribbean.

On 18 April 1806, Captain John Ayscough assumed command of Success. Early on 20 November 1806, while just east of Guantánamo Bay (known as Cumberland Harbour to the British), Ayscough observed a felucca running into Hidden Port. He sent the ship's barge and yawl in pursuit, but on reaching the shore they discovered that about 50 armed men had landed from the felucca, which was lashed to a tree, and had taken a position at the top of a small hill overlooking the beach, upon which they had mounted a single long gun. They fired grape and ball down on the British, killing the First Lieutenant, Mr. Duke, with their first volley. The British withstood the enemy fire for an hour and twenty minutes, suffering seven more men wounded, and having the barge shot through in several places before Lieutenant Spence, then in command, deemed any attempt on the hill a useless sacrifice, so ordered the enemy ship to be towed out, which was achieved under heavy fire. She proved to be the French privateer Vengeur, which had sailed from Santo Domingo on 1 October, but being badly damaged she sank while under tow.

Success returned to England, escorting a convoy, at the end of the year, and was for several months employed in the blockade of Le Havre. On 21 October 1807 Success, Resistance and the cutter Sprightly, captured the French sloop Adelaide. Sir Samuel Hood then requested Success join his squadron in an expedition to Madeira in December 1807, where troops under Major-General William Beresford landed without opposition on 24 December, and after two days the Portuguese authorities capitulated. After returning to England with Hood's despatches, Success and the 48-gun frigate Loire, under Captain Alexander Wilmot Schomberg, were sent to patrol the seas around Greenland on fishery protection duties, venturing north of Svalbard, and reaching as far as 77° 30' North. In mid-1808 she embarked the Turkish Ambassador and his suite, together with the Earl of Roden, and sailed to the Mediterranean, escorting a convoy of merchantmen.

In March 1809 she sailed from Malta to Portsmouth carrying two Austrian messengers with dispatches, making the voyage in 23 days. She then returned to the Mediterranean in April with a convoy.

In early June 1809 Success took part in a joint expedition against Murat in Naples, from Sicily, led by Lieutenant-General John Stuart, with Rear Admiral George Martin commanding the naval forces. This operation was mounted to relieve the hard-pressed Austrians during the War of the Fifth Coalition, by capturing the islands of Ischia and Procida in the Gulf of Naples. The expedition sailed from Milazzo on 11 June, with a detachment under Lieutenant-Colonel Smith successfully attacking enemy positions in the Strait of Messina. On 25 June British troops, commanded by Major-General Robert Henry MacFarlane, landed on the island of Ischia supported by cannon fire from Warrior and Success, and British and Sicilian gun-boats. Captain Ayscough landed with the troops, but finding little to do on shore returned to his ship where he engaged the enemy's batteries, and succeeded in destroying several gun-boats. The British captured several coastal batteries and about 300 men, but the main body of the enemy under General Colonna, held out in the Castello Aragonese until 30 June before eventually surrendering. In total 1,500 men were taken prisoner, and almost 100 guns and their stores were captured. On 26 June 1809 gunboats under Ayscough's direction assisted Cyane in the capture and destruction of 18 armed gun-boats which were attempting to reach Naples from Gaeta.

On 30 July 1809 she captured two French privateers off the island of Kythira, one mounting nine carriage-guns and four swivels and a crew of 78, the other one gun and 20 men. In November 1809 Success conveyed the Turkish Ambassador and his suite from Smyrna to Malta.

On 4 April 1810, while off Falerna, Ayscough observed two 100-ton settees being loaded on the beach. He immediately sent the ship's boats under the command of Lieutenant George Sartorius, accompanied by the boats of Espoir, under the command of Lieutenant Robert Oliver. Unfortunately three of the boats were swamped close to shore when they struck a hidden reef, and two men from Espoir were lost. The rest of the men swam ashore, but their powder now being wet, were only armed with cutlasses. The British came under fire from two long 6-pounders concealed behind some rocks, but nevertheless drove off the enemy, spiked the guns and set the ships on fire, before righting their boats and returning to the ships for the loss of only two men killed. Later, on 20 April, two sloops were captured and scuttled off Ischia.

On 25 April 1810, Success in company with the frigate Spartan, Captain Jahleel Brenton, and the brig-sloop Espoir, Commander Robert Mitford, observed a ship, three barks, and several feluccas at anchor under the castle of Terracina. The boats of the squadron were sent in under the Lieutenants William Augustus Baumgardt of Spartan and George Sartorius of Success, who, supported by the fire from the ships, and in spite of spirited resistance, brought out the ship and the barks, with a loss of only one man killed and two wounded.

On 1 May 1810, Success and Spartan pursued a French squadron, consisting of the 42-gun frigate Ceres, 28-gun corvette Fame, 8-gun brig Sparviere and the 10-gun cutter Achilles. The French managed to take shelter in the harbour of Naples, and Captain Brenton of Spartan, realising they would never come out while the two British ships were there, ordered Success to a point south-west of Capri. At dawn on 3 May Brenton observed the French coming out, accompanied by eight Neapolitan gun-boats, and in a hard-fought action succeeded in boarding and capturing the brig Sparviere, and causing severe damage to the other ships. Success was unable to play any part in the action being becalmed offshore. On 26 June Success and Scout, captured another ship, the Fortune.

Ayscough, with two other frigates and several sloops under his command, was then assigned to patrol the Strait of Messina, to protect Sicily against a threatened invasion by Murat, who had concentrated about 40,000 troops and 200 gun-boats. Murat launched his attack early on 18 September, with troops sailing from Scilla and Reggio, landing on the Punta del Faro, and at Mili Marina, south of Messina. However British troops reacted swiftly, and neutralized the attempted incursion with little loss to themselves, taking most of the enemy prisoner. Ayscough was next employed, with seven vessels under his command, reconnoitring the coast between Naples and Civita Vecchia, near Rome, but Success was seriously damaged during a severe gale while off Crete, and was obliged to return to England in mid-1811 for repairs.

=== Return to American waters ===
After repairs, Success was commissioned in August 1812, under the command of Captain Thomas Barclay, but reduced to 16 guns and employed as a troop ship. She operated on the coast of Spain in late 1812, then on the North American station from early 1813 during the War of 1812. There she was present at the attacks on Craney Island and Hampton, Virginia, in June 1813, and on the 21st of that month shared in the capture of the American ship Herman.

=== Fate ===
Success was hulked at Halifax, Nova Scotia, in 1814. She served there as a guard ship, prison ship, and as a powder hulk from 1817, before finally being broken up in 1820.
