= Selim Khimshiashvili =

Georgian politician

Selim Khimshiashvili (1755 – 3 June 1815) was a Georgian nobleman of the Khimshiashvili princedom and dukedom and a Beylerbey of Adjara under the Ottoman suzerainty, but with considerable autonomy. His seizure of power in the Pashalik of Akhaltsikh and attempts to bring all of "Ottoman Georgia" under his rule led to a fallout with the sultan's government and a war which ended in Selim's death.

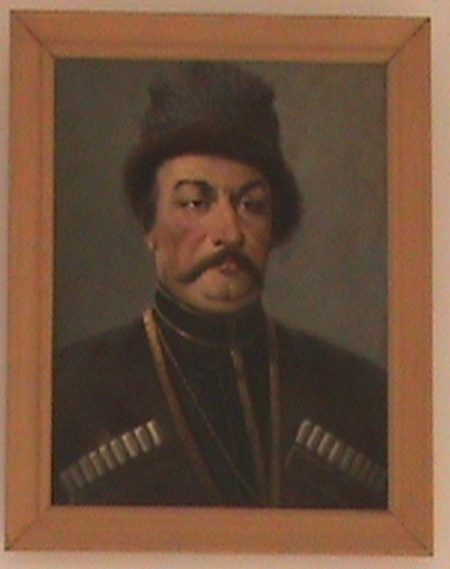

Prince & Duke Selim Bey was a son and successor of Abdullah Bey, a Beylerbey ("the lord of the valleys") of Upper Adjara, who was killed at Aketi during his raid against the neighboring Georgian principality of Guria in 1784. Selim Bey cherished an ambition to bring all of the Ottoman possessions in Georgia under his autonomous rule. In 1802, he capitalized on a crisis in Akhaltsikhe and seized control of it, declaring himself a new pasha. His adversary, Şerif Paşa, was able to dispossess him in June 1809, but Selim staged a comeback in 1812. His staunch opposition to the central Ottoman government led him into clandestine negotiations with the Russians through Mamia V Gurieli, Prince of Guria, whose sister was married to Selim's son Abdi Bey. In 1815, the Ottoman sultan Mahmud II ordered him to be deposed and put to death for treason. As 15,000 Ottoman troops under Pehlivan Ibrahim Pasha, serasker of Erzurum, approached, Selim fled Akhaltsikhe to the mountains of Adjara and entrenched himself in the castle of Khikhani, which fell after a two-month-long siege on 31 May 1815. Selim Pasha was beheaded on 3 June 1815. Selim's four sons—Abdi (Abdullah; 1786–1859), Ahmed (1781–1836), Husein, and Dede (Dursun)—took shelter in Guria until the Ottoman punitive force left Adjara in 1818. Subsequently, they came to rule several areas in "Ottoman Georgia": Abdi Bey in Shavsheti (Şavşat), Ahmed in Upper Adjara, Husein in the Andzavi valley, and Dede in Taoskari.

In today's Adjara, Selim is remembered as a hero. His native village Nigazeuli hosts his museum and the day of his memory, Selimoba, is marked annually in June. There is a street named after Selim Khimshiashvili in Adjara's main city, Batumi, where his statue was also unveiled in 2015.
