= Khulo Municipality =

Coordinates: 41°39′N 42°19′E

Khulo Municipality ხულო მუნიციპალიტეტი
- municipality
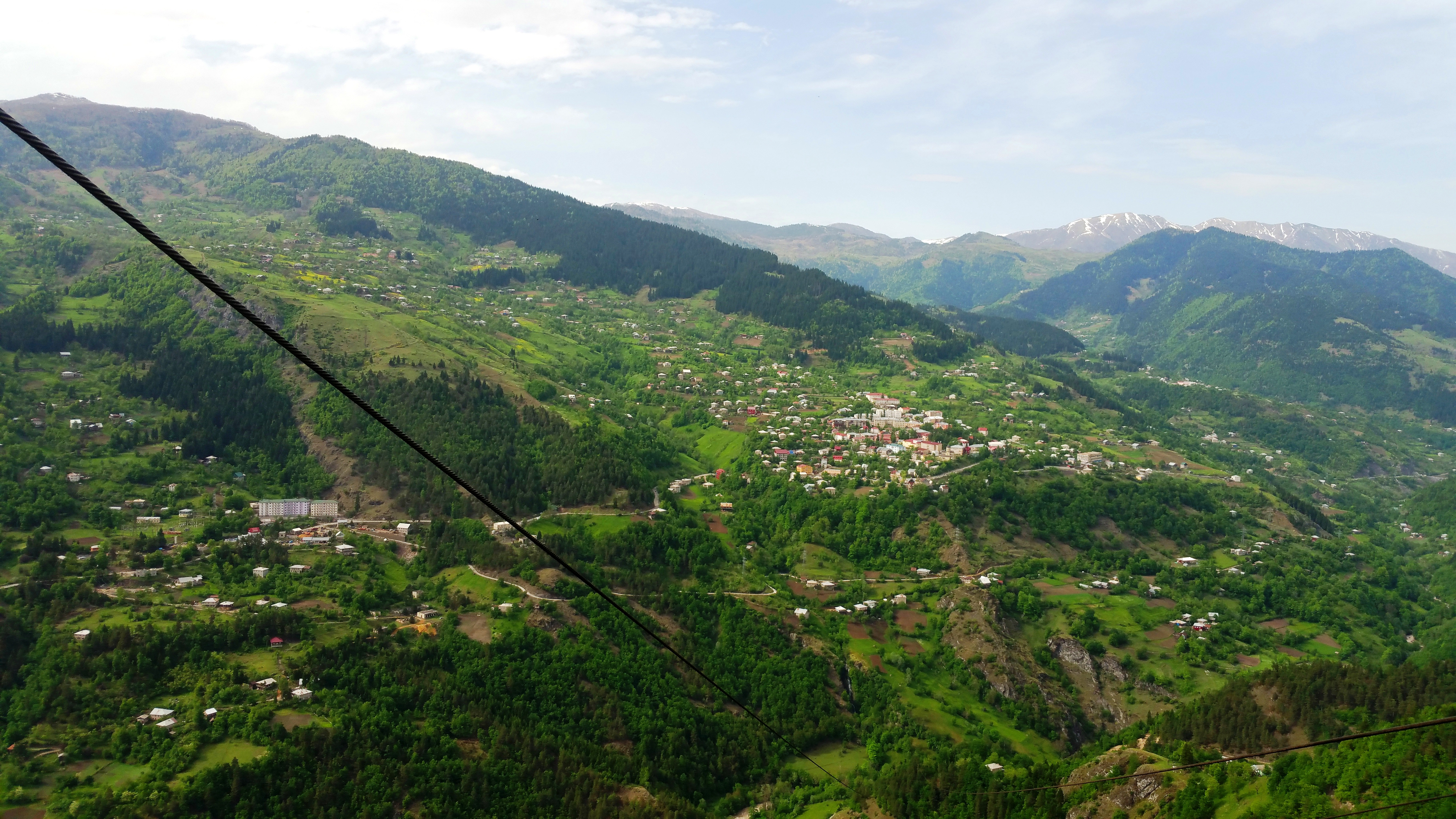
- Khulo Municipality

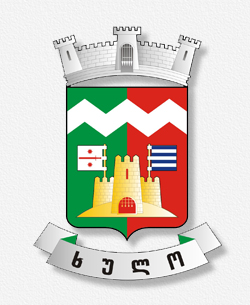
- Flag Seal

- Country: Georgia
- Autonomous Republic: Adjara
- Administrative centre: Khulo

Government
  - mayor: Vakhtang Beridze (GD)

Area
  - Total: 710 km^{2} (270 sq mi)

Population (2020)
  - Total: 35,520
  - Density: 50/km^{2} (130/sq mi)
- Time zone: UTC+4 (Georgian Time)
- Website: https://khulo.gov.ge/

Khulo (Georgian: ხულოს მუნიციპალიტეტი) is a district of Georgia, in the autonomous republic of Adjara. Its main town is Khulo.

Population: 35,520

Area: 710 km^{2}

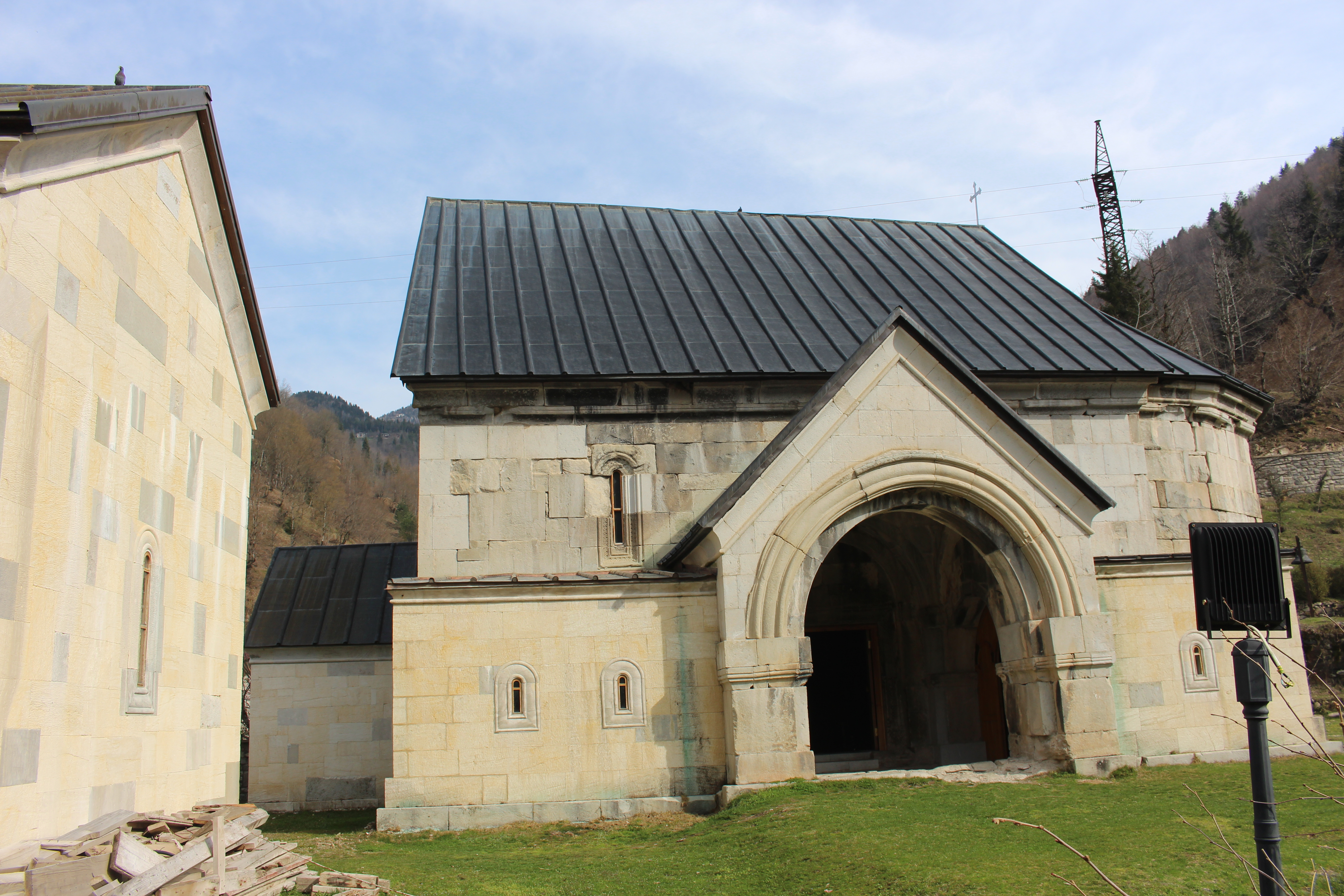
Skhalta Cathedral

== Politics ==
Khulo Municipal Assembly (Georgian: ხულოს საკრებულო, Khulo Sakrebulo) is a representative body in Khulo Municipality, consisting of 24 members which is elected every four years. The last election was held in October 2021. Vakhtang Beridze of Georgian Dream was elected mayor.

Party	2017	2021	Current Municipal Assembly
Georgian Dream	17	14	
United National Movement	6	6	
For Georgia		2	
Lelo		1	
Strategy Aghmashenebeli		1	
European Georgia	3		
Alliance of Patriots	1		
Free Georgia	1		
Total	28	24	

== Administrative divisions ==
River Adjaristskali

Town of khulo

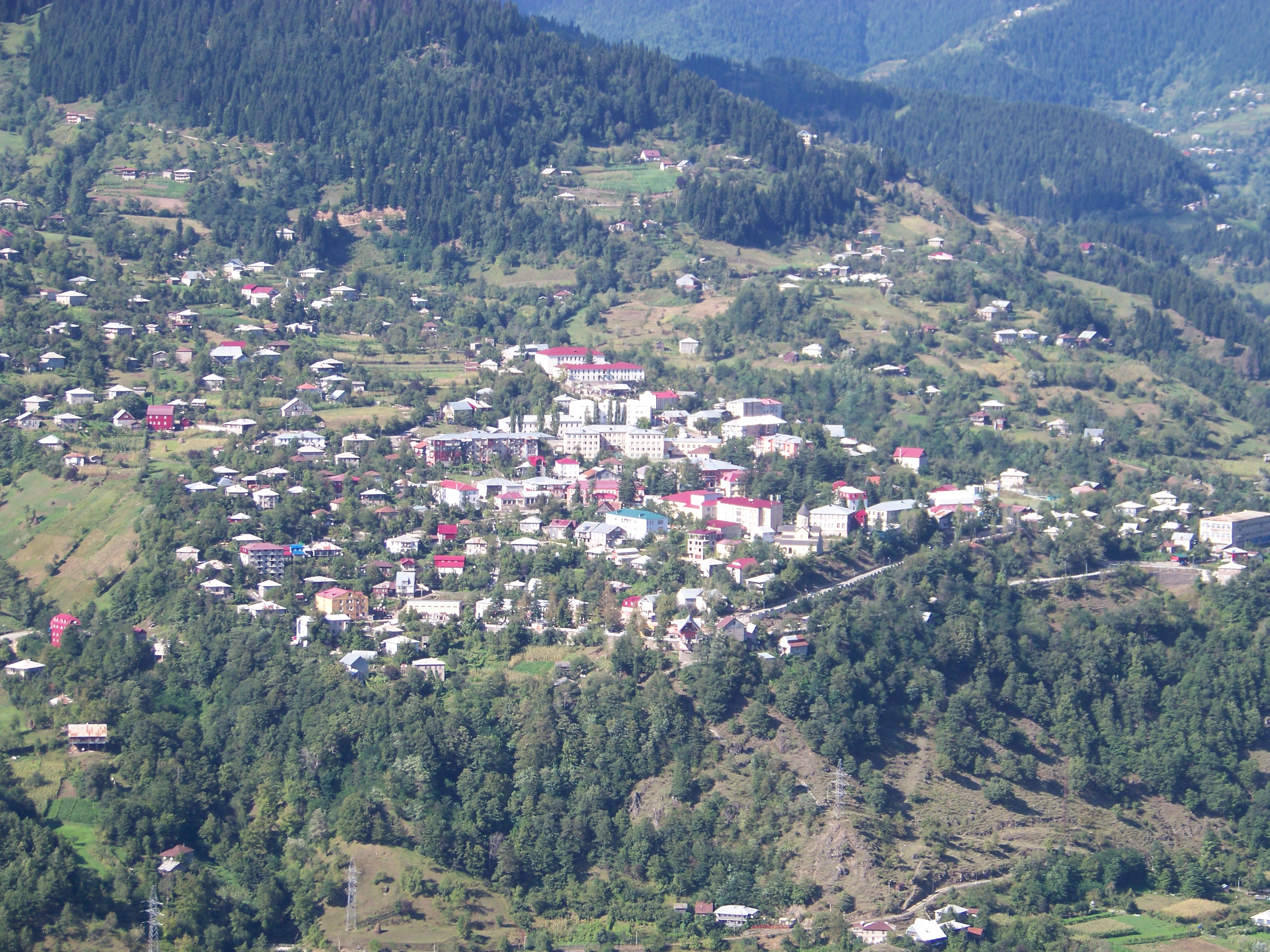
view of khulo

Khulo Municipality is divided into 1 borough (დაბა, daba), 12 communities (თემი, temi), and 78 villages (სოფელი, sopeli):

=== Boroughs ===
- Khulo

=== Communities ===
- Agara
- Dek'anashvilebi
- Didach'ara
- Diok'nisi
- Vashlovani
- Tkhilvana
- Riq'eti
- Satsikhuri
- Skhalti
- Pushruk'auli
- Ghorjomi
- Khikhadziri

=== Villages ===
- Agara
- Dek'anashvilebi
- Ganakhleba
- Godgadzeebi
- Gudasakho
- Diak'onidzeebi
- Duadzeebi
- K'urtskhali
- Okruashvilebi
- Uchkho
- Kedlebi
- Dzirk'vadzeebi
- Elelidzeebi
- Didach'ara
- Boghauri
- Iremadzeebi
- Diok'nisi
- Beghleti
- Geladzeebi
- Iakobadzeebi
- Kort'okhi
- Maniaketi
- P'aksadze
- T'abakhmela
- Ghorjomeladzeebi
- Ghurt'a
- Jvariketi
- Kveda Vashlovani
- Zeda Vashlovani
- Tago
- Skhandara
- Shurmuli
- Chao
- Zeda Tkhilvana
- Bako
- Mtisubani
- Kvemo Tkhilvana
- Riq'eti
- Bodzauri
- Danisparauli
- Shuasopeli
- Satsikhuri
- Gelaura
- Namonast'revi
- Pant'nari
- Q'inchauri
- Gurdzauli
- K'vat'ia
- Pachkha
- Q'ishla
- Dzmagula
- Ts'ablana
- Ch'eri
- Pushruk'auli
- Vernebi
- Makhalakauri
- Oshanakhevi
- Rakvta
- Ghorjomi
- Adadzeebi
- Akhaliubani
- Gorgadzeebi
- Vanadzeebi
- Vashaq'madzeebi
- Labaidzeebi
- Mek'eidzeebi
- Merchkheti
- Mekhalashvilebi
- Mintadzeebi
- St'epanashvilebi
- Tunadzeebi
- Kurduli
- Ts'ints'k'alashvilebi
- Ch'akhauri
- Khikhadziri
- Akhalsheni
- K'alota
- Sk'vana

== See also ==
- List of municipalities in Georgia (country)
