= Khimshiashvili =

Coat of arms of Princes Khimshiashvili in Kakheti

The House of Khimshiashvili (Georgian: ხიმშიაშვილი) was the name of several Georgian noble families, with their bases in the regions of Kakheti and Adjara. A Kakhetian family was part of the princely nobility of Georgia and, then, of the Russian Empire, while the Adjarian Khimshiashvili were important frontier beys under the Ottoman Empire and wielded noticeable influence in this part of southwestern Caucasus throughout the 19th century. The Russians rendered their family name as Khimshiyev (Russian: Химшиев) and as Adzharsky (Аджарский, "of Adjara"), while to the Turks they came to be known as Hamşioğlu.

== In Kakheti ==
The Khimshiashvili were purportedly descended from the Abazasdze family, which first appears in the Georgian annals in the 11th century. Their likely eponymous forefather, Khimshia Abazasdze, fought Timur's invading army in 1399 and then was granted by the king of Georgia lands in Kakheti. According to the historian Cyril Toumanoff, the latter-day Kakhetian noble family of Khimshiashvili descended from these "Abazads of Marili". The Khimshiashvili are included in the list of the Kakhetian princes (tavadi) attached to the Russo–Georgian Treaty of Georgievsk of 1783. On Russian annexation of Georgia, they had their rank (knyaz) recognized by the new regime, officially in 1850. Many of the Khimshiashvili pursued military careers, such as Georgy Khimshiyev (1836–1917), general of artillery in the Imperial Russian ranks, and Gogi Khimshiashvili (1892–1923), colonel in the Georgian service, who was executed by the Soviet regime.

== In Adjara ==
=== Origin ===
In the 18th century, a branch of the Khimshiashvili family was established of Adjara in southwest Georgia, then ruled by the Ottoman Empire. By the end of that century, they had been in control of Upper Adjara as one of the most important derebeys, semi-autonomous "lord of the valleys" in Ottoman Georgia. The circumstances of their appearance in this region are poorly documented; an oral tradition in Adjara had it that a Khimshiashvili nobleman, having killed a man in the Aragvi valley in eastern Georgia, had fled justice to the mountains of Adjara and settled in the village of Nigazeuli. On the other hand, Prince Ioane of Georgia, compiling his genealogy of Georgian noble families in the 1800s, claimed that the Khimshiashvili were originally from Adjara and some of them fled the Ottoman expansionism to Kakheti in 1605. In 1879, Şerif Bey Khimshiashvili asked the Russian authorities to help into inquiry into his family's genealogy, but the results of the research were not convincing.

=== Rise and fall ===
The first documented Adjarian Khimshiashvili was Abdullah Bey, killed during his raid into the neighboring Georgian Principality of Guria in 1784. His son Selim Bey sought to bring all of Ottoman Georgia under his rule and staged a coup in Akhaltsikhe in order to gain control of the Eyalet of Childir. After Selim's death in an Ottoman punitive expedition in 1815, his sons and successors, especially, Ahmed Bey, cooperated with the Ottoman government and extended their influence over the territory from the Gurian hills to the Oltu Çay. The Ottomans had to rely on these beys in their efforts to counter the Russian expansion. During the Russo-Turkish War (1828–29), they posed more threat to the Russians than the Ottoman "new model" army operating in the Caucasus. During the following two decades, the Ottoman government's "westernizing" tanzimat eliminated the semi-autonomous rule of derebeys. A revolt against this policy led by Kor Hussein Bey Khimshiashvili was put down in the 1840s. Eventually, Şerif Bey of Adjara, a Khimshiashvili, defected to the Russians during the war of 1877–78 and, thereby, was able to retain his property after the Russian takeover of Adjara. After the Russian Revolution of 1917 and the Soviet invasion of Georgia in 1921, many of his numerous descendants fled to Turkey, where they still live as Hamşioğlu.
