= Ivane Abazasdze =

Georgian nobleman

Ivane Abazasdze (Georgian: იოანე აბაზასძე) was an 11th-century Georgian nobleman of the Abazasdze family, who functioned as an eristavi ("duke") of Kartli under King Bagrat IV of Georgia (r. 1027–1072).

During King Bagrat's minority, Ivane Abazasdze assumed an important place in the country's aristocratic regency government. Alongside Liparit IV, Duke of Kldekari, he was instrumental in defeating al-Fadl b. Muhammad, the Shaddadid emir of Ganja in 1030 and capturing, in 1032, Jaffar III b. Ali, an emir of Tiflis, whom the Georgians dispossessed of the fortress of Birtvisi.

The regency advanced the positions of the high nobility whose influence Bagrat tried to limit when he assumed full ruling power. Bagrat's concessions to the powerful duke Liparit made Abazasdze envious. According to the Vita of George the Athonite by Giorgi Mtsire, Ivane and his four brothers withdrew into opposition to the king and plotted to kill him. However, Bagrat was able to capture them and cast in prison, depriving them of their titles.
