= HMS Colossus (1787) =

Coordinates: 49.9245167°N 006.3417500°W

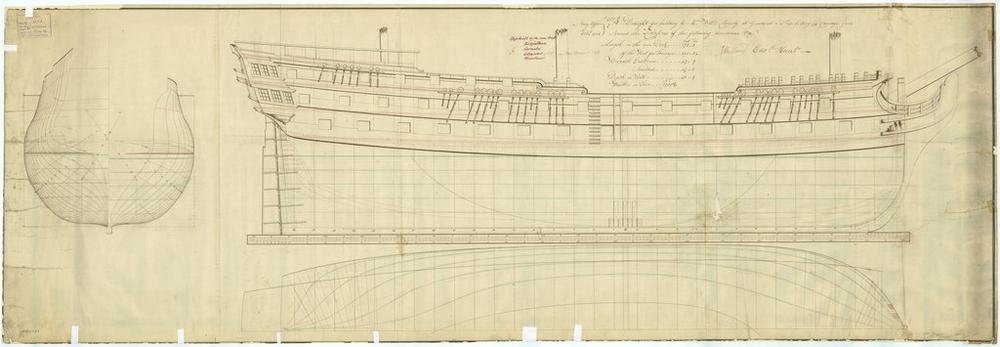
- HMS Colossus (1787)

History

Great Britain
- Name: HMS Colossus
- Ordered: 13 December 1781
- Builder: Clevely, Gravesend
- Laid down: October 1782
- Launched: 4 April 1787
- Fate: Wrecked, 10 December 1798
- Notes: Participated in: Battle of Groix; Battle of Cape St Vincent

General characteristics
- Class & type: Courageux-class ship of the line
- Tons burthen: 1703 bm
- Length: 172 ft 3 in (52.50 m) (gundeck)
- Beam: 47 ft 9 in (14.55 m)
- Depth of hold: 20 ft 9 1/2 in (6.3 m)
- Propulsion: Sails
- Sail plan: Full-rigged ship
- Armament: 74 guns: Gundeck: 28 × 32 pdrs; Upper gundeck: 28 × 18 pdrs; Quarterdeck: 14 × 9 pdrs; Forecastle: 4 × 9 pdrs

HMS Colossus was a 74-gun third-rate ship of the line of the Royal Navy, launched at Gravesend on 4 April 1787 and wrecked on 10 December 1798. During a decade of service she fought in several major fleet engagements of the French Revolutionary Wars and participated in the Battle of Groix as well as the Battle of Cape St Vincent. She was lost while returning to Britain carrying wounded personnel and cargo recovered after Mediterranean operations.

The ship took part in campaigns in the Atlantic and Mediterranean under senior commanders. After later duties that included convoy escort and cruising assignments, she was ordered home, transferring supplies to other vessels before departing with wounded sailors and a cargo that included antiquities collected by diplomat Sir William Hamilton. Severe winter weather forced her to seek shelter near the Isles of Scilly, where she grounded on submerged rocks; all but one of her crew survived.

The wreck lay undisturbed until its rediscovery in the late 20th century, when divers recovered artefacts later conserved and displayed in institutions such as the British Museum. The site is now a legally protected wreck administered by Historic England, and archaeological surveys have continued to document the remains, study the sinking, and conserve evidence from the vessel and its final voyage.

== Early history ==
On 6 June 1793, in the Bay of Biscay, she captured Vanneau, a tiny vessel with an armament of just six guns, which the Royal Navy took into service. The same year, Colossus was part of a large fleet of 51 warships of numerous types, including a Spanish squadron, but commanded overall by Vice Admiral Samuel Hood, 1st Viscount Hood.

== Siege of Toulon ==
The Fleet arrived off Toulon on 26 August 1793, with Lord Hood in the warship HMS Victory. The objective was to keep the French Fleet in check. In Toulon's port were 58 French warships, and Lord Hood was determined not to allow such a potent and dangerous fleet to be taken over by French revolutionary forces. The Bourbons, the Royalists of France, had managed to retain control of Toulon, a vital Mediterranean port. Upon the arrival of the British Fleet, the Bourbons duly surrendered the town and ships to Hood.

Sailors and Royal Marines began to land at Toulon from the ships of the Royal Navy Fleet, with the objective of taking possession of the key forts, which they succeeded in doing. The French Republican forces quickly mobilised, and began the siege of Toulon on 7 September. By 15 December, the British and Spanish withdrew, taking with them 15,000 Royalists, as well as destroying the dockyards and a large number of French warships. The Royal Navy lost 10 ships after the French captured the heights overlooking the harbour.

In 1795, Colossus was once again part of a large fleet action, the Battle of Groix. A fleet of 25 ships commanded by Admiral Lord Bridport on his flagship, Royal George, fought a French fleet of 23 warships under the command of Rear-Admiral Villaret-Joyeuse. The battle was immense and chaotic, and raged across a vast area, yet it came to an indecisive end, when Bridport ordered his Fleet to cease fighting at 7.15am, just four hours after the initial fighting had started. This decision allowed nine important French warships to escape. Colossus received damage, suffering three killed and thirty wounded. In total, British losses were 31 killed and 113 wounded. French losses are not known; it is estimated over 670 French sailors were killed or wounded, during skirmishes that resulted in the capture of three French warships.

Though Colossus was involved in much bitter fighting, her Scots captain, John Monkton, ordered his kilt-wearing piper to proceed to the maintop mast staysail netting and play the pipes throughout the battle, no doubt to the bemusement of the French sailors who witnessed it.

== Battle of Cape St. Vincent ==
In February 1797, Colossus (now commanded by Captain George Murray) was involved in yet another large-scale clash of fleets in the Battle of Cape St. Vincent. She was part of a 21-ship strong fleet (including 7 smaller craft) under the command of Admiral John Jervis in his flagship HMS Victory, against a Spanish Fleet of 27 ships commanded by Lieutenant-General Don José de Córdoba y Ramos. Colossus sustained serious damage, her sails being virtually shot away. It looked inevitable that she would be raked by Spanish warships, until Orion headed for Colossus and covered her.

The battle was a major victory for the Royal Navy. Despite being outnumbered, it captured four Spanish ships and crippled seven, including the largest warship afloat at that time - the Santísima Trinidad. Britain lost approximately 300 killed or wounded; the Spanish lost 1,092 killed or wounded, and 2,300 taken prisoner.

== Other action ==
As the fleet repaired at Naples Colossus was immediately sent "on a cruise off Malta". She then went to Gibraltar before returning to the now repaired fleet in Naples. In the summer, William Bolton (later Captain) was promoted to Lieutenant on the Colossus, and the ship on the obverse of the 1797 medal featuring William Bolton may represent Colossus. Colossus was not cannibalized; Captain Murray did, however, hand over to Nelson three of his guns and one bower anchor. This was done as Colossus had been ordered home to England, whereas the Vanguard was staying within the war zone. Loaded with Greek vases and wounded men from the battle of the Nile, Colossus set off for home. She stopped at Algiers and at Lisbon on the way. At Lisbon she joined a larger convoy that was "bound for Ireland and other northern ports". The convoy dispersed in the English Channel as planned.

=== Shipwreck ===
Approximate position of the wreck

Amidst the bad winter weather Colossus sighted the Isles of Scilly first and came to anchor in St Mary's Roads on 7 December. For three days she intended to ride out the storm, only for it to increase. On the night of 10 December an anchor cable parted and the ship ran aground on a submerged ledge of rock off Samson Island. Only one life was lost, that of Quartermaster Richard King who drowned when he fell overboard while trying to sound the lead. Boats were immediately put out from the island, and all of the other crew were transported to safety by the morning. On 11 December the ship settled on her side, the starboard beam ends touching the waves. Attempts to reboard her were thwarted by continued high seas.

On 15 December Colossus' mainmast and bowsprit broke away and it became clear she could no longer be refloated. A naval brig, Fearless, was able to put alongside the shipwrecked vessel on 29 December and bring away a quantity of stores and the body of Admiral Molyneux Shuldam which had been transported aboard Colossus for reburial in England. (Note: Admiral Shuldam's remains were ultimately laid to rest in Wyredsbury churchyard, Buckinghamshire on 9 January 1799.) No further salvage proved possible and the vessel sank entirely in early January 1799.

== Modern discovery and protection ==
In the closing years of the 1960s, Roland Morris, a marine salver, began diving on the site, searching for the antiquities that Colossus had been transporting. In 1974, he discovered Colossus, as well as fragments from the collection of Sir William Hamilton which Colossus had been transporting. Many of the items found were reconstructed and are now displayed at the British Museum in London.

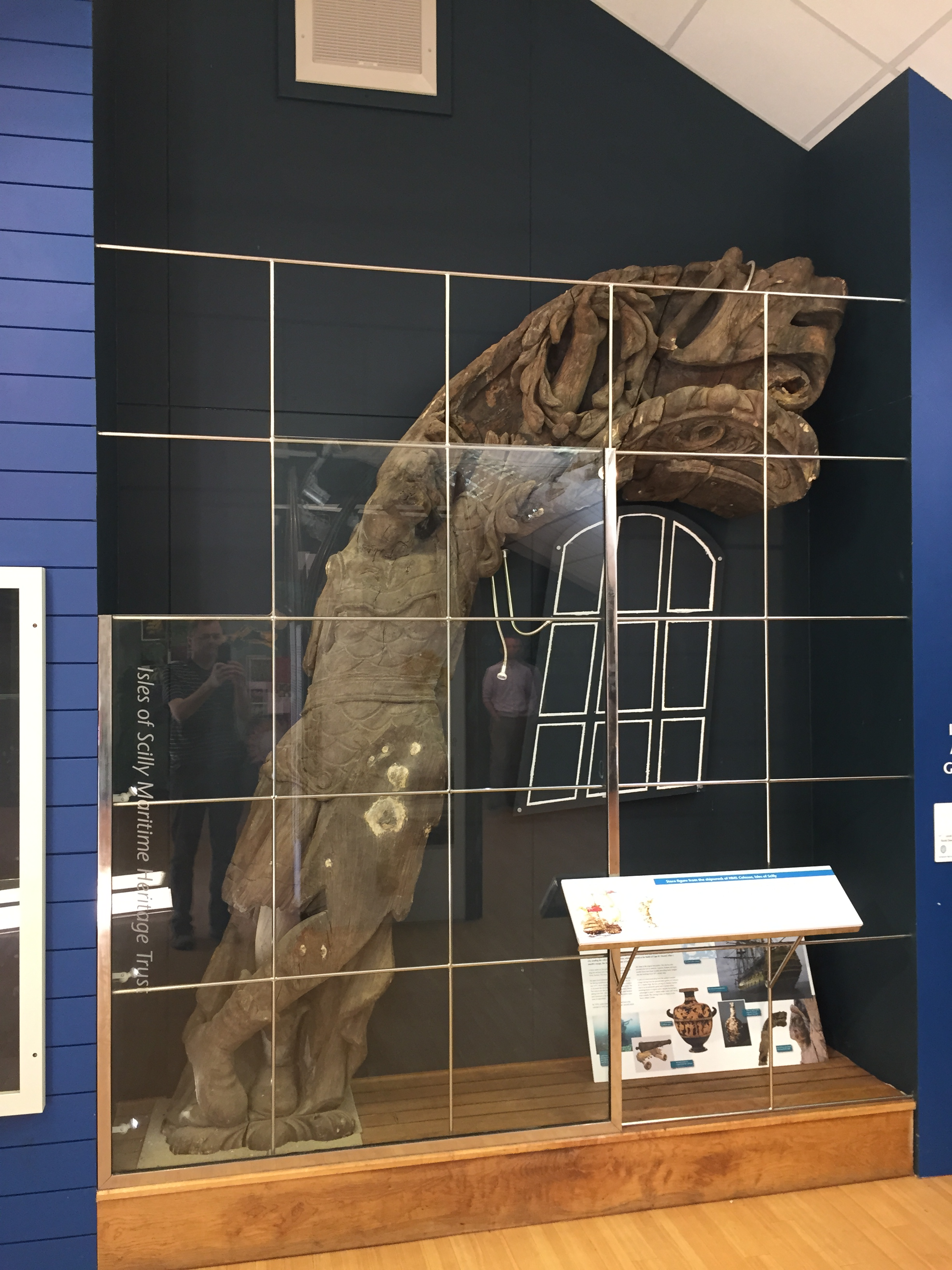
Stern figure from Colossus in Tresco Abbey Gardens

In 2000, a report from amateur diver Todd Stevens alerted the Receiver of Wreck to the existence of further remains. As a result of this new discovery the Isles of Scilly Museum in Hugh Town was handed a vast collection of artefacts from this wreck for display. These new remains turned out to be the stern of the wreck, which held a large carving from the stern port quarter gallery. This carving was claimed to have been discovered by local diver Carmen Stevens but not reported until the following year when the wreck site was designated on 4 July 2001 under the Protection of Wrecks Act as a result of the find when reported meaning that diving or other interference within 300 metres of the site was not permitted without a licence.

In August 2001 the Archaeological Diving Unit of the University of St Andrews obtained a survey licence and carried out a pre-disturbance survey of the site. The Colossus carving was recovered from the site in 2002 (as shown in a Time Team TV special in October 2002) and after conservation by the Mary Rose Trust, was returned to Scilly in 2010 to be placed on display in the Valhalla figurehead collection on Tresco Island. Further extensive licensed surveys were carried out by the Cornwall and Isles of Scilly Archaeological Society from 2003 to 2005.

Exploration of the wreck is ongoing year on year by Survey Licence Holder Todd Stevens and IMAG (The Islands Maritime Archaeological Group) who have produced an overall site plan of the whole wreck site. The Cornwall and Isles of Scilly Maritime Archaeology Society (CISMAS) has been routinely inspecting and recording the site since 2001. The CISMAS projects are funded and endorsed by Historic England (at the time called English Heritage). In May 2012 CISMAS embarked on an excavation of a portion of the stern of the wreck, focusing on recording finds related to the gun deck and on initiating a long-term reburial trial.

New wreck material was found in the vicinity of the stern in 2014, prompting further excavation work in 2015. This raised new questions about the wrecking process which was investigated in 2017, leading to a new wrecking theory.

In 2018 Historic England published the investigation and conservation of artefacts from HMS Colossus, thought to be a small concentration of personal items (50 buttons, a bone brush/ shoe horn and a textile fragment) recovered under a surface recovery license by the 2014 Cornwall and Isles of Scilly Maritime Archaeological Society (CISMAS) team. The objects were analysed and stabilised by the Historic England conservation lab, at Fort Cumberland, Portsmouth.

== See also ==
- List of shipwrecks of the Isles of Scilly
