= Ivane Nanuashvili =

Georgian military activist, officer of the Polish Army and political emigrant

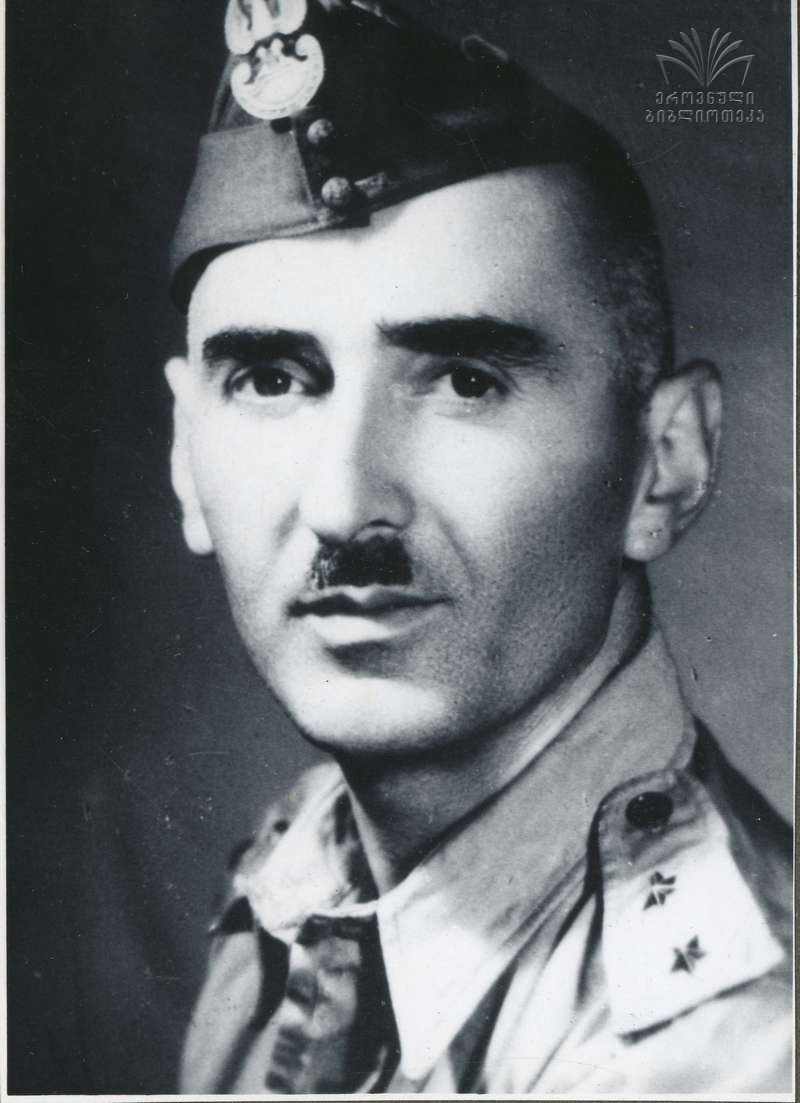
Vano Nanuashvili/ Jan Nanuaszwili

Ivane (Vano) Nanuaschvili or Jan Nanuashvili (Georgian: ივანე (ვანო) ნანუაშვილი, ɪvɑnɛ (vɑnɔ) nɑnʊɑʃvɪlɪ; January 1, 1902 – 1974) was a Georgian military activist, officer of the Polish Army, political emigrant. Vano Nanuashvili contributed to the popularization of Georgian culture and history, as well as the question of Georgian independence.

== Early life and education ==
Vano Nanuashvili was born in Georgia on January 1, 1902. In 1912-1920, he studied in Tbilisi 5th General Education School. In 1920-1921 he was a student of the Georgian Military Academy of Tbilisi (Officers School). In March–April 1921, during the Georgian-Russian war, he participated in the battle as a cadet of the Officers’ School. After the occupation of the Democratic Republic of Georgia by the Soviet Russia, Vano Nanuashvili emigrated from his home country together with the Georgian officers.

In April–June 1921 he was in Istanbul, from June 1921 to 1922 he studied at the Greek Military Academy in Athens, in 1923-1925 he is a student of the Military Academy of Warsaw. In 1939, from the beginning of the Second World War, Vano Nanuashvili, as a member of the Polish Army, took part in the Polish war campaign against Germany. During one of the battles he was captured. In 1939-1944 he was a war prisoner in Germany. In 1944 he managed to escape from German captivity and continued to fight against German Army in Italy.

After the Second World War, Vano Nanuashvili ceased his military activity. From 1948-1951 he lived in London. In 1951 he left for the United States, living in New York City from 1951-1954. From 1954-1960 he lived in Boston and worked at various factories. For the last period of his life, 1960-1974, he lived in San Francisco.

== Political Activity ==
After his emigration, Vano Nanuashvili devoted himself to gaining the independence of Georgia. He founded various organizations and took an active part in them. In 1928 he founded the Association of the Emigrated Georgian Officers. He has been its secretary for 9 years and was the editor of the Georgian military and political magazine "Mkhedari." Vano Nanuashvili was one of the founders of the magazine "Georgian Home in San Francisco," published in Georgian and English. Vano Nanuashvili was a member of the Executive Committee of the Occupied Nations.

Vano Nanuashvili wrote military and political articles and books in English. In 1956 in Boston he published his book "Power and Weakness of the Soviet Union". His book "What Everyone in the Free World Should Know about Russia" was popular in Europe and in the United States, in 2012 the book was published in Georgian language. He died in the United States.

== Sources ==
Vano Nanuashvili’s personal archive, preserved at the National Centre of Manuscripts (Tbilisi, Georgia)

== Literature ==
- Grishikashvili, Ambrosi, Captain Vano Nanuashvili: Georgians in Poland, Tbilisi, 2008, p. 194–199 (Georgian: გრიშიკაშვილი, ამბროსი, კაპიტანი ვანო ნანუაშვილი: ქართველები პოლონეთში, თბილისი, 2008, გვ. 194–199).
- Murusidze, Shorena, The Archival Heritage of Ivane (Vano) Nanuashvili for the Study of the History of Georgian Political Emigration, Tbilisi, 2013, p. 137-139 (Georgian: მურუსიძე, შორენა, ივანე (ვანო) ნანუაშვილის საარქივო მემკვიდრეობა ქართული პოლიტიკური ემიგრაციის ისტორიის კვლევისათვის, თბილისი, 2013, გვ. 137-139).
