= Tom Vano =

American field hockey player

Thomas Vano (born October 26, 1970, in Plainfield, New Jersey) is a former field hockey goalkeeper from the United States, who finished twelfth with the national squad at the 1996 Summer Olympics in Atlanta.
