= Vanneau (ship) =

History

France
- Name: Vanneau
- Namesake: The lapwing
- Builder: Daniel Denÿs, Dunkirk
- Laid down: January 1782
- Launched: 25 July 1782
- Fate: Captured Bay of Biscay, 6 June 1793

Great Britain
- Acquired: Captured 6 June 1793
- Fate: Wrecked 1796

General characteristics
- Type: Cerf-Volant-class lugger
- Tons burthen: 120 (bm)
- Armament: 6 × 4-pounder guns
- Notes: Copper sheathing

Vanneau, launched in 1782, was a lugger aviso or cutter of the French Royal Navy. The British captured her in 1793 and brought her into the Royal Navy. She served briefly in the Mediterranean before being wrecked in 1796.

== French service and capture ==
Denys and Baron de Brave built her at Dunkirk and launched her on 25 July 1782. She was copper sheathed during construction. Initially she was armed with four 3-pounder guns, but by the time she was captured she carried six 4-pounders.

In 1787 she came briefly under the command of Julien Marie Cosmao-Kerjulien. She was sent by Castries to Cherbourg under Cloupes, to be crewed up for missions in the Channel. In August the chevalier de Maulevrier was ordered to reconnoitre the position of the British fleet in the Channel, which he eventually found conducting manoeuvres in Plymouth bay (George III was visiting Plymouth at the time). On her return to Cherbourg she was revictualled and prepared for another mission under Camelin. Later that year the French navy sent Vanneau to reconnoitre the Isle of Wight. On her return, her commander, Sous-lieutenant de vaisseau Camelin, filed a false report, having also falsified his vessel's log. He was found out, dis-ranked, expelled from the navy, and was sentenced to a year in prison.

Between July and November 1790, Vanneau was under the command of Sous-lieutenant de vaisseau Motard, patrolling the southern coasts of the United Kingdom from Cherbourg. In February 1792 she was patrolling between Cape La Hève and Saint-Malo, while under the command of acting Enseigne de vaisseau non entretenu Guérin de l'Épinay.

On 6 June 1793 Vanneau was in the Bay of Biscay when she encountered Colossus. The Royal Navy took Vanneau into service under her existing name.

== British service ==
After her capture, the British commissioned Vanneau in May under the command of Lieutenant L.J. Woolstoncraft; she then served to carry dispatches to the Mediterranean. On 8 November 1794, Admiral Hotham placed Lieutenant John Gourly (or Gourlay) in command of Vanneau. On 15 January 1795 a major storm hit Corsica, and especially Bastia, wrecking a number of vessels and damaging Vanneau

That spring, while Gourly and Vanneau were at Bastia, ten English captains and a boy, all former prisoners of the French, arrived there in a cartel, utterly destitute. Gourly met them and took them to dinner. They informed him that as they were unknown locally, no one would accept their bills drawn on their bankers in England, and that they needed £55 in total for their immediate support. Gourly immediately went to the British commissary-general, the Honourable John Erskine, and asked Erskine to cash his bill for that amount. Erskine refused, saying that he would simply lend Gourly the money, but asked what it was for. On being told the story, Erskine immediately stated that as he could better afford the loss than Gourly, should the captains fail to repay, he would lend them the money directly. A few days later Vanneau took the men to Leghorn, where they were able to write bills and remit to Erskine the entire amount they owed.

A midshipman and two sailors from Vanneau died at Leghorn in 1795 and are buried in the British cemetery there.

In June 1796, Napoleon and his forces captured Leghorn. Gourly and Vanneau rescued the British factory (trading post) and much valuable property. Vanneau then escorted the British army troops that had participated on 10 July in the capture of Portoferraio, in Elba.

Vanneau and Gourly were particularly instrumental in the capture of island of Capraja. Gilbert Elliot, the British viceroy of the Anglo-Corsican Kingdom, decided that it was necessary to clear out Capraja, which belonged to the Genoese and which served as a base for privateers. He sent Lord Nelson in Captain, together with the transport Gorgon, Vanneau, the cutter Rose, and troops of the 51st Regiment of Foot in September to accomplish this task. On their way, Minerva joined them. Nelson put 250 soldiers aboard Vanneau and Rose, which landed them on the north side of the island. The troops captured a 2-gun battery on the heights above the town there. While Rose carried the news of this success around to Nelson, who was having difficulty landing troops on the south side, Vanneau blockaded the port on the north side, where three privateers were anchored. Minerva joined him, and on 18 September, so did Nelson and the rest of the troops. They landed on 18 September. The crews of the privateers destroyed their vessels and the island surrendered without any further resistance.

== Fate ==
On 21 October 1796 Vanneau was wrecked at Porto-Ferrajo, Elba. She was sailing out of the harbour on a secret mission when she twice missed her stays. When the anchors she put out did not hold she was swept onto on a sunken rock.

Admiral Waldegrave presided over the court martial. Unusually, Lord Nelson made a point of asserting his precedence on the board, after Waldegrave but ahead of the senior captain of the fleet, on the basis of his position as Commodore. He may have done this to exert a greater sway in the proceedings as Gourly had been a lieutenant under him on Agamemnon. Whether Nelson's intervention was necessary or not, the court martial acquitted Gourly of the loss of Vanneau.
