= 2012 Adjaran legislative election =

← 2008	1 October 2012	2016 →
- 21 seats in the Supreme Council of Adjara; 11 seats needed for a majority
Party	Leader	Vote %	Seats
Georgian Dream	Bidzina Ivanishvili	57.66	13
UNM	Mikheil Saakashvili	37.01	8
This lists parties that won seats. See the complete results below.
Chairman of the Supreme Council before	Chairman of the Supreme Council after
Mikheil Makharadze; United National Movement	Avtandil Beridze; Georgian Dream

Legislative elections were held in Adjara, an autonomous republic within Georgia, on October 1, 2012. Adjara elected its 21-member parliament, Supreme Council, in the region's 6th local legislative election since Georgia declared independence from the Soviet Union in 1991.

== Background ==
The 21-member Supreme Council of Adjara is elected for a 4-year term. Six of its members are in single-member constituencies and the remaining 15 seats are filled through proportional representation from parties which clear a 5% threshold.

The last election, held in November 2008, was won by Georgia's ruling United National Movement, which had 15 seats in the Council. The remaining 3 seats were won by the opposition Christian-Democratic Movement.

== Results ==
The election was held simultaneously with the nationwide parliamentary election on October 1, 2012. The opposition Georgian Dream coalition, spearheaded by Bidzina Ivanishvili, received 57.66% of votes in the proportional, party-list contest; the incumbent United National Movement party, led by President of Georgia Mikheil Saakashvili, garnered 37.01%. Other five parties, which were running in the Adjara election, failed to clear 5% threshold. The Christian-Democratic Movement received 2.82%, the Georgian Labour Party 1.28%, and the New Rights 0.56%. The Georgian Dream candidates won in 3 out of Adjara's 6 single-mandate constituencies (Batumi, Kobuleti, and Khelvachauri); other 3 constituencies (Keda, Khulo, and Shuakhevi) were won by the United National Movement.

As a result, the Georgian Dream secured 13 seats and the remaining 8 seats were taken by the United National Movement.

Party	Proportional			Constituency			Total seats
Party	Votes	%	Seats	Votes	%	Seats	Total seats
Georgian Dream	103,160	57.66	10	98,313	55.46	3	13
United National Movement	66,206	37.01	5	66,891	37.74	3	8
Christian Democratic Union	5,053	2.82	0	5,947	3.36	0	0
Georgian Labour Party	2,286	1.28	0	2,196	1.24	0	0
New Rights Party	993	0.56	0	1,676	0.95	0	0
Free Georgia	750	0.42	0	1,496	0.84	0	0
For a Fair Georgia	457	0.26	0	737	0.42	0	0
Total	178,905	100.00	15	177,256	100.00	6	21
Valid votes	178,905	97.07					
Invalid/blank votes	5,405	2.93					
Total votes	184,310	100.00					
Registered voters/turnout	304,930	60.44					
Source: SEC, SEC

=== By constituency ===
Nº79 Batumi
Candidate	Party	Votes	%
Ak'ak'i Dzneladze	Georgian Dream	48,498	62.89
Robert' Chkhaidze	United National Movement	23,800	30.86
Niaz Zosidze	Christian Democratic Union	2,048	2.66
Davit Robakidze	Georgian Labour Party	1,182	1.53
Guram Turmanidze	Free Georgia	737	0.96
Jumber Mikeladze	New Rights Party	585	0.76
Mamuk'a Mikeladze	For a Fair Georgia	263	0.34
Total		77,113	100.00
Registered voters/turnout		133,951	–

Nº80 Keda
Candidate	Party	Votes	%
Irak'li Baramidze	United National Movement	5,161	47.62
Nodar Dzneladze	Georgian Dream	4,608	42.51
Nadezhda Jabnidze	Christian Democratic Union	580	5.35
Gela Gorgiladze	New Rights Party	229	2.11
Murad Beridze	For a Fair Georgia	98	0.90
Naime Dzneladze	Georgian Labour Party	97	0.89
Roman Bedinadze	Free Georgia	66	0.61
Total		10,839	100.00
Registered voters/turnout		15,751	–

Nº81 Kobuleti
Candidate	Party	Votes	%
Anzor Tkhilaishvili	Georgian Dream	21,130	54.73
Jansugh Jinch'aradze	United National Movement	15,240	39.47
Nugzar Bajelidze	Christian Democratic Union	1,095	2.84
Bela Beradze	Georgian Labour Party	596	1.54
Irak'li Kharazi	Free Georgia	247	0.64
Khatuna K'akhadze	New Rights Party	180	0.47
Ketevan Gujabidze	For a Fair Georgia	123	0.32
Total		38,611	100.00
Registered voters/turnout		69,239	–

Nº82 Shuakhevi
Candidate	Party	Votes	%
Mikheil Khavanadze	United National Movement	5,576	59.36
Jemal Put'k'aradze	Georgian Dream	2,525	26.88
Nugzar Put'k'aradze	Christian Democratic Union	725	7.72
Ioseb Davitadze	New Rights Party	216	2.30
Tamar Mikeladze	Georgian Labour Party	155	1.65
Shalva Veliadze	Free Georgia	118	1.26
Otar Put'k'aradze	For a Fair Georgia	79	0.84
Total		9,394	100.00
Registered voters/turnout		15,157	–

Nº83 Khelvachauri
Candidate	Party	Votes	%
Temur Kakhidze	Georgian Dream	17,147	63.61
Vazha Bolkvadze	United National Movement	8,431	31.28
Zaza Shashik'adze	Christian Democratic Union	871	3.23
Temur Kidzinidze	New Rights Party	213	0.79
Iamze Tsent'eradze	Free Georgia	156	0.58
Simon Gogit'idze	For a Fair Georgia	138	0.51
Total		26,956	100.00
Registered voters/turnout		46,597	–

Nº84 Khulo
Candidate	Party	Votes	%
Temur Bolkvadze	United National Movement	8,683	60.54
Amiran Mamuladze	Georgian Dream	4,405	30.71
Robert' Khozrevanidze	Christian Democratic Union	628	4.38
Nana Khalvashi	New Rights Party	253	1.76
Murman K'ochalidze	Free Georgia	172	1.20
Zaur Dek'anadze	Georgian Labour Party	166	1.16
Tuntul K'ontselidze	For a Fair Georgia	36	0.25
Total		14,343	100.00
Registered voters/turnout		24,235	–
