= 2016 Adjaran legislative election =

| ← 2012 | 8 October 2016 (first round); 30 October 2016 (second round) | 2020 → |
- 21 seats in the Supreme Council of Adjara; 11 seats needed for a majority
| Party | Leader | Vote % | Seats | +/– |
|---|---|---|---|---|
| Georgian Dream | Giorgi Kvirikashvili | 45.13 | 14 | +1 |
| UNM | Davit Bakradze | 29.62 | 5 | −3 |
| DMUG | Nino Burjanadze | 5.89 | 1 | New |
| Alliance of Patriots | Irma Inashvili | 5.7 | 1 | New |
This lists parties that won seats. See the complete results below.
| Chairman of the Supreme Council before | Chairman of the Supreme Council after |
|---|---|
| Avtandil Beridze; Georgian Dream | Avtandil Beridze; Georgian Dream |

Legislative elections were held in Adjara, an autonomous republic within Georgia, on 8 October 2016. Adjara elected its 21-member parliament, Supreme Council, in the region's 7th local legislative election since Georgia declared independence from the Soviet Union in 1991.

== Background ==
The 21-member Supreme Council of Adjara is elected for a 4-year term. Six of its members are in single-member constituencies and the remaining 15 seats are filled through proportional representation from parties which clear a 5% threshold.

== Results ==
The election was held simultaneously with the nationwide parliamentary election on 8 October 2016. The ruling Georgian Dream party received 45.13% of votes in the proportional, party-list contest, followed by the opposition United National Movement party with 29.62%, Nino Burjanadze's Democratic Movement with 5.89%, and the Alliance of Patriots of Georgia with 5.7%, winning respectively eight, five, one and one seat each. A majoritarian election in Adjara's all six single-mandate constituencies went into run-off on 30 October 2016, which were won by the Georgian Dream candidates, securing a 14-seat majority in the Supreme Council of Adjara.

| Party | Proportional | | | Constituency (first round) | | | Constituency (second round) | | | Total seats |
| Party | Votes | % | Seats | Votes | % | Seats | Votes | % | Seats | Total seats |
|---|---|---|---|---|---|---|---|---|---|---|
| Georgian Dream – Democratic Georgia | 71,039 | 45.13 | 8 | 67,037 | 43.23 | 0 | 78,848 | 70.56 | 6 | 14 |
| United National Movement | 46,628 | 29.62 | 5 | 43,995 | 28.37 | 0 | 32,904 | 29.44 | 0 | 5 |
| Democratic Movement | 9,268 | 5.89 | 1 | 9,058 | 5.84 | 0 | | | | 1 |
| Alliance of Patriots | 8,980 | 5.70 | 1 | 10,724 | 6.92 | 0 | | | | 1 |
| Free Democrats | 4,952 | 3.15 | 0 | 6,078 | 3.92 | 0 | | | | 0 |
| State for the People | 4,616 | 2.93 | 0 | 5,024 | 3.24 | 0 | | | | 0 |
| Georgian Labour Party | 3,834 | 2.44 | 0 | 2,726 | 1.76 | 0 | | | | 0 |
| Republicans | 2,363 | 1.50 | 0 | 3,517 | 2.27 | 0 | | | | 0 |
| Industrialists–Our Fatherland | 1,714 | 1.09 | 0 | 1,328 | 0.86 | 0 | | | | 0 |
| National Forum | 1,624 | 1.03 | 0 | 2,339 | 1.51 | 0 | | | | 0 |
| Serve Georgia | 1,133 | 0.72 | 0 | 1,854 | 1.20 | 0 | | | | 0 |
| Our People, People's Party | 354 | 0.22 | 0 | 505 | 0.33 | 0 | | | | 0 |
| United Georgia | 348 | 0.22 | 0 | 678 | 0.44 | 0 | | | | 0 |
| For Georgia's Peace | 293 | 0.19 | 0 | 194 | 0.13 | 0 | | | | 0 |
| Unified Communist Party of Georgia | 272 | 0.17 | 0 | | | | | | | 0 |
| Total | 157,418 | 100.00 | 15 | 155,057 | 100.00 | 0 | 111,752 | 100.00 | 6 | 21 |
| Valid votes | 157,418 | 96.33 | | 155,057 | 94.88 | | | | | |
| Invalid/blank votes | 6,001 | 3.67 | | 8,362 | 5.12 | | | | | |
| Total votes | 163,419 | 100.00 | | 163,419 | 100.00 | | | | | |
| Registered voters/turnout | 308,506 | 52.97 | | 308,506 | 52.97 | | | | | |
Source: SEC, SEC

=== By constituency ===
District Nº68 Batumi
| Candidate | Party | First round | | Second round | |
| Candidate | Party | Votes | % | Votes | % |
|---|---|---|---|---|---|
| Vakht'ang Ts'uladze | Georgian Dream – Democratic Georgia | 10,268 | 41.30 | 11,775 | 66.58 |
| Elguja Bagrat'ioni | United National Movement | 8,425 | 33.89 | 5,911 | 33.42 |
| T'ariel Mamulaishvili | Alliance of Patriots | 1,549 | 6.23 | | |
| Levan Jinch'aradze | Democratic Movement | 1,296 | 5.21 | | |
| Jaba Beridze | Free Democrats | 773 | 3.11 | | |
| Zviad Bolkvadze | State for the People | 748 | 3.01 | | |
| Jelal Kikava | Georgian Labour Party | 478 | 1.92 | | |
| Zaur Akhvlediani | Republicans | 409 | 1.65 | | |
| Jamila Minjia | National Forum | 262 | 1.05 | | |
| Liana Abuladze | Serve Georgia | 196 | 0.79 | | |
| Ramaz Surmanidze | For Georgia's Peace | 194 | 0.78 | | |
| Giorgi Asatiani | Industrialists–Our Fatherland | 191 | 0.77 | | |
| Mark'ela Chkhaidze | United Georgia | 71 | 0.29 | | |
| Total | | 24,860 | 100.00 | 17,686 | 100.00 |
| Valid votes | | 24,860 | 94.95 | | |
| Invalid/blank votes | | 1,321 | 5.05 | | |
| Total votes | | 26,181 | 100.00 | | |
| Registered voters/turnout | | 53,062 | 49.34 | | |

District Nº69 Batumi
| Candidate | Party | First round | | Second round | |
| Candidate | Party | Votes | % | Votes | % |
|---|---|---|---|---|---|
| Ilia Verdzadze | Georgian Dream – Democratic Georgia | 10,378 | 43.07 | 10,622 | 69.87 |
| Nino Jinch'aradze | United National Movement | 6,532 | 27.11 | 4,580 | 30.13 |
| Mamuli Zhghent'i | Alliance of Patriots | 1,646 | 6.83 | | |
| Dimit'ri Ch'eishvili | Democratic Movement | 1,227 | 5.09 | | |
| K'oba Chkheidze | Free Democrats | 1,191 | 4.94 | | |
| Davit Berdzenishvili | Republicans | 843 | 3.50 | | |
| Malkhaz Nak'ashidze | State for the People | 770 | 3.20 | | |
| Darejan Alania | Georgian Labour Party | 427 | 1.77 | | |
| Tina Imnadze | National Forum | 389 | 1.61 | | |
| Bidzina Apkhazava | Serve Georgia | 241 | 1.00 | | |
| Roman Jikia | Industrialists–Our Fatherland | 195 | 0.81 | | |
| Manuchar Abashidze | Our People, People's Party | 185 | 0.77 | | |
| Nugzar Kamashidze | United Georgia | 72 | 0.30 | | |
| Total | | 24,096 | 100.00 | 15,202 | 100.00 |
| Valid votes | | 24,096 | 94.46 | | |
| Invalid/blank votes | | 1,413 | 5.54 | | |
| Total votes | | 25,509 | 100.00 | | |
| Registered voters/turnout | | 53,035 | 48.10 | | |

District Nº70 Batumi
| Candidate | Party | First round | | Second round | |
| Candidate | Party | Votes | % | Votes | % |
|---|---|---|---|---|---|
| Nugzar Surmanidze | Georgian Dream – Democratic Georgia | 11,191 | 44.25 | 11,925 | 71.21 |
| Gia Abuladze | United National Movement | 7,453 | 29.47 | 4,821 | 28.79 |
| Archil Mamuladze | Alliance of Patriots | 1,689 | 6.68 | | |
| Shakro P'ap'idze | Democratic Movement | 1,141 | 4.51 | | |
| Armaz Bakht'adze | Free Democrats | 922 | 3.65 | | |
| Beka Diasamidze | State for the People | 603 | 2.38 | | |
| Besik' Khoridze | Georgian Labour Party | 595 | 2.35 | | |
| Giorgi Masalk'ini | Republicans | 533 | 2.11 | | |
| Zaal Japaridze | National Forum | 363 | 1.44 | | |
| Medea Vasadze | Serve Georgia | 321 | 1.27 | | |
| Nodar Melikishvili | Industrialists–Our Fatherland | 266 | 1.05 | | |
| Anzor Davitadze | Our People, People's Party | 151 | 0.60 | | |
| Jemal Megrelidze | United Georgia | 63 | 0.25 | | |
| Total | | 25,291 | 100.00 | 16,746 | 100.00 |
| Valid votes | | 25,291 | 95.00 | | |
| Invalid/blank votes | | 1,332 | 5.00 | | |
| Total votes | | 26,623 | 100.00 | | |
| Registered voters/turnout | | 52,866 | 50.36 | | |

District Nº71 Kobuleti
| Candidate | Party | First round | | Second round | |
| Candidate | Party | Votes | % | Votes | % |
|---|---|---|---|---|---|
| Giorgi Romanadze | Georgian Dream – Democratic Georgia | 11,565 | 43.55 | 14,192 | 71.51 |
| Mamuli Surmanidze | United National Movement | 6,936 | 26.12 | 5,654 | 28.49 |
| Avtandil Khabazi | Alliance of Patriots | 3,176 | 11.96 | | |
| Khvicha Gamarjobadze | Democratic Movement | 1,119 | 4.21 | | |
| Levan Khinik'adze | Republicans | 915 | 3.45 | | |
| Davit Manelishvili | State for the People | 791 | 2.98 | | |
| K'akhaber K'ak'aladze | Free Democrats | 562 | 2.12 | | |
| Mamuk'a Eselidze | Industrialists–Our Fatherland | 333 | 1.25 | | |
| Temur Tkhilaishvili | United Georgia | 289 | 1.09 | | |
| Sopio Tsetskhladze | National Forum | 278 | 1.05 | | |
| Nana Inasaridze | Georgian Labour Party | 270 | 1.02 | | |
| Nodari Khakhut'aishvili | Serve Georgia | 225 | 0.85 | | |
| Gogi Gogit'idze | Our People, People's Party | 99 | 0.37 | | |
| Total | | 26,558 | 100.00 | 19,846 | 100.00 |
| Valid votes | | 26,558 | 94.79 | | |
| Invalid/blank votes | | 1,459 | 5.21 | | |
| Total votes | | 28,017 | 100.00 | | |
| Registered voters/turnout | | 49,319 | 56.81 | | |

District Nº 72 Khelvachauri
| Candidate | Party | First round | | Second round | |
| Candidate | Party | Votes | % | Votes | % |
|---|---|---|---|---|---|
| Merab K'aranadze | Georgian Dream – Democratic Georgia | 9,475 | 40.31 | 13,031 | 72.19 |
| Kenan K'akhidze | United National Movement | 6,355 | 27.04 | 5,019 | 27.81 |
| Levan Lortkipanidze | Alliance of Patriots | 1,913 | 8.14 | | |
| Shukri Brunjadze | Democratic Movement | 1,669 | 7.10 | | |
| Jemal Beridze | State for the People | 914 | 3.89 | | |
| P'aat'a Zakaradze | Free Democrats | 763 | 3.25 | | |
| Merab Abashidze | National Forum | 637 | 2.71 | | |
| Ushangi Tsetskhladze | Georgian Labour Party | 570 | 2.42 | | |
| Bidzina Dumbadze | Serve Georgia | 522 | 2.22 | | |
| Iamze Shavadze | Industrialists–Our Fatherland | 343 | 1.46 | | |
| Giorgi Rukhadze | Republicans | 182 | 0.77 | | |
| Roman Surmanidze | United Georgia | 93 | 0.40 | | |
| Durmishkhan Shainidze | Our People, People's Party | 70 | 0.30 | | |
| Total | | 23,506 | 100.00 | 18,050 | 100.00 |
| Valid votes | | 23,506 | 94.29 | | |
| Invalid/blank votes | | 1,423 | 5.71 | | |
| Total votes | | 24,929 | 100.00 | | |
| Registered voters/turnout | | 48,109 | 51.82 | | |

District Nº73 Khulo
| Candidate | Party | First round | | Second round | |
| Candidate | Party | Votes | % | Votes | % |
|---|---|---|---|---|---|
| Khvicha Sharashidze | Georgian Dream – Democratic Georgia | 14,160 | 46.05 | 17,303 | 71.44 |
| Nugzari Amaghlobeli | United National Movement | 8,294 | 26.98 | 6,919 | 28.56 |
| Mamuk'a Ghorjomeladze | Democratic Movement | 2,606 | 8.48 | | |
| Otar Tsetskhladze | Free Democrats | 1,867 | 6.07 | | |
| Davit Gatenadze | State for the People | 1,198 | 3.90 | | |
| Guram Surmanidze | Alliance of Patriots | 751 | 2.44 | | |
| Demur Msakhuradze | Republicans | 635 | 2.07 | | |
| Nugzar Zosidze | National Forum | 410 | 1.33 | | |
| Nino Surmanidze | Georgian Labour Party | 386 | 1.26 | | |
| Malkhaz Khimshiashvili | Serve Georgia | 349 | 1.14 | | |
| Elguja Shavadze | United Georgia | 90 | 0.29 | | |
| Total | | 30,746 | 100.00 | 24,222 | 100.00 |
| Valid votes | | 30,746 | 95.60 | | |
| Invalid/blank votes | | 1,414 | 4.40 | | |
| Total votes | | 32,160 | 100.00 | | |
| Registered voters/turnout | | 52,115 | 61.71 | | |
