= Archil Khabadze =

Georgian businessman and politician

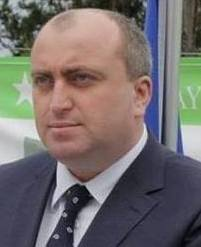
- Archil Khabadze in February 2016

3rd Chairman of the Government of Adjara
- In office 30 October 2012 – 15 July 2016
- President: Mikheil Saakashvili; Giorgi Margvelashvili
- Prime Minister: Bidzina Ivanishvili; Irakli Garibashvili; Giorgi Kvirikashvili
- Preceded by: Levan Varshalomidze
- Succeeded by: Zurab Pataridze

Personal details
- Born: March 18, 1980 (age 46) Batumi, Georgian SSR
- Education: Batumi State University; Agrarian University of Georgia
- Occupation: Politician

Archil Khabadze (Georgian: არჩილ ხაბაძე; born March 11, 1980) is a Georgian business executive and politician. He was the Head of the Government of the Autonomous Republic of Adjara from October 30, 2012 until his resignation in July 2016.

== Career ==
Born in Batumi, Khabadze was trained in banking and finance at the Batumi State University and Tbilisi-based Agrarian University of Georgia. He was then employed at the Cartu Bank owned by the billionaire Bidzina Ivanishvili in 2006 and became the head of the bank's Batumi branch office in 2008. After Ivanishvili became the Prime Minister of Georgia following his Georgian Dream coalition's victory in the October 1, 2012 parliamentary election, Khabadze was named as his favorite candidate for the regional leadership in Adjara and formally nominated by the President of Georgia Mikheil Saakashvili. On October 30, 2012, the Georgian Dream-dominated Supreme Council of Adjara elected him as the head of the Government of Adjara, replacing Levan Varshalomidze, who had run this Black Sea province since 2004.

Khabadze announced his resignation in July 2016, citing need to "renew and further strengthen" the ruling party in Adjara. He was succeeded, on July 16, 2016, by Zurab Pataridze.
