= Mikheil Makharadze =

Georgian politician (born 1946)

Chairman of the Supreme Council of Adjara
- In office July 20, 2004 – October 28, 2012
- Preceded by: Aslan Abashidze
- Succeeded by: Avtandil Beridze

Personal details
- Born: November 13, 1946 (age 79) Batumi, Adjara
- Party: United National Movement
- Education: Tbilisi State University
- Occupation: Politician, historian of philosophy
- Website: www.sca.ge

Mikheil Makharadze (Georgian: მიხეილ მახარაძე) (November 13, 1946) is a Georgian politician and historian of philosophy, who was the Chairman of the Supreme Council of the Autonomous Republic of Adjara from July 20, 2004, to October 28, 2012.

== Education and academic career ==
Born in a teacher's family in the Khulo district, Adjara, an autonomous republic of then-Soviet Georgia, Makharadze graduated from the Tbilisi State University with a degree in philosophy in 1970. Since then he has been working for the Tbilisi-based Institute of Philosophy, now part of the Ilia State University. In 2000, he became a professor at the Tbilisi State University. He has published several works on the history of philosophy, particularly focusing on the Areopagite, medieval Georgian, and Renaissance philosophy. From 1986 to 2010, Makharadze oversaw the publication of a 4-volume history of the Georgian philosophical thought, for which he received the National Prize of Georgia (2011).

== Political career ==
Makharadze was a regular contributor to the Georgian political press since the 1990s. In 2003, shortly after the Rose Revolution in Georgia, he co-founded and co-chaired the political movement chveni adjara ("Our Adjara"), which opposed the regime of the Adjarian strongman Aslan Abashidze. In February 2004 he became a member of the Parliament of Georgia and in June he was elected to the Supreme Council of Adjara, a regional legislature reelected after Abashidze's resignation. Makharadze was elected a chairman of the Supreme Council on July 20, 2004. He was the only candidate for this position as the other one, also a member of the anti-Abashidze movement, Koba Khabazi, had earlier withdrawn his nomination. He was reelected to this position on December 2, 2008. After the October 1, 2012 election, he was succeeded by Avtandil Beridze on October 28, 2012. Makharadze himself was elected to the Parliament of Georgia on a United National Movement ticket.

== Personal life ==
Makharadze is married, with 4 children and 6 grandchildren. He has received several civil and academic awards, including the State Prize of Georgia (2004), Order of Honor of Georgia (2004), Order of Vakhtang Gorgasali, 1st Rank (2007), Shalva Nutsubidze Prize (2009), and Presidential Order of Excellence (2012).
