= Law enforcement in Adjara =

Law enforcement in an autonomous region of Georgia

Law enforcement in the Autonomous Republic of Adjara, an autonomous republic of Georgia, is the responsibility of the Adjara Regional Police, who are headquartered in the capital of Batumi in new premises opened by the President Mikheil Saakashvili. They are responsible for policing a population of around 370,000 over an area of 2,900 km^{2}.

== Organization ==
The Adjara Regional Police is made up of a number of different task forces, including traffic police, patrol police and a Special Unit. The six districts of Adjara each have their own local police divisions:

1. City of Batumi
2. District of Keda
3. District of Kobuleti
4. District of Khelvachauri
5. District of Shuakhevi
6. District of Khulo

Adjara is only the 5th region in Georgia to be outfitted with a patrol police operator 002 to coordinate police communications, which is done from the capital Batumi.

== Reform and international involvement ==
On June 10, 2005, the European Commission, Regional Center of Human Rights Protection, and Association ALPE unveiled a new initiative known as "Improved Law-enforcement system and rights-protected citizens" designed to improve the policing and courts systems in Adjara. Of the Adjara Regional Police, the president stated at the opening of the new headquarters on 24 June 2006: "Two years ago when we together brought freedom to Adjara it was just unreal to believe such incredible changes. The fact is that we together have managed to form the most effective, well-equipped, and motivated police in Europe! We shall begin preparations for tourist season all over Georgia. We believe to keep peace and stability especially here, in Adjara as we expect more tourists than ever". The Adjara Regional Police are involved in a number of cross border training schemes, particularly with neighboring Turkey

The Organization for Security and Co-operation in Europe (OSCE) has also undertaken to set up five-day training programs in counter-terrorism for Adjara law enforcement officers as part of the OSCE Mission to Georgia. The OSCE's mission to reduce human trafficking in Georgia also involved the law enforcement agencies of Adjara in "a pilot project in the region of Ajara to strengthen co-operation between the local authorities and NGOs in identifying and referring victims of trafficking." Further reforms were promised by President Mikheil Saakashvili at the one-year anniversary of the Batumi Patrol Police: "It is not essential that you are wearing a new uniform, and driving new vehicles, and earning higher salaries, but the most important is the fact that ninety per cent of our population positively estimates the patrol police. That is a physiological and cultural revolution! We shall care and keep honoured the reputation. We will do more, rise salaries for 10 per cent, add more new vehicles, reconstruct and decorate police premises. But, it is prior that you should stand at the top". Along with 300 promotions and 1000 honourable diplomas, the police department awarded cars as gifts to four officers, including the head of the Batumi Patrol Police John Bakuridze, and two officers were each given two room flats.
