= Tornike Rizhvadze =

Georgian businessman and politician

Tornike Rijvadze
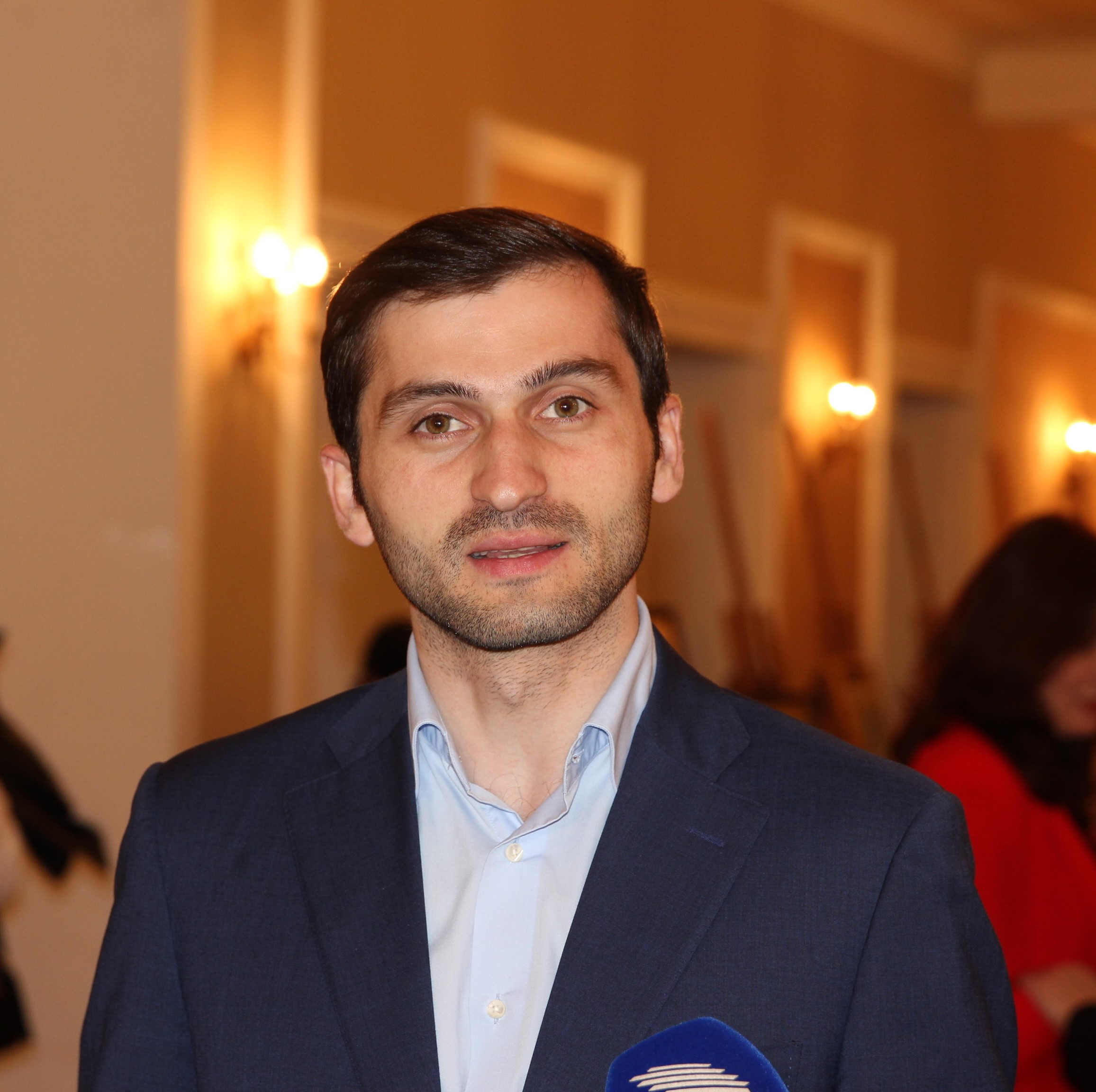
- Rijvadze in 2018

5th Chairman of the Government of Adjara
- In office 21 July 2018 – 4 April 2025
- President: Giorgi Margvelashvili; Salome Zourabichvili; Mikheil Kavelashvili
- Prime Minister: Mamuka Bakhtadze; Giorgi Gakharia; Maya Tskitishvili (acting); Irakli Garibashvili; Irakli Kobakhidze
- Preceded by: Zurab Pataradze
- Succeeded by: Sulkhan Tamazashvili

Personal details
- Born: March 25, 1989 (age 37) Khulo, Adjarian ASSR, Georgian SSR, Soviet Union
- Education: Tbilisi State University (BA); Batumi Shota Rustaveli State University (MIB); City, University of London (LLM)

Tornike Rijvadze (Georgian: თორნიკე რიჟვაძე; also transliterated as Rizhvadze; born 25 March 1989) is a Georgian politician and a former business executive.

From 21 July 2018 to 4 April 2025, he served as Chairman of the Government of the Autonomous Republic of Ajara. Rijvadze was nominated by the ruling Georgian Dream-Democratic Georgia party. As the youngest chairman in the history of Ajara Autonomous Republic, his nomination was approved by the 21-member legislature of Ajara. He had previously served as a deputy Minister of Energy of Georgia (2017) and, afterward as a director of a state-owned JSC "Georgian Energy Development Fund".

== Education and early career ==
Born in the town of Khulo, Rijvadze graduated from the Tbilisi State University with a degree in law in 2011. He holds MIB from Batumi State University (2014), LL.M from the City, University of London (2013). Before taking up the public duties, he held the Legal Director and General Counsel position at the biggest hydropower project development in Georgia worth US$500 million. He has also held management-level positions in venture-backed start-up, intergovernmental and development organizations.

== Chairman of the Government of Adjara ==
Rijvadze led the region through three elections (presidential, parliamentary and municipal) resulting in the victory of the Georgian Dream party.

Tornike Rijvadze increased sponsorship of social programs for those dealing with health issues. Thus providing citizens of the region with extra funding and support for their medical expenses. The most outstanding example of solving social issues includes an unprecedented decision – to build houses for families living in a life-threatening environment in a self-made settlement, where more than 1000 children do not have proper living conditions.

Rijvadze supports economic diversification. In the past two years, 2 industrial zones have been established in 2 different municipalities. First Zone has already attracted 16 investment projects within a year. Totally, the zone will create 1500 jobs and will attract around 75 million GEL private investments, while the second Industrial Zone will create around 1000 jobs and 40 million GEL investments.

Significant efforts have been also made to diversify one of the leading sectors in the Ajara Region - Tourism. The policy is focused on creating all possibilities for developing Sports tourism, MICE tourism, Eco end Ethno tourism.

In parallel with these developments, Ajara Autonomous Republic continued to pursue international recognition, including the awards of Europe's Leading Emerging Tourism Destination and the European City of Sport. The region hosted the President of the European Council Donald Tusk, held the NATO and PABSEC events, as well as Chess Olympiad and European Weightlifting Championship.

Оn 4 April 2025, Rijvadze announced his resignation without citing any reason. Shortly, some high-ranking officials of Ajara, including the mayors of Batumi and Kobuleti and the GD chairman of Kobuleti municipal assembly, followed suit.

== Shooting in Sagarejo ==
On 7 July 2025, while in Sagarejo, Rijvadze was wounded in the chest from a gunshot and taken to a nearby hospital unconscious. He was transported to a Tbilisi clinic several hours later, followed by an air transportation to Istanbul in the early hours of 9 July. Police reported that it was a suicide attempt.

== Family ==
Father, Davit Rijvadze, was a member of law enforcement agency in Adjara, working as Head of Khulo, Shuakhevi and Khelvachauri police district departments. By July 2018, when his son was appointed as Head of the Government, he was Chief of Detective branch within the Ajara police.

In 2014, prosecutors opened an investigation into abuse of power against Davit Rijvadze and another policeman accused of distorting statistic data of crimes. Although both of them pleaded guilty, shortly they were appointed to other positions.

Tornike Rijvadze is married with two children. His wife, Magda Mamuladze, worked in No 8 public school of Batumi as an English teacher.
