= Zurab Pataradze =

Georgian diplomat and politician

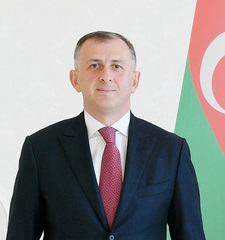
- Pataradze in 2018

4th & 7th Chairman of the Government of Adjara
- Incumbent
- Assumed office 28 April 2026
- President: Mikheil Kavelashvili
- Prime Minister: Irakli Kobakhidze
- Preceded by: Sulkhan Tamazashvili
- In office 15 July 2016 – 21 July 2018
- President: Giorgi Margvelashvili
- Prime Minister: Giorgi Kvirikashvili; Mamuka Bakhtadze
- Preceded by: Archil Khabadze
- Succeeded by: Tornike Rizhvadze

Personal details
- Born: 12 February 1973 (age 53) Batumi, Adjar ASSR, Georgian SSR
- Education: Tbilisi State University; Batumi State University

Zurab Pataradze (Georgian: ზურაბ პატარაძე; born 12 February 1973) is a Georgian diplomat and government official who has served as the Chairman of the Government of the Autonomous Republic of Adjara since 28 April 2026, having previously held the position between 15 July 2016 and 21 July 2018.

== Education and diplomatic career ==
Born in Batumi, Pataradze graduated from the Tbilisi State University with a degree in economics in 1994 and the Batumi State University with a degree in law in 2007. After working for a Batumi-based bank office in the mid-1990s, Pataradze joined the state service in 1996, first at an anti-organized crime unit of the Ministry of Internal Affairs of Adjara and then the Ministry of Foreign Affairs of Georgia in 2000. In 2004 Pataradze became a second secretary at the Georgian embassy to Russia in charge of consular service; after Georgia and Russia cut direct diplomatic relations in 2008, Pataradze served as a consular officer at the Georgian interests section at the Swiss embassy in Moscow until 2009. Pataradze was then Georgia's consul general in the northern Greek city of Thessaloniki from 2009 to 2010, consul general to Istanbul from 2011 to 2012, ambassador to Turkey from 2012 to 2013, and ambassador to Kazakhstan from 2013 to 2016.

== Government of Adjara ==
In July 2016, Zurab Pataradze was nominated by President of Georgia Giorgi Margvelashvili as the head of the government of Adjara, an autonomous region on the Black Sea coast, after the incumbent Archil Khabadze announced his resignation just three months before the scheduled elections. Pataridze narrowly won a confidence vote in the region's legislature on 15 July 2016. He resigned on 4 July 2018 and was replaced by Tornike Rizhvadze on 21 July.
