= 2020 Adjaran legislative election =

← 2016	31 October 2020 (first round); 21 November 2020 (second round)	2024 →
- 21 seats in the Supreme Council of Adjara; 11 seats needed for a majority
Party	Leader	Vote %	Seats	+/–
Georgian Dream		45.86	14	0
Strength is in Unity		33.96	7	+2
This lists parties that won seats. See the complete results below.

Legislative elections were held in Adjara, an autonomous republic within Georgia, on 31 October 2020. Adjara elected its 21-member parliament, Supreme Council, in the region's 8th local legislative election since Georgia declared independence from the Soviet Union in 1991.

== Background ==
The election was held simultaneously with the nationwide parliamentary election. The 21-member Supreme Council of Adjara is elected for a 4-year term. 3 of its members are elected in single-member constituencies and the remaining 18 seats are filled through proportional representation from parties which clear a 5% threshold.

== Results ==
Party	Proportional			Constituency (first round)			Constituency (second round)			Total seats
Party	Votes	%	Seats	Votes	%	Seats	Votes	%	Seats	Total seats
Georgian Dream – Democratic Georgia	82,700	45.86	11	82,549	46.36	1	62,782	88.61	2	14
Strength is in Unity	61,242	33.96	7	60,861	34.18	0	8,071	11.39	0	7
Strategy Aghmashenebeli	5,982	3.32	0	4,201	2.36	0				0
Alliance of Patriots of Georgia	5,923	3.28	0	6,049	3.40	0				0
Lelo for Georgia	5,495	3.05	0	6,144	3.45	0				0
European Georgia — Movement for Liberty	5,146	2.85	0	6,064	3.41	0				0
Girchi	3,004	1.67	0							0
Democratic Movement – United Georgia	1,876	1.04	0	1,821	1.02	0				0
Citizens	1,459	0.81	0	1,439	0.81	0				0
Solidarity Alliance of Georgia	1,457	0.81	0	2,530	1.42	0				0
Georgian Labour Party	1,325	0.73	0	944	0.53	0				0
Georgian Idea	939	0.52	0	879	0.49	0				0
Georgian March	556	0.31	0	989	0.56	0				0
Free Georgia	509	0.28	0	530	0.30	0				0
Face+	437	0.24	0	593	0.33	0				0
Tribuna – Christian Democratic Movement	423	0.23	0	419	0.24	0				0
Georgian Choice	401	0.22	0	623	0.35	0				0
Conservative Party of Georgia	386	0.21	0	409	0.23	0				0
Winner, Georgia	365	0.20	0	407	0.23	0				0
For Social Justice	288	0.16	0	208	0.12	0				0
For Justice	234	0.13	0	395	0.22	0				0
Tavisupleba	183	0.10	0							0
Total	180,330	100.00	18	178,054	100.00	1	70,853	100.00	2	21
Valid votes	180,330	96.51		178,054	95.29					
Invalid/blank votes	6,518	3.49		8,794	4.71					
Total votes	186,848	100.00		186,848	100.00					
Registered voters/turnout	314,889	59.34		314,889	59.34		243,892	–		

=== By constituency ===
District Nº 28
Candidate	Party	First round		Second round	
Candidate	Party	Votes	%	Votes	%
T'it'e Aroshidze	Georgian Dream – Democratic Georgia	32,332	41.89	30,169	88.00
Giorgi K'irtadze	Strength is in Unity	26,599	34.46	4,115	12.00
Genadi Tebidze	Lelo for Georgia	3,282	4.25		
Beka Diasamidze	Strategy Aghmashenebeli	2,860	3.71		
Vakht'ang K'aloiani	European Georgia — Movement for Liberty	2,705	3.50		
Jumber T'ak'idze	Alliance of Patriots of Georgia	2,171	2.81		
Giorgi Masalk'ini	Citizens	1,439	1.86		
Gocha Gugunava	Solidarity Alliance of Georgia	1,272	1.65		
Giorgi Tsintskiladze	Democratic Movement – United Georgia	1,222	1.58		
Mariami Gurgenidze	Georgian Labour Party	573	0.74		
Irak'li Tsetskhladze	Georgian Idea	487	0.63		
Vladimer Urushadze	Conservative Party of Georgia	409	0.53		
Mikheil Makharadze	Georgian March	383	0.50		
Sulik'o Mikeladze	Free Georgia	348	0.45		
K'akhaber Sirabidze	Winner, Georgia	270	0.35		
Ruslan Saladze	Georgian Choice	220	0.29		
Tengiz Rukhadze	Face+	216	0.28		
Mirian P'ap'unidze	For Justice	211	0.27		
Shalva Maghradze	Tribuna – Christian Democratic Movement	192	0.25		
Total		77,191	100.00	34,284	100.00
Valid votes		77,191	94.88		
Invalid/blank votes		4,167	5.12		
Total votes		81,358	100.00		
Registered voters/turnout		147,292	55.24	147,211	–

District Nº 29
Candidate	Party	Votes	%
Tsot'ne Ananidze	Georgian Dream – Democratic Georgia	20,809	50.05
Elguja Bagrat'ioni	Strength is in Unity	15,218	36.60
Gulnara Basiladze	Alliance of Patriots of Georgia	1,367	3.29
Zurab Goliadze	Lelo for Georgia	817	1.97
Revaz Jalaghania	European Georgia — Movement for Liberty	734	1.77
Imeda Tkhilaishvili	Democratic Movement – United Georgia	599	1.44
Lasha Verulidze	Solidarity Alliance of Georgia	576	1.39
Giorgi Erkomaishvili	Georgian Idea	392	0.94
Gia Gogit'idze	Georgian March	306	0.74
Malkhaz Khabazi	For Social Justice	208	0.50
Ednar Bagrat'ioni	Face+	208	0.50
K'akha Tsetskhladze	For Justice	184	0.44
Mukhran Mgeladze	Georgian Choice	156	0.38
Total		41,574	100.00
Valid votes		41,574	95.85
Invalid/blank votes		1,801	4.15
Total votes		43,375	100.00
Registered voters/turnout		70,837	61.23

District Nº 30
Candidate	Party	First round		Second round	
Candidate	Party	Votes	%	Votes	%
Pridon Put'k'aradze	Georgian Dream – Democratic Georgia	29,408	49.60	32,613	89.18
Gia Abuladze	Strength is in Unity	19,044	32.12	3,956	10.82
Temur K'akhidze	European Georgia — Movement for Liberty	2,625	4.43		
Davit Davitadze	Alliance of Patriots of Georgia	2,511	4.24		
Merab Abashidze	Lelo for Georgia	2,045	3.45		
Gizo Gorgiladze	Strategy Aghmashenebeli	1,341	2.26		
Anzhela Verdzadze	Solidarity Alliance of Georgia	682	1.15		
Ushangi Tsetskhladze	Georgian Labour Party	371	0.63		
Avtandil Diasamidze	Georgian March	300	0.51		
Marad Abuladze	Georgian Choice	247	0.42		
Zaza T'arieladze	Tribuna – Christian Democratic Movement	227	0.38		
Bahadur Rizhvadze	Free Georgia	182	0.31		
P'aat'a Shavadze	Face+	169	0.29		
Aslan Vashaq'madze	Winner, Georgia	137	0.23		
Total		59,289	100.00	36,569	100.00
Valid votes		59,289	95.45		
Invalid/blank votes		2,826	4.55		
Total votes		62,115	100.00		
Registered voters/turnout		96,760	64.19	96,681	–
