= Roman Dumbadze =

Georgian general (1964–2012)

Roman Dumbadze (Georgian: რომან დუმბაძე; Russian: Роман Нодарович Думбадзе, Roman Nodarovich Dumbadze; 17 March 1964 – 21 May 2012) was a Georgian military commander, who led a mutiny during the 2004 crisis in Adjara. From 2008, he resided in Russia, where he was shot dead in 2012.

== Biography ==
Born in Pushrukauli, Adzhar ASSR, Georgian SSR, Dumbadze graduated from the artillery college in Tbilisi in 1987. After the collapse of the Soviet Union, he joined the ranks of the Ministry of Defense of Georgia in the early 1990s. In 1998, he was promoted to the rank of major-general by the decree of the President of Georgia, Eduard Shevardnadze.

Since the early 1990s, was the commander of the 25th Motorized Rifle Brigade, Georgian Defense Ministry, based in Batumi, the capital of the Autonomous Republic of Adjara. He was in that post in April 2004, when the dispute between the Georgian central government of Mikheil Saakashvili and the long-time Adjarian leader Aslan Abashidze escalated into a crisis, taking on the characteristics of a military conflict. Dumbadze was accused of insubordination and dismissed from military by the Georgian government on 3 April 2004.

He refused to comply and openly mutinied on 19 April 2004, pledging his support to Abashidze. His troops soon defected him, sneaking into Tbilisi. On May 6, 2004, after Abashidze had resigned and fled to Russia, Dumbadze surrendered to the Georgian authorities. In 2006, he was sentenced to 17 years in prison.

In August 2008, during the war between Georgia and Russia, Dumbadze was handed over to the Russians in exchange for the release of twelve Georgian military servicemen detained by the Russian forces in Poti. According to the Georgian negotiator Givi Targamadze, the Russian commander Major-General Vyacheslav Borisov explained his interest in this deal by personal ties with Dumbadze. From that time on, until his assassination, he lived in Russia, where he was granted citizenship by President Dmitry Medvedev in 2010.

== Death ==
Dumbadze was shot dead close to his apartment in Moscow on 21 May 2012. According to preliminary police reports, the assailants rode a motorcycle, which was later found abandoned several kilometers from the scene of the murder. He was 48 years old. The suspected killers, of Georgian origin and linked with gambling businesses, were arrested by the police in Moscow in July 2012. One of them, Gocha Kvirikashvili, was sentenced to 14 years in prison in April 2014.

In April 2016, the Georgian prosecutor's office charged the former police official Megis Kardava of "ordering" Dumbadze's assassination through a "middleman". Kardava's defense lawyer accused the authorities of building the case solely upon information and evidence obtained from the Russian side and of acting upon the Russian interests.
