= Aslan-Beg Abashidze =

Muslim Georgian nobleman and general

- Born: 1877; Batumi, Democratic Republic of Georgia
- Died: 1924 (aged 46–47); Constantinople, Ottoman Empire
- Occupations: Nobleman and General

Aslan-Beg Abashidze (Georgian: ასლან-ბეგ აბაშიძე; 1877–1924) was a Muslim Georgian nobleman and general in the service of the Democratic Republic of Georgia. Like his brother Memed Abashidze, he was one of the principal champions of pro-Georgian orientation in the largely Muslim region of Adjara, heavily contested during and immediately after World War I. After Soviet takeover of Georgia in 1921, Abashidze fled to Turkey, where he died in unclear circumstances.

== Biography ==
Born in Batumi, Aslan-Beg Abashidze was a member of the Muslim branch of the Georgian noble family of Abashidze, hailing from Adjara. The family continued to be held in high esteem even after the Russian acquisition of the area from its previous overlord, the Ottoman Empire, in 1878. The Abashidze family were proponents of the reintegration of the Muslim Georgian community of Adjara into the Georgian society.

Aslan-Beg and his elder brother Memed-Beg were involved in the revolutionary turmoil that stuck at the Russian Empire in 1905. Aslan-Beg commanded one of the armed detachments of revolutionaries and left for the Ottoman Empire after the failure of the uprising in 1907. He received military training at Constantinople and returned to Georgia after the ouster of the Russian monarchy in the 1917 revolution. During this period of turmoil, Abashidze fought for the integration of Adjara into a newly independent Georgia and formed a legion of Muslim Georgians, which fought against the Armenian forces in December 1918. He is credited with having written a military song "Aslanuri", popular at that time. He was awarded the rank of general and continued his service in the Georgian ranks until the overthrow of the Georgian republic by the Soviet Russian Red Army in February–March 1921. Abashidze fled to Turkey, where he died (allegedly poisoned to death) in Constantinople in 1924.
