= List of Georgian regions by GDP =

This is a list of Georgian administrative divisions (mkhare) by GDP as of 2022. This also includes Adjara, a historical, geographic and political-administrative region of Georgia, and Tbilisi, the capital and largest city. There is no data for the Autonomous Republic of Abkhazia available.

List of Georgian regions by GDP
| Rank | Region | GDP (bil. of GEL ₾) | GDP (bil. of US$) | % of nationwide GDP |
|---|---|---|---|---|
| | Georgia | 63.396 | 21.815 | 100 |
| 1 | Tbilisi | 32.171 | 11.070 | 50.75 |
| 2 | Adjara | 5.990 | 2.061 | 9.45 |
| 3 | Imereti | 5.704 | 1.963 | 9.00 |
| 4 | Kvemo Kartli | 5.486 | 1.888 | 8.65 |
| 5 | Samegrelo-Zemo Svaneti | 3.331 | 1.146 | 5.25 |
| 6 | Kakheti | 3.230 | 1.111 | 5.09 |
| 7 | Shida Kartli | 2.546 | 0.876 | 4.02 |
| 8 | Samtshe-Javakheti | 1.898 | 0.653 | 3.00 |
| 9 | Mtskheta-Mtianeti | 1.582 | 0.544 | 2.50 |
| 10 | Guria | 1.072 | 0.369 | 1.69 |
| 11 | Racha-Lechkhumi and Kvemo Svaneti | 0.382 | 0.131 | 0.60 |

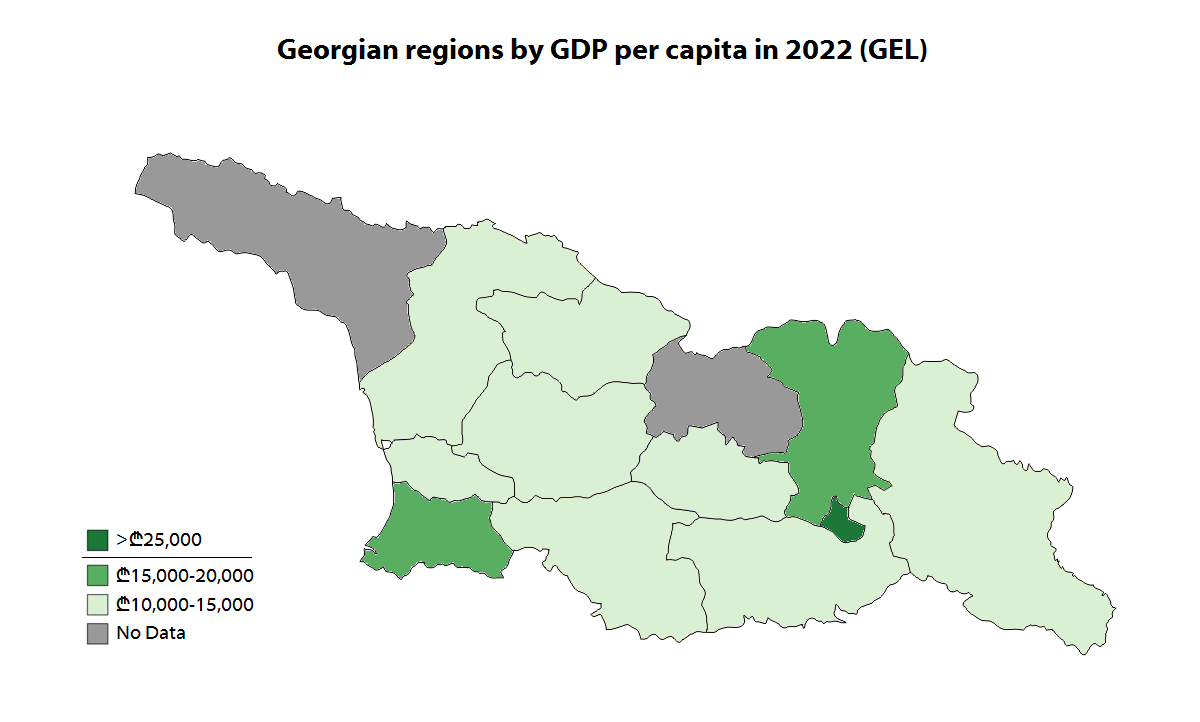
Georgian regions by GDP per capita in 2022 (GEL)

List of Georgian regions by GDP per capita
| Rank | Region | GDP per capita (GEL ₾ ) | GDP per capita (US$) | % of nationwide average |
|---|---|---|---|---|
| | Georgia | 17,187 | 5,914 | 100 |
| 1 | Tbilisi | 26,769 | 9,211 | 155.75 |
| 2 | Mtskheta-Mtianeti | 17,129 | 5,894 | 99.69 |
| 3 | Adjara | 16,851 | 5,798 | 98.05 |
| 4 | Racha-Lechkhumi and Kvemo Svaneti | 13,840 | 4,762 | 80.53 |
| 5 | Samtskhe-Javakheti | 12,802 | 4,405 | 74.49 |
| 6 | Kvemo Kartli | 12,627 | 4,345 | 73.47 |
| 7 | Imereti | 12,225 | 4,207 | 71.13 |
| 8 | Samegrelo-Zemo Svaneti | 11,060 | 3,806 | 64.35 |
| 9 | Kakheti | 10,594 | 3,645 | 61.64 |
| 10 | Guria | 10,180 | 3,503 | 59.23 |
| 11 | Shida Kartli | 10,166 | 3,498 | 59.15 |
