= Shuakhevi Municipality =

Coordinates: 41°38′N 42°11′E

Shuakhevi Municipality შუახევის მუნიციპალიტეტი
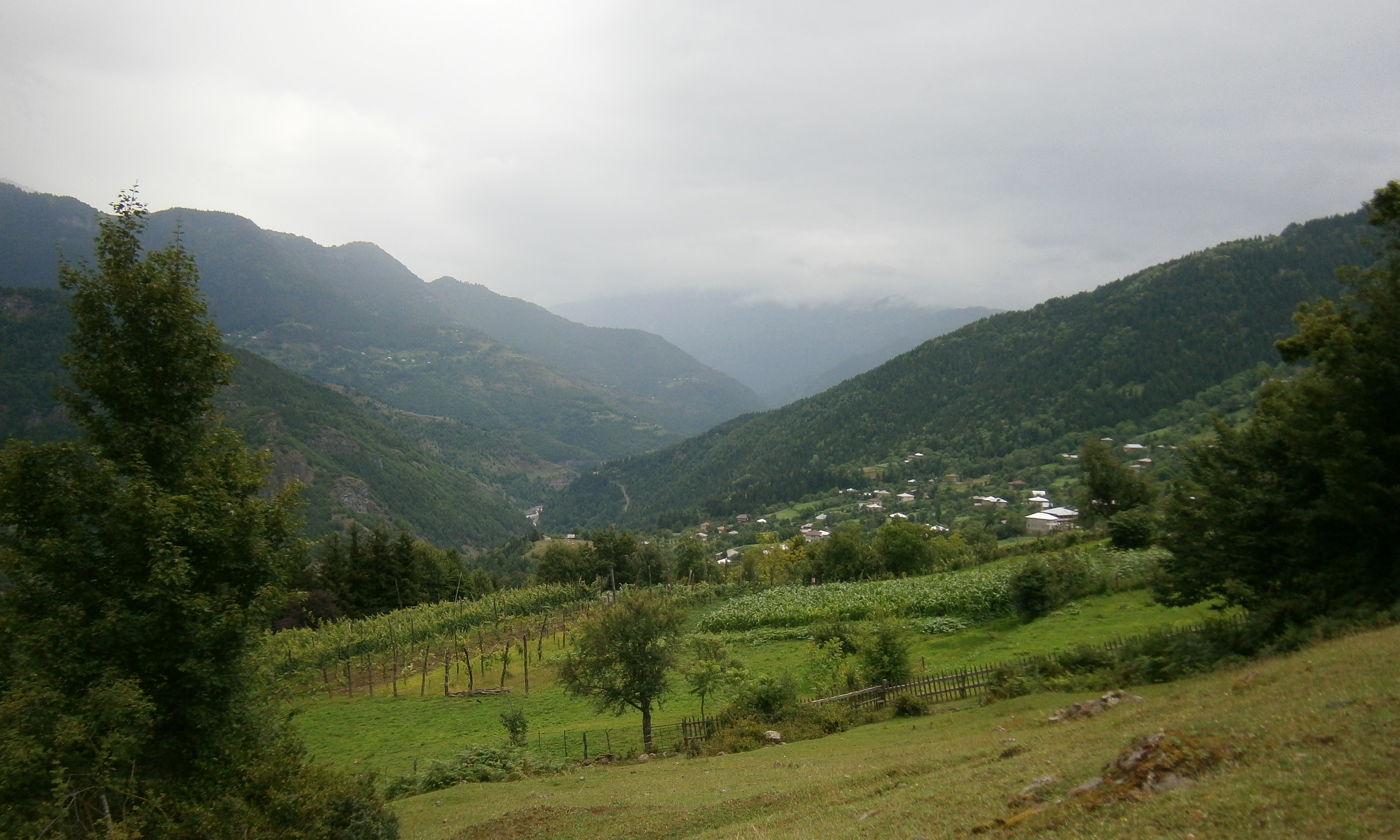
- Village of Nenia

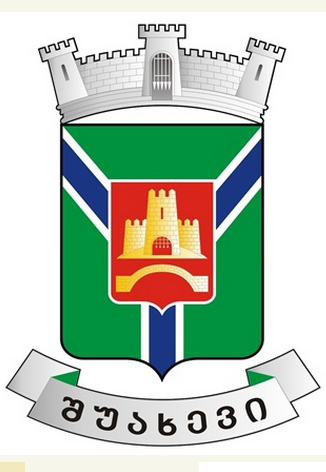
- Flag Seal

- Country: Georgia
- Autonomous Republic: Adjara
- Administrative centre: Shuakhevi

Government
  - mayor: Omar Takidze (GD)

Area
  - Total: 588 km^{2} (227 sq mi)

Population (2024)
  - Total: 11,104
  - Density: 25.6/km^{2} (66/sq mi)
- Time zone: UTC+4 (Georgian Time)
- Website: https://shuakhevi.gov.ge/

Shuakhevi (Georgian: შუახევის მუნიციპალიტეტი) is a district of Georgia, in the autonomous republic of Adjara. Its main town is Shuakhevi.

Area: 588 km^{2}

== Politics ==
Shuakhevi Municipal Assembly (Georgian: შუახევის საკრებულო, Shuakhevi Sakrebulo) is a representative body in Shuakhevi Municipality, consisting of 21 members which are elected every four years. The last election was held in October 2021. Omar Takidze of Georgian Dream was elected mayor.

| Party | 2017 | 2021 | Current Municipal Assembly |
|---|---|---|---|
| Georgian Dream | 19 | 12 | |
| United National Movement | 3 | 5 | |
| People's Power | | 2 (Note: Split from Georgian Dream.) | |
| For Georgia | | 1 | |
| Lelo | | 1 | |
| Alliance of Patriots | 1 | | |
| European Georgia | 1 | | |
| Total | 24 | 21 | |

== Subdivision ==
| Rank | Administrative unit | Population |
|---|---|---|
| 1 | Chvana | 2,051 |
| 2 | Zamleti | 2,019 |
| 3 | Shuakhevi | 1,740 |
| 4 | Uchambi | 1,275 |
| 5 | Oladauri | 892 |
| 6 | Dghvani | 817 |
| 7 | Shubani | 815 |
| 8 | Baratauli | 804 |
| 9 | Tskalsakari | 691 |

== See also ==
- List of municipalities in Georgia (country)
