= Avtandil Beridze =

Georgian politician (1955–2020)

Chairman of the Supreme Council of Adjara
- In office 28 October 2012 – 28 November 2016
- Preceded by: Mikheil Makharadze
- Succeeded by: Davit Gabaidze

Personal details
- Born: 11 January 1955 (age 71) Batumi, Adjara
- Party: Georgian Dream
- Occupation: Politician
- Website: www.sca.ge

Avef Beridze (Georgian: ავთანდილ ბერიძე; born 11 January 1955) is a Georgian politician. He was a chairman of the Supreme Council of the Autonomous Republic of Adjara from 28 October 2012 to 28 November 2016. Beridze is a native of Batumi. Formerly a member of the Republican Party of Georgia, he co-founded the public movement Serve to Georgia, in 2011, together with Murman Dumbadze, who had been dismissed from the Republican Party for his opposition to a planned Turkish-Georgian deal on rebuilding of an Ottoman-era mosque in Batumi. Both Dumbadze and Beridze then joined the Georgian Dream party founded by the tycoon Bidzina Ivanishvili to challenge Mikheil Saakashvili's United National Movement in the October 2012 parliamentary election. After the Georgian Dream's victory in both nationwide and regional legislative elections in his native Adjara, an autonomous entity on Georgia's Black Sea coast, Beridze was elected the chairman of the Supreme Council of Adjara, being the only candidate nominated for that position on 28 October 2012. His tenure expired in November 2016. Beridze then served in the administration of Adjara's government and the directorate of environmental protection of Adjara.
