= Memed Abashidze =

Georgian politician, writer, and Muslim community leader

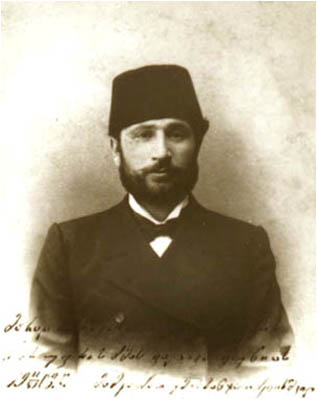
Memed Abashidze

Memed Abashidze (Georgian: მემედ აბაშიძე; January 18, 1873 – 1937) was a Georgian politician, writer and public benefactor. An eminent leader of Muslim Georgian community of Adjarians, he was a major proponent of pro-Georgian orientation in Adjara and one of the architects of the region's autonomy within Georgia. He became a victim of Joseph Stalin’s Great Purge.

== Biography ==
Abashidze was born into the powerful Muslim Georgian noble house of Abashidze, rulers of Adjara for the Ottoman Empire. He was a brother of general Aslan-Beg Abashidze.

After Adjara was absorbed into Imperial Russia in 1878, Georgian intellectuals launched a campaign aimed at reincorporation of local Muslim Georgian community into the Georgian society. Mehmed’s father, Prince Ibrahim Abashidze, sided with this movement and helped open a Georgian school in Batumi in 1883. Born in Turkish-dominated Batumi, Mehmed attended this school. At the same time, he received a traditional education at home. Fluent in several languages, he began translating Arabic, Persian, and Turkish works into Georgian and authored the first Georgian textbook on the Arabic language and the first Turkish translation of the well-known medieval Georgian epic The Knight in the Panther's Skin by Shota Rustaveli (the manuscript of this translation was lost in the 1930s). Plays by Abashidze’s were also performed in the recently opened Batumi Drama Theatre.

During the Russian Revolution of 1905, he became involved in the political life of Georgia. His brother, Aslan-Beg Abashidze, was a commander of one of the revolutionary detachments. From 1904 to 1908, he was a member of the Socialist Federalist Party of Georgia and advocated pro-Georgian orientation among the Adjarian Muslims. In 1908, the Russian persecutions forced him to flee to the Ottoman Empire where he was arrested. Back in Adjara in 1913, he was imprisoned by the Tsarist police and eventually exiled to Siberia. Prohibited from returning to Batumi, he stayed in Tbilisi after his release and led the Committee of Georgian Muslims for the Batumi District. Russia’s February Revolution of 1917 enabled to him to return to his native Adjara, where his Committee quickly turned into opposition to resurgent pan-Tukist movement and attempted to bring Christian and Muslim Georgians together.

In November 1917, he was elected to the National Council of Georgia. During the Turkish occupation of Batumi in 1918, he stayed in the region and was arrested for his criticism of the Turkish authorities. He escaped from the Trebizond prison later that year and welcomed the declaration of the independent Democratic Republic of Georgia in May 1918. When the British took control of Batumi from the Ottomans in December 1918, Abashidze returned to the city and organized the Congress of the People of Adjara which campaigned against the British installed government headed by the Russian Cadet Maslov. The movement forced the British military administration to organize local parliamentary elections on August 31 1919. Abashidze became chairman of the newly elected Mejlis (National Assembly) which was soon to become a scene of heated struggle between pro-Georgian and Turkophile factions. Abashidze renewed his campaign calling for the incorporation of Adjara into Georgia with an autonomous status and criticizing the Allies’ attempts to turn Batumi into a free port. Upon the evacuation of the British, Georgian army entered Batumi on July 8 1920, but the question of Adjara’s autonomy remained still open.

When Soviet Russia’s Red Army occupied Georgia in February–March 1921, Abashizde resigned his position in the Mejlis and chose a policy of reconciliation with the newly established Bolshevik regime. He became a member of the Revolutionary Committee of the Batumi district and took part in drafting the first constitution of the Adjar ASSR. Although the Soviet authorities were suspicious of Abashidze, he was still well treated and received a pension thanks probably to his erstwhile ties with Joseph Stalin who worked in Batumi in the early 1900s. In 1935, he became the head of the Adjarian section of the Writers’ Union of Georgia. During the Great Purges, however, he was arrested on trumped-up charges of treason and executed in 1937. His family members were also repressed. Abashidze was rehabilitated only in 1957.

His grandson, Aslan Abashidze, became an authoritarian ruler of Adjara in the 1990s and was ousted in 2004 shortly after the Rose Revolution in Georgia.
