= Chairman of the Government of Adjara =

Georgian government official

Chairman of the Government of the Autonomous Republic of Ajara აჭარის ავტონომიური რესპუბლიკის მთავრობის თავმჯდომარე
- Coat of arms of the Autonomous Republic of Adjara

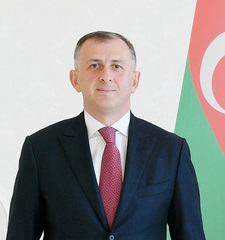
- Incumbent; Zurab Pataradze since 28 April 2026
- Residence: Government building Batumi
- Appointer: Supreme Council of the Autonomous Republic of Adjara
- Inaugural holder: Aslan Abashidze
- Formation: 1991
- Website: Official website

The Chairman of the Government of Ajara Autonomous Republic (Georgian: აჭარის ავტონომიური რესპუბლიკის მთავრობის თავმჯდომარე, romanized: ach’aris avt’onomiuri resp’ublik’is mtavrobis tavmjdomare) is the head of the government of the autonomous republic of Adjara. The post was created in 1991.

== Chairmen of the Government ==
#	Name	Image	Took office	Left office	Duration	Political party
1	Aslan Abashidze		18 August 1991	5 May 2004	12 years, 261 days	Democratic Union for Revival
2	Levan Varshalomidze		20 July 2004	30 October 2012	8 years, 102 days	United National Movement
3	Archil Khabadze		30 October 2012	15 July 2016	3 years, 259 days	Georgian Dream
4	Zurab Pataradze		15 July 2016	21 July 2018	2 years, 6 days	Unknown
5	Tornike Rizhvadze		21 July 2018	4 April 2025	6 years, 257 days	Georgian Dream
6	Sulkhan Tamazashvili		7 April 2025	28 April 2026	1 year, 21 days	Georgian Dream
7	Zurab Pataradze		28 April 2026	Incumbent	132 days	Unknown
