= Merisi Mining District =

The Merisi Mining District is situated in Adjara region in close vicinity to the Georgian-Turkish border. It is the part of Lesser Caucasus which occurs in the hinterland of the Arabia-Eurasia collision zone, in the broad Alpine-Himalayan orogenic belt. Area of the mining district is about 180 km^{2}.

== Minerals ==
The district contains several copper-polymetallic, copper-porphyry and stratified sulphuric pyrite deposits and ore manifestations. Some of deposits of the Merisi mining district is represented mainly with chalcopyrite and with subordinate lead-zinc deposits with minor copper. The second order minerals are marcasite, hematite, malachite, azurite, native gold, and silver. The modern exploration data demonstrate commercial gold presence in quartz-sericite-chlorite and quartz-alunite rocks in close vicinity to the hydrothermal polymetallic veins. The central part of the mining district is occupied by outcrops of the Merisi-Namonastrevi-Chalati subalkaline diorite-syenite-monzonite complex, which is surrounded by huge halos of gold-bearing hydrothermally altered rocks.
