= Levan Varshalomidze =

Georgian politician (born 1972)

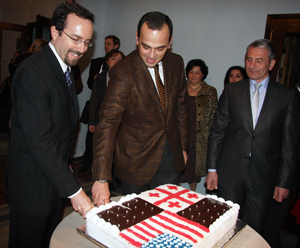
- Levan Varshalomidze (center) with the United States ambassador John Bass in 2009

2nd Chairman of the Government of Adjara
- In office 20 July 2004 – 30 October 2012
- President: Mikheil Saakashvili; Nino Burjanadze (acting); Mikheil Saakashvili
- Prime Minister: Zurab Zhvania; Mikheil Saakashvili (acting); Zurab Nogaideli; Giorgi Baramidze (acting); Lado Gurgenidze; Grigol Mgaloblishvili; Nika Gilauri; Vano Merabishvili; Bidzina Ivanishvili
- Preceded by: Aslan Abashidze
- Succeeded by: Archil Khabadze

Member of the Parliament of Georgia
- In office 11 December 2020 – 6 September 2022

Personal details
- Born: 17 January 1972 (age 54) Batumi, Adjara
- Party: United National Movement
- Education: Kyiv State University (PhD, LL.M.)
- Occupation: Politician
- Website: www.lv.ge

Levan Varshalomidze (Georgian: ლევან ვარშალომიძე) (born 17 January 1972) is a Georgian politician and the Chairman of the Government of the Autonomous Republic of Adjara from 2004 to 2012. He assumed office on 20 July 2004, following the resignation of Aslan Abashidze—who had run the region in defiance to the central government of Georgia—during the 2004 Adjara crisis.

In 2025, Varshalomidze was detained in Kazakhstan, presumably on the request of Russia.

== Education and early career ==
Varshalomidze was born in Batumi. He graduated with a degree in law in 1994 from the Kiev State University, where he befriended a fellow Georgian student, Mikheil Saakashvili. He obtained a PhD from the same institution in 1999 and joined the ranks of the Ministry of Foreign Affairs of Georgia. In 2000, when Saakashvili was the minister of justice of Georgia, he appointed Varshalomidze to head one of its bureaus. After a brief service with the Ministry of Finance of Georgia in 2002, he retired to a private sector. After Georgia's November 2003 Rose Revolution, which brought Saakashvili to power, Varshalomidze was appointed Director of the Georgian Railways in January 2004.

== Government of Adjara ==
Varshalomidze returned to politics following the departure of Aslan Abashidze, a longtime Adjara strongman, who resigned following a showdown with Saakashvili's government on 6 May 2004. His family has been associated with the region's politics since the 1990s. His father, Guram Varshalomidze (died 2020), an erstwhile ally of Abashidze, chaired the Supreme Council of Adjara in the mid-1990s, later headed the region's statistics office and would lead the Georgian Oil Corporation from July 2004 to 2005.

After Abashidze's ouster, Levan Varshalomidze was appointed by Saakashvili as a chairman of a special twenty-member Presidential Interim Council charged with handling the transition. On 20 July 2004, Varshalomidze was approved by the Supreme Council of Adjara as the chairman of the republic's government.

Varshalomidze has been seen as a close ally of President Saakashvili and a member of the young reformist team which came into the Georgian politics after the 2003 Rose Revolution. Critics have accused him of amassing personal wealth, pressuring the media, and nepotism.

During his tenure, Varshalomidze became a key figure behind the massive redevelopment of Adjara and particularly its capital, Batumi. He has stated he is trying to develop it, beyond being a summer tourist center, into an international financial hub.

In April 2010, Varshalomidze publicly accused Nika Gilauri, Prime Minister of Georgia, and the central government, of ignoring his requests for delegating "technical functions" to the local authorities in Adjara. Following a meeting with the members of the central government in Tbilisi, Varshalomidze said the differences were resolved.

On 14 January 2012, Varshalomidze was awarded by President Saakashvili the Presidential Order of Excellence for his contributions to the efforts that led to release of Georgian sailors from captivity of Somali pirates.

On 30 October 2012, following the defeat of Saakashvili-led United National Movement party in the nationwide and regional legislative elections in favor of the opposition Bidzina Ivanishvili – Georgian Dream coalition, the Supreme Council of Adjara elected Archil Khabadze, a candidate nominated by Georgia's new Prime Minister Bidzina Ivanishvili, as the new head of Adjara's government. Varshalomidze became the leader of a regional cell of the now-opposition United National Movement party.

== Post-2012 ==
After his retirement from government, Levan Varshalomidze founded the LVP Project Management and Consulting company. In 2015, Varshalomidze became an adviser to the Ukrainian President Petro Poroshenko and led a team of Georgian experts, aiming at facilitating reforms in Ukraine. He returned to Adjara in July 2016 and launched a campaign for the upcoming regional and national legislative elections scheduled for October 8.

On March 18, 2025, Varshalomidze was detained in Kazakhstan, while crossing the border. According to Unity – National Movement representative Levan Bezhashvili, Varshalomidze now faces "a risk of extradition" to Russia, as he was indicted in the country before for political consulting with the Government of Ukraine.
