= 2004 Adjara crisis =

2004 political crisis in Adjara, Georgia

- Part of the aftermath of the Rose Revolution
Date	November 23, 2003 – July 20, 2004
Location	Adjara, Georgia
Result	Government forces victory: Aslan Abashidze flees to Russia

Belligerents
(Georgia (country)) Government forces of Georgia: Internal Troops of Georgia; National Guard of Georgia; (Adjara) Anti-Abashidze protesters	Adjara administration: State Security of Adjara; Pro-Abashidze forces and protesters; Democratic Union for Revival

Commanders and leaders
(Georgia (country)) Mamuka Kiladze	(Adjara) Aslan Abashidze

The Adjara crisis (Georgian: აჭარის კრიზისი, romanized: ach'aris k'rizisi), also known as the Adjarian Revolution or the Second Rose Revolution, was a political crisis in Georgia's Adjaran Autonomous Republic, then led by Aslan Abashidze, who refused to obey the central authorities after President Eduard Shevardnadze's ouster during the Rose Revolution of November 2003. The crisis threatened to develop into military confrontation as both sides mobilized their forces at the internal border. However, Georgia's post-revolutionary government of President Mikheil Saakashvili managed to avoid bloodshed and with the help of Adjaran opposition reasserted its supremacy. Abashidze left the region in exile in May 2004 and was succeeded by Levan Varshalomidze.

== Tensions ==
Adjaran leader Aslan Abashidze, being in strong opposition to the Rose Revolution, declared a state of emergency immediately after Eduard Shevardnadze's ousting on November 23, 2003. (Note: International Crisis Group, 2004, page 6.) Following negotiations with central authorities, the state of emergency was temporarily canceled on January 3, 2004, just one day before the presidential election. The state of emergency was renewed on January 7 and was followed by the crackdown of an oppositional demonstration. On January 19, dozens were injured as a result of clashes between protesters and police in the southern Adjaran village of Gonio. The protesters demanded the resignation of Aslan Abashidze. In the wake of Abashidze's visit to Moscow, the Russian Foreign Ministry issued a statement on January 20 backing Abashidze's policy and condemning his opposition as "extremist forces". In late January, Georgian officials, including Acting President Nino Burjanadze and President-elect Mikheil Saakashvili, met with Abashidze in Batumi.

On February 20, the opposition movement's offices were again raided after the opposition had staged a protest rally in Batumi. Clashes between supporters of and opposition to Abashidze also took place in Kobuleti. These protests coincided with the visit of the Secretary General of the Council of Europe (CoE) Walter Schwimmer in Batumi, who held talks with Abashidze. President Saakashvili demanded Adjaran leadership abolish the Autonomous Republic's Security Ministry, which was Abashidze's main weapon of repression.

== At the Choloki Bridge ==
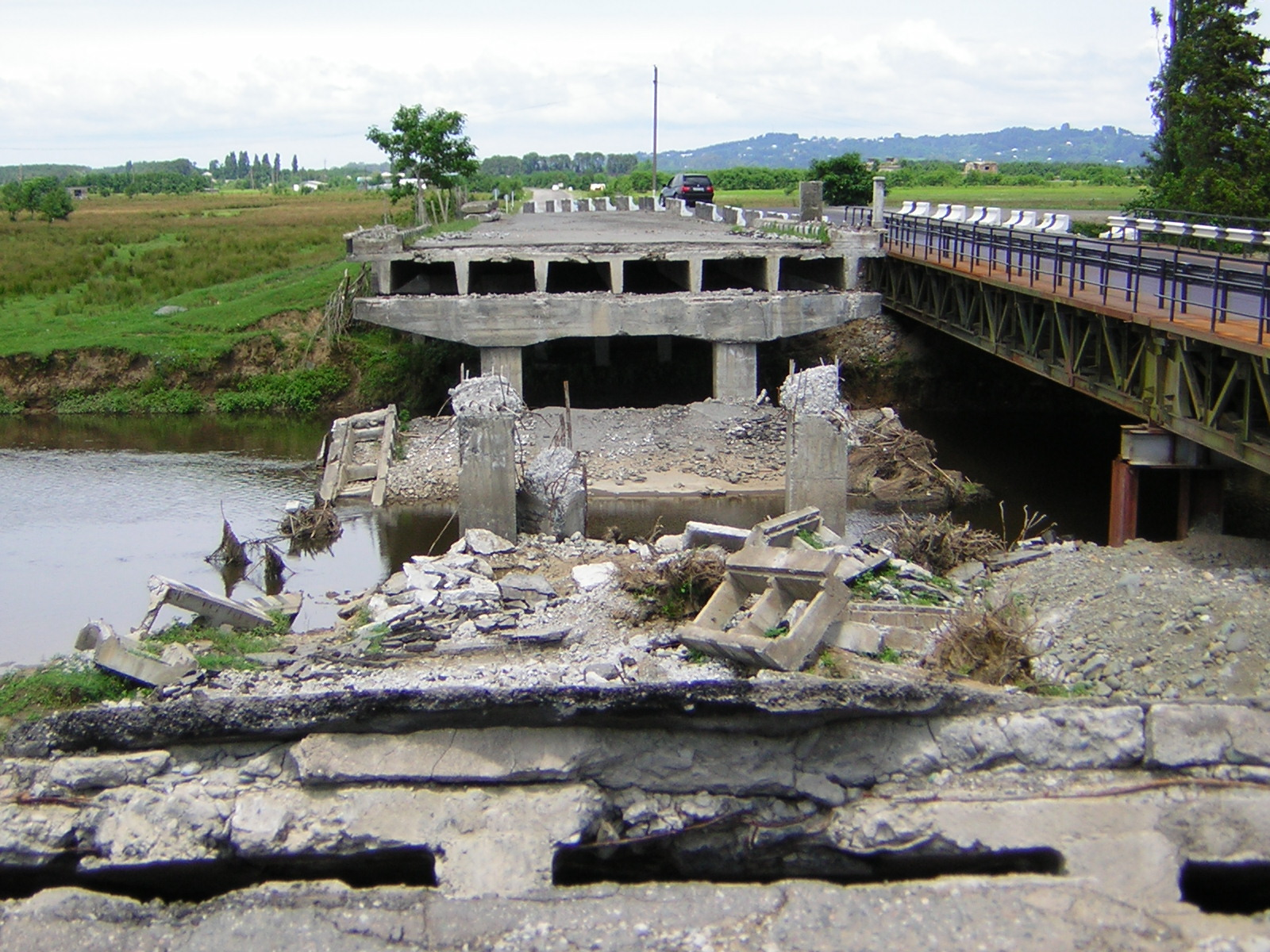
Destroyed bridge over Choloki (May 2004)

The situation escalated on March 14, when the central Georgian officials took advantage of Abashidze's being in Moscow and headed to Adjara to campaign for the parliamentary elections scheduled for March 28. However, pro-Abashidze armed groups blocked the administrative border of Adjara at the Choloki River and prevented President Mikheil Saakashvili and other members of the government from traveling to the Autonomous Republic. The Adjaran authorities claimed Saakashvili was going to take control over the region by force by staging a coup.

In retaliation, Georgia's central authorities imposed partial economic sanctions against its defiant region in a bid "to exhaust Adjaran regime's resources". Tensions defused between Tbilisi and Batumi on March 18 after President Saakashvili and Aslan Abashidze met and struck a deal that allowed for economic sanctions on Adjara to be lifted. (Note: International Crisis Group, 2004, page 7.) An agreement was reached over disarmament of paramilitary forces in Adjara, release of political prisoners, joint control of the customs and port of Batumi, and providing conditions for free election campaigning in Adjara. However, Abashidze refused to disarm his paramilitary forces in April. On April 19 and April 21 respectively, Batumi-based military commanders Major General Roman Dumbadze and Murad Tsintsadze officially announced their insubordination to central authorities' orders. On April 24, the Adjaran Senate approved Aslan Abashidze's proposal to impose a curfew in the region. According to the Georgian government, dozens of soldiers of Abashidze's elite special purpose unit began to leave the region and pledged loyalty to the country's central authorities. Several Adjaran officials followed. Local opposition resumed the series of protests in Batumi, which were broken up severely on April 30.

At the end of April, Georgia launched its largest ever military exercises at the Kulevi training ground, near the Black Sea town of Poti. The large-scale war games, some 30 km away from Adjara's administrative border, were a show of strength, amid the confrontation between the central authorities and the Adjaran leader. In retaliation, the two key bridges connecting Adjara with the rest of Georgia over the Choloki River were blown up by Abashidze's forces to prevent an incursion into Adjara allegedly planned by the country's central authorities. On May 3, the U.S. Department of State condemned Abashidze's actions, accusing him of "trying to provoke a military crisis", and called him to disarm.

== Adjara's revolution ==
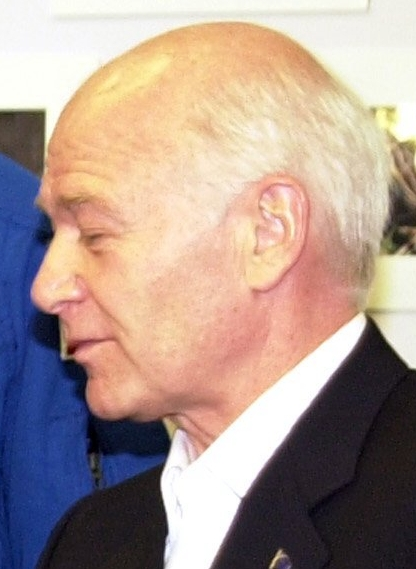
Leader Aslan Abashidze (1991–2004)

On May 4, a large opposition protest rally was attacked by the local security forces in Batumi. Dozens of protesters were reportedly injured. However, the violent break up of peaceful demonstration proved a catalyst for even larger protests later on the same day. Tens of thousands from all Adjara headed to Batumi demanding Abashidze's resignation. Georgian Prime Minister Zurab Zhvania and Interior Minister Giorgi Baramidze crossed the Choloki River on May 5 and held talks with Adjaran Interior Minister Jemal Gogitidze. The latter agreed to withdraw his forces and paramilitary groups from the administrative border provided he would be guaranteed security. Abashidze's position became untenable when local protesters took control of the central part of the city of Batumi and Georgian special forces entered the region and started to disarm pro-Abashizde militants. Later on the same day, Secretary of the Russian Security Council Igor Ivanov arrived in Batumi. Abashidze stepped down after overnight talks with Ivanov and left for Moscow.

Saakashvili left for Adjara shortly after Aslan Abashidze's departure and met at dawn of May 6 with celebrating Adjarans in Batumi. "Aslan has fled, Adjara is free", President Saakashvili said on St George's Day and congratulated Georgians with what he described as "a second bloodless revolution" in Georgia. President Saakashvili also said that Abashidze's resignation "will pave the way for Georgia's prosperity" and that "it will be the beginning of Georgia's territorial integrity".

On May 7, direct presidential rule was imposed in Adjara and a 20-member Interim Council was set up to run the Autonomous Republic before snap local elections would be held in the region. Levan Varshalomidze was appointed as the Chairman of the Government of the Autonomous Republic of Adjara. Regional parliamentary elections were held on June 20. Victorious Adjara, a party backed by President Saakashvili won 28 seats out of 30 in the local legislative body. The remaining two seats were occupied by Saakashvili's former allies, members of the Republican Party. There were allegations of vote-rigging from the Republicans, after they won less than 15 percent of the vote. (Note: International Crisis Group (2004), pp. 9–10.) On July 20, the Adjaran Supreme Council approved Levan Varshalomidze as the Chairman of the Autonomous Republic's Government. He would hold the position until 2012.

== See also ==
- History of Adjara
