= Aslan Abashidze =

Georgian politician; former leader of the Ajarian Autonomous Republic (born 1938)

- ასლან აბაშიძე
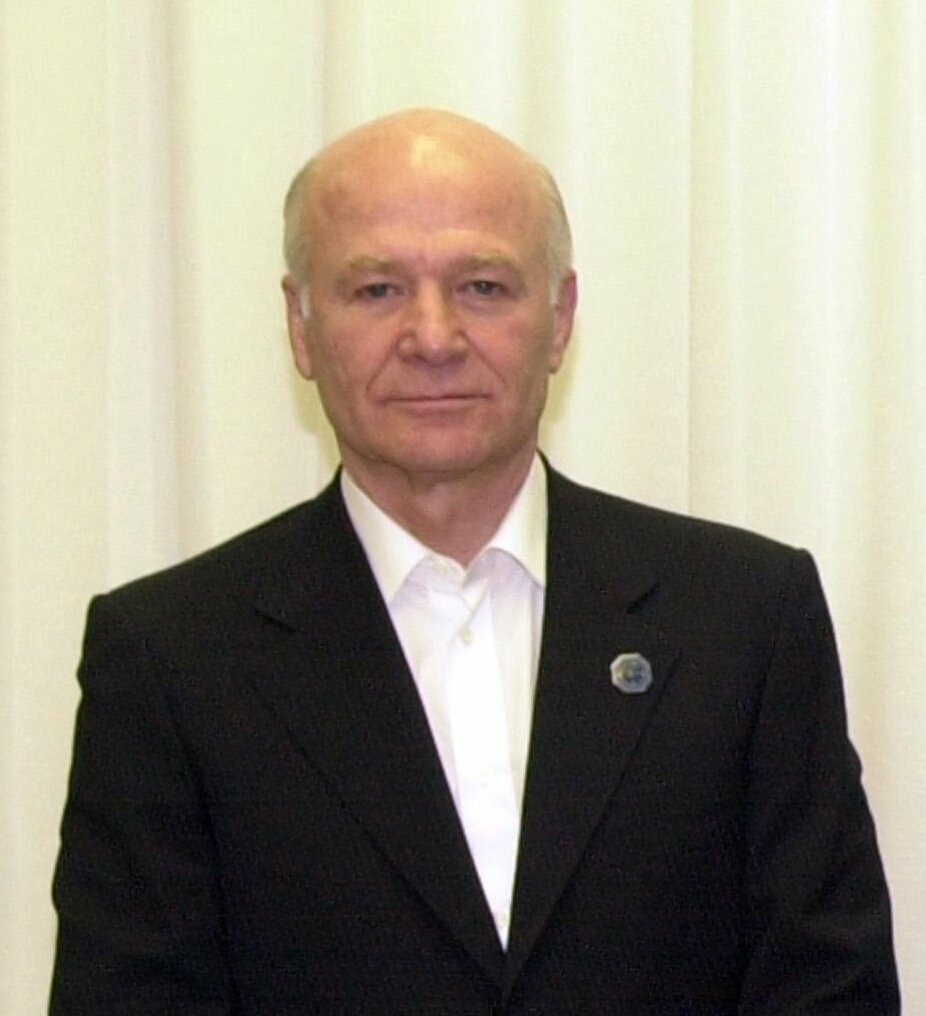
- Abashidze in 2002

1st Chairman of the Government of Adjara
- In office 18 August 1991 – 5 May 2004
- President: Zviad Gamsakhurdia; Eduard Shevardnadze; Nino Burjanadze (acting); Mikheil Saakashvili
- Prime Minister: Murman Omanidze (acting); Besarion Gugushvili; Tengiz Sigua; Eduard Shevardnadze (acting); Otar Patsatsia; Niko Lekishvili; Vazha Lortkipanidze; Giorgi Arsenishvili; Avtandil Jorbenadze; Zurab Zhvania
- Preceded by: Position Established
- Succeeded by: Levan Varshalomidze

Chairman of Supreme Council of the Autonomous Republic of Adjara
- In office 15 March 1991 – 2001
- Preceded by: Position established
- Succeeded by: Antaz Kikava

Chairman of Democratic Union for Revival
- In office 1992–2004
- Preceded by: Position established
- Succeeded by: Position abolished

Member of the Parliament of Georgia
- In office 4 November 1992 – 20 April 2000
- In office 10 August 1991 – 2 January 1992

Personal details
- Born: 20 July 1938 (age 88) Batumi, Adjar Autonomous Soviet Socialist Republic, Georgian SSR, Soviet Union
- Citizenship: Soviet (1938–1991); Georgian (1991–)
- Party: Round Table—Free Georgia (1990–1992); Democratic Union for Revival (1992–2004)
- Height: 167 cm (5 ft 6 in)
- Relations: Memed Abashidze (grandfather)

Aslan Abashidze (Georgian: ასლან აბაშიძე; born 20 July 1938) is the former leader of the Ajarian Autonomous Republic in western Georgia. He served in this capacity from 18 August 1991 to 5 May 2004. He resigned under the pressure of the central Georgian government and mass opposition rallies during the 2004 Adjara crisis, and has since lived in Moscow, Russia. On 22 January 2007, the Batumi city court found him guilty of misuse of office and embezzlement of GEL 98.2 million in state funds, and sentenced him to 15 years' imprisonment in absentia. He also faces a charge of murder of his former deputy, Nodar Imnadze, in 1991.

== Early life and career ==
Abashidze was born into a renowned Muslim Ajarian family, a branch of the Abashidze princely house. His grandfather Memed Abashidze was a famous writer and member of the Parliament of the Democratic Republic of Georgia between 1918 and 1921, but was shot on Joseph Stalin's orders in 1937. His father was sent to the Gulag for ten years but survived. Despite a difficult childhood, during the 1950s Abashidze was able to obtain degrees in history and philosophy at Batumi University and in economics at Tbilisi State University. He worked as a teacher and economist for a period before joining Georgia's regional public service. He was the director of several technical service institutes before being named a regional minister in Batumi, the capital of Ajaria, where he served as Minister of Community Service. He was later appointed the national First Deputy Minister of Community Service and moved to Tbilisi. This was, however, a relatively minor government post.

In spite of his descent from a renowned Muslim family that played a pivotal role in strengthening Georgian and Islamic identities among the Muslims of Ajaria, Aslan Abashidze converted to Christianity.

Abashidze is close to Grigory Luchansky, the owner of the Vienna, Austria based Nordex.

== Abashidze and independent Georgia ==
When Georgia regained its independence on 9 April 1991, Abashidze secured his appointment as Chairman of the Supreme Council of the Autonomous Republic of Ajaria. He was also appointed Deputy Chairman of the Parliament of Georgia, a post that he retained in 1990–1992 and 1992–1995. He built an independent power base in Ajaria by steering a course between the Tbilisi government and the opposition. He established his own army as a counterweight to the armed factions that supported and opposed President Zviad Gamsakhurdia. When civil war broke out between pro- and anti-Gamsakhurdia forces in the winter of 1991–92 and again in the autumn of 1993, he kept both sides out of Ajaria, ensuring that the fighting did not spread to the republic.

However, unlike the rulers of Abkhazia and South Ossetia, he did not attempt to seek independence for Ajaria and pursued what can best be described as a policy of "armed autonomy" after the fall of Gamsakhurdia. He effectively turned Ajaria into a "free economic zone" with few restrictions on trade but with the customs duties and revenues going to his government rather than to Tbilisi.

Abashidze attracted some criticism for his heavy-handed rule, which was often described as feudal. He established his own political party in 1992, known variously as the Union of Democratic Revival or the Union for Georgia's Rebirth. In 1998, he was elected President of Ajaria with 93% of the vote in what Russian observers regarded as a generally free and fair election.

He preferred to exercise influence from a distance, rather than attempting to bid for national power, and consistently adopted a policy of backing whoever seemed to offer the best deal for maintaining his rule over Ajaria. He reached an accommodation with President Eduard Shevardnadze, who appeared to have preferred to live with a semi-independent Ajaria rather than risk another civil war. His relations with Shevardnadze grew frosty at the end of the 1990s, as he and the government traded accusations of corruption and treason.

== Abashidze and the "Rose Revolution" ==
The forced resignation of Shevardnadze in November 2003 – widely dubbed the "Rose Revolution" – created a political crisis between Abashidze and the new government in Tbilisi. The Georgian opposition had strongly criticised Shevardnadze for failing to resolve the problem of separatism in the country, including what they saw as the lack of control which Tbilisi had over Ajaria. Not surprisingly, Abashidze saw this as a threat to his position and the continued semi-independence of Ajaria, and denounced the downfall of Shevardnadze as a "coup". He declared a state of emergency in Ajaria and sought Russian support in the event of an open conflict. However, he failed to attract much support from Russia and came under intense pressure from the United States to compromise. On 25 January 2004, Abashidze met the newly elected President Mikhail Saakashvili in Batumi and declared his intention to work with Saakashvili.

This relationship soon foundered after Saakashvili vowed to restore central authority over Georgia's separatist regions. In mid-March 2004, a motorcade carrying Saakashvili to planned political events in Ajaria ahead of the 28 March Georgian legislative elections was turned back by Ajarian border guards. Abashidze accused Saakashvili of leading a military convoy into the republic with the aim of overthrowing him, and declared a state of emergency in Ajaria and a mobilization of armed formations. In response, Saakashvili issued a one-day ultimatum to Abashidze to accept central authority and disband the Ajarian paramilitary forces. The government also closed transit routes into and out of Ajaria.

Amid high tension and widespread public demonstrations, foreign governments and international organisations appealed to both sides to exercise restraint and resolve their differences peacefully. Abashidze resigned as leader of Ajaria on 5 May 2004, when Special Forces entered the region and Adjarian paramilitary forces began to swap sides and disarm. The next day, after being granted assurances that he would not be extradited, Abashidze left for Moscow, without a shot being fired in the region.

Abashidze's property in Georgia, as well as that of his close relatives, was frozen by the Georgian courts and eventually transferred to the state's ownership. According to The New York Times, as of December 2012, Abashidze was living in Barvikha village in Odintsovsky District of Moscow Oblast.

In August 2016, the Batumi City Court sentenced Abashidze to a 15-year imprisonment in absentia for multiple charges, including misuse of office, embezzlement, organization of terrorist attacks in 2004 and the murder of his former deputy, Nodar Imnadze, on 30 April 1991.

== Family ==
Aslan Abashidze is a widower, having been married to Maguli Gogitidze, a musician, with whom he had two children: a son and daughter.

== See also ==
- Chairman of the Government of Adjara, first person to hold the position
