= Free Georgia =

Free Georgia თავისუფალი საქართველო
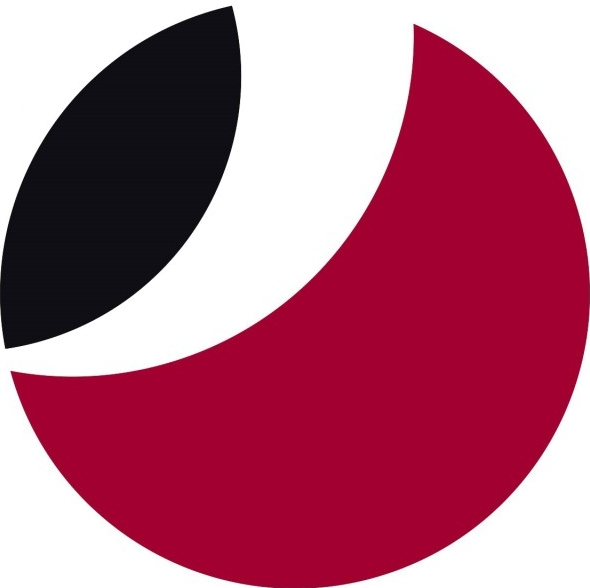
- Leader: Kakha Kukava
- Founded: 2010
- Split from: Conservative Party
- Headquarters: Otar Oniashvili st.80, Tbilisi
- Ideology: Conservatism; Zviadism
- Political position: Center-right
- Colors: Maroon; White
- Seats in Parliament: 0 / 150
- Municipal Councilors: 2 / 2,058

Website
- Official website

Free Georgia is a conservative political party in Georgia. The party was founded in the fall of 2010 after the local self-government elections.

== History ==
Political party Free Georgia was founded in 2010 by party’s current leader Kakha Kukava together with his fellows. It considers itself as an ideological heir of the electoral bloc Round Table-Free Georgia. The second congress of the party was held on 6 November 2012 in the city of Kutaisi.

== Elections ==
Free Georgia participated in the 2012 parliamentary elections, in which the party took 0.27% of votes. In a few months, in the mid-term elections Free Georgia candidate Kakha Kukava took the second place (17.26%) in the Nadzaladevi district; thus, the party lost to the Georgian Dream candidate (39.48%) and outpaced the United National Movement (former ruling party) candidate (15.11%).

In the 2013 presidential elections, Free Georgia did not have its presidential candidate.

The party chairman Kakha Kukava took part in the 2018 presidential elections and finished seventh with 1.33% of votes.

In the 2021 municipal elections, the Free Georgia candidate got 54.26% of votes in Lentekhi single mandate district and outpaced the Georgian Dream candidate (45.73%). The party received one seat in local municipal council.

In the 2025 municipal elections, the party received 4.07% in the Kazbegi Municipality and 4.35% in the Abasha Municipality, crossing the electoral threshold in these districts. The party received one seat in each of the municipal councils (two seats in total).

== Platform ==
The main trends of home policy in the party’s program are conduct of free and fair elections, restoration of justice, reforms of judiciary and self-government. The main areas of social policy are public service reform, state funding of health and education sectors, pension reform and implementation of demographic program. The party's economic program includes support of national production and peasants, as well as fight against monopolies. The party's foreign policy priorities are protection of Georgia’s identity, European integration and resolution of conflicts.

== Structure ==
The party’s supreme body is a congress. Between the congresses, the party is ruled by a seven-member political board, the members of which are: Kakha Kukava (Chairman), Alexandre Shalamberidze, Zaza Abashidze, Magda Gabrichidze, Tengiz Omanidze, Vladimer Bulbulashvili. The party has a youth organization.

== Seats in Municipal assemblies ==
Municipal Council	Seats	Status
Kazbegi	1 / 21	Opposition
Abasha	1 / 32	Opposition
