= Batumi Shota Rustaveli State University =

University in Batumi, Georgia

- ბათუმის შოთა რუსთაველის სახელმწიფო უნივერსიტეტი
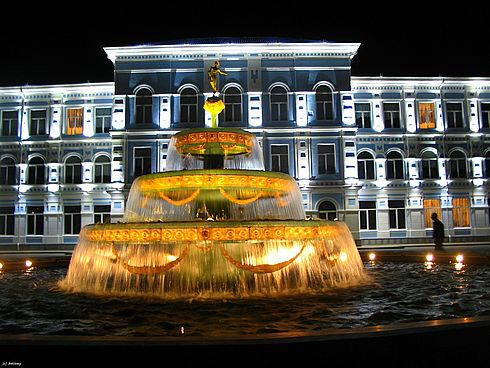
- Type: Public
- Established: 1895; 131 years ago (boys' gymnasium); 1923; 103 years ago (pedagogical university); 1990; 36 years ago (university)
- Rector: Tite Aroshidze
- Academic staff: 2000
- Students: 5,500
- Location: Batumi, Georgia; 41°38′59″N 41°37′37″E
- Campus: Urban
- Colours: Blue
- Nickname: BSU
- Website: www.bsu.edu.ge/en/

The Batumi Shota Rustaveli State University (Georgian: ბათუმის შოთა რუსთაველის სახელმწიფო უნივერსიტეტი) is a public university in Batumi, capital of the Autonomous Republic of Adjara, Georgia. It is named after the medieval Georgian poet Shota Rustaveli.

== History ==
The establishment and development of the educational system in Adjara was a long-time endeavor of the Georgian community. In 1893 the issue was raised to open a Boys’ Gymnasium in Batumi. On 26–27 June 1893 the Municipality of the city granted 2 623, 95 sq/m area of land for the Boys’ Gymnasium at the seaside. The project was designed by a military engineer Sedelnikov. The first floor of the building allocated a gym while the second floor contained the church, assembly hall, eight classrooms, art classroom, physics study-room, laboratory and a library. The Boys’ Gymnasium started functioning in July, 1897. On 26 September 1900 it became possible to open a Women's Gymnasium as well. Later, by 1923, a Pedagogical Institute was founded in the building of former Women's Gymnasium (present Public School No.2) which afterwards turned into a Pedagogical College. It used to prepare the first stage school teachers.

In the building of the Boys’ Gymnasium in 1935 a 2-year Teacher's Institute was opened with 4 faculties: Georgian Language and Literature, Physics and Mathematics, History, Natural Sciences and Geography. To this the faculty of Physical Education was added in 1936 and a faculty of Russian Language and Literature – in 1938. In 1938 the Institute was named after Shota Rustaveli. The first director of the Teachers’ Institute was Khusein Nakaidze. A significant assistance was rendered to the Institute in providing the scientific personnel by other higher educational institutions of Georgia, first and foremost – Tbilisi State University. The following outstanding representatives of the Georgian academia conducted fruitful activities within the walls of the Batumi Shota Rustaveli State University (that time Teachers’ Institute): Giorgi Akhvlediani, Giorgi Tsereteli, Iase Tsintsadze, Sargis Kakabadze, Simon Kaukhchishvili, Giorgi Tavzishvili, Razhden Khutsishvili, Dimitri Gedevanishvili, Giorgi Javakhishvili, Vukol Beridze, Shota Dzidziguri and others. It is owing to them as well that the newly established higher institution soon gained the reputation – a system of teaching and research activities was formed and the preparation of local academic staff took its beginnings – by 1943 there were 5 candidates of sciences at the Institute already.

In July 1935 the preparatory courses were created that particularly fostered the attraction of high school applicants from Adjara highlands. According to the statistics 600 school leavers submitted applications to the Institute in the first year; 219 applicants were admitted to the Institute.

In June 1945 a Pedagogical Institute was founded on the basis of Batumi Teachers’ Institute that was followed by reconstruction process and improvement of the facilities and equipment. In 1956 the renovated building entered into exploitation. However, it was not sufficient for the growth of the Institute and in 1977 the construction of a new 5-storeyed building began that was finished in 1982. The collapse of the Soviet Empire and Georgia's fight for independence made it possible to realize the wish of great Ivane Javakhishvili who said: “If there is to be another university in Georgia, it should be in Batumi.”

By the Decision No.453, 3 September 1990 of the Cabinet of Ministries of Georgia Batumi State University was established on the basis of Batumi Pedagogical Institute. After this transformation apart from special faculty chairs there began functioning 9 university chairs at the higher education institution. The number of specialties increased – the faculties of law, economics and medicine were created. As a result of the educational reform in the country the university was transferred to a two-cycle teaching: Bachelor and Master Levels were created. Post-graduate studies also were functioning for certain specialties.
