= Supreme Council of the Autonomous Republic of Adjara =

Local parliament in Adjara, Georgia

Supreme Council of the Autonomous Republic of Adjara აჭარის ავტონომიური რესპუბლიკის უმაღლესი საბჭო

Type
- Type: Unicameral

History
- Founded: 1991

Leadership
- Chairperson: Tsotne Ananidze

Structure
- Seats: 21
- Political groups: Government (13): Georgian Dream (13); Opposition (2): For Georgia (2); Vacant (6)

Elections
- Last election: 2020 Adjaran legislative election
- Next election: 2024 Adjaran legislative election

The Supreme Council of Autonomous Republic of Adjara is the supreme representative body of the Autonomous Republic of Adjara. The Supreme Council consists of members residing on the territory of the Autonomous Republic and is elected for four-year term. 15 members of Supreme Council are elected by the proportional electoral system and 6 deputies are elected by the majoritarian system. Georgian citizen from the age of 25 with a suffrage can become the member of Supreme Council.

== Chairmen ==
| Name | Period |
|---|---|
| Aslan Abashidze | March 15, 1991–2001 |
| Antaz Kikava | 2001–2004 |
| Aleksandre Gobronidze | 2001–2004 |
| Giorgi Tsintskiladze | 2004 |
| Levan Varshalomidze | March 15, 2004–July 20, 2004 |
| Mikheil Makharadze | July 20, 2004–October 28, 2012 |
| Avtandil Beridze | October 28, 2012–November 28, 2016 |
| Davit Gabaidze | November 28, 2016–April 2, 2026 |
| Tsotne Ananidze | April 2, 2026–Present |
