= Shuakhevi =

Shuakhevi შუახევი
- Borough
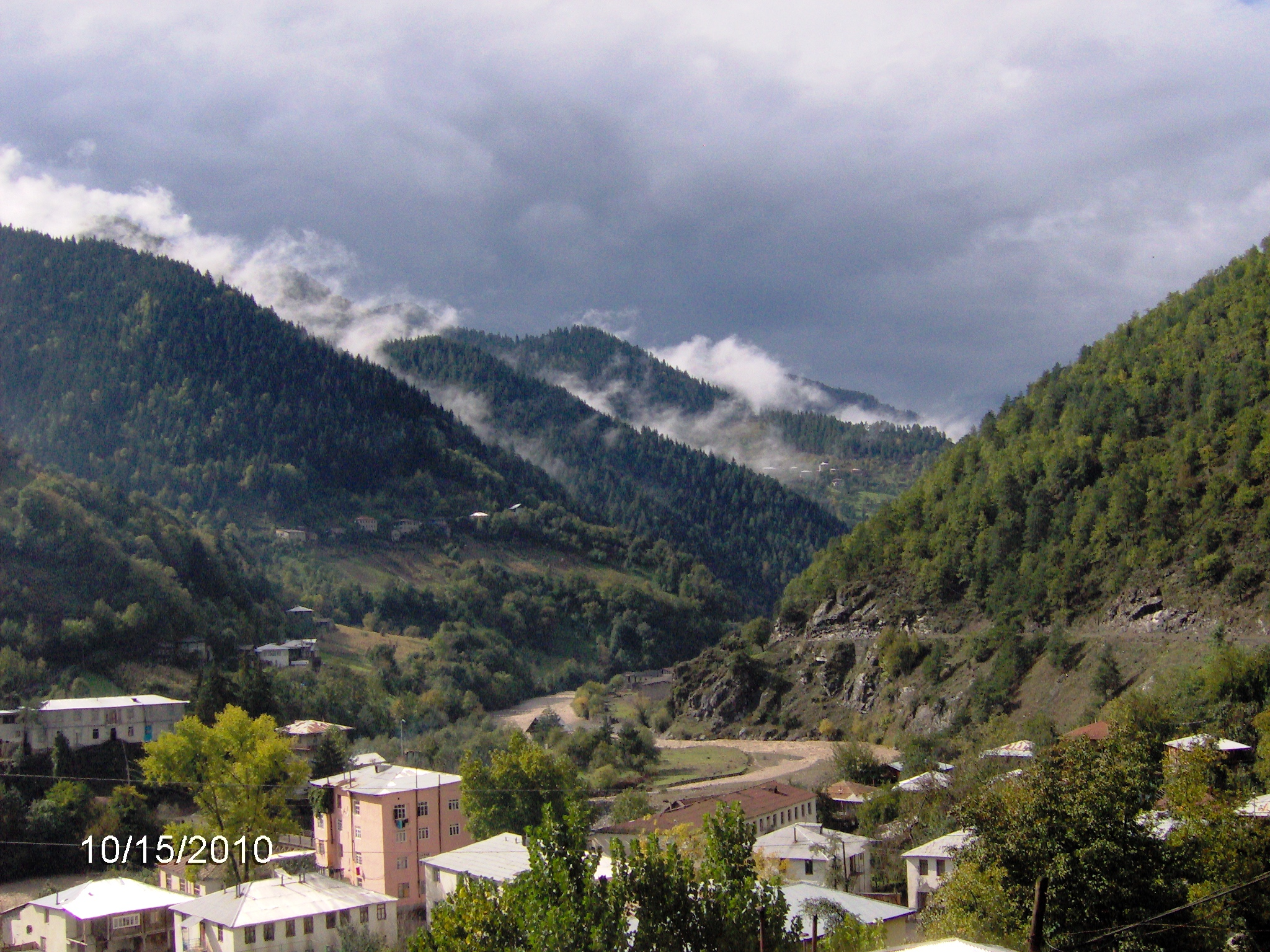

- Location within Georgia Location within Adjara
- Coordinates: 41°37′37″N 42°11′13″E
- Country: Georgia
- Autonomous Republic: Adjara

Population (2014)
  - Total: 797
- Time zone: UTC+4 (Georgian Time)

Shuakhevi (Georgian: შუახევი [ʃuaχevi]) is a small town in Georgia's Autonomous Republic of Adjara, 67 km east to the regional capital Batumi. Situated on the right bank of the Adjaristsqali River, it is an administrative center of Shuakhevi District, which comprises the town itself and 67 adjoining mountainous villages. The area of the district is 588 km^{2}; population – 15,044 (2014).

There is a plant to build Shuakhevi hydro power plant, a run-of-the-river plant with installed capacity of 185 MW with expected electricity output of 452 GWh. It is expected to be commissioned in 2016.

Near the town are the ruins of a medieval fortress.

== See also ==
- Adjara
- Subdivisions of Georgia
