= Adjara =

Region of Georgia

Adjara აჭარა (Georgian)
- Autonomous Republic
- Autonomous Republic of Adjara აჭარის ავტონომიური რესპუბლიკა (Georgian)
- Flag Coat of arms

- Sovereign state: (Georgia (country)) Georgia
- Part of unified Georgian Kingdom: 11th century
- Conquered by Ottoman Empire: 1614
- Ceded to Russian Empire: 1878
- Adjar ASSR: 1921
- Autonomous republic within Georgia: 1991
- Capital: Batumi; 41°39′N 42°0′E
- Official languages: Georgian
- Ethnic groups (2024): 91.3% Georgians; 2.6% Russians; 1.5% Armenians; 1.1% Ukrainians; 0.5% Belarusians; 3% others
- Religion (2024): 59.54% Orthodox Christianity; 33.85% Islam; 2.01% None; 0.18% Armenian Apostolic Church; 0.32% Other; 4.09% No answer/not specified
- Demonym(s): Adjarian
- Government: Devolved parliamentary autonomous republic
  - Chairman of the Government: Zurab Pataradze
- Legislature: Supreme Council

Area
  - Total: 2,880 km^{2} (1,110 sq mi)
  - Water (%): negligible

Population
  - 2024 census: 402,929
  - Density: 139.3/km^{2} (360.8/sq mi)
- GDP (nominal): 2024 estimate
  - Total: ₾7.516 billion (US$2.870 billion) · 2nd
  - Per capita: ₾18,653 (US$7,123) · 2nd
- HDI (2023): 0.849 very high
- Currency: Georgian lari (GEL)
- Time zone: UTC+4 (UTC)
  - Summer (DST): not observed

Adjara (Georgian: აჭარა Ach’ara [at͡ʃʼara]) or Achara, officially known as the Autonomous Republic of Adjara (Georgian: აჭარის ავტონომიური რესპუბლიკა Ach’aris Avt’onomiuri Resp’ublik’a [atʃʼaris avtʼonomiuri respʼublikʼa]), is a political-administrative region of Georgia. It is in the country's southwestern corner, on the coast of the Black Sea, near the foot of the Lesser Caucasus Mountains, north of Turkey. It is an important tourist destination and includes Georgia's second most populous city of Batumi as its capital. About 402,929 people live on its 2,880 km^{2} (1,110 sq mi).

Adjara is home to the Adjarians, a regional subgroup of Georgians. The name can be spelled in a number of ways: Ajara, Ajaria, Adjaria, Adzharia, Atchara and Achara. Under the Soviet Union, Adjara was part of the Georgian Soviet Socialist Republic as the Adjarian ASSR. The autonomous status of Adjara is guaranteed under article 6 of the Treaty of Kars.

== History ==
Adjara was a part of Georgian polities, Colchis and Caucasian Iberia, since ancient times. Colonized by Greeks in the 5th century BC, the region fell under Rome in the 2nd century BC. It became part of the kingdom of Lazica before being incorporated into the Kingdom of Abkhazia in the 8th century AD, the latter led unification of Georgian monarchy in the 11th century.

Adjaria was occupied by several empires: the First Persian Empire (500 BC), Seljuks (11th century), Mongols (13th century), and Timurids (14th century).

=== Ottoman period ===
The Ottomans conquered the area in 1614. Although, the Ottoman millet system allowed its subjects extensive self-governance and religious freedom, many Adjarians gradually chose to convert to Islam during the 200 years of Ottoman presence. Despite this, the population never abandoned its native Georgian tongue and avoided demographic influence from the Ottomans. The nobility converted to Islam first. Adjarians were fully Islamized by the end of the eighteenth century.

=== Russian Empire ===
The Ottomans were forced to cede Adjara to the expanding Russian Empire in 1878 under the Treaty of Berlin. The Berlin Treaty allowed Adjarians to leave for Turkey, keeping a provision of Section 6, article 21 of the Treaty of San Stefano. Many Adjarians emigrated to Turkey, and there was an influx of Christians from Kakheti, resulting in a change of the religious landscape. While the Russian authorities supported the Russian Orthodox Church's missionary efforts, they also tried to win the loyalty of Adjarians by building mosques and madrassas and supporting the local Muslim clergy. As a result, many Adjarians emigrants, called Muhacir, came back to Adjara. Within the Russian Empire's administrative division, Adjara was known as the Batumi okrug, which formed part of the Kutaisi Governorate.

=== Georgian Democratic Republic ===
In 1918, Georgia regained its independence as a democratic republic and Adjara became part of it. However, in April 1918, the Ottoman Empire invaded Georgia and captured Batumi. The operation was conducted on 13–14 April 1918, with the 37th Division entering Batumi under the command of Colonel Kâzım Karabekir.

On 4 June 1918, the Treaty of Batum was signed, under which Georgia was forced to cede Adjara to the Ottoman Empire. However, due to the Ottoman defeat in the First World War and the Treaty of Mudros, the Ottomans soon withdrew from the territory. British troops (warship HMS Liverpool) entered Batumi in 1918, and Adjara was temporarily placed under the British Military Governor James Cooke-Collis, who established the Council for the Administration of Batoum and its Region in December 1918 to administer the former Batumi okrug. The British withdrew in 1920 and Adjara rejoined the Democratic Republic of Georgia. The British administration ceded the region to the Democratic Republic of Georgia on July 20, 1920. It was granted autonomy under the Georgian constitution adopted in February 1921 when the Red Army invaded Georgia. Turkey reinvaded Adjara in March 1921, although Georgians defeated Turks in the Battle of Batumi and Ankara's government ceded the territory to Georgia under Article VI of Treaty of Kars on the condition that autonomy be provided for the Muslim population, while Turkish commodities were guaranteed free transit through the port of Batumi. The Soviets established in 1921 the Adjarian Autonomous Soviet Socialist Republic within the Georgian Soviet Socialist Republic in accord with this clause, thus Adjara remained part of Georgia. The Adjarian autonomous republic was the only autonomous unit in the USSR based solely on religion. (Note: The other autonomous unit based on an ethnoreligious factor was the Jewish Autonomous Oblast.) However, Stalin's definition of what constituted a nation was based on language. Without their own language, Adjars did not develop a strong sense of national identity, separate from Georgian. Moreover, the Soviet atheist ideology dampened religious practice. In the 1920s, the Ajars rebelled against the Soviet anti-Islamic activities, as well as against the collectivization reforms. The armed uprising began in the mountainous regions of Adjara in April 1929. Soviet troops were deployed in response and swiftly quelled the revolt.

=== Independent Georgia ===
After Georgian independence, Aslan Abashidze became the chairman of Adjaria's parliament, the Adjarian Supreme Soviet. Abashidze was initially appointed by the first Georgian president Zviad Gamsakhurdia in 1991. However, he later took advantage of the civil war in the country and turned Adjara into the personal fiefdom, although it remained relatively prosperous enclave in an otherwise rather chaotic country. During the 1991–1992 Georgian coup d'état which ousted Gamsakhurdia from power, Abashidze declared a state of emergency in Adjara, closing its borders and shutting down the Adjarian Supreme Soviet. In response to pressure from the Adjarian opposition led by Republican Party of Georgia, Georgia's new leader Eduard Shevardnadze met Aslan Abashidze in Batumi and persuaded him to resume the Supreme Soviet sessions in May 1992. However, the opposition failed to oust Abashidze. While Shevardnadze could easily sway certain members of the Adjarian Supreme Soviet against Abashidze, he did not do so. Being brought to power through the coup launched by the militia leaders Jaba Ioseliani and Tengiz Kitovani, Shevardnadze saw Abashidze as a useful counterweight against these warlords.

Further exploiting the instability, at this time brought by the War in Abkhazia, Abashidze moved to further consolidate his power. During the summer of 1992, Abashidze appointed a seven-member Presidium of the Adjarian Supreme Soviet, made up of his supporters, and ruled by decree through this body. The Supreme Soviet, on the other hand, practically ceased to convene. Abashidze unilaterally took power without formal agreement and started to withhold tax revenue and capture Adjara's considerable wealth. However, he managed to prevent various paramilitary groups from entering Adjara's territory, and preserved peace through authoritarianism, which brought him considerable popularity.

After the end of Georgia's civil war, Abashidze reached agreement with the Georgian president Eduard Shevardnadze to stay in power. Shevardnadze, who had yet to cement his power in Georgia, ignored Abashidze's authoritarian rule and even appreciated that it brought stability to the region. The central government in Tbilisi had very little say in what went on in Adjara. Elections in Adjara were not free and fair, Abashidze controlled the media and captured customs revenue for his personal enrichment. Abashidze instituted border control with the rest of Georgia and created armed paramilitaries. However, he asserted that Adjara wasn't separatist. Adjara is the only autonomous region in the Southern Caucasus that has not been involved in a secessionist conflict with the central government since the dissolution of the Soviet Union. Although Adjarians, a subgroup of ethnic Georgians, adopted Islam during centuries of Ottoman rule over Adjara, distinguishing them from other Georgian subgroups that predominantly adhere to Orthodox Christianity, they retained many cultural similarities with Christian Georgians and did not develop a separate "Adjarian identity," remaining within the broader Georgian national identity. This provided an insufficient basis for a strong nationalist or excessively regionalist movement in Adjara. Moreover, his considerable power and resources enabled Abashidze to establish a political and financial base extending throughout Georgia, while his Union for the Revival party participated in nationwide elections.

Abashidze's regime survived on receiving funds from the customs control in Sarpi at Georgia–Turkey border, contraband of cigarettes and allegedly also weapons and narcotics, an oil refinery in Batumi and selling of ships stationed in Adjara without Georgian government's approval. Even though Shevardnadze often complained about Abashidze's aggressive autonomous strategy, they had good relationships and supported each other when they needed public support. Initially, Abashidze's Democratic Union for Revival and Shevardnadze's Union of Citizens of Georgia cooperated in the Georgian Parliament and the Adjarian Supreme Council following the 1995–1996 elections. However, a series of disputes with the UCG in 1997 over the limits of Abashidze's authority in Adjara, along with defections of his party's deputies to the UCG, led him to become increasingly suspicious of the UCG, particularly its "reformist" faction. He subsequently withdrew into opposition and established a powerful anti-UCG bloc, which contested the 1999 Georgian parliamentary election and won around 25% of the vote.

In 2000, by withdrawing his candidacy from the presidential elections in Georgia, Abashidze managed to get Shevardnadze to change Georgian constitution to increase Adjara's status. From 1997 to 2001, Abashidze passed several amendments to Adjara's constitution to strengthen his power. He established the post of a directly elected Head of the Autonomous Republic of Adjara with powers to control any movement of military on Adjara's territory, and was elected on this position in November 2001 while being the only candidate.

The situation changed following the Rose Revolution of 2003 when Shevardnadze was deposed in favor of the reformist opposition leader Mikheil Saakashvili. Adjaran leader Aslan Abashidze, being in strong opposition to the Rose Revolution, declared a state of emergency immediately after Eduard Shevardnadze's ousting on 23 November 2003. (Note: International Crisis Group, 2004, page 6.) He intensified a crackdown on opposition, with dozens being injured as a result of clashes between protesters and police in the southern Adjaran village of Gonio in January 2004. Soon after his inauguration as president in January 2004, Saakashvili took aim at Abashidze with strong anticorruption reforms. In the wake of Abashidze's visit to Moscow, the Russian Foreign Ministry issued a statement on January 20 backing Abashidze's policy and condemning his opposition as "extremist forces." In spring 2004, a major crisis in Adjara erupted as the central government sought to reimpose its authority on the region. It led to several encounters between Abashidze's paramilitaries and the Georgian army. However, Saakashvili's ultimate and mass protests in Batumi against Abashidze's autocratic rule forced the Adjaran leader to resign in May 2004. Facing charges of embezzlement and murder, Abashidze destroyed the bridges between Adjara and the rest of Georgia to delay the advance of Georgian troops in Batumi and then fled to Moscow. Even Abashidze's former ally, Haji Mahmud Kamashidze, sided with Saakashvili. Saakashvili wanted Adjara to keep a significant autonomy. A new law was therefore introduced to redefine the terms of Adjara's autonomy. Levan Varshalomidze succeeded Abashidze as the chairman of the government.

In July 2007, the seat of the Georgian Constitutional Court was moved from Tbilisi to Batumi. In November 2007 Russia ended its two-century military presence in the region by withdrawing from the 12th Military Base (the former 145th Motor Rifle Division) in Batumi.

Turkey still has noticeable economic and religious influence in Adjara, making some Georgians wary of the Turkish presence. In the early 2020s, Turkish influence was again supplanted by the Russians, who returned to the region in large numbers, also causing anxiety among some locals.

== Law and government ==
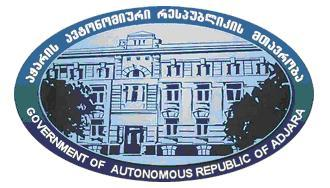
Logo of the Cabinet of Ministers.

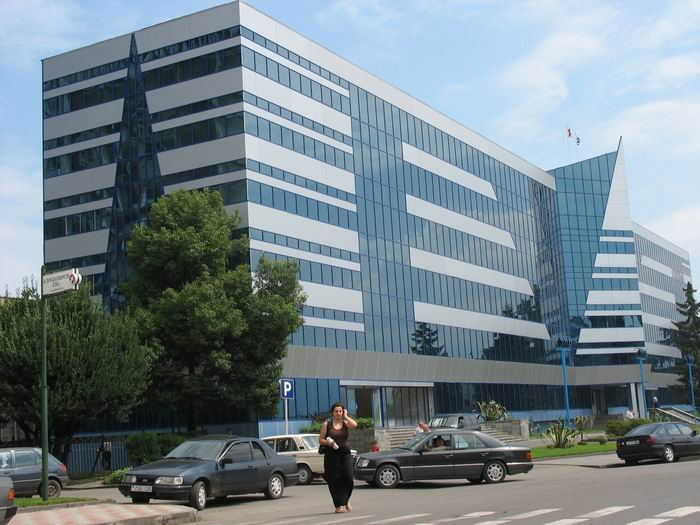
Government building in Batumi.

The status of the Adjaran Autonomous Republic is defined by Georgia's law on Adjara and the region's new constitution, adopted following the ousting of Aslan Abashidze. The local legislative body is the Supreme Council. The head of the region's government—the Council of Ministers of Adjara—is nominated by the President of Georgia who also has powers to dissolve the assembly and government and to overrule local authorities on issues where the constitution of Georgia is contravened. Tornike Rizhvadze was head of the Adjaran government until 2025. In April 2025 the Supreme Council approved Sulkhan Tamazashvili as head of the Adjaran government.

On 24 October 1997, Adjara became a full member of the Assembly of European Regions (AER).

=== Administrative divisions ===
Adjara is subdivided into six administrative units:

Name	Area (km^{2})	Population			Pop. Density (p/km^{2})
Name	Area (km^{2})	Census (17 Jan 2002)	Census (2014)	Census (2024)	Pop. Density (p/km^{2})
City of Batumi	64.9	121,806	152,839	183,200	2,822
Keda Municipality	452	20,024	16,760	16,300	36
Kobuleti Municipality	720	88,063	74,794	68,100	122
Khelvachauri Municipality	410	90,843	51,189	52,900	129
Shuakhevi Municipality	588	21,850	15,044	14,500	24
Khulo Municipality	710	33,430	23,327	28,300	39

== Geography ==
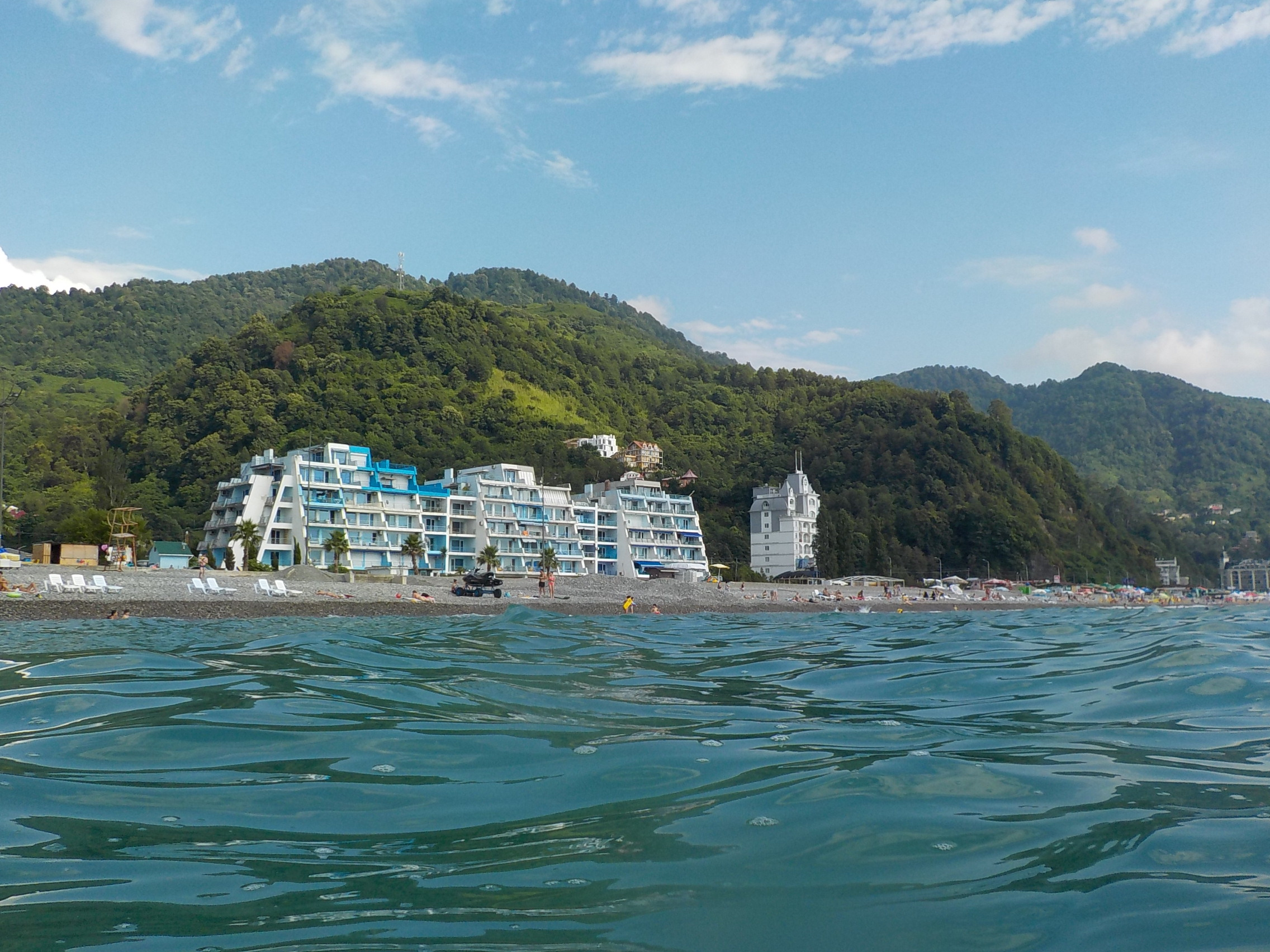
Gonio, a Black Sea resort near Gonio Fortress.

Adjara is on the southeastern coast of the Black Sea and extends into the wooded foothills and mountains of the Lesser Caucasus. It has borders with the region of Guria to the north, Samtskhe-Javakheti to the east and Turkey to the south. Most of Adjara's territory either consists of hills or mountains. The highest mountains rise more than 3,000 meters (9,800 feet) above sea level. Around 60% of Adjara is covered by forests. Many parts of the Meskheti Range (the west-facing slopes) are covered by temperate rain forests.

Adjara is traversed by the northeasterly line of equal latitude and longitude.

=== Climate ===
Adjara is well known for its humid climate (especially along the coastal regions) and prolonged rainy weather, although there is plentiful sunshine during the spring and summer months. Adjara receives the highest amounts of precipitation both in Georgia and in the Caucasus. It is also one of the wettest temperate regions in the Northern Hemisphere. No region along Adjara's coast receives less than 2,200 mm (86.6 in) of precipitation per year. The west-facing (windward) slopes of the Meskheti Range receive upwards of 4,500 mm (177.2 in) of precipitation per year. The coastal lowlands receive most of the precipitation in the form of rain (due to the area's subtropical climate). September and October are usually the wettest months. Batumi's average monthly rainfall for the month of September is 410 mm (16.14 in). The interior parts of Adjara are considerably drier than the coastal mountains and lowlands. Winter usually brings significant snowfall to the higher regions of Adjara, where snowfall often reaches several meters. Average summer temperatures are between 22 and 24 °C (72 and 75 °F) in the lowland areas and between 17 and 21 °C (63 and 70 °F) in the highlands. The highest areas of Adjara have lower temperatures. Average winter temperatures are between 4 and 6 °C (39 and 43 °F) along the coast while the interior areas and mountains average around −3 to 2 °C (27 to 36 °F). Some of the highest mountains of Adjara have average winter temperatures of −8 to −7 °C (18 to 19 °F).

== Economy ==
Adjara has good land for growing tea, citrus fruits and tobacco. Mountainous and forested, the region has a subtropical climate, and there are many health resorts. Tobacco, tea, citrus fruits, and avocados are leading crops; livestock raising is also important. Industries include tea packing, tobacco processing, fruit and fish canning, oil refining, and shipbuilding.

The regional capital, Batumi, is an important gateway for the shipment of goods heading into Georgia, Azerbaijan and landlocked Armenia. The port of Batumi is used for the shipment of oil from Kazakhstan and Turkmenistan. Its oil refineries handle Caspian oil coming from Azerbaijan which arrives by pipeline to Supsa port and is transported from there to Batumi by rail. The Adjaran capital is a center for shipbuilding and manufacturing.

Adjara is the main center of Georgia's coastal tourism industry, having displaced the northwestern province of Abkhazia since that region's de facto secession from Georgia in 1993.

According to 2021 data, the gross domestic product of the Autonomous Republic of Adjara was 4.86 billion GEL (9.3% of Georgia’s GDP).

== Demographics ==
According to the 2024 census, the population of Adjara is 402,929.

=== Ethnic groups ===
1. Georgians (96.0%)
2. Armenians (1.60%)
3. Russians (1.10%)
4. other (1.30%)

The Adjarians (Ajars) are an ethnographic group of the Georgian people who speak a group of local dialects known collectively as Adjarian. The written language is Georgian. Adjarians have been known as "Muslim Georgians." They were officially referred as such until the 1926 Soviet census which listed them as "Ajars" and counted 71,000 of them. Later, they were simply classified under a broader category of Georgians as no official Soviet census asked about religion. In independent Georgia, censuses do not include an "Adjarian" category, nor do they distinguish between ethnic Georgian Muslims and other Muslims, such as Azerbaijanis.

Ethnic minorities include Laz, Russians, Armenians, Pontic Greeks, and Abkhaz.

=== Religion ===
Religion in Adjara
1. Orthodox Christianity (59.5%)
2. Islam (33.9%)
3. Armenian Apostolic Church (0.18%)
4. Others (5.43%)

Christianity spread to Adjara in the first century. Andrew the Apostle, who is believed to be a missionary of the Mother of God to Georgia and founder of the Georgian Orthodox Church, entered Georgia from Adjara region and first preached Christianity there.

Islam spread to the region following the Ottoman conquest in the 17th century, and the Adjarians were fully Islamized by the end of the 18th century.

After Adjara was ceded to the Russian Empire in 1878 under the Treaty of Berlin, those Adjarians who were Muslim were allowed to leave for Turkey. This was followed by an influx of Christians from Kakheti, resulting in a change of the religious landscape. While the Russian authorities supported the Russian Orthodox Church's missionary efforts, they also tried to win the loyalty of Adjarians by building mosques and madrassas and supporting the local Muslim clergy. As a result, many Adjarians emigrants, called Muhacir, came back to Adjara.

Although Adjara's political and religious autonomy was guaranteed by the 1921 Treaty of Kars, the Soviet atheist ideology dampened religious practice in the region.

The collapse of the Soviet Union and the re-establishment of Georgia's independence first led to an Islamic revival. However, later Christianity has experienced a strong growth in Adjara, especially among the young. Nevertheless, there still remain Sunni Muslim communities in Adjara, mainly in the Khulo district. The Turkish Directorate of Religious Affairs is active in Adjara. According to Ghia Nodia, many Adjarians are Muslims but they consider themselves ethnic Georgians.

According to the 2024 census, 59.54% of Adjara's population is Orthodox Christian, while 33.85% is Muslim, the rest includes atheists, adherents of the Armenian Apostolic Church and others. In the main, coastal city of Batumi, out of 235 668 inhabitants, 66.3% is Eastern Orthodox Christian, and they primarily adhere to the national Georgian Orthodox Church. Muslims make up 25.4% of population, while there are also Catholic, Armenian Apostolic, Jehovah's Witness, Seventh-day Adventist, and Jewish communities. In the second largest and also coastal Kobuleti Municipality, 71% of the population in Orthodox Christian, while 23.5% is Muslim. Muslims make up majorities mostly in the mountainous districts, they make up 95.3% of the population in Khulo Municipality, and 79.3% in Shuakhevi Municipality; in lowland regions it is much more balanced: 58.2% in Keda Municipality and 51.5% Khelvachauri.

Religion by Adjara Municipalities in 2024 census (%)
Municipalities	Orthodox Christians		Muslims		Others	
Municipalities	Number	%	Number	%	Number	%
City of Batumi	156259	66.3	59779	25.4	19590	8.3
Keda Municipality	5517	37.5	8550	58.2	630	4.3
Kobuleti Municipality	52596	71	17390	23.5	4041	5.5
Khelvachauri Municipality	22619	44.3	26294	51.5	2178	4.2
Shuakhevi Municipality	2167	19.5	8803	79.3	134	1.2
Khulo Municipality	707	4.3	15570	95.3	65	0.1

== Traditional public festivals ==
=== Selimoba ===
Selimoba is held in the village of Bako, Khulo Municipality on June 3 and commemorates the life of Selim Khimshiashvili. A concert with the participation of local amateur groups of a folk handicraft products exhibition is held during the festival. It is supported by the Ministry of Education, Culture and Sports of Adjara.

=== Shuamtoba ===
Shuamtoba ("inter-mountain festival") is a traditional festival, which is held on the summer mountain pastures of two municipalities (Khulo and Shuakhevi), during the first weekend of every August. Horse racing, a folk handicraft exhibition and a concert involving folk ensembles are held as well.

=== Machakhloba ===
Machakhloba is a Machakhela gorge festivity, held in the second half of September. It is a traditional holiday celebrated in Machakhela gorge, Khelvachauri Municipality. The festival begins at the Machakhela rifle monument (at the point of convergence of the rivers Machakhelistskali and Chorokhi), continues in the village Machakhlispiri and ends in the village Zeda Chkhutuneti.

=== Kolkhoba ===
Kolkhoba is an ancient Laz festival. It is held at the end of August or at the beginning of September in Sarpi village, Khelvachauri District. The story of the Argonauts is performed on stage during the festival.

== Notable people ==
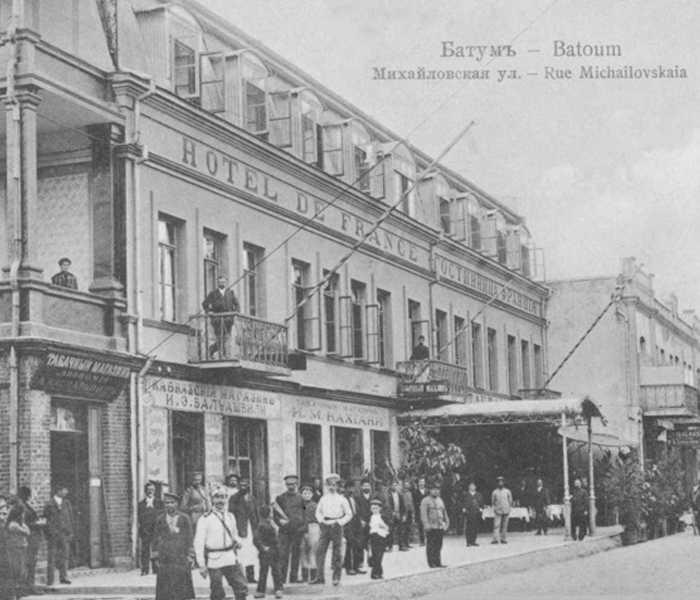
Batumi in the 1900s.

- Aslan Abashidze (born 1938), head of the Adjarian government 1991–2004
- Memed Abashidze (1873–1941), prominent political leader of Muslim Georgians
- Tbeli Abuserisdze (1190–1240), Georgian writer and scientist
- Fadiko Gogitidze (1916–1940), Adjara's first woman pilot
- Sopho Khalvashi (born 31 May 1986), Georgian singer
- Ahmed-Pasha Khimshiashvili (died 1836), Great Ottoman Pasha
- Selim Khimshiashvili (3 June 1815), Pasha (Minister) of Ottoman and Russia Political Affairs on 1802
- Zurab Nogaideli (born 1964), former Prime Minister of Georgia 2005–2007
- Levan Varshalomidze (born 1972), head of the Adjarian government 2004–2012
- Fyodor Yurchikhin (born 3 January 1959), cosmonaut

== See also ==
- Former countries in Europe after 1815
- Merisi Mining District
- Administrative divisions of Georgia (country)

== Sources ==
- Derluguian, Georgi M. (1998). "The Tale of Two Resorts: Abkhazia and Ajaria Before and Since the Soviet Collapse". In Crawford, Beverly; Lipschutz, Ronnie D. (eds.). The Myth of "Ethnic Conflict": Politics, Economics, and "Cultural" Violence. Research series. University of California at Berkeley. ISBN 978-0-87725-198-9. OCLC 39282004.
- George, Julie A. (2009). The Politics of Ethnic Separatism in Russia and Georgia. Palgrave Macmillan. doi:10.1057/9780230102323. ISBN 978-0-230-61359-1. OCLC 320435107.
- Hoch, Tomáš; Kopeček, Vincent (2011). "Transforming Identity of Ajarian Population". ALPPI Annual of Language & Politics and Politics of Identity. V (5): 57–72. ISSN 1803-1757.
- Kaufman, Stuart J. (2001). Modern Hatreds: The Symbolic Politics of Ethnic War (1 ed.). Cornell University Press. ISBN 978-0-8014-3802-8. JSTOR 10.7591/j.ctt1tm7gbw. OCLC 1160511946.
- Sanikidze, George (2018). "Muslim Communities of Georgia: Old Problems and New Challenges". Islamophobia Studies Journal. 4 (2): 247–265. doi:10.13169/islastudj.4.2.0247. ISSN 2325-8381.
