= Akho Mosque =

Mosque in Keda, Adjara, Georgia

- ახოს ჯამე

Religion
- Affiliation: Sunni Islam
- Ecclesiastical or organizational status: Friday mosque
- Status: Active

Location
- Location: Akho, Keda Municipality, Adjara
- Country: Georgia
- Interactive map of Akho Mosque
- Coordinates: 41°38′54″N 42°03′36″E

Architecture
- Type: Mosque
- Style: Ottoman; Vernacular Georgian
- Completed: 1818

Specifications
- Dome: 1
- Minaret: 1
- Materials: Timber

The Akho Mosque (Georgian: ახოს ჯამე, romanized: akhos jame) is a Friday mosque in the village of Akho, in Adjara, an autonomous entity in southwest Georgia. Completed in 1818, it is the oldest extant mosque in Adjara. The building is known for its decorative wooden carvings on the door and minbar, a fusion of Ottoman motifs and elements of vernacular Georgian architecture. The mosque is inscribed on the list of the Immovable Cultural Monuments of National Significance of Georgia.

== History ==
The Akho Mosque stands at an old cemetery in the eponymous village, part of the Keda Municipality in Adjara. It was built by the Laz craftsman Usta Hussein in 1233 AH (1817/1818 CE), when the region was part of the Ottoman Empire, and renovated in 1340 AH (1921/1922 CE) as suggested by a foundation stone at the base of the minaret. After a period of the Soviet rule, the mosque became functional again in the 1990s.

== Architecture ==
The mosque is a two-storey wooden structure, set in a rectangular ground plan and measuring 8.8 by 9.3 metres (29 by 31 ft). The first floor acts as a cellar and the second floor is a prayer room with two tiers of windows. The building is roofed with ceramic tiles. On the south there is an arched toothed mihrab with an Arabic inscription. The dome is adorned with oil paintings—now damaged and covered with a plain fiberboard paneling—and has a lace balustrade part of which functions as a balcony. The lower section of the minaret is made of dry masonry and is what remains of an older minaret demolished in the 1920; its extant replacement was constructed in the 1990s. The pulpit, minbar, and balustrade of the choir bear incised ornate wooden carvings painted in different colors. The building is lit by several windows cut in each wall. The front door, with its intricate carved woodwork, is a modern replica of the original which was removed to the Adjara State Museum in Batumi in the Soviet period.

== See also ==
- Islam in Georgia
- List of mosques in Georgia
