= Juma Mosque =

Juma Mosque may refer to mosques in the following countries:

== In Azerbaijan ==
- Agdam Mosque, also known as Juma Mosque, in Aghdam
- Juma Mosque, Baku
- Juma Mosque, Balaken
- Juma Mosque, Ganja
- Juma Mosque, Nakhchivan
- Juma Mosque, Ordubad
- Juma Mosque, Qabala
- Juma Mosque, Shamakhi
- Juma Mosque in Sheki

== In Crimea ==
- Juma-Jami Mosque

== In Georgia ==
- Juma Mosque, Tbilisi

== In India ==
- Juma Mosque, Pullancheri

== In Russia ==
- Juma Mosque of Derbent

== In South Africa ==
- Juma Mosque, Durban

== In Uzbekistan ==
- Juma Mosque, Khiva

== See also ==
- Congregational mosque
