= Islam in Georgia =

Islam in Georgia may refer to:

- Islam in Georgia (country)
- Islam in Georgia (U.S. state)

== See also ==
- List of mosques in Georgia (disambiguation)
