= List of bridges in Georgia (country) =

This list of bridges in Georgia lists bridges of particular historical, scenic, architectural or engineering interest. Road and railway bridges, viaducts, aqueducts and footbridges are included.

== Historical and architectural interest bridges ==
| | Name | Georgian | Distinction | Length | Type | Carries Crosses | Opened | Location | Region | Ref. |
|---|---|---|---|---|---|---|---|---|---|---|
| 1 | Pompey's Bridge in ruins | პომპეუსის ხიდი | | | Masonry; 2 arches | Kura | | Mtskheta; 41°50′19.7″N 44°42′22.8″E | Mtskheta-Mtianeti | |
| 2 | Dandalo bridge | დანდალოს ხიდი | Monument ID 3461 | 20 m (66 ft) | Masonry; 1 arch | Footbridge; Acharistsqali | 11th-12th century | Dandalo; 41°38′48.0″N 42°06′27.5″E | Adjara | |
| 3 | Makhuntseti Bridge | მახუნცეთის ხიდი | Monument ID 5945 | 24 m (79 ft) | Masonry; 1 arch | Footbridge; Acharistsqali | 11th-12th century | Makhuntseti; 41°34′15.7″N 41°51′36.2″E | Adjara | |
| 4 | Purtio Bridge | ფურტიოს ხიდი | | 13 m (43 ft) | Masonry; 1 arch | Footbridge; Acharistsqali | 11th-12th century | Zamleti; 41°37′16.7″N 42°15′49.9″E | Adjara | |
| 5 | Red Bridge | წითელი ხიდი | Azerbaijan–Georgia border Span : 26 m (85 ft) | 175 m (574 ft) | Masonry; 4 arches | Footbridge; Khrami | 12th century | Kirach-Mughanlo - II Şıxlı; 41°19′44.8″N 45°04′23.1″E | Kvemo Kartli; Azerbaijan | |
| 6 | Varjanauli Bridge | ვარჯანაულის ხიდი | | | Masonry; 1 arch | Footbridge; Kintrishi River | 17th century | Varjanauli; 41°47′19.2″N 41°57′37.8″E | Adjara | |
| 7 | Khabelashvilebi Bridge | ხაბელაშვილების ხიდი | | 26 m (85 ft) | Covered; Wood | Footbridge; Naghvarevistskali River | 18th century | Khabelashvilebi; 41°42′20.1″N 42°10′46.8″E | Adjara | |
| 8 | White Bridge (Kutaisi) | თეთრი ხიდი | Monument ID 606 | | Truss; 2 arches | Road bridge Rioni River | 1852 | Kutaisi; 42°16′07.3″N 42°42′01.4″E | Imereti | |
| 9 | Maglivi Bridge | საფეხმავლო ხიდი | | | Cable-stayed; Steel deck and pylon | Footbridge; Vere River | | Tbilisi; 41°42′53.0″N 44°43′22.4″E | Tbilisi | |
| 10 | Bridge of Peace | მშვიდობის ხიდი | | 160 m (520 ft) | Arch; Steel through arch | Footbridge; Kura | 2010 | Tbilisi; 41°41′34.8″N 44°48′29.7″E | Tbilisi | |
| 11 | Mobius Loop Bridge | | | | Beam bridge | Footbridge; Borjomula River | | Borjomi; 41°50′14.4″N 43°23′16.4″E | Samtskhe–Javakheti | |

== Notes and references ==
- Notes
- Nicolas Janberg. "International Database for Civil and Structural Engineering". Structurae.com.
- Others references

== See also ==
- Transport in Georgia (country)
- Georgian Railway
- Roads in Georgia (country)
- Geography of Georgia (country)
