= Chao Mosque =

Mosque in Adjara, Georgia

- სოფელ ჩაოს მეჩეთი

Religion
- Affiliation: Islam
- Ecclesiastical or organizational status: Mosque (1912–1936); Profane use (1936–c. 1991); Mosque (since c. 1991– )
- Status: Active

Location
- Location: Chao, Adjara
- Country: Georgia
- Interactive map of Chao Mosque
- Coordinates: 41.620333°N 42.292694°E

Architecture
- Groundbreaking: 1909
- Completed: 1912; 1995 (renovation)

Specifications
- Length: 9.2 m (30 ft)
- Width: 7.5 m (25 ft)
- Height (max): 4.3 m (14 ft)
- Minaret: 1 (removed in 1936)
- Materials: Timber; corrugated metal

The Chao Mosque (Georgian: სოფელ ჩაოს მეჩეთი) is a wooden mosque in the village of Chao (Note: Chao, Georgia) in the Adjara region of Georgia.

== History ==
Built between 1909 and 1912 by Laz craftsmen from Batumi, the mosque was restored between 1993 and 1995. The first minaret of the mosque was demolished in 1936 on the orders of Soviet authorities. In the same year, the mosque was converted into a warehouse and the madrasa next to the mosque into a social club. The interior of the mosque is decorated with murals of corn stalk motifs. The mosque is 4.3 metres (14 ft) high, 9.2 metres (30 ft) long and 7.5 metres (25 ft) wide. The corrugated metal cladding of the mosque was brought from Turkey and the carpets from Batumi.

As of 2018, the mosque was still in use, though a 1988 landslide in Chao led many residents to move away, reducing the mosque's attendance.

== See also ==
- Islam in Georgia
- List of mosques in Georgia
