= Kvirike Mosque =

Mosque in Adjara, Georgia

- კვირიკეს ჯამე
- Location within Adjara

Religion
- Affiliation: Sunni Islam
- Ecclesiastical or organizational status: Friday mosque
- Status: Active

Location
- Location: Kvirike, Kobuleti Municipality, Adjara
- Country: Georgia
- Interactive map of Kvirike Mosque
- Coordinates: 41°45′58″N 41°50′18″E

Architecture
- Type: Mosque
- Style: Ottoman; Georgian vernacular
- Completed: 1861

Specifications
- Minaret: 1 (demolished 1920s)
- Materials: Timber

The Kvirike Mosque (Georgian: კვირიკეს ჯამე, romanized: k'virik'es jame) is a Friday mosque in Kvirike, Adjara, an autonomous entity in southwest Georgia. Completed in 1861, it is one of the oldest surviving mosques in Adjara. The building is abundantly adorned with decorative wooden carvings. The mosque is inscribed on the list of the Immovable Cultural Monuments of National Significance of Georgia.

== Overview ==
The Kvirike Mosque stands in the center of the eponymous village in Adjara's coastal Kobuleti Municipality. It was built by a Laz craftsman from Arhavi in 1277 AH (1860/1861 CE), when the area was part of the Ottoman Empire. Like other early mosques in Adjara, Kvirike's layout blends the Ottoman influences with Georgian vernacular architectural elements of local villages. The mosque had a minaret and madrasa, both demolished by the Soviet authorities in the 1920s. Both external and internal walls as well as the mihrab, minbar, columns, and balcony, bear original elaborate incised woodwork. The mosque does not have a full dome but a recess with an inset carved medallion. The mosque was renovated in 2013 and is functional, reserved for Friday or holiday services.

== See also ==
- Islam in Georgia
- List of mosques in Georgia
