= List of bridges in Georgia =

List of bridges in Georgia may refer to:

- List of bridges in Georgia (country)
- List of covered bridges in Georgia
- List of bridges documented by the Historic American Engineering Record in Georgia
- List of bridges on the National Register of Historic Places in Georgia
