= Imam Hussein Mosque (Marneuli) =

Mosque in Marneuli, Georgia

- İmam Hüseyn məscidi იმამ ჰუსეინის მეჩეთი
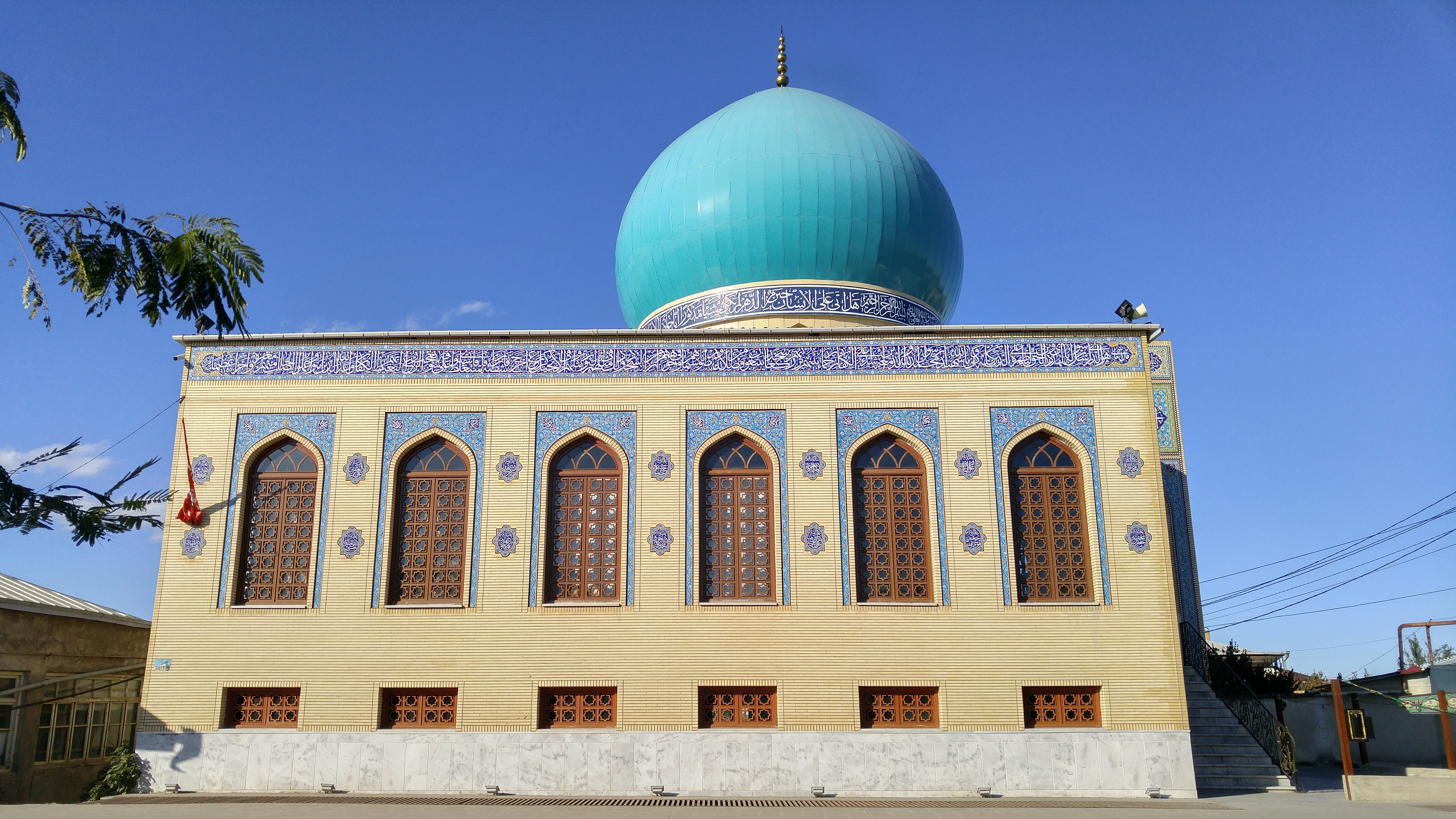
- Imam Hussein mosque

- Location of the mosque in Georgia

Religion
- Affiliation: Shia Islam
- Ecclesiastical or organizational status: Mosque
- Ownership: Georgian Muslims Department
- Status: Active

Location
- Location: Marneuli, Marneuli Municipality, Kvemo Kartli
- Country: Georgia
- Interactive map of Imam Hussein Mosque
- Coordinates: 41°27′50″N 44°49′07″E

Architecture
- Type: Mosque architecture
- Style: Safavid
- Funded by: Jawad al-Shahristani
- Completed: 2016

The Imam Hussein Mosque (Azerbaijani: İmam Hüseyn məscidi; Georgian: იმამ ჰუსეინის მეჩეთი) is an Azerbaijani Shia mosque, located in the city of Marneuli in the Marneuli Municipality of Kvemo Kartli, Georgia. It was opened as the second mosque of Marneuli in 2016 to serve the local Azerbaijani community.

== History ==
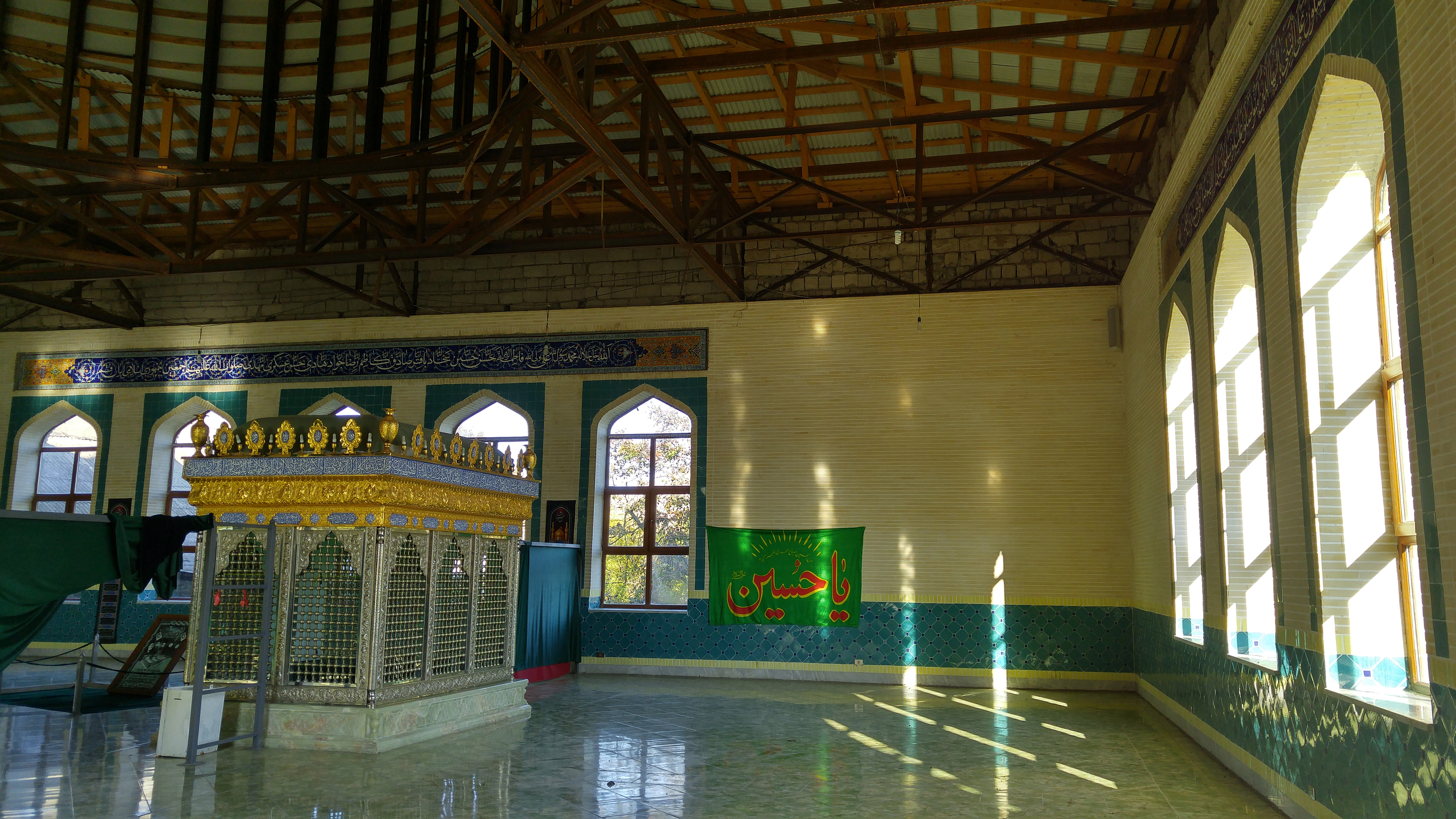
Mosque interior.

Shia Muslims, most of whom are Azerbaijanis, are the biggest religious minority in Georgia, particularly making up the majority in the Marneuli Municipality. Originally, Marneuli only had one mosque, the small 18th century Imam Ali Mosque (İmam Əli məscidi; იმამ ალის მეჩეთი), which was repaired in 2000.

In 2014, a new mosque was commissioned to be built with the help of Iranian-Iraqi cleric Jawad al-Shahristani, who serves as a representative of Ayatollah Ali al-Sistani. The mosque's opening took place in 2016 and was attended by an Iranian delegation, alongside Georgian and Azerbaijani politicians. The mosque, built in the Safavid style, was inspired by the Shah Mosque in Isfahan and has three floors.

In Ramadan of 2020, the mosque handed out donations to 60 families in need in the area.

== See also ==
- Islam in Georgia
- List of mosques in Georgia
