= Keda, Georgia =

Keda ქედა
- Town
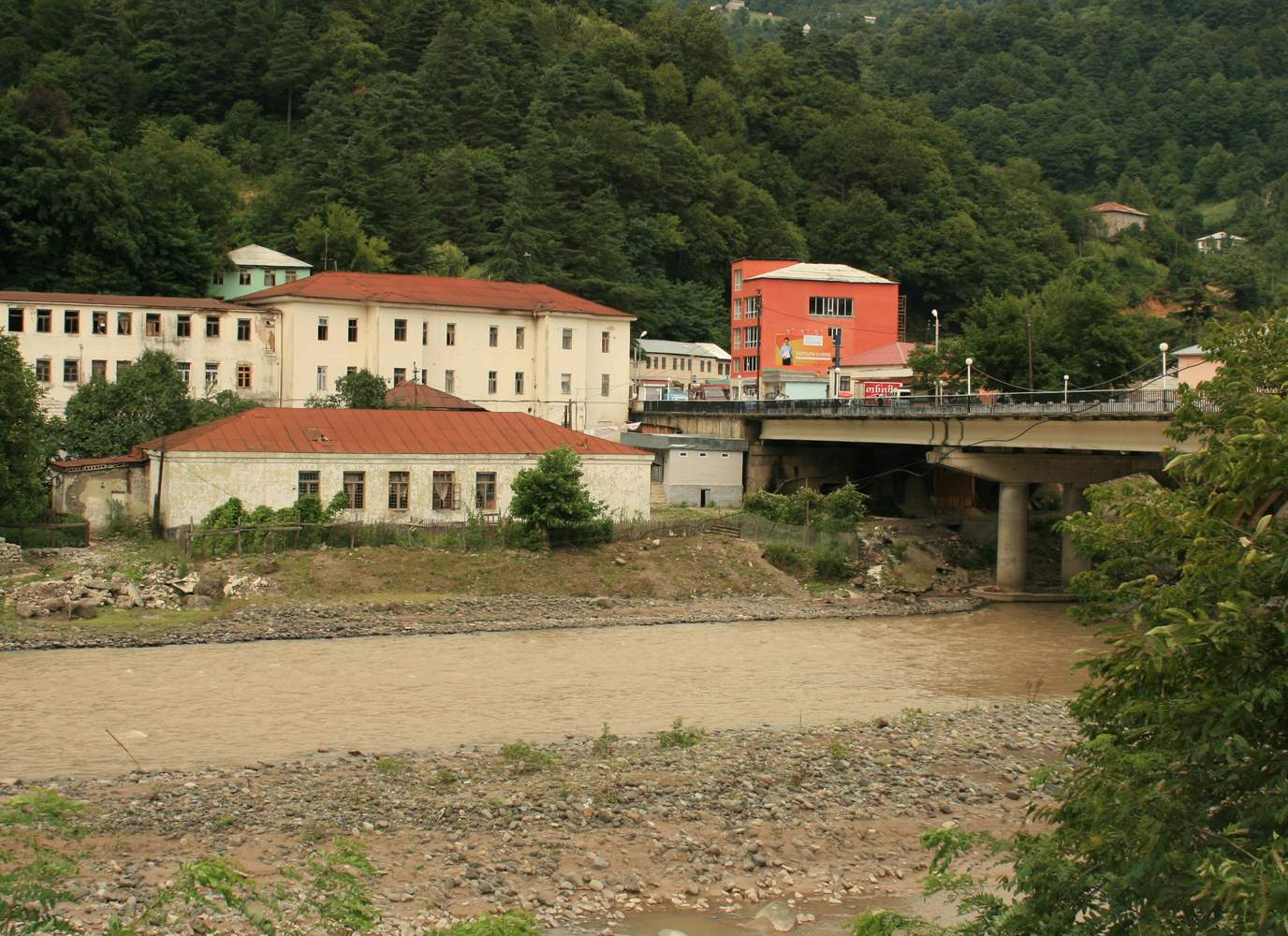

- Location within Georgia Location within Adjara
- Coordinates: 41°35′52″N 41°56′33″E
- Country: Georgia
- Autonomous Republic: Adjara
- Municipality: Keda
- Town from: 1966
- Elevation: 256 m (840 ft)

Population (2021)
  - Total: 1,285
- Time zone: UTC+4 (Georgian Time)
- Website: keda.gov.ge

Keda (Georgian: ქედა [kʰeda]) is an urban-type settlement (daba) in the Autonomous Republic of Adjara, in southwestern Georgia, located 42 kilometres (26 mi) east of the regional capital Batumi. The town of 1,285 residents (2021) is the administrative centre of the Keda Municipality, and is located at the confluence of the Acharistsqali (literally 'river of Adjara') and Akavreta rivers, at an elevation of 256 metres (840 ft) above sea level.

The town has administrative, educational and health facilities, small businesses, and a museum of local history. Keda was a trading post in the 19th century. It was given the status of daba in 1966.

== Population ==
At the beginning of 2021, Keda had a population of 1,285, a decrease of 15% since the 2014 census. According to the 2014 census, the town is almost entirely ethnic Georgian.

Year	1923	1939	1959	1970	1979	1989	2002	2014	2021
Population	124	▲624	▲627	▼595	▲815	▲1,197	▲1,244	▲1,510	▼1,285
Data: Population statistics Georgia 1897 to present. Note: (Note: The 2014 census found an inexplicable gap with the data from the national statistical office Geostat. UN-assisted research has found the 2002 census was inflated by about 8-9 percent. See, "1. Introduction", Page 1.)

== Transport ==
Only one national route passes through Keda, the Sh1 Batumi–Akhaltsikhe, an important connection between Adjara and Samtskhe-Javakheti across the Goderdzi Pass. Keda is served by minibuses (marshutkas) from Batumi.

== See also ==
- List of municipalities in Georgia (country)
- Adjara
