= List of mosques in Georgia =

List of mosques in Georgia may refer to:

- List of mosques in Georgia (country)
- List of mosques in Georgia (U.S. state)
