= Batumi Mosque =

Mosque in Batumi, Adjara, Georgia

- ბათუმის მეჩეთი
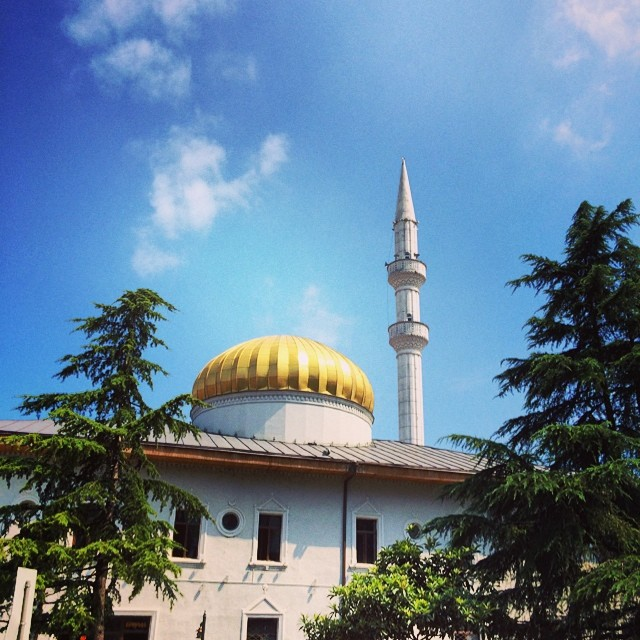

- Location within Adjara

Religion
- Affiliation: Islam
- Ecclesiastical or organizational status: Mosque
- Status: Active

Location
- Location: Batumi, Adjara
- Country: Georgia
- Interactive map of Batumi Mosque
- Coordinates: 41°38′55″N 41°38′38″E

Architecture
- Type: Mosque
- Style: Ottoman
- Founder: Aslan Beg Khimshiashvili (family)
- Completed: 1866

Specifications
- Dome: 1
- Minaret: 1
- Materials: Timber

The Batumi Mosque (Georgian: ბათუმის მეჩეთი) is a mosque in Batumi, Adjara, Georgia.

Batumi is a home to a sizable Muslim community. The mosque is popularly known as the "Jamia in the middle" (Georgian: ორთა ჯამე, romanized: Orta jame) for it once stood in between two other mosques which have not survived.

== History ==
The Batumi Mosque was commissioned in 1866 by the family of Aslan Beg Khimshiashvili, a prominent Muslim Georgian nobleman of Adjara. It became popularly known as the "Orta Jame" (Georgian: ორთა ჯამე, "middle mosque") because it stood between two other mosques in Batumi, both of which were later demolished.

During the Soviet era, the mosque was closed and converted into a military warehouse as part of the government’s anti-religious policies. It was returned to the local Muslim community in the late 20th century. Renovations were carried out in 1946, when a sahn and a minaret were added, and again in the 1990s, when further restoration and landscaping took place. The mosque reopened for worship in 1995 and has since remained an active religious center in Batumi.

== Architecture ==
The mosque was designed in the Ottoman style. It has a golden dome and white minarets. The windows of the building are arranged in two layers. It has wooden roof. The walls of the mosque were painted by the Laz brothers.

== Community and contemporary role ==
The mosque serves as the only active mosque in Batumi and functions as the main religious center for the city’s Muslim community. It hosts the five daily prayers and the weekly Friday Jumu'ah prayer. The mosque also operates a religious school where children study the Quran and local history. During major Islamic holidays such as Eid al-Fitr, festive prayers and communal gatherings are held, sometimes attended by the Mufti of Georgia and local officials. Due to its limited capacity, many worshippers are often compelled to pray outside in the surrounding streets.

For more than a decade, community leaders have advocated for the construction of a second mosque in Batumi, a request that remains unresolved in the courts. The mosque continues to be not only a place of worship but also a symbol of the community’s perseverance in maintaining its religious and cultural identity within Georgia.

== Gallery ==
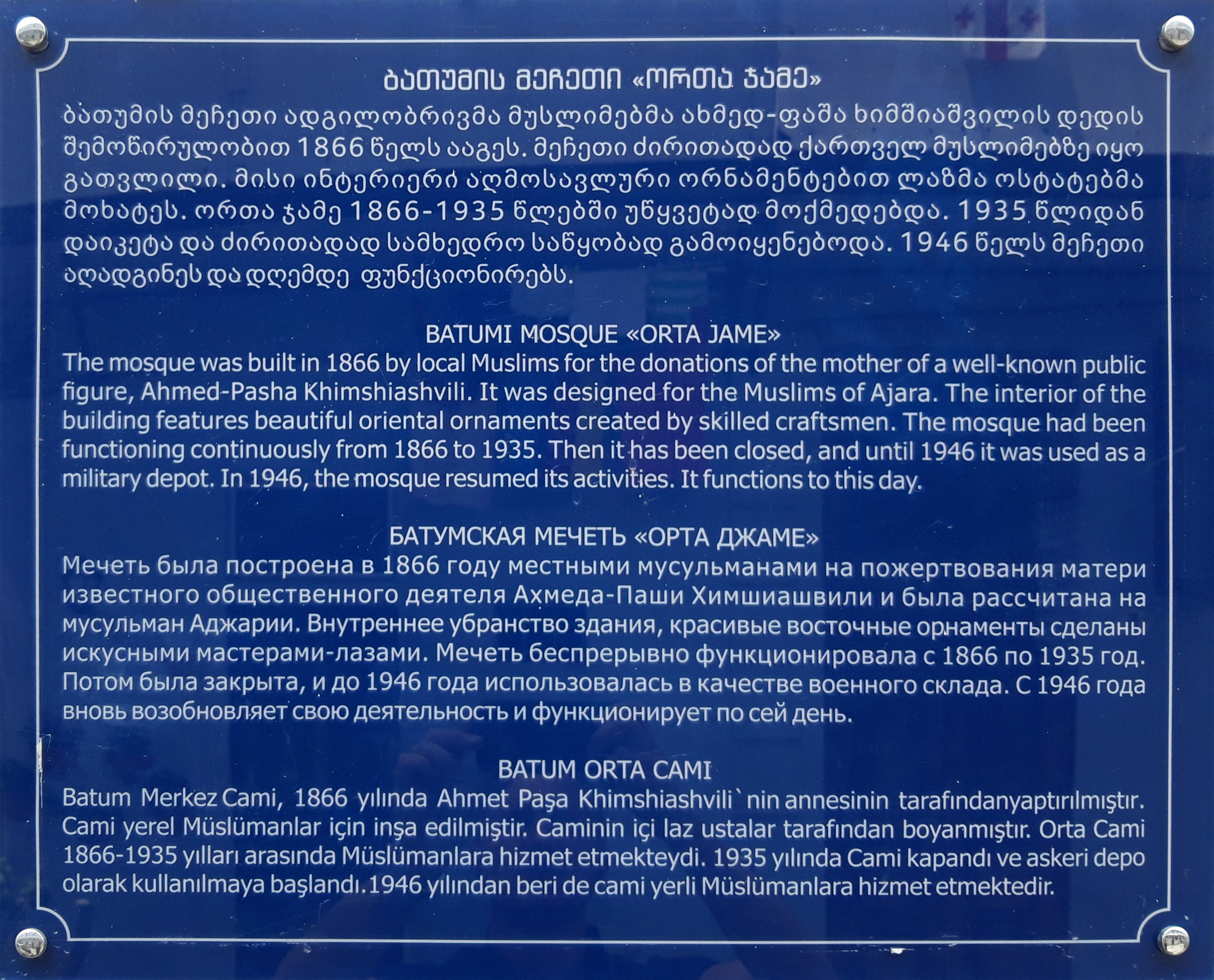

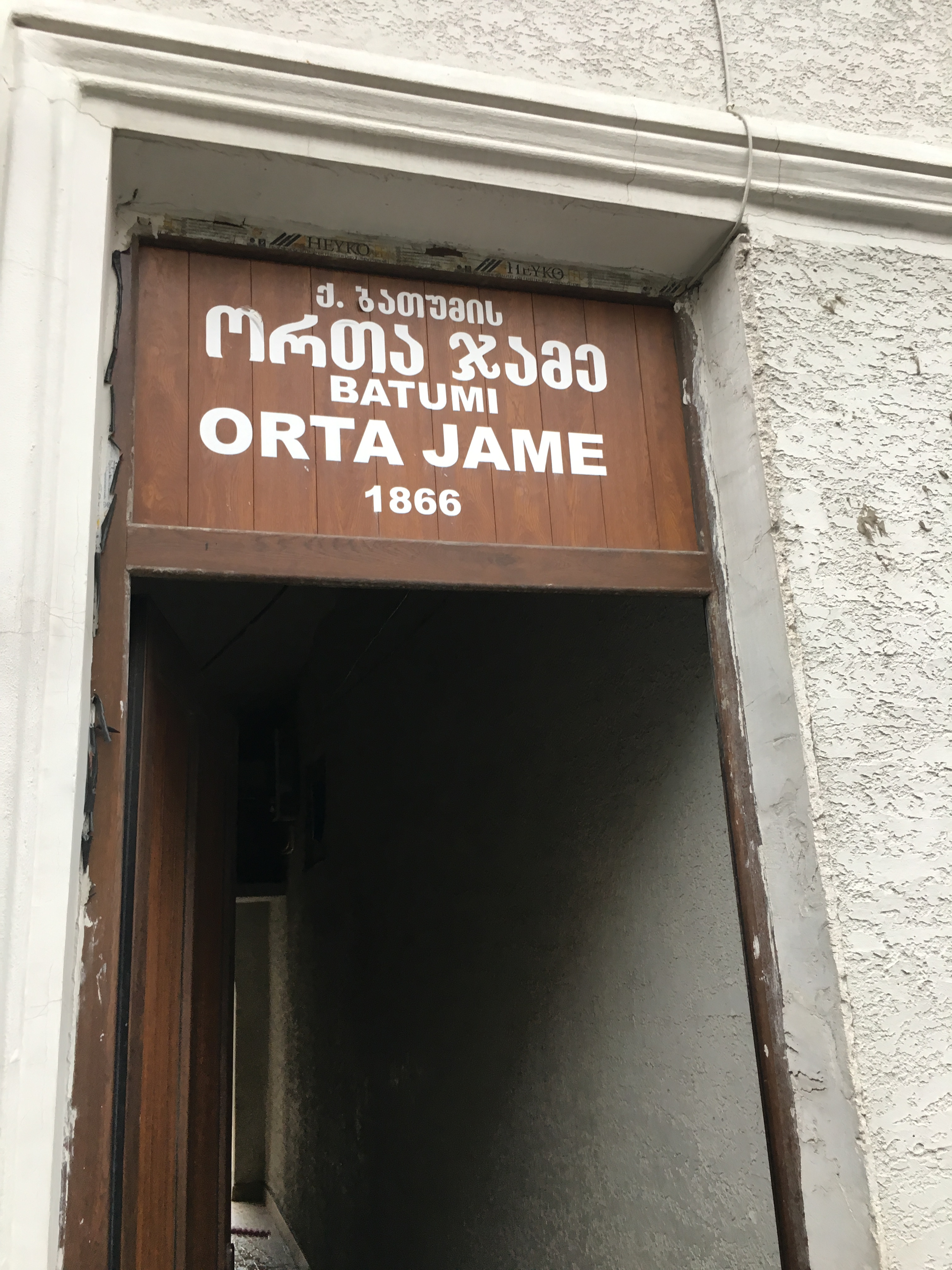
Mosque entrance from Kutaisi Street

== See also ==
- Islam in Georgia
- List of mosques in Georgia
