= Juma Mosque, Tbilisi =

Mosque in Tbilisi, Georgia

Juma Mosque
- ჯუმა მეჩეთი; Cümə məscidi
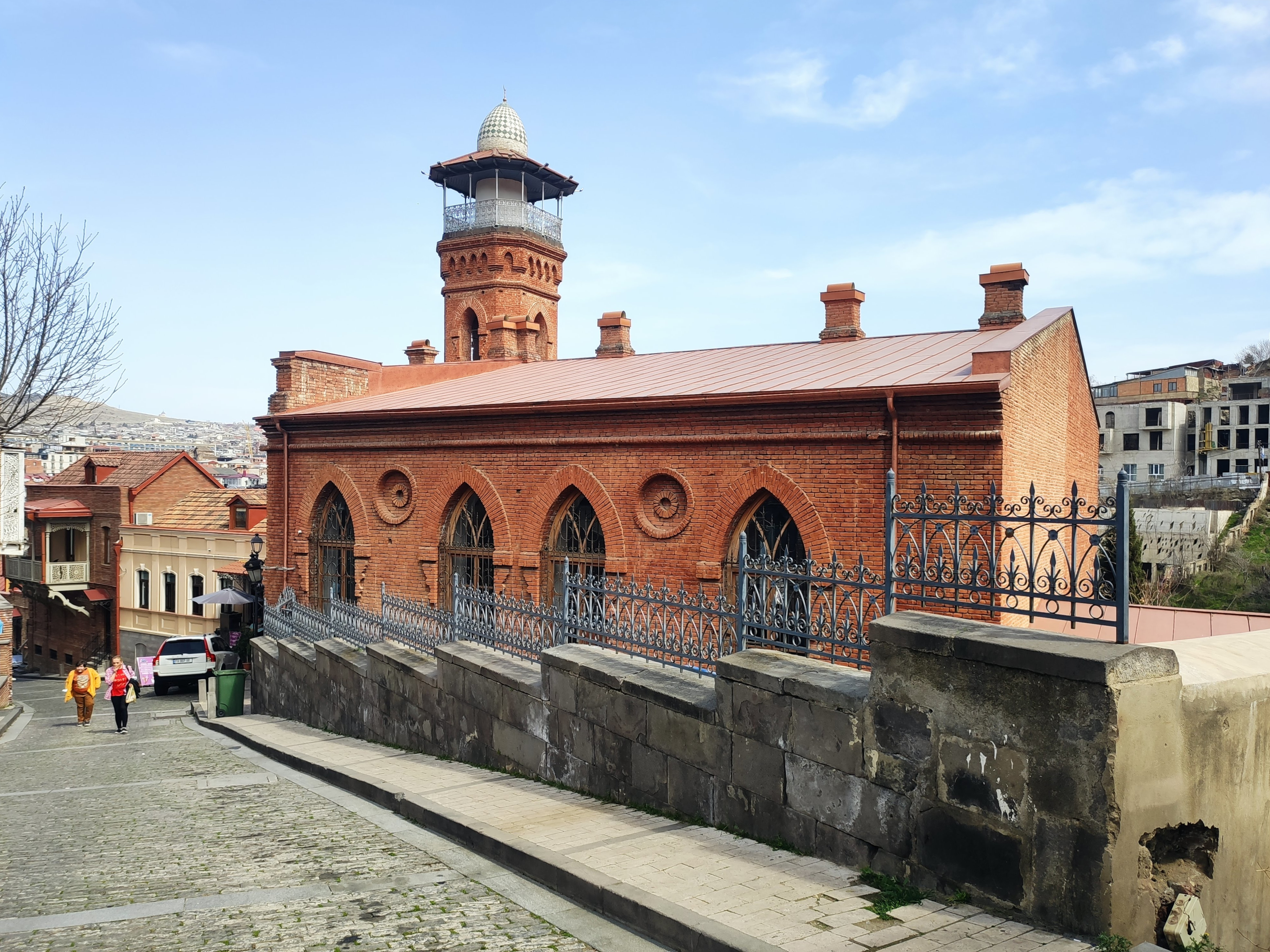
- The mosque in 2022

Religion
- Affiliation: Islam
- Ecclesiastical or organisational status: Mosque
- Status: Active

Location
- Location: Botanical Street, Old Tbilisi
- Country: Georgia
- Interactive map of Juma Mosque
- Coordinates: 41°41′14″N 44°48′37″E

Architecture
- Architect: Giovanni Scudieri (1851)
- Type: Mosque
- Style: Neo-Gothic; Islamic
- Funded by: Zeynalabdin Taghiyev (1895)
- Completed: 18th century (original); 1851 (rebuild); 1895 (current)
- Demolished: 1740s (since rebuilt)

Specifications
- Minaret: 1
- Materials: Red-brick

The Juma Mosque (Georgian: ჯუმა მეჩეთი; Azerbaijani: Cümə məscidi) is the only surviving mosque in the historic Old Town of Tbilisi, Georgia. Located at the foot of Narikala Fortress on Botanical Street, it is notable for its shared use by both Sunni and Shia Muslims.

== History ==
Muslims have lived in Tbilisi since the Arab conquest in the 7th century, and the city once had multiple mosques. The original Juma Mosque built by the Ottomans in the early 18th century, at the foot of Narikala Fortress, was destroyed by Persian forces in the 1740s, then rebuilt between 1846–1851 by the Italian architect Giovanni Scudieri. In 1895, funded by Azerbaijani philanthropist Zeynalabdin Taghiyev, it was rebuilt again in its current red-brick form. The mosque underwent restoration in 1998.

== Architecture ==
The mosque is constructed of red brick and combines Neo-Gothic and Islamic architectural elements. It features arched windows along its walls and an octagonal minaret visible from Botanical Street. Both the exterior and interior are decorated with colorful mosaics.

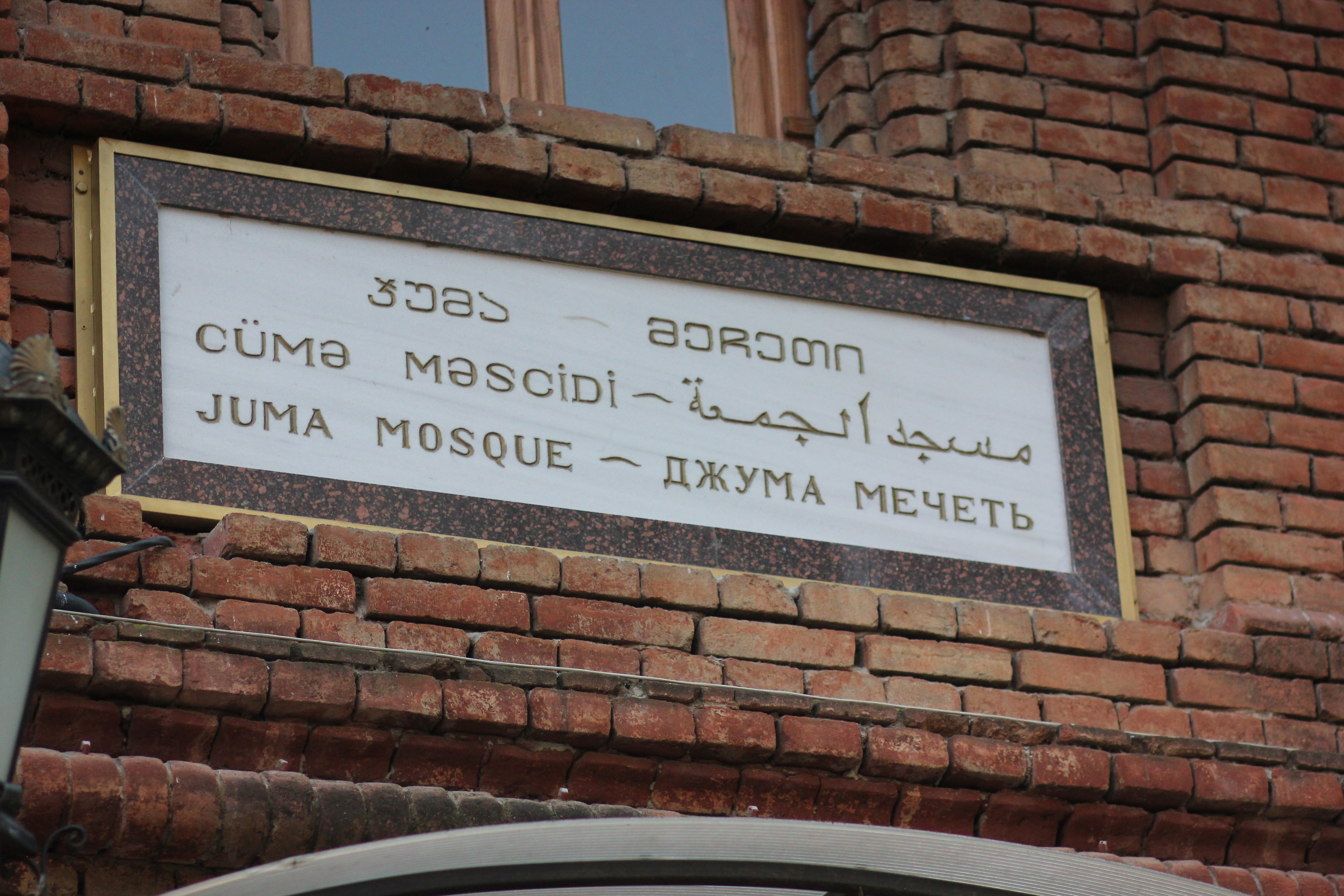
Entrance of the mosque listing the name in five languages (Georgian, Azerbaijani, Arabic, English, Russian)

== Religious significance and community use ==
Muharram in the mosque

The mosque serves both Sunni and Shia Muslims and is primarily used by the Azerbaijanis in Tbilisi. It was also used by Tatars during the Soviet Union. Originally separated by a curtain, Shias and Sunnis eventually began praying together in 1996, making it one of the few mosques where followers of the two main branches of Islam share a single prayer space. It is also the focal point for Friday prayers and celebrations of Eid al‑Adha and Eid al‑Fitr, drawing both local worshippers and tourists. It is subordinate to the Mufti of Azerbaijan.

The mosque stands among other religious landmarks in Old Tbilisi, including bathhouses, synagogues, and churches, exemplifying the city's long-standing tradition of religious diversity and tolerance.

== See also ==
- Islam in Georgia
- List of mosques in Georgia
