= List of mosques in Georgia (country) =

This is a list of mosques in Georgia.

Name	Images	Location	Year (CE)	Remarks
Shah Abbas Mosque		Metekhi, Tbilisi	16th century	Destroyed by Soviet authorities in 1951; Shia
Didachara mosque		Khulo Municipality, Adjara	1832	Wooden mosque, listed as a Cultural Monument of National Importance in 2006; Sunni
Akho Mosque		Akho, Adjara	1861	A wooden mosque; Sunni
Kvirike Mosque		Kvirike, Adjara	1861	A wooden mosque; Sunni
Batumi Mosque		Batumi	1866	The only surviving mosque in Batumi; Sunni
Tbilisi Juma Mosque		Old Tbilisi	1895	Original structure dates from the 18th century; rebuilt several times. Current structure dates from 1895; split between Shias and Sunnis
Varkhani Mosque		Varkhani, Adigeni	19th century	Sunni
Chao Mosque		Chao, Adjara	1912	A wooden mosque; Sunni
Duisi Mosque	Old Mosque, Duisi, Pankisi Gorge, Georgia	Duisi, Kakheti	1902	
Abu Bakr As-Siddik Mosque	New Mosque, Duisi, Pankisi Gorge, Georgia	Duisi, Kakheti	2002	
Ahlulbayt Mosque		Tbilisi		Shia
Imam Ali Mosque		Marneuli, Kvemo Kartli	18th	Shia
Imam Hussein Mosque		Marneuli, Kvemo Kartli	2016	Shia
Meore-Kesalo Mosque		Meore-Kesalo, Kvemo Kartli		Sunni

== See also ==
- Islam in Georgia
- Lists of mosques
