= Varjanauli Bridge =

Bridge in Kobuleti Municipality, Georgia

- ვარჯანაულის ხიდი
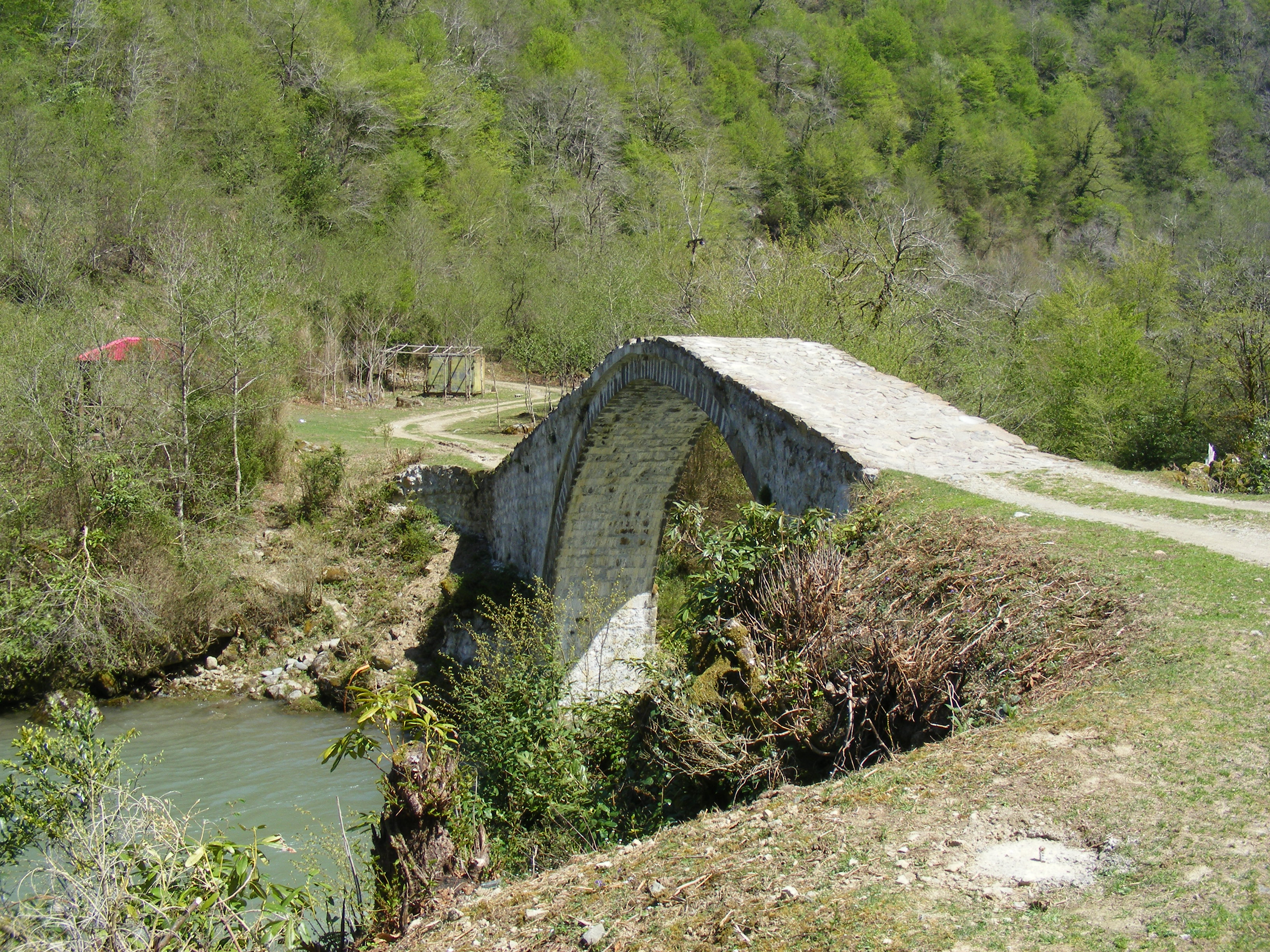
- Varjanauli Bridge
- Location: Kobuleti Municipality, Adjara, Georgia
- Coordinates: 41.788500°N 41.961250°E
- Type: Arch bridge

The Varjanauli Bridge (Georgian: ვარჯანაულის ხიდი, romanized: varjanaulis khidi) is a late medieval arch bridge in Georgia. It is located at the village of Varjanauli, some 20 km east of Kobuleti, in the forested Kintrishi river valley, in Georgia's southwestern Autonomous Republic of Adjara. The bridge is quite large and wide, with prominent semi-circular outline. It is built of hewn stone blocks, rough stones, and mortar. The bridge is inscribed on the list of the Immovable Cultural Monuments of National Significance of Georgia.

The exact date when the Varjanauli bridge was constructed is not known. According to a local tradition, it was commissioned by the local Muslim Georgian nobleman Tamaz-Oghli (Tamazashvili) in the 17th century. Voussoirs at both sides of the bridge are made of hewn stone and lime mortar. They are arranged in a vertical mode. The arch and the sides of the bridge are covered with a series of neatly hewn stone blocks. The bridge rests on abutments cut into the rock on both banks. The stones used for the lower face of the arch are packed symmetrically with the voussoirs, so that the arch looks like a monolith. The horizontal length of the bridge between the abutments is 14.6 m, while the roadway measures 28.1 m; width at the middle part is 2.6 m and near the abutments 3.5 m; height from the water level to the arch is 7.9 m and to the top of the arch 8.6m. Size of the holes for the arch-form are: 0.36 x 42 m and 0.38 x 0.32 m. The bridge underwent the government-funded conservation works in 2008.
