= Dandalo bridge =

Coordinates: 41°38′48″N 42°06′28″E

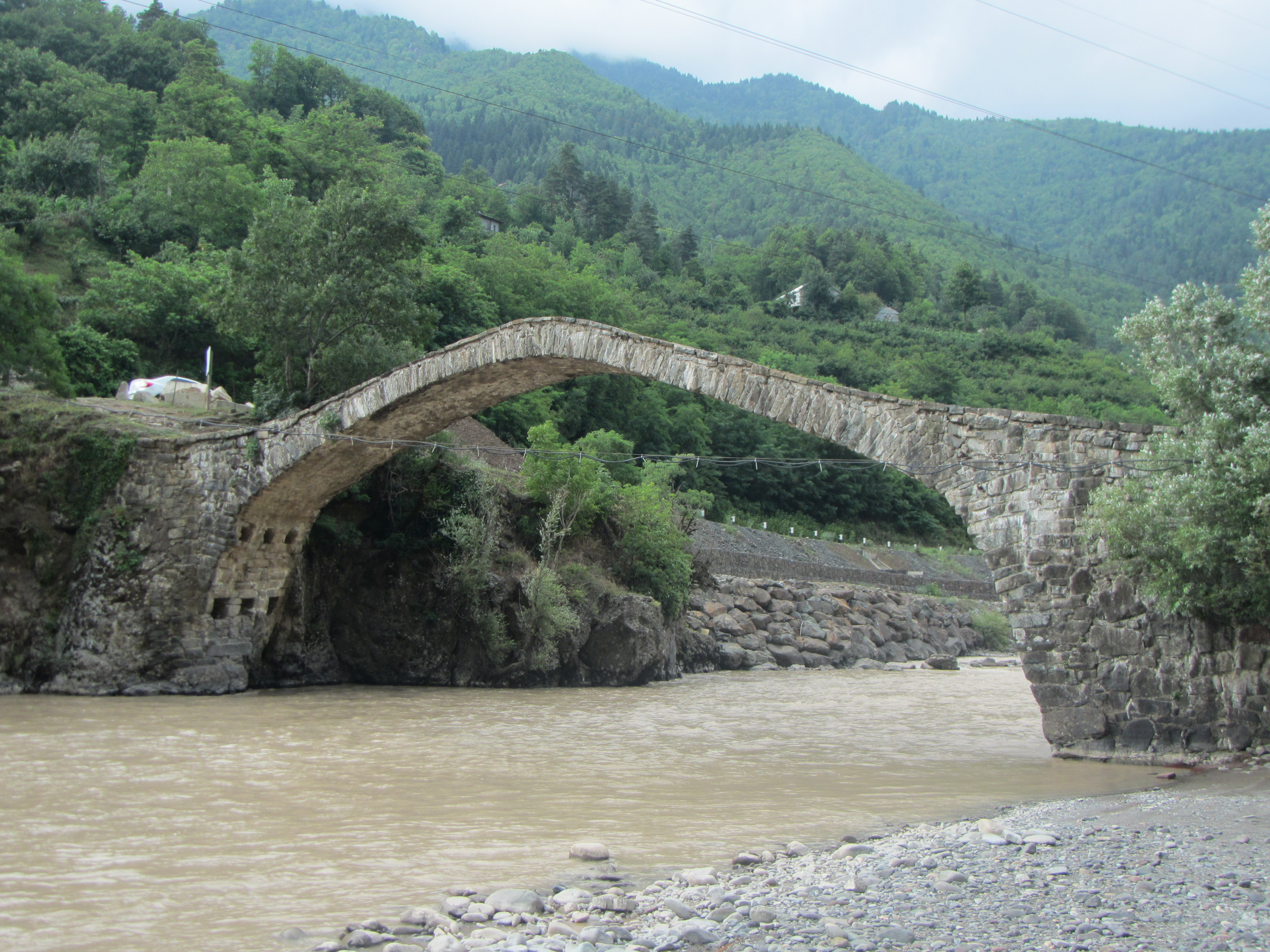

The Dandalo bridge (Georgian: დანდალოს ხიდი, romanized: dandalos khidi) is an arched medieval stone bridge over the Acharistsqali River, near the town of Dandalo in the nation of Georgia. It is a monument of national importance in Georgia.

== Location ==
The bridge is located on the Acharistsqali river, near the town of Dandalo, in the Keda municipality, Adjara, not far from the Batumi highway, 60 km east of the city.

== History ==
The construction of the Dandalo bridge dates back to the 11th–12th centuries, and it and was made of local stone.

== Description ==
The bridge is 20 metres (66 ft) long, and both sides are founded on rocks, which protects it from being washed away. The construction is considered an exemplary monument of Georgian arched stone bridges.

The bridge looks like a Latin letter S. In terms of construction techniques, it is much more difficult to build such a bridge, as loads are unevenly distributed.

In 2006, it was listed as a cultural monument of national importance in Georgia.

== Literature ==
- Sikharulidze I., Encyclopedia "Georgia", Vol. 2, p. 308, Tb., 2012.
- Kvezereli-Kopadze N. Old Bridges of Georgia, Tb., 1972
- I. Sikharulidze, "Monuments of Adjara Material Culture", Tbilisi, 1962, p. 38-39
