= Keda Municipality =

Coordinates: 41°34′N 41°57′E

Keda Municipality ქედის მუნიციპალიტეტი
- The Acharistsqali river, which flows through Keda

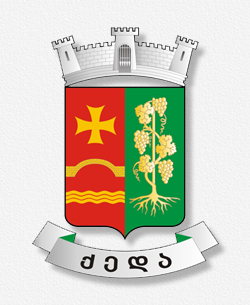
- Flag Seal

- Country: Georgia
- Autonomous Republic: Adjara
- Administrative centre: Keda

Government
  - Mayor: Roland Beridze (GD)

Area
  - Total: 452 km^{2} (175 sq mi)

Population (2024)
  - Total: 14,697
  - Density: 32.5/km^{2} (84.2/sq mi)
- Time zone: UTC+4 (Georgian Time)
- Website: keda.gov.ge

Keda (Georgian: ქედის მუნიციპალიტეტი), Keda Municiṕaliťeťi) is a municipality in Georgia's southwestern autonomous republic of Adjara with a population of 16,700 people (2021). It covers an area of 452 km^{2} (175 sq mi) and the daba ('Urban-type settlement') Keda is its administrative centre.

Historical monuments in the municipality include the medieval Orthodox churches at Makhuntseti, Zesopeli, and Namonastrevi, and the bridges of Tsoniarisi and Dandalo.

== Geography ==
Keda borders the municipalities of Khelvachauri to the south and west, Kobuleti to the northwest and Shuakhevi to the east. The municipality also has a 17 kilometer long border with Turkey in the south, where the Shavsheti Range forms the natural border. The Meskheti Range forms the municipality's northwestern border with Kobuleti. Adjara's main river, the Acharistsqali (literally "river of Adjara") flows for 42 kilometres (26 mi) from east to west through Keda. The river gorge has a Mediterranean subtropical climate. As the elevation increases, the climate becomes humid, with annual rainfall of around 1500mm per year, providing green vegetation.

The total area of the municipality is 452 km^{2} (175 sq mi). The administrative center of Keda is located on the bank of the Acharistsqali at an altitude of 256 metres (840 ft) above sea level, while Mount Ghoma at 2,441 metres (8,009 ft) is the highest point, located near the border with Turkey.

== Administrative divisions ==
Keda Municipality is administratively divided into 10 communities (თემი, temi) with 63 villages (სოფელი, sopeli). There is one urban-type settlement (დაბა, daba), the municipal centre Keda.

Rank	Administrative unit	Population
1	Keda	3,538
2	Tskhmorisi	2,099
3	Makhuntseti	1,871
4	Dandalo	1,693
5	Pirveli Maisi	1,126
6	Zvari	1,093
7	Tsoniarisi	1,030
8	Merisi	845
9	Dologani	781
10	Oktomberi	621

== Population ==
The population of Keda Municipality is 16,700 according to the 2021 estimate, which is a minimal decrease compared to the last census of 2014. The municipal center of Keda has experienced a relatively significant population decline since 2014, dropping from 1,510 to 1,285 residents in 2021. The population density is 36.9 people per square kilometer.

According to the 2014 census, the population of Keda consisted for 62% of Muslim Georgians, followed by Georgians belonging to the Georgian Orthodox Church (31%). There are no significant ethnic minorities.

Population Keda Municipality
	1923	1939	1959	1970	1979	1989	2002	2014	2021
Keda Municipality	-	13,392	▲17,204	▲19,065	▲19,232	▼19,928	▲20,024	▼16,760	▼16,700
Keda (daba)	124	▲624	▲627	▼595	▲815	▲1,197	▲1,244	▲1,510	▼1,285
Data: Population statistics Georgia 1897 to present. Note: (Note: The 2014 census found an inexplicable gap with the data from the national statistical office Geostat. UN-assisted research has found the 2002 census was inflated by about 8-9 percent. See, "1. Introduction", Page 1.)

== Politics ==
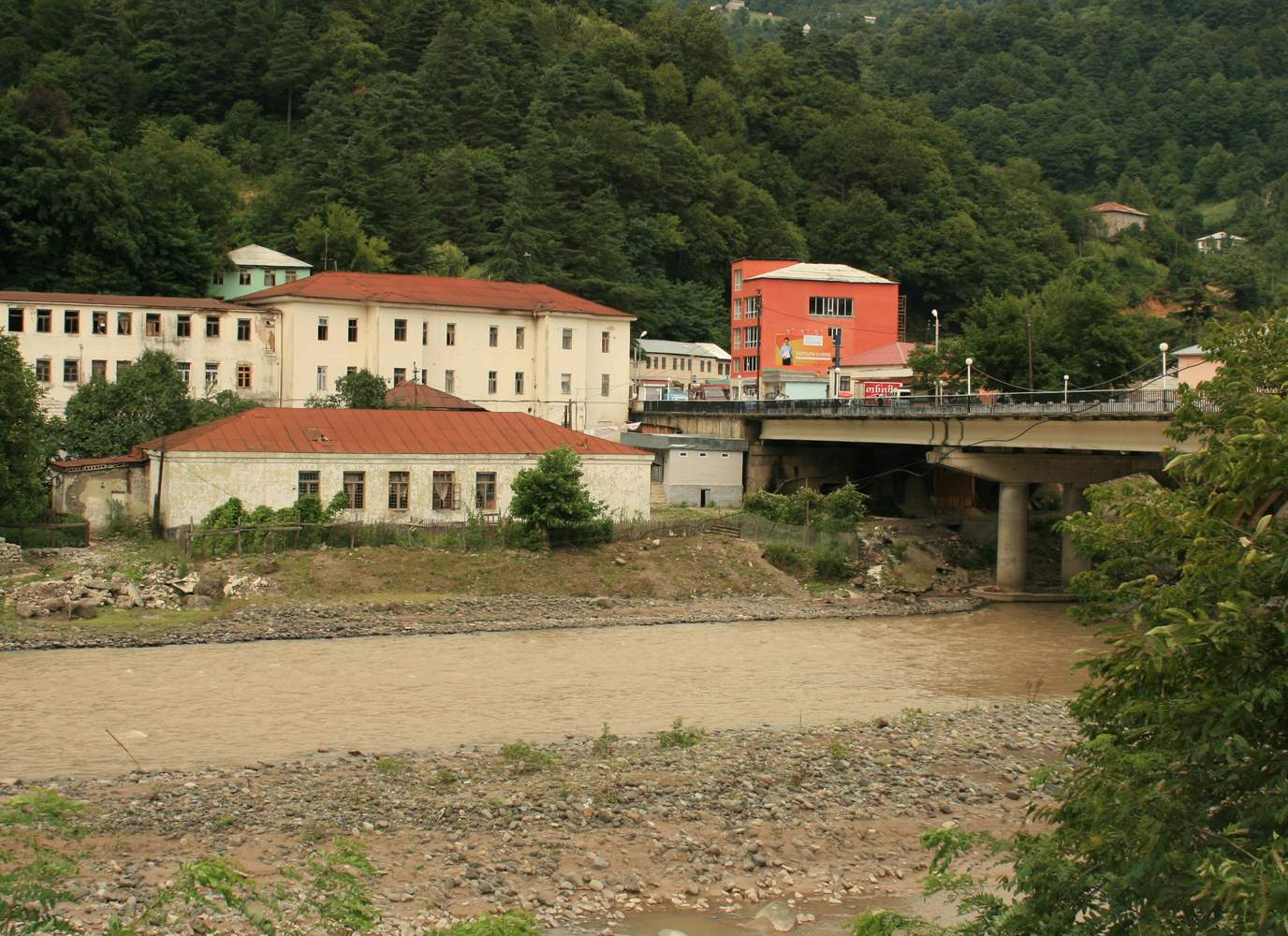
Keda town

The Keda Municipal Assembly (Georgian: ქედის საკრებულო, Keda Sakrebulo) is a representative body in Keda Municipality consisting of 21 members, elected every four years. The last election was held in October 2021. Roland Beridze of the Georgian Dream party was elected mayor.

Party	2017	2021	Current Municipal Assembly
Georgian Dream	18	15	
United National Movement	3	4	
For Georgia		1	
Lelo		1	
Alliance of Patriots	2		
European Georgia	1		
Total	24	21	

== See also ==
- List of municipalities in Georgia (country)
