= Adjara State Museum =

Museum in Batumi, Adjara, Georgia

Coordinates: 41.647312°N 41.633206°E

The Adjara State Museum (Georgian: აჭარის სახელმწიფო მუზეუმი) is a museum in the city of Batumi in Adjara, Georgia.

== See also ==
- List of museums in Georgia (country)
