= Juma Mosque, Balaken =

Mosque in Balakən, Azerbaijan

Juma Mosque
- Azerbaijani: Balakən Cümə Məscidi; Arabic: مسجد الجمعة (بالاكن)
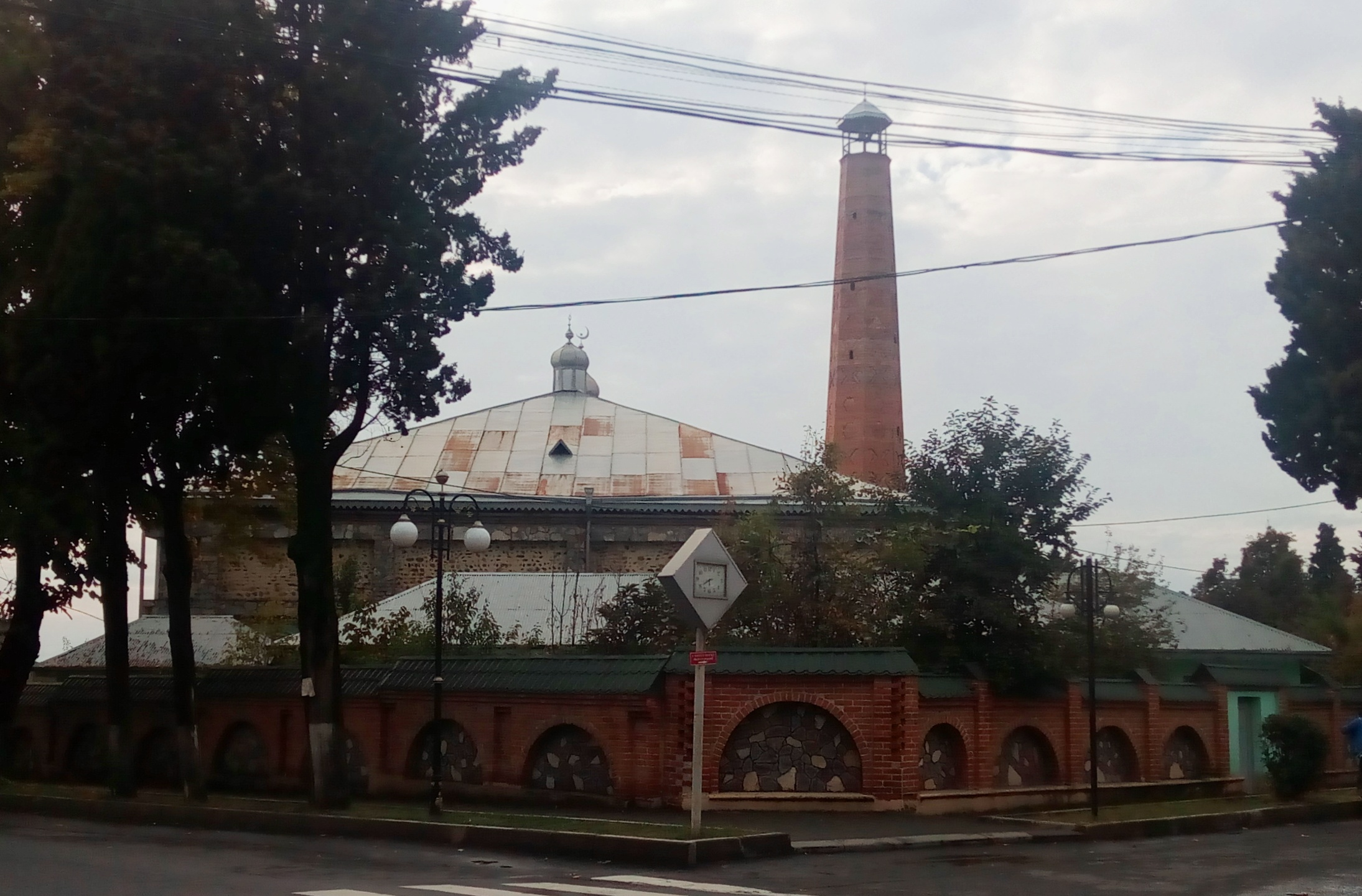
- The mosque in 2017

- Location of the mosque in Azerbaijan

Religion
- Affiliation: Islam
- Ecclesiastical or organisational status: Mosque (1877–1928); Profane use (1928–1947); Mosque (since 1947)
- Status: Active

Location
- Location: Mahammad Asadov Street, Balakan
- Country: Azerbaijan
- Coordinates: 41°43′28″N 46°24′21″E

Architecture
- Type: Mosque architecture
- Groundbreaking: 1867
- Completed: 1877

Specifications
- Interior area: 1,025 m^{2} (11,030 sq ft)
- Minaret: One
- Minaret height: 44 m (144 ft)
- Inscriptions: Four (maybe more)
- Materials: Stone; brick; lime; egg yolk

The Juma Mosque (Azerbaijani: Balakən Cümə Məscidi; Arabic: مسجد الجمعة (بالاكن)), also known as the Minaret Mosque, is a mosque and historical architectural monument, located in the city of Balakən, Azerbaijan. The construction of the mosque commenced in 1867 and was completed in 1877.

The mosque was included in the list of immovable historical and cultural monuments of national importance by the decision No. 132 of the Cabinet of Ministers of the Republic of Azerbaijan on August 2, 2001.

== History ==
The Balakan Juma Mosque is located on Mahammad Asadov Street in the city of Balakən. According to the inscription on the mosque, its construction began in 1867 and was completed in 1877. Four inscriptions in Arabic are placed on the northwest facade of the monument. These inscriptions detail the individuals who initiated the mosque's construction, the date of its construction, the name of the master who built the building, and the person who donated the land for its construction.

Qazi Mahammad Dabir, whose name is inscribed in the upper left corner of the mosque's entrance, was a renowned religious figure in the region during the 19th century. Another individual mentioned, Master Omar Ilisulu, was a famous craftsman of his time. He was also the builder of the Great Bridge and other historical monuments.

After the Soviet occupation in Azerbaijan, an official campaign against religion began in 1928. In December of that year, the Central Committee of the Communist Party of Azerbaijan handed over many mosques, churches, and synagogues to clubs for educational purposes. While there were 3,000 mosques in Azerbaijan in 1917, this number decreased to 1,700 in 1927, 1,369 in 1928, and just 17 by 1933. During this period, the Balakan Juma Mosque was also closed for worship and used as a storage facility. In 1947, the mosque was returned to the faithful for religious use. The mosque underwent repairs in 1955, 1980, and 1996.

After Azerbaijan regained its independence, the mosque was included in the list of immovable historical and cultural monuments of national importance by the decision No. 132 of the Cabinet of Ministers of the Republic of Azerbaijan on August 2, 2001.

== İnscriptions ==
On the second inscription, written in Thuluth script on the stone at the right side of the entrance of the mosque reads, when translated into English:

In the 13th century of the Hijri calendar, all the people of Balakan, including high-ranking officials, reached an agreement to consider everyone's wishes and build a beautiful and eye-catching Juma Mosque that would attract the attention of all.

In the upper left corner of the entrance to the mosque, on a rectangular plaque, the following words are written, translated into English as:

With the help of the Great Allah, the wishes of the people were fulfilled, and this house was illuminated with the light of the Prophet (PBUH), attracting all Muslims to it. Qazi Mahammad Dabir and the builder Master Omar Ilisulu, for the sake of Allah, called upon everyone to make efforts in the subsequent restoration work of the mosque.

On the edges of the frame, the following note, translated into English from Thuluth, reads:

May Allah forgive the sinner; the land needed for the mosque, its chambers, and other structures was endowed by Leki bin Hallaj Muhammad.

== Architecture ==
The mosque's building is constructed from river stones, while its minaret is made of baked bricks. Lime and egg yolk were used in the construction. The mosque's layout is rectangular both inside and outside, covering an area of 1,025 m^{2} (11,030 sq ft). The minaret, which is 44 m (144 ft) tall, was built separately from the main building. It has an octagonal shape and is adorned with vegetal ornaments. As the minaret rises, it narrows, which makes it more resistant to natural forces.

The courtyard area is 3,000 m^{2} (32,000 sq ft), and the interior measures 40 by 23 m (131 by 75 ft). The height from the floor to the ceiling is 8 m (26 ft). At the front of the entrance doors, there is a porch consisting of six columns and seven arches. The prayer hall contains 12 columns, 26 arches, and 16 windows. The columns are made of baked brick. The mosque has three entrance doors, and above each door, inscriptions are engraved. The mosque's minbar is made of wood.

== See also ==
- Islam in Azerbaijan
- List of mosques in Azerbaijan
