= Juma Mosque, Qabala =

Mosque in Qabala, Azerbaijan

Juma Mosque
- Cümə Məscidi
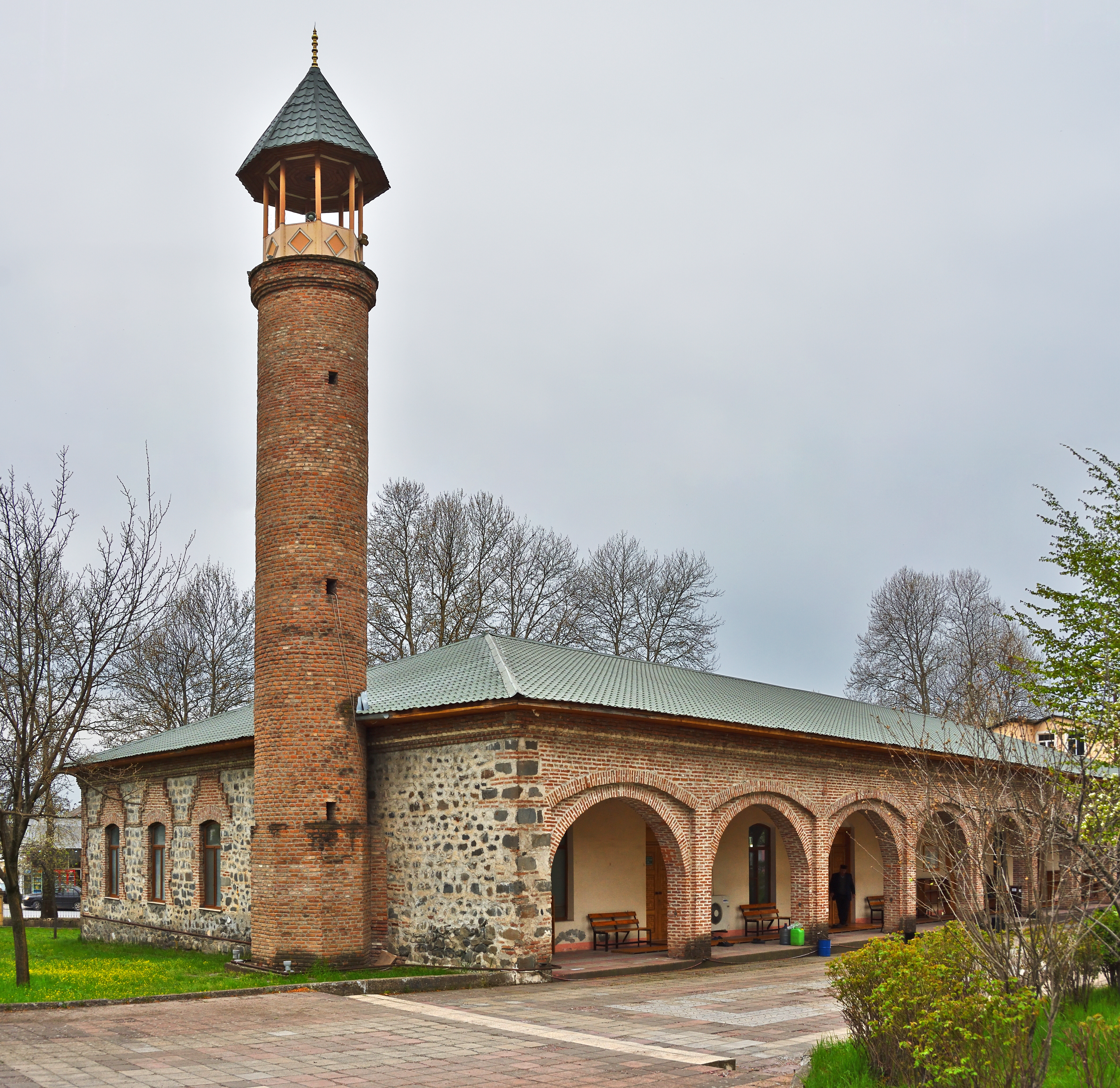
- The mosque in 2019

- Location of the mosque in Azerbaijan

Religion
- Affiliation: Islam
- Ecclesiastical or organizational status: Mosque (1906–1928); Profane use (1928–c. 1992); Mosque (since c. 1992)
- Status: Active

Location
- Location: Nizami Street, 1, Qabala
- Country: Azerbaijan
- Interactive map of Juma Mosque
- Coordinates: 40°58′46″N 47°51′00″E

Architecture
- Architect: Master Salman
- Type: Mosque architecture
- Groundbreaking: 1899
- Completed: 1906

Specifications
- Interior area: 42 by 20 m (138 by 66 ft)
- Minaret: One
- Materials: Stone; brick; timber; white metal

The Juma Mosque (Azerbaijani: Cümə Məscidi) is a mosque and historical architectural monument from the 19th–20th centuries, located in the city of Qabala, Azerbaijan.

The mosque was included in the list of immovable historical and cultural monuments of local significance by the decision No. 132 of the Cabinet of Ministers of the Republic of Azerbaijan on August 2, 2001.

== History ==
=== Early years ===
Construction of the Juma Mosque began in 1898. The mosque was built in the city of Qabala with the help of the local population and under the leadership of master Salam from Shaki.

=== Soviet occupation ===
After the Soviet occupation of Azerbaijan, an official campaign against religion began in 1928. In December of that year, the Central Committee of the Communist Party of Azerbaijan handed over many mosques, churches, and synagogues to clubs for educational purposes. While there were 3,000 mosques in Azerbaijan in 1917, the number had decreased to 1,700 in 1927, 1,369 in 1928, and only 17 by 1933.

The Juma Mosque of Qabala was closed for worship during this period. All the mosque's property was confiscated, and the religious and scientific books in the building were burned. For a time, court sessions were held in the mosque, and later, it was used as a club. From 1983 to 1985, the Scientific-Restoration Production Department of the Ministry of Culture of the Azerbaijan SSR carried out repair and restoration work on the mosque. After the restoration, the building housed the Qabala District History and Local Lore Museum.

=== After independence ===
After Azerbaijan regained its independence, the mosque was included in the list of immovable historical and cultural monuments of local significance by the decision No. 132 of the Cabinet of Ministers of the Republic of Azerbaijan on August 2, 2001.

In 2004, the mosque building was vacated and underwent major renovations. In 2005, it was returned to the faithful for religious use. A registered religious community operates within the mosque.

== Architecture ==
Baked bricks, river stones, and forest wood were used in the construction of the mosque. The wooden materials for the mosque's interior and the roof covering were sent by the famous philanthropist Haji Zeynalabdin Taghiyev to support its construction. Haji Mahammad, a philanthropist from Qabala, also helped raise the necessary funds for the mosque's construction. The Transcaucasian Spiritual Administration also contributed to the construction. The mosque's interior measures 42 by 20 m (138 by 66 ft). It does not have a dome, and its minaret is round and made of baked brick. The dome of the minaret is covered with white metal sheets and has an octagonal shape. The roof of the mosque is also covered with white metal sheets. The mosque was opened for public use in 1906.

== See also ==
- Islam in Azerbaijan
- List of mosques in Azerbaijan
