= Acharistsqali =

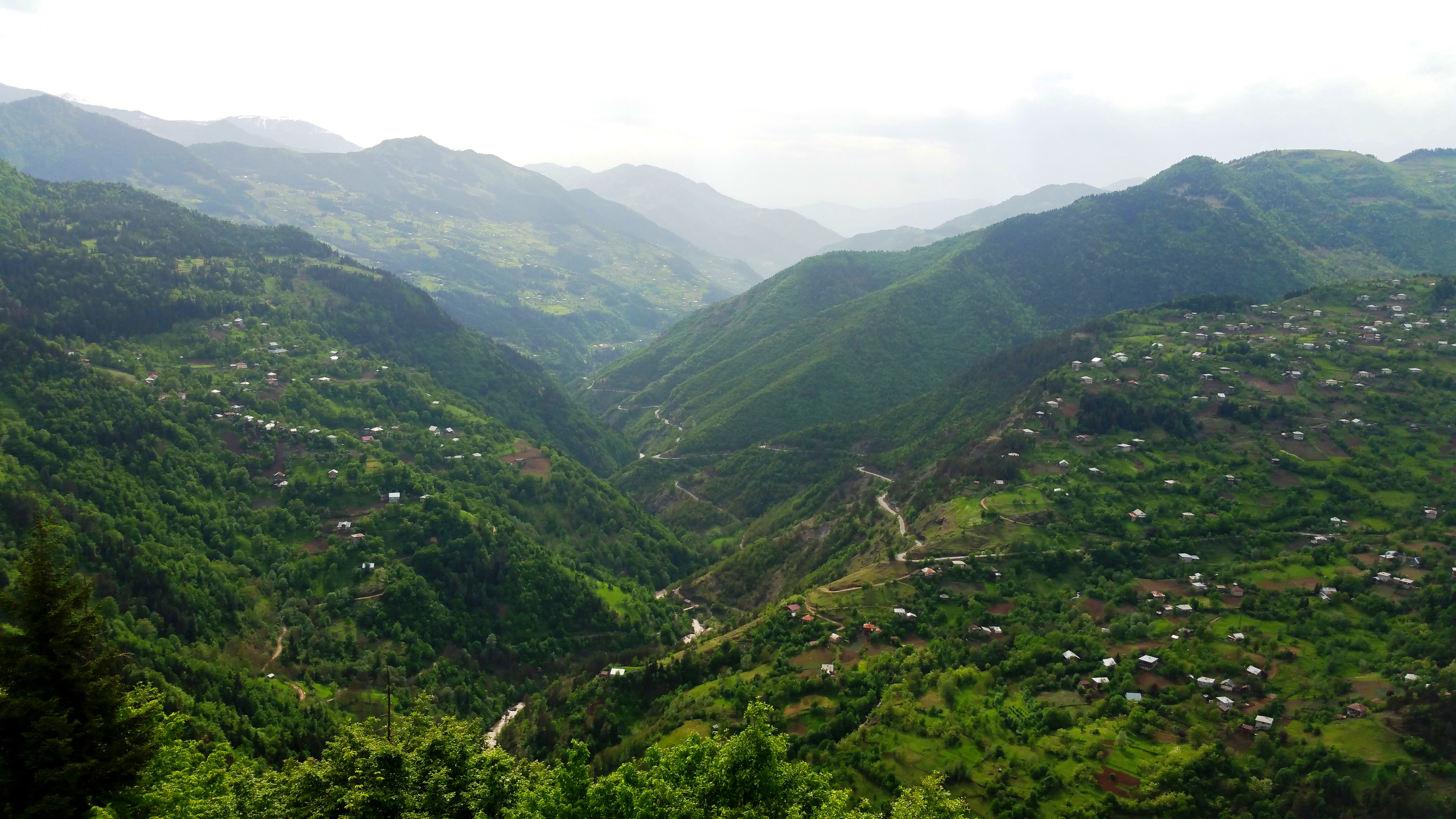
- Acharistskali Gorge near Khulo.

- Native name: აჭარისწყალი (Georgian)

Location
- Country: Georgia
- State: Adjara

Physical characteristics
- Source: Caucasus Mountains
- Mouth: Çoruh
  - coordinates: 41°32′28″N 41°43′10″E
- Length: 90 km (56 mi)
- Basin size: 1,540 km^{2} (590 sq mi)

Acharistsqali (Georgian: აჭარისწყალი - literal meaning: Adjara's water) is a river of southwestern Georgia. It is a right tributary of the river Çoruh (Chorokhi), which flows into the Black Sea. It is 90 kilometres (56 mi) long, and has a drainage basin of 1,540 square kilometres (590 sq mi).
