= Islam in Georgia (country) =

Islam in Europe by percentage of country population 95–100%: Azerbaijan; 90–95%: Turkey; Kosovo; 50–70%: Albania; Bosnia and Herzegovina; Kazakhstan; 30–35%: North Macedonia; 10–20%: France; Sweden; Georgia; Montenegro; 5–10%: Austria; Belgium; Bulgaria; Denmark; Germany; Liechtenstein; Luxembourg; Netherlands; Russia; Switzerland; United Kingdom; Spain; Greece; 4–5%: Serbia; 2–4%: Italy; Finland; Norway; Malta; Slovenia; Cyprus (Note: Only takes into account the Muslim population residing on land controlled by the Republic of Cyprus.); 1–2%: Croatia; Ireland; Ukraine; Andorra; < 1%: Iceland; Armenia; Belarus; Czech Republic; Estonia; Hungary; Latvia; Lithuania; Moldova; Monaco; Poland; Portugal; Romania; San Marino; Slovakia

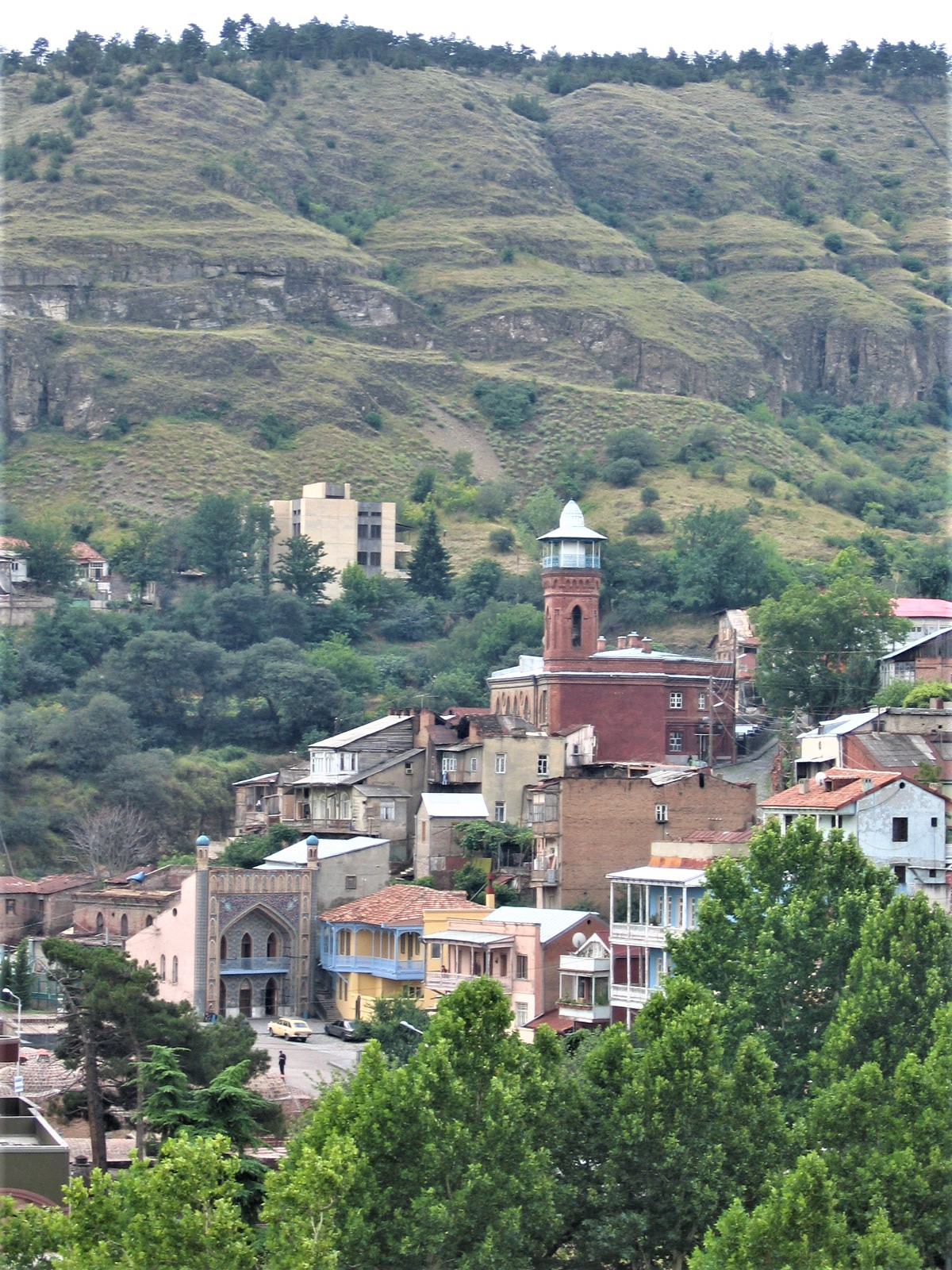
Central Mosque in Tbilisi

Islam in Georgia (Georgian: ისლამი საქართველოში, romanized: islami sakartveloshi) was introduced in 654 when an army sent by the Third Caliph of Islam, Uthman, conquered Eastern Georgia and established Muslim rule in Tbilisi. Currently, Muslims constitute approximately 9.9% of the Georgian population. According to other sources, Muslims constitute 10-11% of Georgia's population.

In July 2011, the Parliament of Georgia passed new law allowing religious minority groups with "historic ties to Georgia" to register. The draft of the law specifically mentions Islam and four other religious communities.

Mosques in Georgia operate under the supervision of the Georgian Muslim Department, established in May 2011. Until then the affairs of Georgia's Muslims had been governed from abroad by the Baku-based Caucasus Muslims Department.

In 2010, Turkey and Georgia signed an agreement by which Turkey would provide funding and expertise to rehabilitate three mosques and to rebuild a fourth one in Georgia, while Georgia would rehabilitate four Georgian monasteries in Turkey. The Georgia-Turkey agreement will allow the reconstruction of the historical Azize mosque in Batumi, Ajaria demolished in the middle of the last century. Turkey will rehabilitate the mosques at Samtskhe-Javakheti and Akhaltsikhe regions, Kobuleti District, build the Azize mosque that burned down in 1940 and restore the Turkish bathhouse in Batumi.

== History ==
=== Context ===
The prevalent faith in modern-day Georgia is Orthodox Christianity, despite the country being geographically enclosed by the Islamic world. Simultaneously, the Middle Ages and the early modern period witnessed substantial interactions with the Islamic world, fostering conditions conducive to the propagation of Islam in Georgia.

=== Emirate of Tbilisi ===
The Arabs first appeared in Georgia in 645. It was not, however, until 735, when they succeeded in establishing their firm control over a large portion of the country. In that year, Marwan II took hold of Tbilisi and much of the neighbouring lands and installed there an Arab emir, who was to be confirmed by the Caliph of Baghdad or, occasionally, by the ostikan of Armīniya. After the formation of the Emirate of Tbilisi, Arabic historical sources provide evidence of the use of the terms nisbas at-Tiflisi or at-Taflisi.

During the Arab period, Tbilisi (al-Tefelis) grew into a center of trade between the Islamic world and Europe in the north. Beyond that, it functioned as a key Arab outpost and a buffer province facing the Byzantine and Khazar dominions. Upon the recapture of Tbilisi by Georgian King David IV in 1122, it was reinstated as the capital of the reunified Georgian state under the Bagrationi dynasty. Nevertheless, a noteworthy Muslim minority persisted in the city.

=== Timurids ===
Between 1386 and 1404, Georgia was subjected to invasions by the armies of Turco-Mongol conqueror Timur, whose vast empire stretched, at its greatest extent, from Central Asia into Anatolia. In the first of at least seven invasions, Timur sacked Georgia's capital, Tbilisi, and captured the king Bagrat V in 1386. In late 1401, Timur invaded the Caucasus once again. The King of Georgia had to sue for peace, and sent his brother with the contributions. Timur was preparing for a major confrontation with the Ottoman dynasty and apparently wished to freeze the currently prevailing situation in Georgia, until he could return to deal with it more decisively and thoroughly at his leisure. Thus, he made peace with George on condition that the king of Georgia supply him with troops.

=== Ottoman Empire and Iranian Period ===
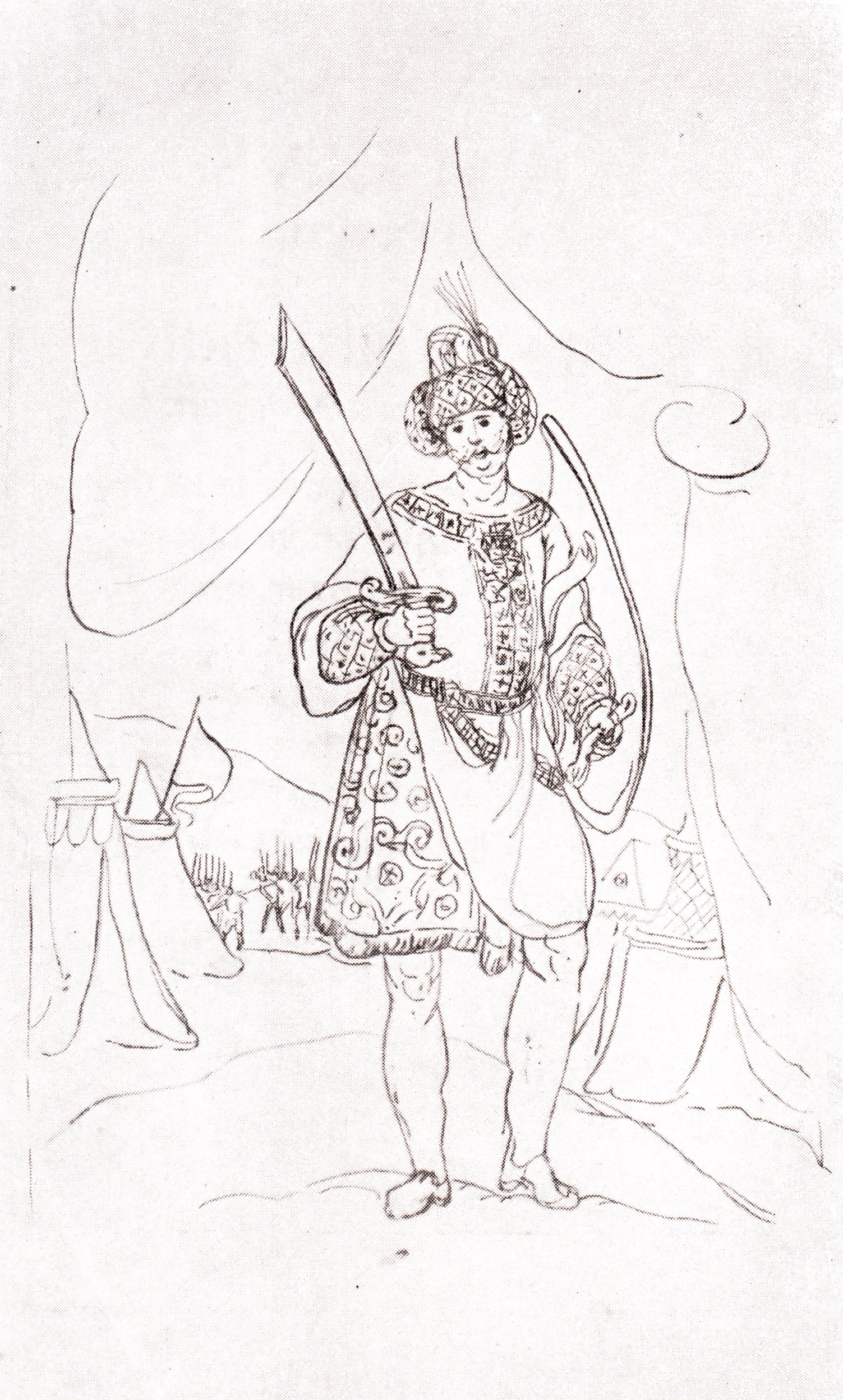
Rostom of Kartli, a Muslim Georgian ruler of the 17th century appointed by the Iranian Safavids.

The Safavid dynasty was in constant conflict with the Ottomans over full control and influence in the Caucasus. From the early 16th to the course of the second half of the 18th century, the Safavids had to deal with several independent kingdoms and principalities, as Georgia was not a single state at the time. These entities often followed divergent political courses. Safavid interests were largely directed at Eastern (the kingdoms of Kartli and Kakheti) and Southern (the kingdoms of Samtskhe-Saatabago) Georgia while Western Georgia came under Ottoman influence. These independent kingdoms became vassals of Persia as early as in 1503.

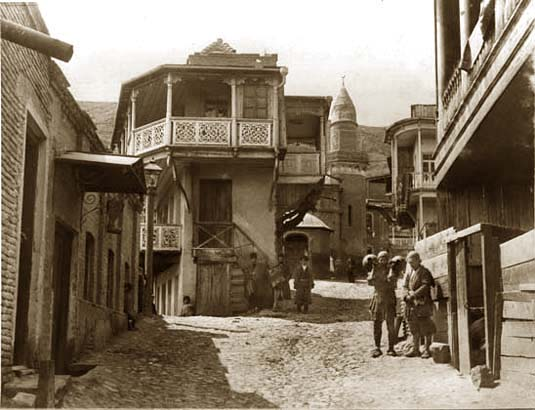
Botanical Street and Sunnite Mosque. Middle of 1880

On May 29, 1555, the Safavids and the Ottoman Empire concluded a treaty at Amasya following the Ottoman–Safavid War (1532–55) by which the Caucasus was divided between the two. Western Georgia and the western part of southern Georgia fell to The Ottomans, while Eastern Georgia (comprising the kingdoms of Kartli and Kakheti) and the (largest) eastern part of southern Georgia fell to Safavid Iran. The bulk of Georgia and the region which had historically always been the most dominant stayed therefore in the Iranian sphere. This partition of the Caucasus and therefore including Georgia under Islamic rule was again confirmed in 1639.

The religious approach diverged between the Ottomans and Iranians in their governance of Georgia. While the Ottomans leaned towards the complete Islamization of the Southwest Georgian populace or a hands-off approach in certain western provinces, the Iranians focused on converting the elite class in the eastern region without influencing the predominant Christian majority among the population. For several centuries, the Georgian kings and aristocrats converted to Islam and served as courtiers to the Iranian Safavid, Afsharid and Qajar dynasties, who ruled them.

In the regions of southern and western Georgia, where Ottoman rule held direct sway, a distinct scenario unfolded. The triumph of Ottoman dominance over South Georgia (referred to in Georgian as Samtskhe-Saatabago/Meskheti) represented a significant setback for feudal Georgia. This historical period witnessed the gradual diffusion of Islam across various rural segments of the populace. Its initial penetration occurred in the aforementioned southwest region of Georgia, notably with the establishment of the Ottoman pashalik of Akhaltsikhe (Childir). Ethnolinguistic minorities within the country also embraced Islam, a phenomenon further catalyzed by the influx of Turkic-speaking Muslim communities.

The western sector of this region, designated as Adjara, underwent a challenging process of Islamization. In the sixteenth century, as per the Ottoman census of mountainous Adjara, the majority of inhabitants adhered to Christianity, subject to religious taxes. Notably, the initial conversion to Islam primarily involved the nobility. The comprehensive Islamization of the entire population, however, reached fruition only by the closing years of the eighteenth century.

=== Under the Russian Empire ===
The nineteenth century marked a significant turning point in Georgia's interactions with the Islamic world, primarily shaped by its integration into the Russian Empire. This transition gradually weakened the influence of the Ottoman Empire in western Georgia and Iran in the east. Despite these shifts, Georgia continued to hold strategic importance in the foreign policies of both Iran and the Ottoman Empire, a consequence of territorial changes resulting from the Russo-Iranian and Russo-Turkish conflicts that saw a substantial part of the South Caucasus absorbed into the Russian Empire.

The historian Giorgi Sanikidze explains that understanding the demographic composition of nineteenth-century Georgia poses challenges, especially in determining the exact number of Muslims, their ethnic backgrounds, and the dynamics of demographic changes. Historical records often make it difficult to distinguish between ethnic Persians, Turkic-speaking Muslims (later known as Azerbaijanis), and other Muslim groups. Initially, Muslims were collectively labeled as "Tartars (Tatars)," and at times, reference was made to the "Turkish-Tartar" population. However, as the Russo-Turkish and Russo-Persian wars led to an increased Muslim population within the Russian Empire, a more nuanced distinction emerged. The term "Tartar" persisted in reference to Azerbaijanis. For instance, the well-known Russian poet Alexander Pushkin noted that the owner of Tbilisi's famous Persian bathhouse was Persian, while the bathhouse attendant was Tartar.

== Demographics ==
The Muslims constitute from 9.9% (463,062) to 11% of Georgia's population.

There are two major Muslim groups in Georgia. The ethnic Georgian Muslims are Sunni Hanafi and are concentrated in the Autonomous Republic of Adjara of Georgia bordering Turkey. The ethnic Azerbaijani Muslims are predominantly Shia Ithna Ashariyah and are concentrated along the border with Azerbaijan and Armenia. The Chechens of Georgia living in Pankisi Gorge are also Sunni, but are largely Sufis of the Naqshbandi order.

The Meskhetian Turks, also a Sunni Hanafi group, are the former inhabitants of the Meskheti region of Georgia, along the border with Turkey. They were deported to Central Asia during November 15–25, 1944 by Joseph Stalin and settled within Kazakhstan, Kyrgyzstan, and Uzbekistan. Of the 120,000 forcibly deported in cattle-trucks a total of 10,000 perished. Today they are dispersed over a number of other countries of the former Soviet Union. There are 500,000 to 700,000 Meskhetian Turks in exile in Azerbaijan and Central Asia.

There are also smaller numbers of Muslims in Georgia belonging to other ethnic groups of the South Caucasus, such as Ossetians, Armenians, and Pontic Greeks (divided between Caucasus Greeks and Turkish speaking Urums). These are mainly descended from Ottoman-era Christian Orthodox converts to Islam. Many of Georgia's Muslims defined as 'Ottoman' following Lala Mustafa Pasha's Caucasian campaign that led to the Ottoman conquest of Georgia in the 1570s were actually of Armenian or Pontic Greek origin whose ancestors in Eastern Anatolia had adopted Islam. One prominent example of an Ottoman Muslim from Georgia of Caucasus Greek origin was Resid Mehmed Pasha, who played an important role in suppressing the 1822-33 Greek War of Independence (see also Greek Muslims and Armenian Muslims).

=== Geographical distribution ===
According to the 2014 Georgian Census, there were 398,677 Muslims in Georgia, down from 433,784 Muslims according to the 2004 Georgian Census. However, the share of Muslims clearly increased from 9.9 percent in 2004 to 10.7 percent in 2014. The Muslim population lives mainly in rural areas (298,668 people, or about 75% of the total population).

Regions/Municipalities	Population (2014)	Number of Muslims	%
Kvemo Kartli	423,986	182,216	43.0%
Marneuli	104,300	86,777	83.2%
Adjara	333,953	132,852	39.8%
Batumi	152,839	38,762	25.4%
Kakheti	318,583	38,683	12.1%
Gardabani	81,876	35,145	42.9%
Bolnisi	53,590	33,716	62.9%
Khelvachauri	51,189	28,841	56.3%
Khulo	23,327	22,072	94.6%
Kobuleti	74,794	21,573	28.8%
Tbilisi	1,108,717	16,268	1.5%
Sagarejo	51,761	15,804	30.5%
Guria	113,350	12,951	11.4%
Dmanisi	19,141	12,340	64.5%
Shuakhevi	15,044	11,193	74.4%
Keda	16,760	10,411	62.1%
Lagodekhi	41,678	9,662	23.2%
Ozurgeti	48,078	7,649	15.9%
Tsalka	18,849	7,375	39.2%
Samtskhe–Javakheti	160,504	6,060	3.8%
Akhmeta	31,461	5,950	18.9%
Shida Kartli	263,382	5,650	2.1%
Telavi	38,721	4,893	12.6%
Rustavi	125,103	4,566	3.6%
Kaspi	43,771	3,787	8.7%
Adigeni	16,462	3,302	20.1%
Lanchkhuti	31,486	2,790	8.9%
Chokhatauri	19,001	2,435	12.8%
Tetritsqaro	21,127	2,297	10.9%
Mtskheta-Mtianeti	94,573	2,296	2.4%
Mtskheta	47,711	2,287	4.8%
Kareli	41,316	1,264	3.1%
Aspindza	10,372	1,207	11.6%
Kvareli	29,827	1,041	3.5%
Imereti	533,906	931	0.2%
Akhalkalaki	45,070	847	1.9%
Dedoplistsqaro	21,221	770	3.6%
Samegrelo-Zemo Svaneti	330,761	766	0.2%
Ninotsminda	24,491	540	2.4%
Khobi	30,548	535	1.8%
Gori	77,549	523	0.7%
Signagi	29,948	367	1.2%
Khoni	23,570	269	1.1%
Vani	24,512	211	0.9%
Samtredia	48,562	203	0.4%
Telavi	19,629	149	0.8%
Akhaltsikhe	17,903	140	0.8%
Kutaisi	147,635	104	0.1%
Poti	41,465	79	0.2%
Ozurgeti	14,247	77	0.5%
Tsqaltubo	56,883	71	0.1%
Gori	48,143	69	0.1%
Chkhorotsqu	22,309	47	0.2%
Gurjaani	54,337	47	0.1%
Abasha	22,341	45	0.2%
Terjola	35,563	43	0.1%
Zugdidi	62,511	34	0.1%
Akhaltsikhe	20,992	13	0.1%
Baghdati	21,582	11	0.1%
Borjomi	25,214	11	0.0%
Khashuri	52,603	7	0.0%
Racha-Lechkhumi and Kvemo Svaneti	32,089	4	0.0%
Georgia	3,713,804	398,677	10.7%

== Freedom of religion ==
Ethnic Azeris, most of whom are Muslim, form the majority of the population in the southeastern Georgian region of Kvemo Kartli. Other Muslim groups include ethnic Georgians in Adjara (an autonomous region in the southwestern part of the country) and Chechens in the northeast.

In November 2012, Muslims in a western Georgian community were prevented from gathering for prayer by Orthodox priests and townspeople; the local priest said that the local residents "would not allow any minarets and mass prayers in this village", and the police did not intervene. In July 2013, Muslims in an eastern Georgian village had their services disrupted in spite of efforts at conciliation by government officials and a personal plea for tolerance by Patriarch Ilia II, head of the GOC, who denounced oppression of Muslims and said he himself had grown up in a household that included observant Muslims.

In August 2013, government authorities disassembled and removed a 24-metre (79-foot) minaret from a mosque in Chela (a village in southwestern Georgia) after objections were raised by members of the surrounding community. The minaret's confiscation was reportedly prompted by claims that the metal from which it was formed may not have been properly declared for customs purposes when it was imported from Turkey. Amidst protests against the action by Muslim residents of the village, police reportedly beat six residents and arrested eleven. Unlike in some other communities with a mixture of Muslim and Orthodox residents, there had not been any protests against the mosque or its minaret by residents of Chela. The minaret was eventually returned to the mosque and was reinstalled in late November 2013.

== Notable Georgian Muslims ==
- Aghsartan I of Kakheti - a king of Kakheti in eastern Georgia from 1054 until his death in 1084.
- Allahverdi Khan - Iranian Safavid general and statesman of Georgian origin who was Christian and converted to Islam.
- Rostom of Kartli - an Iranian Safavid appointed king of Kartli
- Bagrat VII - an Iranian Safavid appointed king of Kartli
- Constantine I of Kakheti - King of Kakheti
- Constantine II of Kakheti - King of Kakheti
- Memed Abashidze
- David XI - a Safavid appointed king of Kartli
- Koca Yusuf Pasha - Grand Vizier of the Ottoman Empire who also served as the governor of Peloponnese.
- Simon II of Kartli - an Iranian Safavid appointed king of Kartli
- Yirmisekiz Mehmed Çelebi - Georgian Ottoman statesman
- Mihrişah Sultan - consort of Ottoman sultan Mustafa III, also the mother of Selim III

== See also ==
- Chveneburi
- Iranian Georgians
- Batumi Mosque
