= Mikheil Saakashvili =

President of Georgia (2004–2007; 2008–2013)

- მიხეილ სააკაშვილი; Міхеіл Саакашвілі
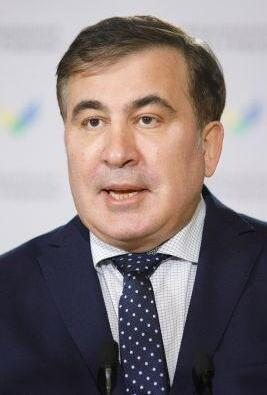
- Saakashvili in 2021

President of Georgia
- In office 20 January 2008 – 17 November 2013
- Prime Minister: Lado Gurgenidze; Grigol Mgaloblishvili; Nika Gilauri; Vano Merabishvili; Bidzina Ivanishvili
- Preceded by: Nino Burjanadze (acting)
- Succeeded by: Giorgi Margvelashvili
- In office 25 January 2004 – 25 November 2007
- Prime Minister: Zurab Zhvania; Himself (acting); Zurab Nogaideli; Giorgi Baramidze (acting); Lado Gurgenidze
- Preceded by: Nino Burjanadze (acting)
- Succeeded by: Nino Burjanadze (acting)

Governor of Odesa Oblast
- In office 30 May 2015 – 9 November 2016
- President: Petro Poroshenko
- Prime Minister: Arseniy Yatsenyuk; Volodymyr Groysman
- Preceded by: Ihor Palytsia
- Succeeded by: Solomiia Bobrovska (acting)

Chairman of the Executive Committee of the National Reform Council
- In office 7 May 2020 – 27 September 2021
- President: Volodymyr Zelenskyy
- Prime Minister: Denys Shmyhal
- Preceded by: Position established
- Succeeded by: Position abolished

Minister of Justice of Georgia
- In office 12 October 2000 – 19 September 2001
- President: Eduard Shevardnadze
- Prime Minister: Giorgi Arsenishvili
- Preceded by: John Khetsuriani
- Succeeded by: Roland Giligashvili

Prime Minister of Georgia
- Acting
- In office 3 February 2005 – 17 February 2005
- President: Himself
- Preceded by: Zurab Zhvania
- Succeeded by: Zurab Noghaideli

Member of the Parliament of Georgia
- In office 6 November 2001 – 22 November 2002
- In office 25 November 1995 – 2 March 2001

Chairman of the Tbilisi City Assembly
- In office 4 November 2001 – 2003

Chair of Union of Citizens Faction in the Parliament of Georgia
- In office 27 November 1999 – 10 October 2000
- In office 15 September 1998 – 20 November 1999

Chair of Legal Issues Committee in the Parliament of Georgia
- In office 27 November 1995 – 15 September 1998

Chairman of the United National Movement
- In office 2001 – 24 March 2019
- Preceded by: Position established
- Succeeded by: Grigol Vashadze

Chairman of the Movement of New Forces
- Incumbent
- Assumed office 23 February 2017
- Preceded by: Position established

Honorary Chairman of the United National Movement
- Incumbent
- Assumed office 24 March 2019
- Preceded by: Position established

Personal details
- Born: 21 December 1967 (age 58) Tbilisi, Georgian SSR, Soviet Union
- Citizenship: Soviet (1967–1991); Georgian (1991–2015); Ukrainian (2015–2017; 2019–present); Stateless (2017–2019)
- Party: Movement of New Forces (2017–present); United National Movement (2001–present); Union of Citizens of Georgia (1995–2001)
- Spouse: Sandra Roelofs (m. 1994)
- Children: 4
- Education: National University of Kyiv; Columbia University; George Washington University; International Institute of Human Rights
- Occupation: Jurist, politician
- Website: saakashvilimikheil.com
- Nickname: Misha

Mikheil Saakashvili (Note: /ˌsɑːkəʃˈviːli/ SAH-kəsh-VEE-lee; Georgian: მიხეილ "მიშა" სააკაშვილი [miχeˈil saakʼaˈʃʷili]; Ukrainian: Міхеі́л Ніколо́зович Саакашві́лі, romanized: Mikheil Nikolozovych Saakashvili [mixeˈil sɐɐkɐʃˈwil⁽ʲ⁾i].) (born 21 December 1967) is a Georgian-Ukrainian politician. He was the third president of Georgia for two consecutive terms from January 2004 to November 2013, with a break from November 2007 to January 2008 after he stepped down following anti-government demonstrations and ahead of an early presidential election. He is the founder and former chairman of Georgia's United National Movement party. From May 2015 until November 2016, Saakashvili was the governor of Ukraine's Odesa Oblast.

A jurist by occupation, Saakashvili entered Georgian politics in 1995 as a member of Parliament and the Minister of Justice under President Eduard Shevardnadze. He then founded the opposition United National Movement party. In 2003, as a leading opposition figure, he accused the government of rigging the 2003 Georgian parliamentary election, which triggered mass street protests and President Shevardnadze's ouster in the bloodless Rose Revolution. Saakashvili's key role in the protests led to his election as president in 2004.

As president, Saakashvili oversaw far-reaching reforms. His government dismissed and replaced the entire police force, hoping to root out corruption, and pursued a zero-tolerance policy towards crime. Its neoliberal economic policy abolished various taxes, lowered corporate income tax from 20% to 15% and dividend tax from 10% to 5%. Several ministries were abolished and 60,000 civil servants dismissed, slashing government spending, although the military budget rose to 9.2% of GDP by 2007. In 2009, Forbes ranked Georgia's tax burden as the fourth lowest in the world. GDP grew between 2003 and 2013. Per-capita income roughly tripled, but by 2013 about a quarter of the population was still below the poverty line, even as international perceptions emphasised business-friendliness and reduced corruption. Saakashvili was embroiled in scandals and accused of being behind police brutality, such as the beating of opposition politician Valery Gelashvili, the murder of Sandro Girgvliani, and systemic torture and rape in the Georgian prison system.

Saakashvili was reelected in 2008, but his party lost the 2012 Georgian parliamentary election. Term limits meant he could not stand again, and an opposition candidate, nominated by Bidzina Ivanishvili and the Georgian Dream coalition, Giorgi Margvelashvili, won the 2013 presidential election. In late 2013, ex-President Saakashvili left Georgia. In 2014, the Prosecutor's Office of Georgia filed criminal charges against him. In May 2015, Saakashvili became the governor of Ukraine's Odesa Oblast in a tenure that lasted 18 months. In 2018, the Tbilisi City Court sentenced him in absentia to six years in prison for, among other things, ordering Valery Gelashvili's beating. Saakashvili continued to manage his party from abroad. In July 2017, Saakashvili was stripped of his Ukrainian citizenship by President Poroshenko, and became stateless until 2019. He reentered Ukraine, but was arrested in February 2018 and deported. He was granted permanent residency in the Netherlands, his wife's country. In May 2019, he returned to Ukraine after newly elected President Volodymyr Zelenskyy restored his citizenship. Zelenskyy appointed Saakashvili to lead Ukraine's National Reform Council in May 2020.

In October 2021, Saakashvili announced his return to Georgia after an eight-year absence. Later the same day Georgian Prime Minister Irakli Garibashvili announced that he had been arrested in Tbilisi. In 2021, he began serving the six-year in absentia prison sentence imposed in 2018. Since May 2022, he has been treated in a civilian clinic in Tbilisi.

== Early life and education ==
Saakashvili was born in Tbilisi on 21 December 1967, capital of the then Georgian Soviet Socialist Republic in the Soviet Union. His father, Nikoloz Saakashvili, is a physician who practises medicine in Tbilisi and directs a local balneological centre. His mother, Giuli Alasania, was a historian.

During university, he served his shortened military service in 1989–1990 with the Soviet Border Troops' checkpoint unit in the Boryspil Airport in Ukraine (then as Ukrainian Soviet Socialist Republic, also a part of the Soviet Union). Saakashvili graduated from the Institute of International Relations (Department of International Law) of the Taras Shevchenko National University of Kyiv in 1992. At this university, he was friends with later President of Ukraine Petro Poroshenko. While in Ukraine, Saakashvili participated in the October 1990 student protest known as the "Revolution on Granite".

Saakashvili briefly worked as a human rights officer for the interim State Council of Georgia following the overthrow of President Zviad Gamsakhurdia before receiving a fellowship from the United States State Department (via the Edmund S. Muskie Graduate Fellowship Program). He received an LL.M. from Columbia Law School in 1994 and took classes at the School of International and Public Affairs and The George Washington University Law School the following year. In 1993, he also received a diploma from the International Institute of Human Rights in Strasbourg, France.

== Election to Georgian Parliament ==
Saakashvili interned at the United Nations. After graduation, while on internship in the New York law firm of Patterson Belknap Webb & Tyler in early 1995, he was approached by Zurab Zhvania, an old friend from Georgia who was working on behalf of President Eduard Shevardnadze to enter politics. He stood in the December 1995 elections along with Zhvania, and both men won seats in parliament, standing for the Union of Citizens of Georgia, Shevardnadze's party.

Saakashvili was chairman of the parliamentary committee which was in charge of creating a new electoral system, an independent judiciary and a non-political police force. Opinion surveys recognised him to be the second most popular person in Georgia, behind Shevardnadze. He was named "man of the year" by a panel of journalists and human rights advocates in 1997. In January 2000, Saakashvili was appointed vice-president of the Parliamentary Assembly of the Council of Europe.

On 12 October 2000, Saakashvili became Minister of Justice for the government of President Shevardnadze. He initiated major reforms in the Georgian criminal justice and prisons system. This earned praise from international observers and human rights activists. But, in mid-2001, he became involved in a major controversy with the State Security Minister Vakhtang Kutateladze and Tbilisi police chief Ioseb Alavidze, accusing them of profiting from corrupt business deals.

Saakashvili resigned on 5 September 2001, saying that "I consider it immoral for me to remain as a member of Shevardnadze's government." He declared that corruption had penetrated to the very centre of the Georgian government and that Shevardnadze lacked the will to deal with it, warning that "current developments in Georgia will turn the country into a criminal enclave in one or two years."

== In the United National Movement ==
Having resigned from the government and quit the Shevardnadze-run Union of Citizens of Georgia party, Saakashvili founded the United National Movement (UNM) in October 2001, a centre-right political party with a touch of nationalism, to provide a focus for part of the Georgian reformists leaders. In June 2002, he was elected as the Chairman of the Tbilisi Assembly ("Sakrebulo") following an agreement between the United National Movement and the Georgian Labour Party. This gave him a powerful new platform from which to criticize the government.

Georgia held parliamentary elections on 2 November 2003 which were denounced by local and international observers as being grossly rigged. Saakashvilli claimed that he had won the elections (a claim supported by independent exit polls), and urged Georgians to demonstrate against Shevardnadze's government and engage in nonviolent civil disobedience against the authorities. Saakashvili's UNM and Burdjanadze-Democrats united to demand the ouster of Shevardnadze and the rerun of the elections.

Massive political demonstrations were held in Tbilisi in November, with over 100,000 people participating and listening to speeches by Saakashvili and other opposition figures. The Kmara ("Enough!") youth organization (a Georgian counterpart of the Serbian "Otpor!") and several NGOs, like Liberty Institute, were active in all protest activities. After an increasingly tense two weeks of demonstrations, Shevardnadze resigned as president on 23 November, to be replaced on an interim basis by parliamentary speaker Nino Burjanadze. While the revolutionary leaders did their best to stay within the constitutional norms, many called the change of government a popular coup dubbed by Georgian media as the Rose Revolution.

Saakashvili's "storming of Georgia's parliament" in 2003 "put U.S. diplomats off guard... [Saakashvili] ousted a leader the U.S. had long backed, Eduard Shevardnadze." Seeking support, Saakashvili went outside the U.S. State Department. He hired Randy Scheunemann, then Sen. John McCain's top foreign-policy adviser, as a lobbyist and used Daniel Kunin of USAID and the NDI as a full-time adviser.

On 24 February 2004, the United National Movement and the United Democrats had amalgamated. The new political movement was named the National Movement - Democrats (NMD). The movement's main political priorities include raising pensions and providing social services to the poor, its main base of support; fighting corruption; and increasing state revenue.

== First presidency ==
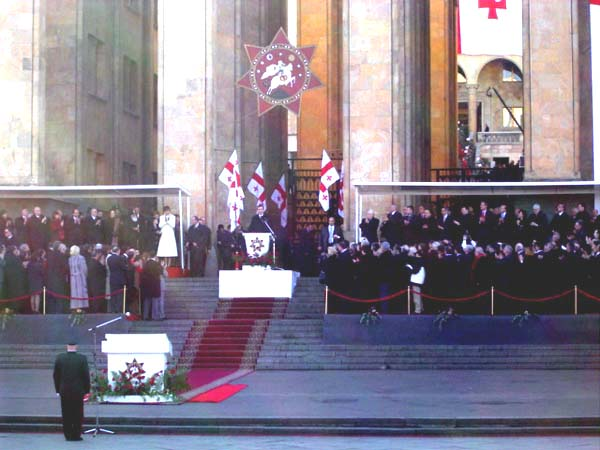
Saakashvili's inauguration as president of Georgia

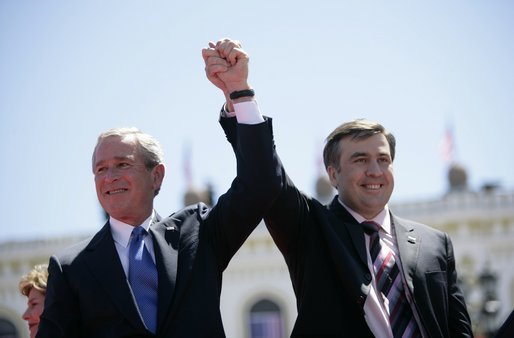
Presidents Saakashvili and George W. Bush in Tbilisi on 10 May 2005

The 2004 presidential election followed President Eduard Shevardnadze's resignation as a result of the bloodless Rose Revolution. It saw very high electoral turnout with almost all (96%) the votes cast for one candidate – Mikheil Saakashvili. 1,763,000 eligible voters took part, and less than 2% of the votes cast were for other candidates.

On 4 January 2004, aged 36, Saakashvili became the youngest national president in Europe at the time. On a platform of opposing corruption and increasing pay and pensions, he promised to improve relations with the outside world. Although strongly pro-Western and planning to seek Georgian membership of NATO and the European Union, he had also spoken of the importance of better relations with Russia. He faced major problems, however, particularly Georgia's difficult economic situation and the still unresolved question of separatism in the regions of Abkhazia and South Ossetia. Abkhazia regards itself as independent of Georgia and did not take part in the elections, while South Ossetia favours union with its northern counterpart in Russia.

Saakashvili was sworn in as president in Tbilisi on 25 January 2004. Immediately after the ceremony he signed a decree establishing a new state flag. On 26 January, in a ceremony held at the Tbilisi Kashueti Church of Saint George, he promulgated a decree granting permission for the return of the body of the first president of Georgia, Zviad Gamsakhurdia, from Grozny (Chechen Republic) to Tbilisi and renaming a major road in the capital after Gamsakhurdia. He also released 32 Gamsakhurdia supporters (political prisoners) imprisoned by the Shevardnadze government in 1993–94. As well as a new national flag, Saakashivili authorised the adoption of a new national anthem on 20 May 2004 and a new state coat of arms on 1 October 2004.

In the first months of his presidency, Saakashvili faced a major political crisis in the southwestern Autonomous Republic of Adjara run by an authoritarian regional leader, Aslan Abashidze, who largely ignored the central Georgian government and was viewed by many as pro-Russian. The crisis threatened to develop into an armed confrontation, but Saakashvili's government managed to resolve the conflict peacefully, forcing Abashidze to resign on 6 May 2004. Success in Adjara encouraged the new president to intensify his efforts towards returning the breakaway South Ossetia to Georgian jurisdiction. The separatist authorities responded with intense militarization. Armed clashes in August 2004 led to a stalemate, and a peace plan proposed by the Georgian government in 2005 did not resolve the conflict. In late July 2006, Saakashvili's government dealt successfully with another major crisis, this time in Abkhazia's Kodori Gorge where Georgia's police forces disarmed a defiant militia led by a local warlord Emzar Kvitsiani. However, on 12 August 2008 Russo–Abkhazian forces once more gained control of the Upper Kodori Valley.

In his foreign policy, Saakashvili maintained close ties with the US and other NATO countries, remaining one of the key partners of the GUAM organization. The Saakashvili-led Rose Revolution was described by the White House as one of the most powerful movements in the modern history that had inspired others to seek freedom.

=== Economic and government reforms ===
At the time Saakashvili took office, Georgia suffered from a stagnant economy, widespread corruption by police and state officials to the point where bribery was needed for any kind of commercial transaction, high crime rates, and severe infrastructure problems, including widespread power outages, and schools and medical facilities falling into disrepair. Saakashvili set out on a massive reform programme. He systematically fired politicians, public officials, and police officers suspected of corruption and significantly raised the salaries of state employees to the point where they could depend on their salaries rather than bribes for a living. Many oligarchs who had dominated the economy were arrested, with most agreeing to pay massive fines into the state budget in exchange for their freedom. Saakashvili appointed Kakha Bendukidze as the Minister of Economy to implement economic liberalization and rapidly reformed the economy by cutting red tape which had made business difficult, courting foreign investment, simplifying the tax code, launching a privatization campaign, and tackling widespread tax evasion. Due to the establishment of a functioning taxation and customs infrastructure, the state budget increased by 300% within three years. The government massively upgraded infrastructure and public services. In particular, water and power infrastructure was improved to the point where it functioned effectively, schools and hospitals were renovated, more roads were laid, and new housing developments were built.

As a result, the rate of corruption in the country was drastically reduced and the business environment was improved significantly. The economy began growing and the standard of living rose. Georgia's ranking in the Corruption Perceptions Index by Transparency International improved dramatically from rank 133 in 2004 to 67 in 2008 and further to 51 in 2012, surpassing several EU countries. The World Bank named Georgia as the leading economic reformer in the world, and the country ranked 8th in terms of ease of doing business- while most of the country's neighbours are ranked somewhere in the hundreds. The World Bank noted a significant improvement in living conditions in Georgia, reporting that "Georgia's transformation since 2003 has been remarkable. The lights are on, the streets are safe, and public services are corruption free." Doing Business report founder Simeon Dyankov has given Georgia as an example to other reformers during the annual Reformer Awards.

In 2004, the government artificially reduced the number of people living below the poverty line by changing the methodology used to measure the subsistence level.

Under Saakashvili's term, Georgia became involved in international market transactions to a small extent, and in 2007 Bank of Georgia sold bonds at premium, when $200m five-year bond was priced with a coupon of 9 per cent at par, or 100 per cent of face value, after initially being priced at 9.5 per cent and investors pushed orders up to $600m.

In 2009, he introduced The Economic Liberty Act of Georgia, which was adopted by the Parliament of Georgia in 2011. The Act restricted the state's ability to interfere in the economy, and was aimed at reducing the state expenses and debt by 30% and 60%, respectively. It also explicitly prohibited the Government from changing taxes without a popular referendum on rates and structure.

Due to his government's economic reforms, Georgia's economy grew 70% between 2003 and 2013, and per capita income roughly tripled. However, poverty only marginally declined. At the end of his second term, about a quarter of the population was still poor, and unemployment was at 15%.

=== Law and order ===
On 27 March 2006, the government announced that it had prevented a nationwide prison riot plotted by criminal kingpins. The police operation ended with the deaths of 7 inmates and at least 17 injuries. While the opposition cast doubts over the official version and demanded an independent investigation, the ruling party was able to vote down such initiatives.

Despite this, Saakashvili's government also eased the legal system in some respects. His government decriminalized libel and pushed through legislation upholding freedom of speech, although he was accused of stifling the media and using the judicial system to go after his political opponents in spite of this. In December 2006, Saakashvili signed a constitutional amendment completely abolishing the death penalty in law.

=== Military reforms ===
Saakashvili's government massively increased military spending to modernize the Georgian Armed Forces, which were small and poorly equipped and trained at the time he entered office. By 2007, the military budget had increased twenty-fold since 1999. New weapons and vehicles were purchased, military salaries were raised, new bases were built, and Georgian soldiers engaged in joint training exercises with the US military.

=== Education reform ===
When Saakashvili took office, the university entrance system was bribe-based, with a university spot costing up to $50,000 in 2003. His government introduced a common entrance exam, replacing the bribe-based system with a merit-based one. The quality of university education also improved. Despite this, Saakashvili was accused of failing to reform the quality of primary and secondary-level school education, which reportedly remained low at the end of his term in office.

=== Health reforms ===
After Georgian independence, the government found that its Soviet-style centralized healthcare system was underfunded and failing. State-run centralized medical facilities were typically inefficient and in need of renovation and technological upgrades. As a result, the government privatized almost all public hospitals and clinics, and the insurance system was deregulated, with private insurance companies able to offer coverage. Only a few specialized facilities for mental health and infectious diseases remained in government hands, and the state continued to provide health insurance for those below the poverty line, whose insurance was paid for by public funds and provided by private insurers, and some civil servants, amounting to about 40% of the population. As a result, the level of healthcare greatly improved, with new hospitals and clinics beginning to replace older facilities. However, a portion of the population was left uninsured, as it could not afford private insurance and did not qualify for public insurance.

=== Foreign relations ===
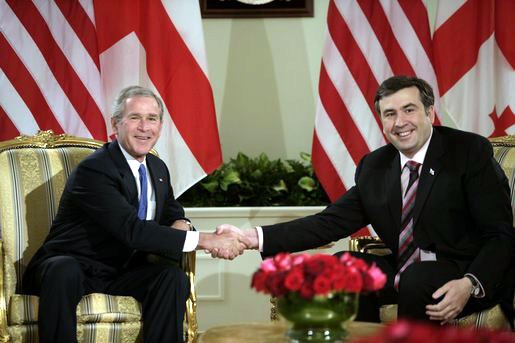
U.S. President George W. Bush and Saakashvili meet in Tbilisi on 10 May 2005.

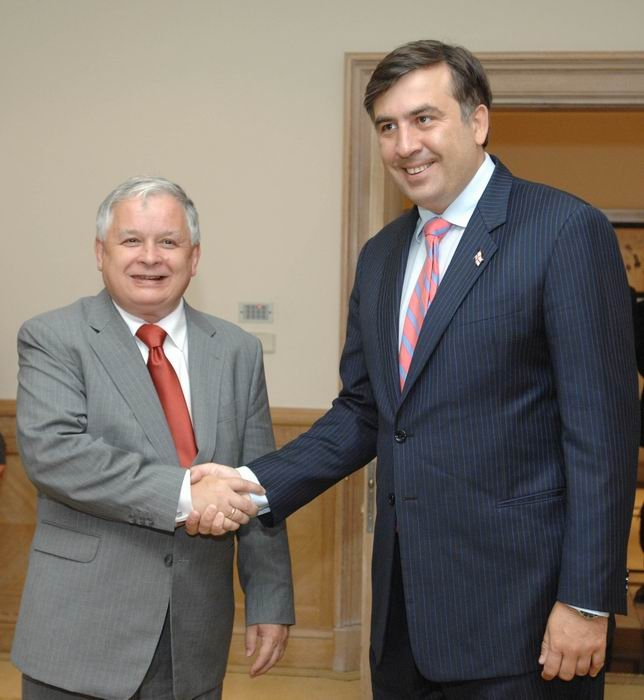
Mikheil Saakashvili with President of Poland Lech Kaczyński in 2007

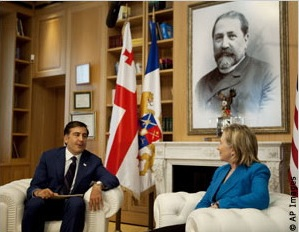
Mikheil Saakashvili with U.S. Secretary of State Hillary Clinton in 2010

Saakashvili saw NATO membership as necessary for the stability of Georgia. He offered an intensified dialogue with the de facto Abkhaz and Ossetian authorities. Until the 2008 South Ossetia war, a diplomatic solution was thought possible. Saakashvili's administration doubled the number of its troops in Iraq, making Georgia one of the biggest supporters of Coalition Forces, and keeping its troops in Kosovo and Afghanistan to "contribute to what it describe[d] as global security".

Saakashvili's government maintained diplomatic relations with other Caucasian states and western-oriented nearby countries such as Armenia, Azerbaijan, Estonia, Latvia, Lithuania, Poland, Romania, Turkey and Ukraine. In 2004, Saakashvili visited Israel to attend the official opening of the Modern Energy Problems Research Center, and Dr. Brenda Schaffer, the director of the centre, described Saakashvili as the Nelson Mandela of the 21st century. That August, Saakashvili, who holds an honorary doctorate from the University of Haifa, travelled to Israel again to attend the opening of the official Week of Georgian-Jewish Friendship, held under the auspices of the Georgian president, for which the Jewish leaders were invited as honoured guests.

Relations with the United States were good, but were complicated by Saakashvili's "volatile" behaviour. Former and current US officials characterized the Georgian president as "difficult to manage". They criticized his "risky moves", that had often "caught the U.S. unprepared" while leaving it "exposed diplomatically".

Saakashvili's ties with the US go back to 1991 (see Early life and career). Biographies of Thomas Jefferson and John F. Kennedy could be found in his office, next to biographies of Joseph Stalin and Mustafa Kemal Atatürk and books on war. Seeking US support, Saakashvili went outside the United States Department of State and established contacts with Sen. John McCain and forces seeking NATO expansion.

Saakashvili believed that the long-term priority for the country was to advance its membership in the European Community. During a meeting with Javier Solana, he said that, in contrast with new and old European states, Georgia is an Ancient European state.

=== Assassination attempt ===
On 10 May 2005, while U.S. President George W. Bush was giving a speech in Tbilisi's Freedom Square, Vladimir Arutyunian threw a live hand grenade at where Saakashvili and Bush were sitting. It landed in the crowd about 20 metres (65 ft) from the podium after hitting a girl and did not detonate. Arutyunian was arrested in July of that year, but before his capture, he managed to kill one law enforcement agent. He was convicted of the attempted assassinations of Saakashvili and Bush and the murder of the agent, and given a life sentence.

=== 2007 crisis ===
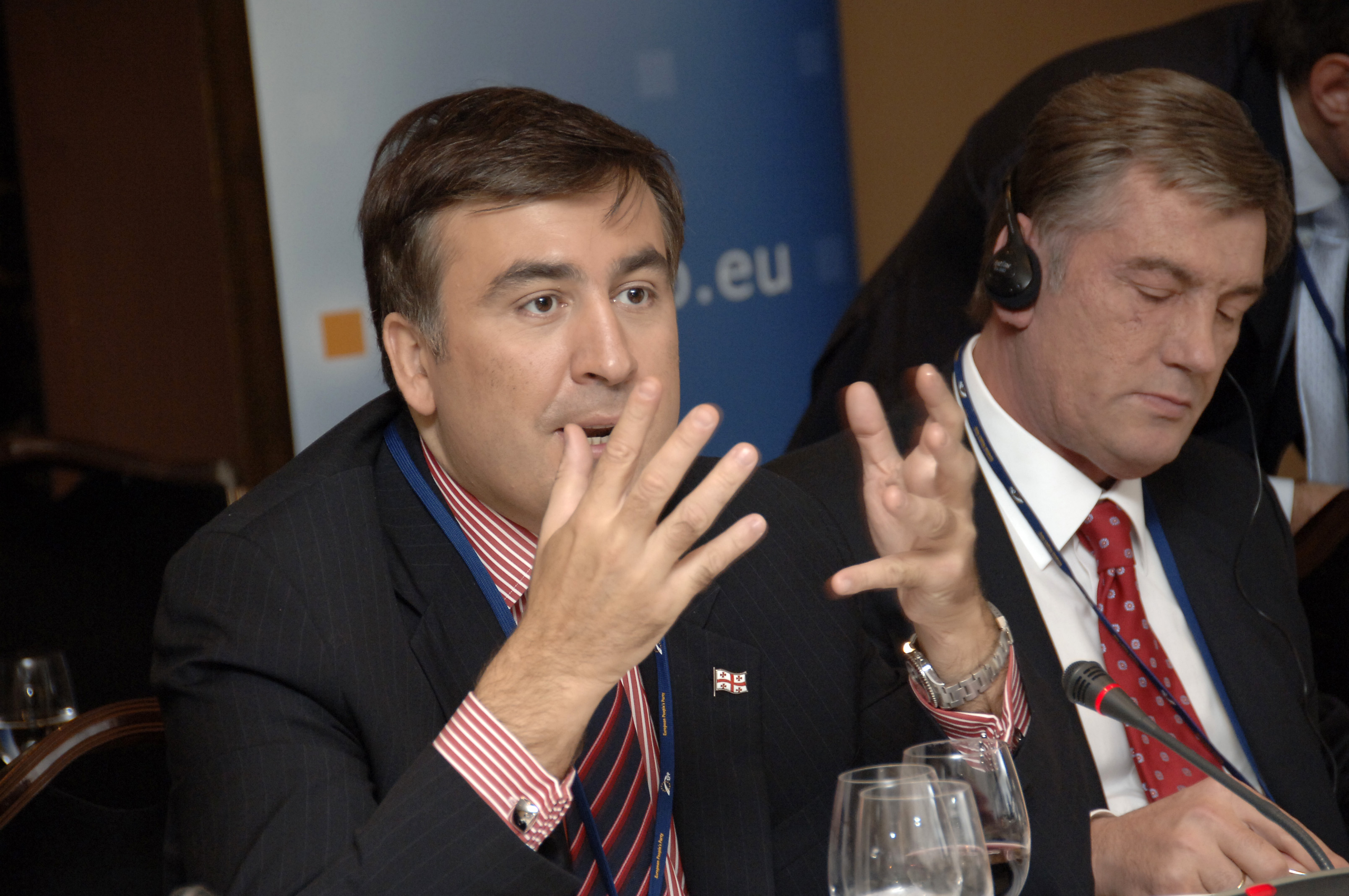
Saakashvili at the 2007 European People's Party Summit in Lisbon.

The late Georgian businessman Badri Patarkatsishvili claimed that pressure had been exerted on his financial interests after Imedi Television broadcast several accusations against officials. On 25 September 2007, former defence minister Irakli Okruashvili accused the president of planning Patarkatsishvili's murder. Okruashvili was detained two days later on charges of extortion, money laundering, and abuse of office. However, on 8 October 2007 the General Prosecutor's Office released a videotaped confession, in which Okruashvili pleaded guilty to large-scale bribery through extortion and negligence while serving as minister. He also retracted his accusations against the president and said that he made them to gain political benefit at the request of Badri Patarkatsishvili. Okruashvili's lawyer and other opposition leaders said this retraction had been made under duress.

Georgia faced the worst crisis since the Rose Revolution. Okruashvili's accusations against the president and his allies sparked a series of anti-government demonstrations in October, climaxing early in November. They involved several opposition groups and the influential media tycoon Badri Patarkatsishvili. Although the demonstrations rapidly faded, the government's decision to use police force against the remaining protesters evolved into clashes in the streets of Tbilisi on 7 November. The President's declaration of a state of emergency (7–16 November) and the restrictions imposed on some mass media sources led to harsh criticism of the Saakashvili government both in Georgia and abroad. Human Rights Watch criticized the Georgian government for using "excessive" force against protesters in November and International Crisis Group warned of growing authoritarianism.

Patarkatsishvili's opposition television station, Imedi, was shut down in November 2007, after the authorities accused it of complicity with the plot to overthrow the elected government. It resumed broadcasts a few weeks after the incident, but did not broadcast news or talk shows until after the election. The station was later sold to supporters of the Saakashvili government and some Georgian journalists have called for it to be handed back.

On 8 November 2007, President Saakashvili announced a compromise solution to hold early presidential elections on 5 January 2008. He also proposed to hold a simultaneous plebiscite about when to hold parliamentary polls – in spring as pushed for by the opposition parties, or in late 2008. Several concessions in the election code were also made to the opposition.

On 23 November 2007, the ruling United National Movement party officially nominated Saakashvili as its candidate for the upcoming elections. Pursuant to the Constitution of Georgia, Saakashvili resigned on 25 November to launch his pre-election campaign for early presidential polls.

== Second presidency ==
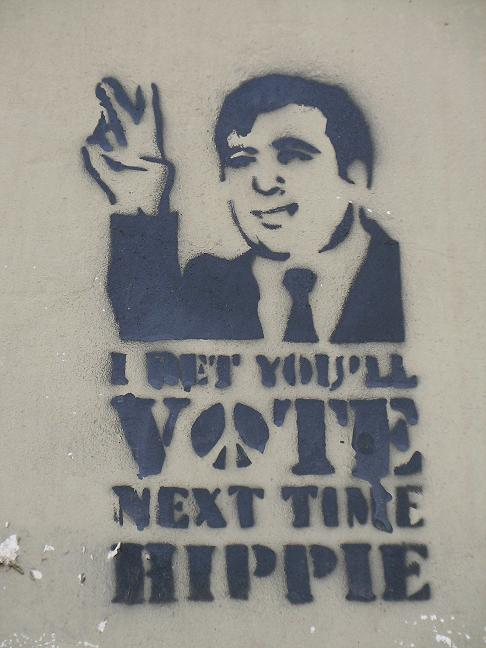
Graffiti in Tbilisi

=== 2008 presidential election ===
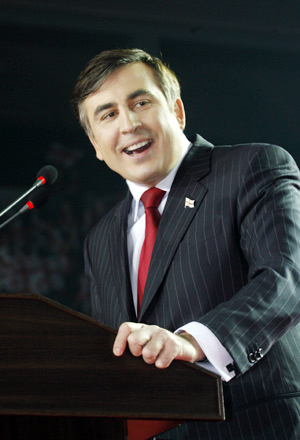
Saakashvili in 2008

On 5 January 2008, an early presidential election was held nationwide, with the exception of the highland village of Shatili, where the polling station was not opened due to high levels of snowfall. In a televised address, President Saakashvili had proposed to hold the election earlier than called for by the Georgian constitution in order to resolve the political tension surrounding opposition-led demonstrations, their suppression by the government on 7 November 2007, and the closure of the most popular opposition television network, Imedi. Saakashvili said in his presidential address that "these elections will be held according to our timing, and not that of our ill-wishers."

=== Changes in the Cabinet ===
Saakashvili publicly announced his plans of modernising the Cabinet of Georgia well before Georgian presidential elections. Shortly after being re-elected, the president formally re-appointed the Prime Minister of Georgia Lado Gurgenidze and asked him to present a renewed cabinet to the Parliament of Georgia for final approval.

Gurgenidze changed most ministers, leaving Ivane Merabishvili, controversial Minister for Home Affairs, Defence Minister Davit Kezerashvili and Minister of Finance Nika Gilauri on their former positions. Gia Nodia was appointed as the Minister of Education and Science. Zaza Gamcemlidze, former director of Tbilisi Botanic Garden, took over the position of the Minister of Natural Resources and Nature Protection. Famous archaeologist, and already the eldest minister in the cabinet, Iulon Gagoshidze was appointed on a newly designated position of the Minister of State for Diasporas.

Parliamentary elections held during Saakashvili's second term were condemned by the Organization for Security and Co-operation in Europe election monitoring mission for being marred by ballot stuffing, violence against opposition campaigners, uncritical coverage of the president and his party from the state-controlled media, and public officials openly campaigning for the president's party.

On 28 October 2008, Saakashvili proposed Grigol Mgaloblishvili, Georgian ambassador to Turkey for the premiership. According to the president, Gurgenidze had initially agreed to serve only for a year and that Georgia was facing new challenges which needed new approach. The Parliament of Georgia approved Mgaloblishvili as the premier on 1 November 2008.

Demonstrations against Saakashvili spread across Georgia in 2009, 2011 and 2012.

=== Russo-Georgian War ===
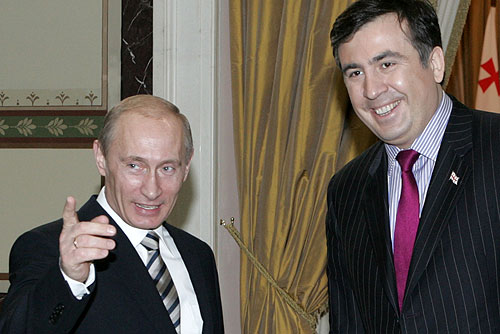
Meeting with Russian President Vladimir Putin, 22 February 2008

On 22 February 2008, Saakashvili held an official meeting with the President of Russia Vladimir Putin, in his residence in Novo-Ogaryovo. The presidents discussed the issues of aviation regulations between the two countries. This was Putin's last meeting in his second term as the president of Russia, being succeeded by Dimitry Medvedev shortly thereafter.

However, after a series of clashes between Georgians and South Ossetians, Russian military forces intervened on the side of the South Ossetian separatists in response to the Georgian attack on Tskhinvali and invaded Gori in Shida Kartli. The two counterparts were led to a ceasefire agreement and a six-point peace plan, due to the French President's mediation. On 26 August 2008, the Russian president, Dmitry Medvedev, signed a decree recognizing Abkhazia and South Ossetia as independent states. Also on 26 August, in response to Russia's recognition of Abkhazia and South Ossetia, Deputy Foreign Minister Grigol Vashadze announced that Georgia had broken diplomatic relations with Russia.

Medvedev held Saakashvili responsible for the Russo-Georgian War, and states that Saakashvili is responsible for the collapse of the Georgian state.

The Georgian military's capabilities were severely damaged by the war, and Saakashvili's government moved to rebuild them, massively increasing military spending. By late 2010, the Georgian military reached a strength greater than that of pre-war levels, after which military spending declined again. Although the Georgian government bought large amounts of arms and military equipment from abroad, it also began to seriously invest in an indigenous military industry. Starting in 2010, Georgia began to manufacture its own line of armoured vehicles, artillery systems, small arms, and unmanned aerial vehicles.

=== 2009 opposition demonstrations and armed mutiny ===
The pressure against Saakashvili intensified in 2009, when the opposition launched mass demonstrations against Saakashvili's rule. On 5 May 2009, Georgian police said large-scale disorders were planned in Georgia of which the failed army mutiny was part. According to the police, Saakashvili's assassination had also been plotted. Opposition figures dispute the claim of an attempted mutiny and instead say that troops refused an illegal order to use force against opposition demonstrators.

=== End of presidency ===
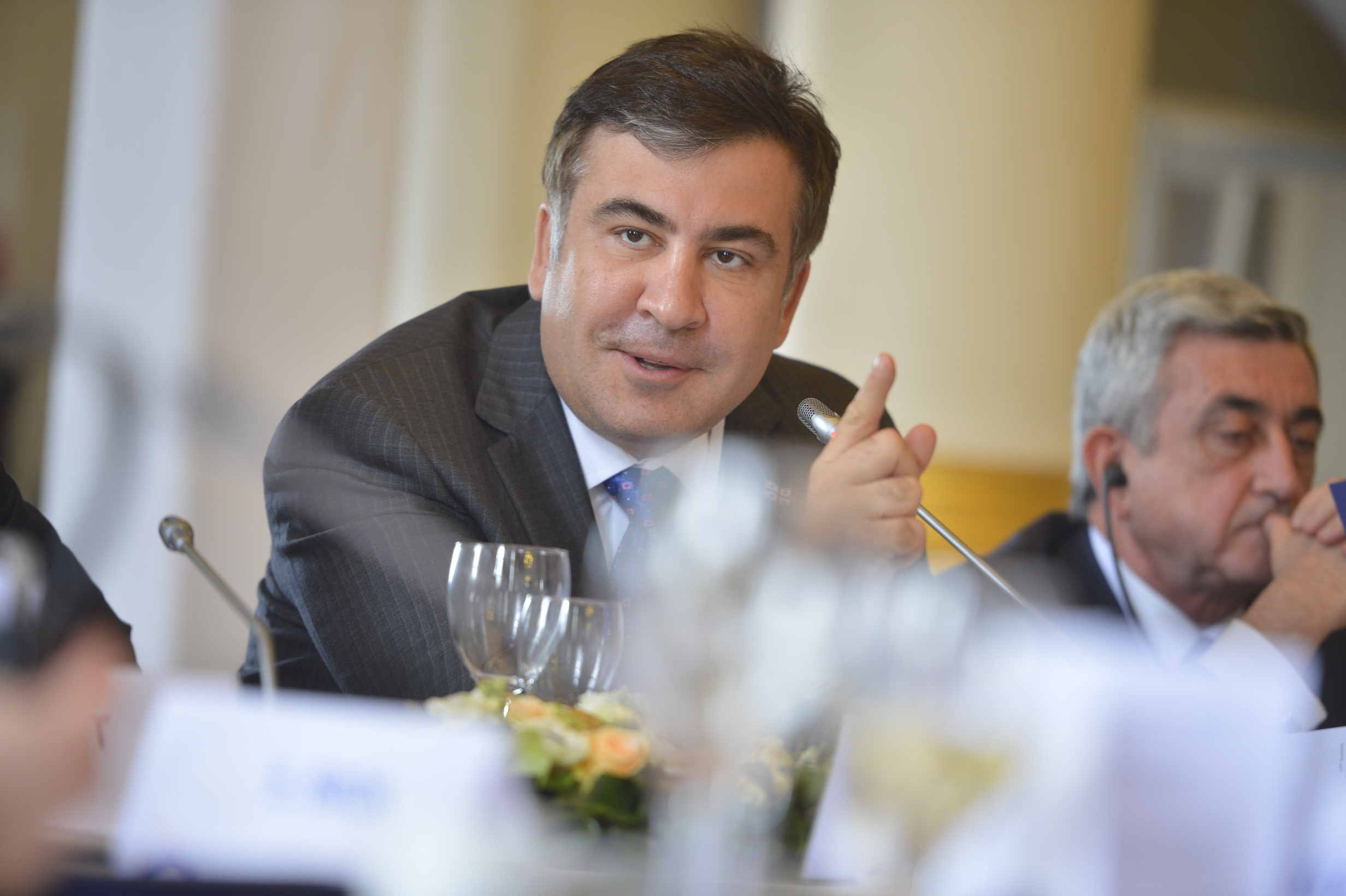
Mikheil Saakashvili (2013)

On 2 October 2012, Saakashvili admitted defeat in Georgia's parliamentary election against Bidzina Ivanishvili in the election the day before. He was barred from seeking a third term in the 2013 presidential election. Saakashvili left Georgia shortly after the election.

In December 2013, Saakashvili accepted the position of lecturer and senior statesman at Tufts University in the United States.

=== Prosecution in Georgia after presidency ===
On 23 March 2014, when Saakashvili was summoned to give testimony to the main prosecutor's office of Georgia, the office planned to interrogate him about the pardoning in 2008 of four high-ranking officials of the Department of Constitutional Security of the Georgian Ministry of Internal Affairs – Gia Alania, Avtandil Aptsiauri, Alexander Gachava and Mikhail Bibiluridze, who were convicted for causing the death of bank employee Sandro Girgvliani on 28 January 2006, as well as for unlawful actions against his friend Levan Bukhaidze. He was also to be questioned as a witness for nine criminal cases, including the death of the Prime Minister of Georgia Zurab Zhvania in 2005.

On 28 July 2014, criminal charges were filed by the Georgian prosecutor's office against Saakashvili over allegedly "exceeding official powers" during the 2007 Georgian demonstrations, as well as a police raid on and "seizure" of Imedi TV and other assets owned by the late tycoon Badri Patarkatsishvili. Saakashvili, then in Hungary, responded by accusing the Georgian authorities of political score-settling and attempts at appeasing Russia. The United States expressed concerns over the case and warned that "the legal system should not be used as a tool of political retribution". The European Union stated that it took "note with concern" and it will "closely monitor these and other legal proceedings against members of the former government and current opposition in Georgia".

On 2 August 2014, Tbilisi City Court ordered pre-trial detention in absentia for Saakashvili and the co-accused Zurab Adeishvili (chief prosecutor in 2007) and Davit Kezerashvili (defense minister in 2007), with a preliminary hearing appointed for September 2014.

On 13 August 2014, Saakashvili was charged with embezzling budget funds. On 14 August, an internal search was declared, and on 31 August, the procedure for declaring an international search was launched. On 1 August 2015, Interpol refused to declare Saakashvili on the international wanted list, as the Georgian authorities demanded. In September, the property of the Saakashvili family was seized. His personal bank accounts in Georgia were also seized.

In March 2015, Ukraine denied a Georgian request to extradite Saakashvili, as it deemed the criminal cases against him politically motivated. Saakashvili stated on 1 June 2015 that he had given up (three days before) Georgian citizenship to avoid "guaranteed imprisonment" in Georgia. The Constitution of Ukraine forbids the extradition of Ukrainians to other states.

On 8 August 2017, the Georgian General Prosecutor's Office claimed Saakashvili would face up to 11 years of imprisonment (charges included the spending of public funding on personal needs, abuse of power during the dispersal of a demonstration on 7 November 2007, the beating of former MP Valery Gelashvili and the raid of Imedi TV). On 18 August 2017, Georgia requested Ukraine to extradite Saakashvili. On 5 September, the Ukrainian authorities confirmed that they had received the request from Georgia.

On 5 January 2018, the Tbilisi City Court sentenced Saakashvili to three-year imprisonment in absentia for abusing power in pardoning the former Interior Ministry officials convicted in the 2006 Sandro Girgvliani murder case. On 28 June 2018, the Tbilisi City Court found Saakashvili guilty of abusing his authority as president by trying to cover up evidence related to the 2005 beating of opposition lawmaker Valery Gelashvili and sentenced him in absentia to six years in prison. Saakashvili and his supporters denounced the verdict as politically motivated.

After returning to Georgia in 2021, Saakashvili was additionally charged for illegal border crossing.

=== Poisoning during incarceration ===
In December 2022, a legal team led by Massimo F. D'Angelo released toxicology findings that allegedly showed elevated levels of heavy metals, including arsenic and mercury, in his body. An American toxicologist argued that the results were consistent with poisoning during his 2021 imprisonment and warned that his health posed an imminent risk without treatment abroad. Saakashvili also experienced significant weight loss and neurological symptoms, which drew concern from international observers and prompted calls for his transfer to a foreign hospital. Ukrainian president Volodymyr Zelenskyy described his treatment as "a de facto public execution."

== Ukraine ==
Saakashvili energetically supported Ukraine's Euromaidan movement and its Revolution of Dignity. On 7 March 2014, Saakashvili authored an op-ed piece entitled "When Putin invaded my country", in the context of the turmoil in Ukraine after the ouster on 22 February of President Viktor Yanukovych and before the 16 March referendum in the annexation of Crimea by the Russian Federation.

In November 2013, Saakashvili moved to Williamsburg, Brooklyn, New York.

=== Governor of Odesa ===
On 13 February 2015, Saakashvili was appointed by the president of Ukraine, Petro Poroshenko, as head of the International Advisory Council on Reforms—an advisory body whose main task is working out proposals and recommendations for implementation and introduction of reforms in Ukraine based on best international practices. On 30 May 2015, Poroshenko appointed Saakashvili Governor of Odesa Oblast (region). On the previous day, 29 May 2015, he was granted Ukrainian citizenship. A month before this appointment, Saakashvili had stated that he had turned down the post of First Vice Prime Minister of Ukraine because in order to fulfill that post, he would have had to become a Ukrainian citizen and renounce his Georgian citizenship. Saakashvili stated on 1 June 2015 that he had now changed his mind to avoid "guaranteed imprisonment" in Georgia and to defend Georgian interest through his governorship in Odesa. Also on 1 June, the Ministry of Foreign Affairs of Georgia stated that the appointment of Saakashvili would not have a negative impact on the relations between Georgia and Ukraine. But in reality, after this appointment, relations between the two countries soured. On 4 December 2015, Saakashvili was stripped of his Georgian citizenship due to restrictions on dual nationality under Georgian law. Saakashvili claimed that this was done to prevent him from leading the United National Movement in the 2016 Georgian parliamentary election.

A poll by Sociological group "RATING" showed that in October 2015, Saakashvili was the most popular politician in Ukraine (43% viewed him positively).

In December 2015, Saakashvili started an anti-corruption NGO Movement for Purification. Among rumours that this NGO would be transformed into a political force, Saakashvili stated he did not have the intention to create a new political party. In the autumn of 2015, informal attempts and negotiations were launched to form a political party around Saakashvili with members of the parliamentary group Interfactional Union "Eurooptimists", Democratic Alliance and possibly Self Reliance, but this project collapsed in June 2016.

Saakashvili submitted his resignation as governor on 7 November 2016 citing corruption in Ukraine as a main reason. In a press conference this same day, he claimed that President Poroshenko personally supported "corruption clans in the Odesa region" and that the "Odesa region is being handed over not only to corrupt people, but also to enemies of Ukraine." (Note: During the same press conference Saakashvili vowed "to start a new stage of the struggle" with "young people, unstained forces." According to Saakashvili: "We will definitely unite and we will fight for the victory of a new Ukraine for the people of Odesa, for all other residents of Ukraine. The fight continues, and we will definitely win this fight.") On 9 November 2016, President Poroshenko accepted Saakashvili's resignation (as governor) and dismissed him as his freelance adviser.

=== Movement of New Forces ===
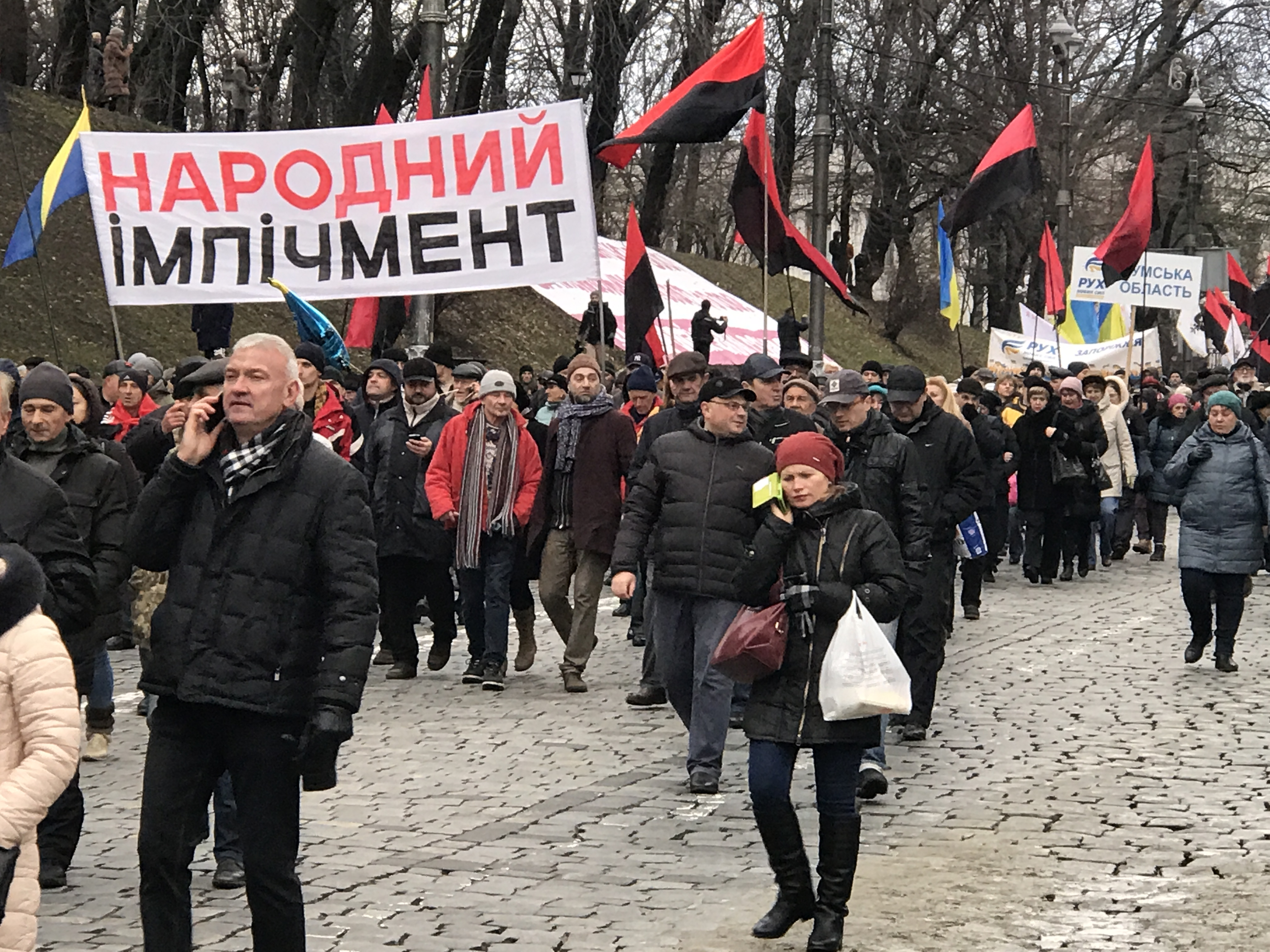
Saakashvili-led protesters demand Petro Poroshenko's impeachment, Kyiv, 3 December 2017

On 11 November 2016, Saakashvili announced his goal to create a new political party called "Movement of New Forces" and that "our goal is early parliamentary elections to be carried out as quickly as possible in the shortest possible time." In late February 2017, the Ministry of Justice of Ukraine registered Movement of New Forces officially as a political party.

According to a poll by Sociological group "RATING", 18% viewed Saakashvili positively in April 2017.

In Ukraine, only Ukrainian citizens can lead political parties or be elected to its parliament.

=== Stripping of Ukrainian citizenship ===
On 26 July 2017, President Poroshenko issued a decree (Note: The decree was not made publicly available "in accordance with the legislation on personal data protection".) stripping Saakashvili of his Ukrainian citizenship, but without a reason for his doing so being stated. Ukraine's migration service said in a statement that "according to the Constitution of Ukraine, the president takes decisions on who is stripped of Ukrainian citizenship based on the conclusions of the citizenship commission". Saakashvili, in response to his being stripped of citizenship, replied: "I have only one citizenship, that of Ukraine, and I will not be deprived of it! Now there is an attempt under way to force me to become a refugee. This will not happen! I will fight for my legal right to return to Ukraine!" A Ukrainian legislator from the Petro Poroshenko Bloc faction in parliament, Serhiy Leshchenko, said that Saakashvili was (when Poroshenko issued his decree) in the United States, but that if he sought to return to Ukraine, he would face extradition to Georgia to face charges for alleged crimes that occurred during his presidency there. According to The Economist, most observers saw Poroshenko's stripping Saakashvili of his citizenship "simply as the sidelining of a political rival" (at the time political polls gave Saakashvili's political party Movement of New Forces around 2% in a hypothetical early election). On 28 July 2017, Saakashvili told Newshour he wanted to return to Ukraine to "get rid of the old corrupt elite" there.

On 4 August, Saakashvili appeared in Poland; (Note: According to Saakashvili himself, he entered Poland with his Ukrainian passport but it is unclear what passport he travelled on as his Ukraine passport was invalidated and the country he had travelled from, the United States, is not a signatory to the 1954 United Nations multilateral treaty Convention Relating to the Status of Stateless Persons granting international travel documents to stateless persons.) he left the country 4 days later travelling to Lithuania claiming "I'll be travelling across Europe." Saakashvili announced on 16 August that he will return to Ukraine on 10 September (2017) through the Krakovets checkpoint and urged people to meet him at the checkpoint.

On 10 September, the train on which Saakashvili tried to enter Ukraine was held at a railway station in Przemysl, Poland. Then, on the same day, he travelled by bus to the Medyka-Shehyni border crossing, where he was allowed to pass through a Polish checkpoint on the border with Ukraine, but then temporarily blocked from reaching the Ukrainian checkpoint by a line of border guards standing arm-in-arm. Finally, a crowd broke through from the Ukrainian side and took Saakashvili into Ukraine. On 12 September, in the Leopolis Hotel in Lviv, the State Border Guard Service of Ukraine acquainted Saakashvili with the protocol on the administrative violation of "Illegal crossing or attempted illegal crossing of the state border of Ukraine."

At a rally in the western Ukrainian city of Chernivtsi on 13 September, Saakashvili announced that he would return to Kyiv on 19 September after travelling to several other cities to rally support.

On 22 September, the Mostysky District Court of the Lviv region found Saakashvili guilty of illegally crossing the state border. Under the court's decision, he must pay a fine of 200 non-taxable minimums (3400 hryvni).

In the first half of 2017, and in December 2018 and January 2019, Saakashvili hosted political talk shows on the TV channel "Zik". Saakashvili claims his programme was axed in 2019 because his view on Yulia Tymoshenko's candidacy for the 2019 Ukrainian presidential election was distorted (he claimed to support her candidacy while his TV show suggested the exact opposite).

=== Prosecution in Ukraine ===
On 5 December 2017, Saakashvili (who was leading anti-government protests at the time) was temporarily detained by Ukraine's Security Service on the roof of his apartment building in central Kyiv and his apartment was searched. He was freed from police by a large group of protesters. Saakashvili's lawyer reported that the politician had been detained for attempting to overthrow Ukraine's constitutional system, whilst the SBU accused Saakashvili of receiving financing from a "criminal group" linked to ousted (during the Revolution of Dignity) Ukrainian President Viktor Yanukovych. On 8 December, General Prosecutor of Ukraine Yuriy Lutsenko announced that National Police officers had found the location of Saakashvili, detained him and placed him in a temporary detention centre. The following day, Saakashvili began an indefinite hunger strike, claiming to oppose any attempts at compulsory feeding. On 11 December, a Ukrainian court released him from detention.

On 12 February 2018, Saakashvili was deported to Poland. The Ukrainian border service stated "This person was on Ukrainian territory illegally and therefore, in compliance with all legal procedures, he was returned to the country from where he arrived". Saakashvili was subsequently banned from entering Ukraine until 2021 by the Ukrainian border service. Saakashvili claimed that his Georgian bodyguards and supporters had in recent months been kidnapped, tortured and deported to Georgia. On 14 February 2018, Saakashvili showed up in the Netherlands, having been granted permanent residency there on the basis of family reunification.

=== Return to Ukraine ===
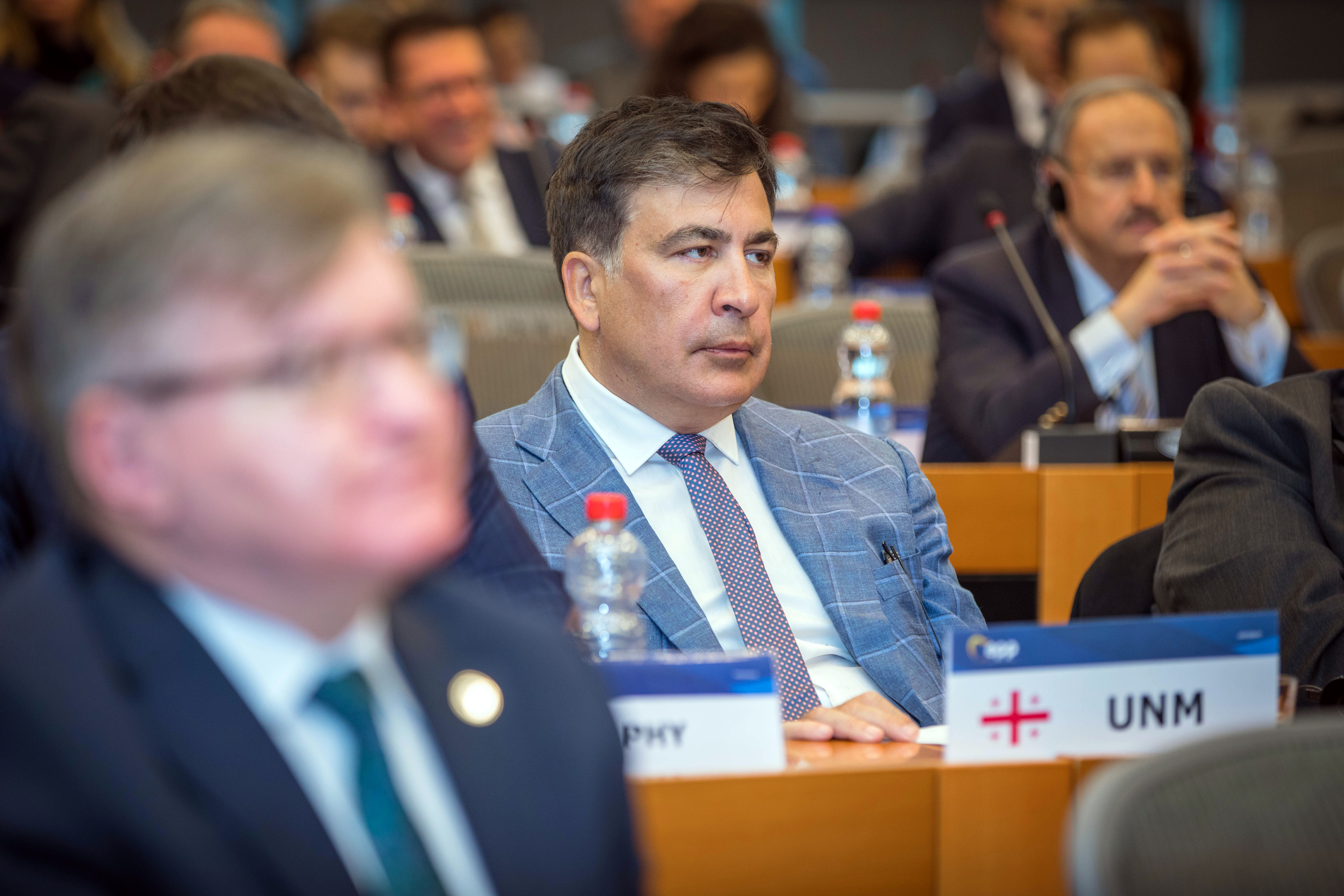
Mikheil Saakashvili (2019)

In May 2019, Ukraine's new president, Volodymyr Zelenskyy, restored Saakashvili's Ukrainian citizenship. (Note: On 21 June 2019 a Ukrainian court ruled that Saakashvili had resided in Ukraine from 23 February 2014, to 6 June 2019; even though after he was stripped of his citizenship under a decree by President Petro Poroshenko he was deported for more than a year.) On 29 May 2019, Saakashvili returned to Ukraine; but he soon stated that he had no political ambitions in Ukraine.

On 4 June, Kyiv Mayor Vitali Klitschko offered Saakashvili to join the leadership of his UDAR party and to take part in the July 2019 early parliamentary elections. Saakashvili turned down the offer. In these elections Saakashvili headed the party list of Movement of New Forces. The party received 0.46% of the total votes and no seats. Two days before the election, Saakashvili had called on his supporters to vote for the Servant of the People party at the election. (Servant of the People won the election with 43.16% of the votes.)

Saakashvili wrote on his Facebook page on 22 April 2020 that he had received a proposal from President Zelenskyy to become Vice Prime Minister of Ukraine for reforms in the Shmyhal Government. Saakashvili told the Financial Times newspaper: "The president wants me to be in charge of talks with the IMF ... I have experience." The Ukrainian parliament did not consider the issue at its meetings on 24 and 30 April 2020. (Note: In Ukraine only parliament can appoint and dismiss government ministers.) On 7 May 2020, President Zelenskyy appointed Saakashvili head of the executive committee of the National Reform Council.

== Political activity in Georgia since the end of presidency ==
After stepping down as president in 2013, Saakashvili still remained an influential figure in Georgian politics. He continued to manage the United National Movement party from abroad, while accusing the Georgian government of using the legal system as a tool of political retribution.

Ahead of the 2016 Georgian parliamentary election, Saakashvili said that he was confident that "we [the United National Movement] are winning the election" and promised to return to Georgia and take part in forming a new government. Founder of the ruling Georgian Dream party Bidzina Ivanishvili accused Saakashvili of planning to stir disorders, which Saakashvili denied and in turn accused Ivanishvili of "blaming opponents for what he himself is planning". On 26 September 2016, Saakashvili addressed his supporters at the United National Movement's campaign rally in Zugdidi via video link from Odesa, telling them that "the victory is inevitable". Saakashvili's wife Sandra Roelofs said that Saakashvili would return to Georgia to celebrate the victory. Meanwhile, members of the UNM-affiliated group, Free Zone, held press briefing in Tbilisi, accusing Saakashvili of instructing the leader of the organization Koba Khabazi to prepare for staging disorders. In response to allegations, the State Security Service of Georgia launched an investigation into charges of sabotage. Other members of the Free Zone distanced themselves from these claims and in turn accused the defecting group of being under influence of the State Security Service.

On 27 September 2016, a recording was uploaded on YouTube, purportedly of a call between Mikheil Saakashvili and other UNM leaders discussing the need to pursue a "revolutionary scenario". The State Security Service launched an investigation into charges of "conspiracy to overthrow or to seize state power". Saakashvili denied the authenticity of the conversation and accused Bidzina Ivanishvili of trying to "avoid unavoidable defeat".

On 4 October 2016, Saakashvili accused Ivanishvili of being behind the explosion of car belonging to United National Movement MP Givi Targamadze, alleging that Ivanishvili was trying to "get rid of" Targamadze because he "has been keeping active contacts with the law enforcement [officers], which scares Ivanishvili very much".

On 5 October 2016, Saakashvili addressed his supporters via video link in Tbilisi, saying that three days were left before his return to Georgia.

After elections, Saakashvili said that they were held "with gross violations", calling his supporters to protest. Saakashvili also expressed his support for boycotting the Parliament, a step which other leaders of the United National Movement described as a "suicide for the party". On 4 November, the UNM's political council rejected Saakashvili's calls to boycott. Saakashvili slammed the decision and said that he had no desire to maintain contact with "one or two whimsical persons" from UNM, accusing them of "prescribing defeat" for the party. On 1 December, the political council voted to hold a congress in January to elect a new chairman. Saakashvili lost his right to be UNM's chairman in June 2015, when he was deprived of Georgian citizenship because under Georgian legislation only Georgian citizens can chair political parties in Georgia. Since then, this position remained vacant. Some influential members of the party expressed support for further leaving the position vacant to avoid distancing the party from Mikheil Saakashvili and said that they would raise the issue on congress. Saakashvili supported the idea of holding congress, while some members of the party, under the leadership of Giga Bokeria and Davit Bakradze, accused Saakashvili of "hijacking" the congress organization in circumvention of the political council.

On 12 January 2017, one week before the congress, the United National Movement officially announced splitting. Members of the party who opposed boycotting the parliament and supported electing a new party chair opted to set up their own party. The breakaway entity took the largely unknown legal vehicle of a previous party European Georgia. A majority of the UNM's electoral list defected to European Georgia faction in the parliament, leaving the UNM with six members in parliament. Saakashvili thanked loyal members of the party for opposing efforts to "distance me from the party" and what he called "Ivanishvili's attempt to take over the United National Movement". He voiced the common belief among the UNM voters that these defections were encouraged by the ruling Georgian Dream Coalition in order to weaken its opposition. On 20 January, the UNM congress supported the proposal not to elect the party chairman until Mikheil Saakashvili would return to Georgia. The European Georgia members accused the UNM of "betraying the values of Rose Revolution" and turning to populism. In an interview with the online news website Netgazeti, Giorgi Ugulava distinguished the EG as being more liberal than the UNM, specifically describing the UNM as populist and communitarian.

The UNM had no official chairman until 24 March 2019, when Saakashvili was succeeded as the UNM party's chairman by his own nominee, Grigol Vashadze.

== Return to Georgia ==
Prior to 2021 Georgian local elections, Saakashvili promised his supporters to return to Georgia.

Nevertheless, Saakashvili's statements stirred significant controversy in Georgia, with high-ranking Georgian officials saying that Saakashvili would be arrested and sent to prison for his crimes. These statements were made on the basis of Tbilisi City Court decisions in 2018, which condemned Saakashvili for six years in prison for abuse of power, embezzlement and his role in the organization of a grievous bodily injury against an opposition lawmaker Valery Gelashvili. Saakashvili and his supporters denounced these verdicts as politically motivated.

On 1 October 2021, Saakashvili claimed to have returned to Georgia after an eight-year absence, and called on his followers to march on the capital, Tbilisi. He published a video on Facebook, claiming that he was in Batumi. The Georgian police, however, claimed that Saakashvili had not crossed the country's border. Irakli Kobakhidze, chairman of the Georgian ruling party Georgian Dream, said that the video was "deepfake" and urged the voters to remain calm. Mamuka Mdinaradze, one of the leaders of Georgian Dream, claimed: "He [Saakashvili] is in Ukraine, we have specific information that this person did not leave Ukraine, did not go to another country, this person is in Ukraine, he is trapped somewhere in a hole, he hides from everyone to create the illusion that he is in Georgia".

The video was shared and discussed on social media, before the story began to appear on Georgia's TV channels. For several hours, both pro-government and opposition TV channels actively engaged in the debate over Saakashvili's alleged homecoming video and whereabouts. At the same time, pro-Saakashvili Mtavari Arkhi TV featured a news program titled "Saakashvili is in Georgia", while pro-government Imedi TV featured a news program titled "Saakashvili is in Ukraine". Georgia's Ministry of Internal Affairs reported that special forces were sent to Batumi in operation to detain Saakashvili.

A few moments later, Georgian Prime Minister Irakli Gharibashvili announced at a briefing together with the Minister of Internal Affairs Vakhtang Gomelauri and the head of the State Security Service Grigol Liluashvili that Mikheil Saakashvili was under arrest. Soon a video was published featuring handcuffed Saakashvili being taken into prison N12 in Rustavi. According to the investigation, Saakashvili entered the country secretly, hiding in a semi-trailer truck loaded with milk products. He illegally crossed the state border of Georgia, bypassing the customs control. He was arrested in Tbilisi by the police and taken to the prison in Rustavi.

President of Georgia Salome Zourabichvili stated that she would "never" pardon Saakashvili. On 3 November 2021 Zourabichvili confirmed her first statement again.

Saakashvili began a hunger strike in protest of what he considered as the state's refusal to give him a fair trial on charges which he thought would "destroy him and Georgia". On 10 October 2021, his personal doctor asked authorities to move him to hospital as he continued with his hunger strike since his arrest and his health condition had allegedly worsened.

On 14 October 2021, tens of thousands protested on Tbilisi's Rustaveli Avenue, demanding the release of Saakashvili from prison. Nika Melia, a leader of the United National Movement, came under criticism for ending a demonstration without presenting a plan of action or scheduling further protests, some even questioning his ability to lead the party and his loyalty to Saakashvili, pointing at the alleged internal power struggle within the party between Melia and Saakashvili. Melia responded to criticism by denying the existence of any conflict.

Georgia's rights ombudsman stated that Saakashvili was not being given proper medical care and was being abused by fellow inmates. The State Inspector's Service of Georgia launched a criminal investigation into alleged inhuman treatment of Mikheil Saakashvili. Since 1 March 2022, the Special Investigation Service of Georgia has continued investigating instead of the State Inspector's Service.

On 8 November 2021, Saakashvili was moved to Gldani penitentiary hospital. On 19 November 2021, Saakashvili was transferred to a Gori military hospital. Saakashvili's doctor Nokoloz Kipshidze and lawyer Nika Gvaramia stated that Saakashvili would end the 50-day hunger strike.

On 12 December 2021, Otar Toidze, a doctor with Georgia's human rights commissioner said Saakashvili was in need of specialist treatment abroad. On 29 December 2021, he was taken from hospital to prison of Rustavi, according to oppositional leaders and media his health conditions were still bad, and he was still continuing decreasing weight, according to his lawyer Nika Gvaramia.

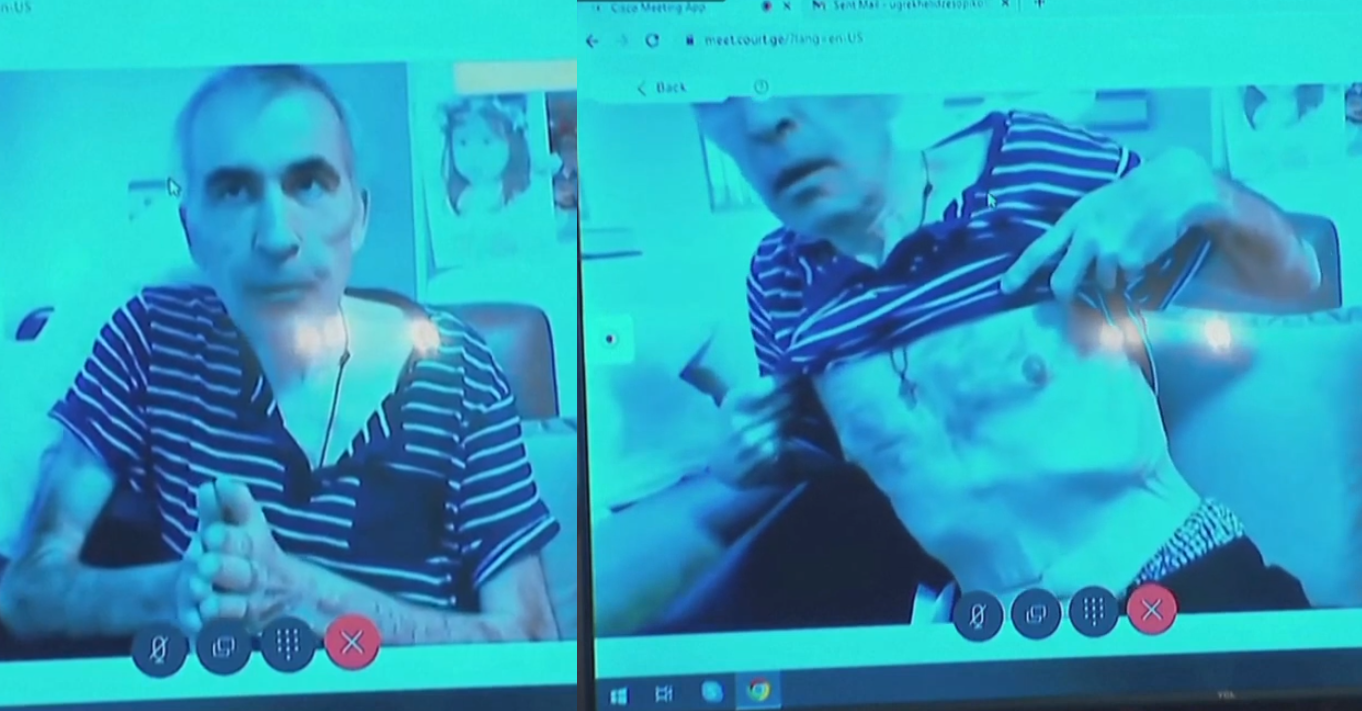
Saakashvili showing court how much weight he has lost

On 12 May 2022, Saakashvili was transferred to a civilian hospital in Tbilisi. On 1 December 2022, Saakashvili's lawyers appealed the court to either postpone Saakashvili's sentence or release him from prison on medical grounds. On 24 January 2023, Saakashvili tested positive for COVID-19. On 1 February, Saakashvili testified before the court remotely. He appeared to have lost a lot of weight, as evidenced by protruding ribs and stomach. According to his lawyer, Saakashvili, who is 190 cm in height, weighs only 69.7 kilograms, has lost 52 kilograms since 1 October 2021, and cannot move without a wheelchair. Despite this, the Court did not deem this sufficient and did not satisfy the motion of the defence in the case on the postponement of Saakashvili's sentence or his release. In March 2023, Poland suggested sending doctors to Georgia to examine Saakashvili amid concerns about his health.

While imprisoned, Saakashvili has remained politically active. In August 2023, Newsweek published an extensive opinion piece by Saakashvili, in which he reflected on his decision to return to Georgia and the challenges he had faced in prison, writing:

There was a time a year ago, as my health was declining dramatically and death felt imminent, when I regretted coming back to Georgia. I thought to myself that if I survived this ordeal, if I tasted freedom again, I would leave Georgian politics behind for good. I felt my sacrifice had been a miscalculation, a folly. But even when I tried to turn my back on Georgian politics, Georgian politics kept returning to me. I have come to recognize that even as a prisoner with limited contact with the outside, I have a crucial role to play in Georgia's future, a role I cannot just walk away from.

=== Coup plot accusation ===
On 18 September 2023, the State Security Service of Georgia (SSG) accused Saakashvili and his followers of plotting with the Ukrainian government and Georgian Legion (a group of mostly ethnic Georgian volunteers fighting on behalf of Ukraine) of planning a coup d'état against the Georgian government. The SSG claimed that anti-government protests were being planned by Ukrainian intelligence for October and December 2023. The Russian government filed eight criminal cases against Georgian Legion's commander Mamuka Mamulashvili and placed a bounty to capture him. Mamulashvili stated that the claims of a coup were baseless, and that they were evidence that Georgian Dream is a Russophilic party.

=== International reaction to Saakashvili's arrest ===
Saakashvili's arrest led to major criticism from the Ukrainian government, European Parliament, U.S. State Department and international organizations. International criticism was focused on alleged violation of Saakashvili's human rights in prison, as well as on allegedly politically motivated legal proceedings against him. On 1 October 2021, Ukrainian President Volodymyr Zelenskyy also stated he would work to ensure Saakashvili's release, as Saakashvili is a Ukrainian citizen who was stripped of his Georgian citizenship in 2015. This was criticized by Georgian authorities. Georgian Prime Minister Irakli Garibashvili said that Saakashvili would leave Georgia only after serving his time in prison. On 9 November, after Saakashvili was transferred to Gldani prison hospital, Amnesty International uploaded a statement on Twitter, about Saakashvili: "#Georgia: ex-President #Saakashvili (5th week of hunger strike) violently transferred to prison hospital; allegedly threatened; denied dignity, privacy & adequate healthcare. Not just selective justice but apparent political revenge." On 18 November 2021, the U.S. State Department urged the Government of Georgia to treat Saakashvili fairly and guarantee his right to a fair trial, and also praised the independent medical team that criticized the prison conditions. On 28 June 2022, Parliamentary Assembly of the Council of Europe has published declaration, in which they have said that Mikheil Saakashvili has to be treated immediately in a special institution abroad. On 14 December 2022, the European Parliament passed a resolution which urged the Georgian government to release Saakashvili on medical grounds to be treated abroad, while threatening to sanction Bidzina Ivanishvili, a founder of Georgian Dream party, for his role in "deteriorating the democratic political process in Georgia" .

On 4 December 2022, Moldovan President Maia Sandu stated that she is "deeply concerned" about imprisoned ex-President Mikheil Saakashvili's "rapidly deteriorating state of health."

On 14 February 2023, the European Parliament adopted a third non-binding resolution, accusing the Georgian government and Bidzina Ivanishvili of mistreating Mikheil Saakashvili in prison, once again calling for his release from prison and personal sanctions on Ivanishvili. President Sandu also emphasized, "every human life is priceless and the gravity of the situation requires immediate transfer of Saakashvili to an appropriate hospital to save his life." Belarusian President Alexander Lukashenko also expressed his concerns about Saakashvili's health.

Following Saakashvili's hearing in the court in February 2023, President of Ukraine Volodymyr Zelenskyy accused the Georgian government of "publicly torturing" Ukrainian citizen Saakashvili and he claimed that "Russia is killing Ukrainian citizen Mikheil Saakashvili with the hands of the Georgian authorities." According to Zelenskyy, Ukraine had "repeatedly called on official Tbilisi to stop this mockery and agree on the return of Saakashvili to Ukraine."

President Zelenskyy has instructed the Ministry of Foreign Affairs to summon the Georgian Ambassador to Ukraine, expressing a strong protest and requesting his departure within 48 hours for consultations with his capital in Tbilisi about transferring Saakashvili in Ukraine. Zelenskyy published a statement on Twitter:

Right now, Russia is killing Ukrainian citizen Mykhailo Saakashvili at the hands of the Georgian authorities. We have repeatedly called on the official Tbilisi to stop this abuse and agree on Saakashvili's return to Ukraine. Our partners, in coordination with Ukraine, have also...

On 12 July 2023, former US Ambassadors to Georgia issued a statement urging the Government of Georgia to allow "imprisoned and emaciated former president Mikheil Saakashvili to obtain life-saving medical treatment".

With their letter, the Ambassadors William Harrison Courtney (1995–1997), Kenneth Spencer Yalowitz (1998–2001), Richard Monroe Miles (2002–2005), John F. Tefft (2005–2009), and Ian C. Kelly (2015–2018), joined the international concerns which have escalated following the frail and decimated appearance of former President Mikheil Saakashvili during a remote court hearing.

On 14 July 2023, 44 Members of European Parliament has written a letter addressed to President Zurabishvili, Parliamentary Speaker Papuashvili, and Prime Minister Garibashvili urging to transfer former Georgian President Mikheil Saakashvili to one of the European Union member states. The MEPs stressed the need for Saakashvili to receive the necessary and appropriate medical care.

==== Reaction of Georgian government ====
Criticism led to heavy squabbles between Georgian government and Ukrainian and European leadership, as well as Western and international organizations. Georgian officials argued that legal proceedings against Saakashvili met all necessary legal standards and accused Saakashvili of using "international lobbysts" to pressure the government to release him. They have based their claims on documents published on U.S. Foreign Agents Registration Unit website, which contained information about Saakashvili's and his family members' spendings on lobbyists in the US, which were tasked with working on convincing U.S. congressmen and senators to impose sanctions against Georgia.

In response to criticism about Saakashvili's deteriorating health, Georgian officials claimed Saakashvili was trying to evade prison through self-harm. In particular, Georgian Justice Minister Rati Bregadze said that Saakashvili is trying to evade prison through self-harm. He stated that there is no relevant evidence of Saakashvili being tortured and noted that the state "can not be held responsible for self-harm by the inmate, including his refusal to follow medical prescriptions". Georgian officials claimed that this was part of a plan to pressure the government to release Saakashvili.

Georgian Prime Minister Irakli Garibashvili accused Ukraine of sending Saakashvili from Ukraine to overthrow the Georgian government. However, according to Garibashvili, Saakashvili was arrested and the Ukrainian Government asked Tbilisi to release Saakashvili to Kyiv. Georgian Prime Minister claimed at a speech in parliament that the Ukrainian Government and the Georgian opposition are close ideological partners.

In response to criticism from the European Parliament, Georgia's Prime Minister Irakli Garibashvili said that Saakashvili is "agent of the European Parliament". "The European Parliament has explicitly recognised with its shameful resolution that Saakashvili is their agent and they are doing everything to save their agent and get him out of prison. This is not going to happen. We told them and many of our international partners that Saakashvili committed many serious crimes and now the illegal border crossing has been added", said Garibashvili.

The Georgian officials justified their positions based on the decisions of the European Court of Human Rights (ECHR). In 2011, the ECHR ruled on the ENUKIDZE AND GIRGVLIANI v. GEORGIA case, a high-profile murder case of head of the United Georgian Bank's Foreign Department Sandro Girgvliani, for which Saakashvili was convicted, saying that the state violated Girgvliani's right to life and that the government, the courts and the parliament coordinated to obstruct justice and free the criminals of their liability. In 2023, Saakashvili filed a case in the ECHR, stating that his rights had been violated in prison and calling the Court to order his transferral to a hospital in Warsaw in Poland. The Court rejected Saakashvili's request. In response, Georgian officials praised the Court. The ruling party chairman Irakli Kobakhidze said that the European Court remained a bastion of justice, unlike the European Parliament, which he described as having become trapped in corruption.

== Appraisal ==
Saakashvili's government has been lauded by the World Bank for making "striking improvements" in the fight against corruption. In addition, the US State Department noted that in 2005 "the government amended several laws and increased the amount of investigations and prosecutions reducing the amount of abuse and ill-treatment in pre-trial detention facilities". The status of religious freedom also improved due to increased investigation and prosecution of those harassing followers of non-traditional faiths.

The scrupulousness of Patarkatsishvili's political opposition toward the Georgian president has been questioned by the Jamestown Foundation's political analyst Vladimir Socor who attributed the businessman's discontent to Saakashvili's anti-corruption reforms, which "had severely curtailed Patarkatsishvili's scope for doing business in his accustomed, post-Soviet 1990s-style ways." Patarkatsishvili—who had fled the Russian authorities after allegations of fraud—was called "a state criminal" by Saakashvili, who accused him of treason while refusing to admit to any of his accusations.

Saakashvili was portrayed by Cuban-American Hollywood actor Andy García in the 2010 Hollywood film 5 Days of War by Finnish-American film director Renny Harlin. The film tells the story of Saakashvili and the events during the Russo-Georgian War.

== Controversies ==
=== Allegation of authoritarianism ===
In the 2010 study Competitive Authoritarianism: Hybrid Regimes After the Cold War, political scientists Steven Levitsky and Lucan A. Way cite various media and human rights reports to describe Saakashvili's Georgia as a "competitive authoritarian" (i.e., a formally democratic but essentially non-democratic) state.

=== Ordering beating of Valery Gelashvili ===
On 14 July 2005, businessman and Republican member of parliament Valery Gelashvili was beaten by unknown people. Gelashvili suffered skull trauma, numerous fractures of facial bones, lacerations in the nose and forehead, and fractures of the bones of the upper and lower jaw. The incident occurred after daily newspaper Rezonansi published an interview with Gelashvili, in which he talked about a conflict between him and Saakashvili over the former's house and made comments about Saakashvili's personal life. In 2004, Gelashvili was requested by authorities to hand over his apartment building to the state after the government decided to transform the nearby Road Traffic Police building into the new presidential residence. Gelashvili agreed but requested the construction works of the new presidential residence to be carried out by his construction firm Evra. Gelashvili alleged in the interview that the government had not paid the firm for construction. He later blamed authorities and Saakashvili for ordering his attack. When the new government came into power in 2012, they promised to start investigation. On 28 June 2018, the Tbilisi City Court sentenced Mikheil Saakashvili to six years in prison in absentia for, among other crimes, ordering the attack on Gelashvili. Saakashvili was also banned from taking any state post for two years and three months.

=== Violent dispersal of 2007 protests ===
Saakashvili received widespread criticism for his handling of the 2007 Georgian demonstrations, which were violently dispersed by the police using heavy-handed tactics. Saakashvili came under criticism for using rubber bullets and tear gas against protesters who were blocking Tbilisi's main transport artery, Rustaveli Avenue.

=== Allegations of corruption ===
Saakashvili has been accused of corruption and amassing wealth after coming into power by his political opponents. Although petty corruption in Georgia has been largely eliminated by the Saakashvili administration, it was alleged that elite corruption remained a significant problem. Alleged corruption in Saakashvili's inner circle was one of the main causes of the 2007 Georgian demonstrations. Former Minister of Defense Irakli Okruashvili after his resignation accused Saakashvili of corruption and lobbying the interests of his own family. Okruashvili claimed that he caught the president's uncle with a $200,000 bribe but had to hush up the scandal at the president's request. It was alleged that Saakashvili's family members acquired large number of state property by Saakashvili's orders, and as a result, Saakashvili's family emerged as one of the richest families in Georgia by the end of his second term. According to allegations, Saakashvili's family has taken over much of the higher education sector (his mother owning shares in several universities in Tbilisi), the spa industry and the advertisement sector. The opposition also accused then-President Saakashvili of overseeing a system of elite corruption encompassing oil and minerals. Saakashvili denied accusations of his political opponents, claiming that his administration has been one of the most successful in eliminating corruption. He accused his opponents of spreading lies and not being honest.

After leaving the presidency, Saakashvili was charged by the Prosecutor's Office of Georgia with illegal seizure of property and embezzlement of state funds. He allegedly spent the money on luxury hotels, visits to cosmetic clinics, expensive clothing and other things. He and his supporters have denounced the charges as politically motivated. On 12 March 2025, Saakashvili was convicted and sentenced to nine years' imprisonment for embezzling nine million laris ($3.2 million) in public funds from 2009 to 2012. Georgia's opposition said that the sentence showed that the government is scared of Saakashvili. On 17 March, he was convicted and sentenced to another 4.5 years' imprisonment for illegally entry into Georgia over his return in 2021.

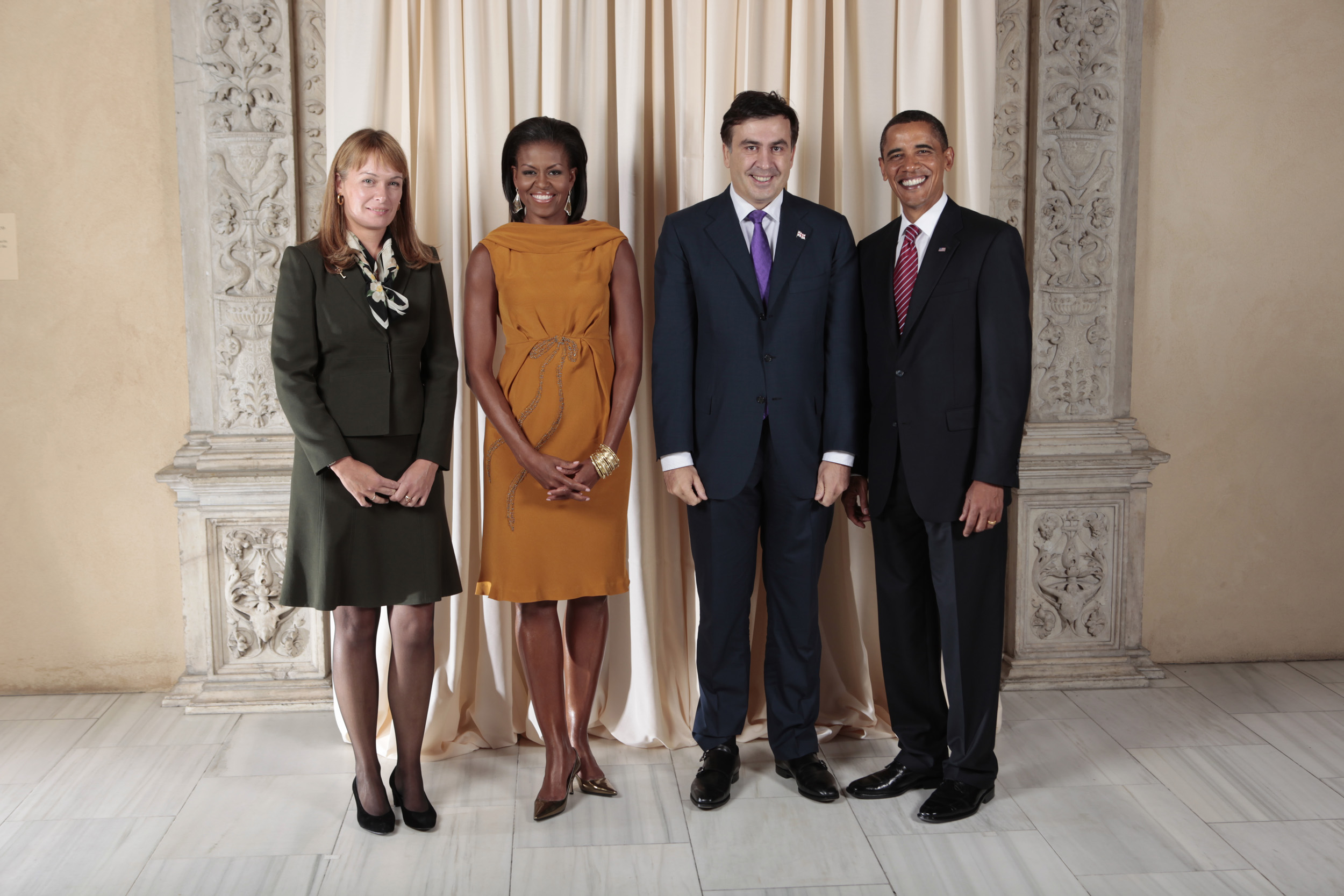
Sandra Roelofs, Michelle Obama, Mikheil Saakashvili and Barack Obama in 2009

== Personal life ==
Saakashvili is married to Dutch linguist Sandra Roelofs, whom he met in Strasbourg in 1993. The couple have two sons, Eduard and Nikoloz.

A few days before Saakashvili's October 2021 return to Georgia he recorded a video on Facebook with Ukrainian MP Yelyzaveta Yasko in which they disclosed they were having a romantic relationship. A few days later Yasko remarked that Sandra Roelofs was Saakashvili's "ex-wife". There had been no media reports that Saakashvili and his spouse Roelofs had divorced. Roelofs had been "caught by surprise" by Yasko's and Saakashvili's video announcement and remarked on Facebook on 7 October that "its form was absolutely unacceptable." On 31 December of the same year, Saakashvili recognized to have an extramarital daughter, Elis-Maria, with singer Sofia Nizharadze, calling her "my most lovely girl and youngest child". On 1 June 2023 Yasko revealed that she and Saakashvili had become parents, the gender and birthdate of the baby were not announced. At the time of birth Saakashvili was imprisoned.

Apart from his native Georgian, Saakashvili speaks fluent English, Russian, French and Ukrainian, and has some command of Spanish as well as Ossetian. Some non-Georgian sources spell Saakashvili's first name using the Russian spelling, Mikhail. In Georgia, he is commonly known as Misha, a hypocorism for Mikheil. Saakashvili enjoys exercise and has in the past often been seen in public on his bicycle.

== Electoral history ==
Election	Affiliation	First round			Second round		
Election	Affiliation	Votes	Percentage	Position	Votes	Percentage	Position
2004	United National Movement	1,890,739	96.24%	1st			
2008	United National Movement	1,060,042	54.73%	1st			

== Notes ==
Political offices
Preceded by Nino Burjanadze; Acting	President of Georgia; 2004–2007	Succeeded by Nino Burjanadze; Acting
Preceded by Nino Burjanadze; Acting	President of Georgia; 2008–2013	Succeeded by Giorgi Margvelashvili
