= Bruce Jackson =

Bruce Jackson may refer to:

- Bruce Jackson (audio engineer) (1949–2011), Australian audio electronics design engineer, concert sound engineer
- Bruce P. Jackson (born 1952), president of the Project on Transitional Democracies
- Bruce Jackson (scholar) (born 1936), American folklorist, documentary filmmaker, and photographer
- Bruce Jackson (sprinter) (born 1983), American sprinter, 2006 All-American for the Washington Huskies track and field team

== See also ==
- Albert Bruce Jackson (1876–1947), British botanist
