= Rend al-Rahim Francke =

Iraqi diplomat (born 1949)

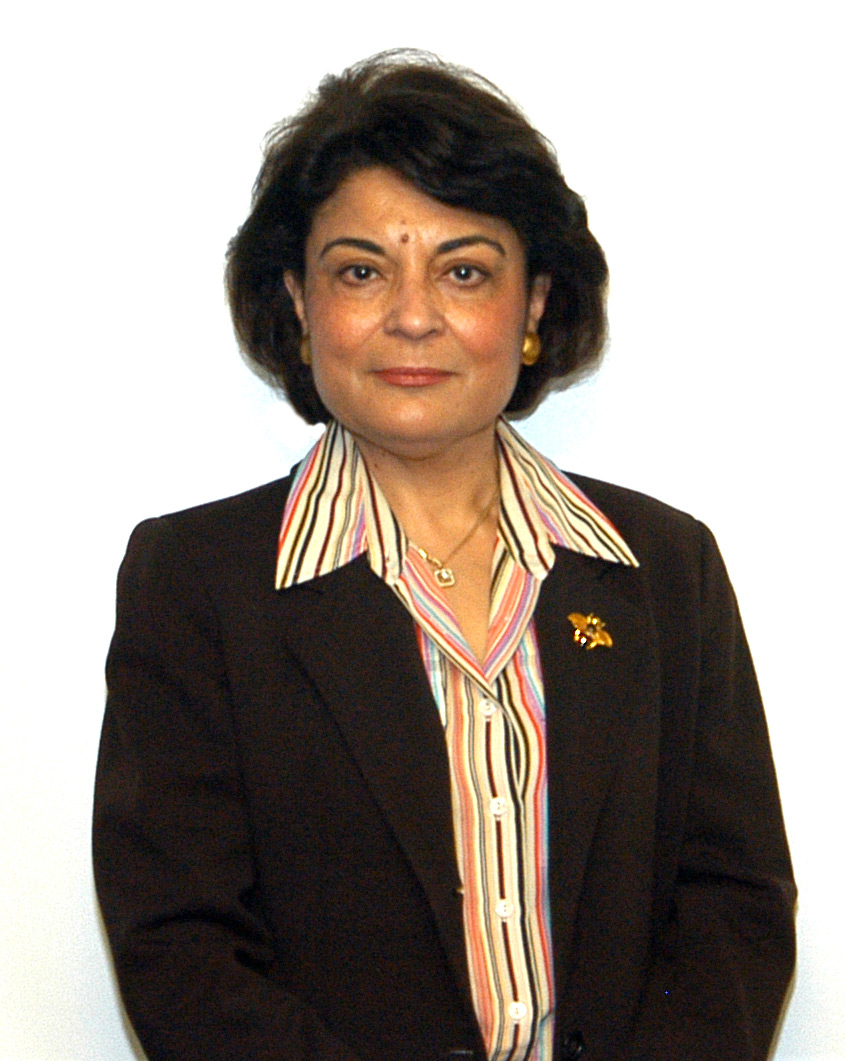
- Francke

Iraqi Chief of Mission to the United States
- In office November 2003 – March 2005

Personal details
- Born: 1949 (age 76–77) Baghdad, Iraq
- Citizenship: United States
- Children: 1
- Education: University of Cambridge; Sorbonne
- Occupation: Diplomat, political activist, author

Rend al-Rahim Francke (born 1949) is an Iraqi political activist who often appears on various current affairs programs. She held the position as Iraqi ambassador to the United States. She is considered to be a secularist trying to enable Iraq to transition to a liberal democratic model.

== Personal life ==
Francke was born in Baghdad to an affluent family and spent some of her childhood there. Her father is a Shiite Muslim and her mother is a Sunni Muslim. She went to boarding school in England and later studied at Cambridge University where she earned a master's degree in English and at the Sorbonne. She worked as a banker and a currency trader in Lebanon and Bahrain, as well as London. Her family moved to England in 1978 and later emigrated again, this time to the United States in 1981. She became an American citizen in 1987.

Rend is married and has one child.

== Politics and advocacy ==
In 1991, Francke established the Iraq Foundation in Washington, D.C., to lobby for democracy, human rights and regime change in Iraq. In her role as executive director she represented the foundation with government and non-government institutions, including speaking before Congress to the Senate Foreign Relations Committee.

Francke has been an ally of the Bush administration in its Iraq foreign policy and is sympathetic of its neoconservative foreign policy. She is quite liberal though with respect to domestic policy. A staunch secularist, she did not cover her hair when she was ambassador for Iraq and continues to oppose fundamentalist politics in Iraq. She was part of the Committee for the Liberation of Iraq which was set up to lobby Congress to pursue the administration's goal of invading Iraq and removing Saddam Hussein from power. In 2002 she testified in front of the United States Senate Foreign Relations Committee and emphasized the long-term commitment needed to rebuild Iraq. She promoted 'Nation Building', emphasizing law and order as well as the prevention of retribution. In particular she did not want a repeat of the Afghanistan operation where the United States minimized its immediate efforts in its rebuilding after the fall of the Taliban, calling such an operation, "a hit-and-run". She also thought it unlikely that Iraq would break up into three components.

Francke was appointed to the position of Iraqi ambassador to the United States on November 23, 2003. This was very unusual given that she was also a United States citizen. However, in October 2004 she was forced to resign due to American pressure for various reasons. They included the fact that she had made critical comments over U.S. handling of post-war Iraq in testimony to Congress and on TV interviews, that she was a cousin and close associate of Ahmed Chalabi, then under investigation for leaking intelligence to Iran, and for her apparent refusal to lead a delegation on a visit to wounded U.S. troops at Walter Reed Army Hospital.

In 2004, she was a guest of Laura Bush in the First Lady's Box at the State of the Union address. The Iraq Foundation (an organization she co-founded) itself help set up the Iraq-America Freedom Alliance which has tried to stress the positive impacts of the American invasion and occupation of Iraq. It describes its mission as publicizing "the stories of Iraqis and Americans who are building a secure, stable and democratic future in Iraq." She has said that she is disappointed with the post-war reconstruction effort, especially the initial lack of planning. However she continues to support the administration and its policies particularly as they have grown more determined to stabilize Iraq and has confidence that the US administration can be successful. On April 27, 2007, she appeared on the O'Reilly Factor and argued strongly for the United States' presence in Iraq.

== Views ==
Francke is a supporter of the United States and the Bush administration, but also has heavily criticized its role, which many believe led to her resignation. Moreover, Francke also criticized the role of Iraqis towards the United States. In a recent interview conducted by the Greater Good Science Center, Francke said, "I think there's a great deal of negligence. It's not evil; its negligence and insensitivity... and I don't think it's possible to keep a healthy relationship unless you show that you care about a person, or a group of people, on a continuing basis." Francke claims that sympathy and empathy on both sides are needed if Iraq is to be repaired. She concluded, "It is all a question of showing that you care about the other, that you're in a partnership - not a relationship of occupier and occupied. You're not in a relationship where it's the all-powerful and the powerless."

== Bibliography ==
- Fuller, Graham E.; Francke, Rend Rahim (2000). The Arab Shi'a : The Forgotten Muslims. Palgrave Macmillan. ISBN 0-312-22178-9.
