= Bush Pioneer =

Political bundlers supporting George W. Bush

Bush Pioneers are people who gathered $100,000 for George W. Bush's 2000 or 2004 presidential campaign. Two new levels, Bush Rangers and Super Rangers, were bestowed upon supporters who gathered $200,000+ or $300,000+, respectively, for the 2004 campaign, after the 2002 McCain–Feingold campaign finance law raised hard money contribution limits. This was done through the practice of "bundling" contributions. There were 221 Rangers and 327 Pioneers in the 2004 campaign and 241 Pioneers in the 2000 campaign (550 pledged to try). A fourth level, Bush Mavericks, was used to identify fundraisers under 40 years of age who bundled more than $50,000.

The Pioneer system was devised by Karl Rove. The network has roots in Texan GOP donor lists compiled by Rove, whose political roots are in direct-mail solicitation in the 1980s.

Nineteen of the original Pioneers became ambassadors in 2001. Six Pioneers have been convicted of politics-related crimes.

Pioneers were involved in the 2008 U.S. Presidential election. An analysis in 2006 found that 12 were supporting Rudy Giuliani, 21 supporting John McCain, and 16 supporting Mitt Romney. A July 2008 report found fewer than half of the 2004 Pioneers and Rangers had yet contributed their own money to McCain.

== Prominent Pioneers, Rangers and Mavericks ==
- Roland Arnall, founder of Ameriquest and former Ambassador to the Netherlands
- James A. Baker IV, son of James Baker
- Haley Barbour, Governor of Mississippi and former Republican National Committee Chairman
- Marvin Pierce Bush
- William DeWitt, Jr. of Cincinnati, head of an investment firm and co-owner of the St. Louis Cardinals
- Richard J. Egan, billionaire from Hopkinton, Massachusetts; founder of EMC Corp. and United States Ambassador to Ireland 2001–2003; his sons, Christopher and Michael, are also Bush Pioneers.
- Donald Evans
- Sam Fox, national chairman of the Republican Jewish Coalition
- Frank E. Fowler, art dealer from Lookout Mountain, Tennessee who represents the Andrew Wyeth estate
- James H. Harless, coal baron.
- Dennis Hastert, former Speaker of the House
- Ray Lee Hunt
- Ken Lay, former Enron CEO
- David B. Montgomery, Founder of Montgomery Law Firm (Houston)
- Robert Mosbacher, Mosbacher Energy Company
- Andrew Bissell
- Joe O'Neill, Texas oilman who introduced Mr. Bush to his wife, Laura
- David M. Miner, State Representative of North Carolina
- George E. Pataki, former Governor of New York State.
- Stephen Payne (lobbyist)
- Francis Rooney, United States Ambassador to the Holy See
- Robert Rowling
- Andrew Saul, Chairman of the Federal Retirement Thrift Investment Board
- Stephen A. Schwarzman, Chairman and CEO of private equity firm Blackstone Group
- Alex Spanos, Stockton, California real estate developer and owner of the San Diego Chargers.
- Nate Morris, CEO of Rubicon
- Craig Roberts Stapleton
- Jerry Weintraub, film producer, including Nashville and Ocean's Eleven.
- Jim Wilkinson
- Charles Wyly and Sam Wyly, Texas brothers who collectively represented Bush's 9th greatest career contributor.
- Aldona Wos, Physician, later United States Ambassador to Estonia, and wife of future U.S. Postmaster General Louis DeJoy.
