= Graham E. Fuller =

American author and political analyst (1936–2026)

- Born: November 28, 1936
- Died: January 29, 2026 (aged 89)
- Education: Harvard University
- Occupations: Political analyst, author
- Website: grahamefuller.com

Graham E. Fuller (November 28, 1936 – January 29, 2026) was an American author and political analyst, specializing in Islamic extremism. Formerly vice-chair of the National Intelligence Council, he also served as Station Chief in Kabul for the CIA. A "think piece" that Fuller wrote for the CIA was identified as instrumental in leading to the Iran–Contra affair. As of 2024, Fuller was a member of Veteran Intelligence Professionals for Sanity.

After a career in the United States State Department and CIA lasting 27 years, he joined Rand Corporation as senior political scientist specializing in the Middle East. As of 2006, he was affiliated with the Simon Fraser University in Vancouver, British Columbia, as an adjunct professor of history. He is the author of a number of books, including The Future of Political Islam.

== Education and career ==
Fuller attended Harvard University, where he earned first a BA and then an MA degree in Russian and Middle Eastern studies. Fuller joined the State Department, entering the Foreign Service for assignments in Europe, Asia, and the Middle East.

=== CIA ===
Fuller served 20 years as an operations officer in the CIA. Assignments include postings in: Germany, Turkey, Lebanon, Saudi Arabia, North Yemen, Afghanistan, and Hong Kong. Fuller was Kabul CIA Station Chief until 1978, when he was brought to CIA headquarters in Washington, where he was appointed National Intelligence Officer for Near East and South Asia in 1982. In 1986, the CIA appointed him vice-chairman of the National Intelligence Council.

=== Iran–Contra Affair ===
In 1987, Fuller was identified as the author of a 1985 study that, according to the New York Times, was "instrumental" in the decision of the Reagan Administration to secretly contact leaders in Iran and "eventually led to the covert sale of United States weapons to Tehran in what became the Iran–Contra affair." The document suggested that the Soviet Union was in position to influence Iran and that the United States might gain influence by selling arms to the country. According to Fuller, he had revised his opinion as the situation developed, but though he had told Government officials, a written report on the change was not circulated. Fuller denied that the original "think piece" he had prepared with Howard Teicher was "tailored ... to support Administration policy."

== After retirement ==
Fuller left the CIA in 1988 for the RAND Corporation, remaining as a senior political scientist until 2000. At the RAND Corporation he wrote, among many publications, on political Islam in various countries, and on the geopolitics of the Muslim world.

Fuller was an adjunct history professor at Simon Fraser University in Vancouver and at Quest University in Squamish BC. He speaks Turkish, Arabic, some Farsi, as well as Russian and Chinese. He also speaks French, German and Spanish.

In 2012 Fuller established Bozorg Press, his indie experiment in self-publishing. (Bozorg means "large" or "great" in Persian.)

On December 1, 2017, the Istanbul chief public prosecutor’s office issued an arrest warrant for Fuller based on his alleged involvement in the planning of the failed 2016 Turkish coup d'état attempt and a wealthy Turkish national offered a reward of 3-million Turkish lira (almost $800,000) for help in delivering Fuller and Michael Rubin to Turkey to answer the Turkish allegations. The Turkish arrest warrant alleges Fuller met with other individuals-of-interest-to-prosecutors on the island of Büyükada, near Istanbul, on the night of July 15, 2016, simultaneous to the attempted coup.

Fuller responded in December 2017: "On the night of the coup attempt in Turkey last year, I happened to have been addressing a group of 100 people or so right here in the town in western Canada where I have been living for the past 15 years." "I have not set foot in Turkey in the last five years."

In 2002, Fuller emigrated to Canada, where he obtained citizenship.

=== ISIS ===
A 2014 interview with Fuller quoted him as saying, "I think the United States is one of the key creators of [ISIS]. The United States did not plan the formation of ISIS, but its destructive interventions in the Middle East and the war in Iraq were the basic causes of the birth of ISIS".

== Death ==
Fuller died on January 29, 2026, at the age of 89, after suffering from serious heart-related health problems.

== Publications ==
=== Books ===
- The Center of the Universe: The Geopolitics of Iran. Westview Press. 1991. ISBN 0-8133-1158-6.
- The Democracy Trap: The Perils of the Post-Cold War World. E. P. Dutton. 1991. ISBN 0-525-93371-9.
- How to Learn a Foreign Language. Storm King. 1993. ISBN 0-935166-02-5.
- The Future of Political Islam (revised ed.). Palgrave Macmillan. 2003. ISBN 1-4039-6136-0.
- The New Turkish Republic: Turkey as a Pivotal State in the Muslim world. US Institute of Peace Press. 2008. ISBN 978-1-60127-019-1.
- A World Without Islam. Little, Brown & Company. 2010. ISBN 978-0-316-07288-5.
- Three Truths and a Lie. CreateSpace Independent Publishing Platform. 2012. ISBN 978-1479274314.
- Breaking Faith (novel). Bozorg Press. 2015. ISBN 9780993751417.
- Turkey and the Arab Spring: Leadership in the Middle East, Bozorg Press 2014
- Bear, A novel of the Great Bear Rain Forest and Eco-violence.” Bozorg Press, 2016
- Understanding Contemporary Islamic Crises in the Middle East: The Issues Beneath the Surface. Leiden University Press. 2017. ISBN 9789087282677.

=== Co-authored books ===
- Barkey, Henri J.; Graham E. Fuller (1998). Turkey's Kurdish Question. Rowman & Littlefield. ISBN 0-8476-8553-5.
- Francke, Rend Rahim; Graham E. Fuller (2001). The Arab Shi'a: The Forgotten Muslims. Palgrave Macmillan. ISBN 0-312-23956-4.
- Fuller, Graham E.; Ian O. Lesser (1995). A Sense of Siege: The Geopolitics of Islam and the West. Westview Press. ISBN 0-8133-2149-2.
- Fuller, Graham E.; Ian O. Lesser; Paul B. Henze; James F. Brown (1993). Turkey's New Geopolitics: From the Balkans to Western China. Westview Press. ISBN 0-8133-8660-8.
- Ronfeldt, David F.; John Arquilla, Arroyo Center, Graham E. Fuller, Melissa Fuller (1998). The Zapatista "Social Netwar" in Mexico. Rand Corporation. ISBN 0-8330-2656-9.
