= Randy Scheunemann =

American neoconservative lobbyist

- Born: Randall James Scheunemann; January 12, 1960 (age 66)
- Education: University of Minnesota, Twin; Cities; Tufts University
- Political party: Republican

Randall James "Randy" Scheunemann (born January 12, 1960) is an American neoconservative lobbyist. He is the President of the Committee for the Liberation of Iraq, which was created by the Project for the New American Century (PNAC), of which he is a board member. He was Trent Lott's National Security Aide and was an advisor to Defense Secretary Donald Rumsfeld on Iraq. He is a paid lobbyist for the country of Georgia and was 2008 presidential candidate John McCain's foreign policy aide.

== Family ==
Scheunemann moved with his parents to the neighborhood of River Hills, in Burnsville, Minnesota in 1965.

- Father: Paul Scheunemann, born 1926, died 2003. Mayor of Burnsville 1978-1982. Stricken with polio at age 15; used a wheelchair thereafter.
- Mother: Gladys (Olson), born 1932, died 2000

== Education and early career ==
Scheunemann attended public school in Burnsville, Minnesota: Sioux Trail elementary school (1966–1972), John Metcalf Junior High School (1972–1975) and finally Burnsville High School (1975–1978) from which he graduated in 1978.

Scheunemann has a degree from the University of Minnesota, and did graduate work at Tufts University. He moved to Capitol Hill in 1986, working in the office of Republican Senator Dave Durenberger. In 1993, he moved onto the staff of Republican Senator Bob Dole, as a foreign policy advisor. He left Dole's staff to work for Republican Senate Majority Leader Trent Lott.

== Lobbyist ==
In 1998, Scheunemann went to work for the public relations firm Mercury Group.

During the 2002 and early 2003 campaign by the George W. Bush administration to generate public support for the 2003 invasion of Iraq, Scheunemann had a close association with Iraq exile Ahmad Chalabi.

Until May 2008, Scheunemann was co-owner of a two-person Washington, D.C. lobbying firm, Orion Strategies, LLC. The firm has lobbied on behalf of the Open Society Policy Center, the Caspian Alliance, Lockheed Martin, BP, and the National Rifle Association of America, among foreign governments such as Latvia, Taiwan, Croatia, and Macedonia.

He is a member of the board of directors of the International Republican Institute.

== 2008 McCain presidential advisor ==
While the foreign affairs advisor to Republican presidential candidate John McCain, Scheunemann was also a registered foreign agent (lobbyist) for the Republic of Georgia.

On April 17, 2008, McCain spoke on the phone with Georgia President Mikheil Saakashvili about the situation in South Ossetia and Abkhazia, two troubled provinces that are considered part of Georgia but have been de facto independent since 1990. That same day, McCain issued a public statement condemning Russia and expressing strong support for the Georgian position. Also on that same day, Georgia signed a new, $200,000 lobbying contract with Scheunemann's firm, Orion Strategies. Scheunemann remained with Orion Strategies until May 15, when the McCain campaign imposed an anti-lobbyist policy and he was required to separate himself from the company.

In mid-July 2008, The Sunday Times linked Scheunemann to Stephen Payne, a lobbyist covertly filmed as he discussed a lobbying contract and offered to arrange meetings with Vice President Dick Cheney, Secretary of State Condoleezza Rice, and others, and recommended donations to the George W. Bush Presidential Library. Payne said Scheunemann had been "working with me on my payroll for five of the last eight years." In late October 2008, Politico regarded Scheunemann as a potential pick as the Assistant to the President for National Security Affairs if John McCain defeats Democratic candidate Barack Obama.

A day after the election, a CNN article claimed that Scheunemann had been fired by the McCain campaign a week earlier for "trashing" campaign staff and "positioning himself with Palin at the expense of John McCain's campaign message." A later article, however, stated that Scheunemann had not been fired, but that many of McCain's top staff wanted him fired and removed his access to his campaign email and Blackberry.

== After 2008 ==
Scheunemann has been focusing on his consulting firm called Orion Strategies, not to be confused with the strategic communications firm Orion Strategies that is based out of West Virginia. In 2013 Scheunemann was involved in a verbal altercation with Richard B. Spencer on a chairlift at Whitefish Mountain Resort. Later in 2013 the two men were involved in another altercation at the Big Mountain Club at the resort, and had to be separated by staff. Scheunemann told staff that he would assault Spencer if he saw him again. Both men resigned from the club following the second incident.
