= Stephen Payne (energy executive) =

American lobbyist and energy executive

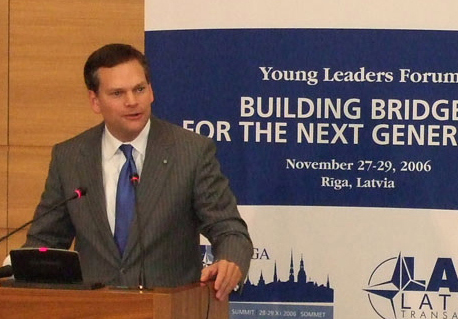
- Payne Speaking at NATO Summit in 2006.
- Born: May 8, 1964 (age 62); Houston, Texas, United States
- Education: Stephen F. Austin State University
- Occupation: lobbyist

Stephen Prentiss Payne (born May 8, 1964) is an American lobbyist from Houston, Texas. He has also served as a governmental, energy, international affairs, and international business development consultant, corporate and political adviser, foreign diplomat, businessman, fundraiser, and former adviser (June 2007 to July 2008) to two of the United States Department of Homeland Security's Advisory Committees—the Secure Borders and Open Doors Advisory Committee (SBODAC) and the Essential Technology Task Force (ETTF), in connection with which he held a U.S. security clearance.

In July 2008 he attracted international attention after being secretly videotaped discussing a $750,000 lobbying contract offering access to senior U.S. officials and suggesting a $250,000 donation to the future presidential library of U.S. president George W. Bush.

== Early life ==
Payne is the son of Jerry and Marianne Payne, in Houston, Texas. He studied Political Science at Stephen F. Austin State University (1982 to 1987). His father Jerry is a lawyer and was a longtime adviser of the state senator J. E. "Buster" Brown. Alliance & Co. president of Worldwide Strategic Energy Stephen P. Payne Alliance & Co. (a sister company to Worldwidethe investment firm Envion Worldwide, and Strategic Limited Partner for the global investment firm MSH Ventures.

In 2001, Payne served as Senior Advisor to the NASA Administrator on White House and Congressional Affairs.

== International relations ==
Payne has served as Honorary Consul General for the Republic of Latvia for the South central U.S. region (with headquarters in Houston) since 1999, and has served as an adviser to Latvian president Vaira Vīķe-Freiberga on political and economic issues. In 2004, President Freiberga awarded Payne Latvia's highest state honor, the Order of the Three Stars, for his work in helping Latvia become a NATO member. For the 2006 NATO Summit in Riga, Latvia, Payne was appointed by NATO to lead a think tank conference panel discussion on energy security and chair a NATO Future Leaders Forum bringing together up-and-coming leaders from 35 NATO member and partner countries. He has also served on the board of directors of the U.S.-Baltic Foundation, which promotes free markets in the Baltic States.

In April 2006, Payne helped arrange an official meeting between the Azerbaijani president Ilham Aliyev and U.S. president George W. Bush in April 2006, something the Azerbaijani president had been attempting for three years.

He also assisted in having the Uzbek opposition politician Muhammad Salih's name removed from Interpol's arrest warrant list and from the U.S.'s terrorist watchlist.

Payne also assisted Turkmenistan in assembling a consortium of nations and international firms to build a natural gas pipeline from Turkmenistan to Pakistan. Payne coordinated a trilateral summit between the Presidents of Turkmenistan, Afghanistan and Pakistan that produced a memorandum of understanding regarding the Turkmen/Afghan natural gas pipeline, restoring the project's viability after years of dormancy at the hands of the Taliban.

He has also lobbied on behalf of the governments of Turkmenistan and the United Arab Emirates, and performed consulting in Iraq, which he has visited twice. He has also served on the board of the National Defense University Foundation.

The lobbyist Randy Scheunemann has collaborated with Payne's firms on international matters since 2002, and Payne has also partnered in his various business ventures with Frank Carlucci, Michael S. Han, Ying Wang, and W. Dieter Zander.

In 2010, leading a public relations team, Payne assisted Alexi Ogando, now a starting pitcher for the Texas Rangers (baseball), in obtaining his U.S. visa. Ogando had been permanently banned from the U.S. in 2005 because of his involvement in a human trafficking ring.

In April 2011, Payne co-led a private, non-official U.S. diplomacy delegation to Libya, which included former U.S Congressman Curt Weldon, just after the February 17th uprising. Theirs was the first delegation visiting Tripoli to publicly call for Muammar Gaddafi to step down. According to a press release from Curt Weldon, their delegation was also working toward the release of Libyan rape victim, Iman al-Obeidi, and four captive journalists, including U.S. journalists Clare Gillis and James Foley.

== Bush White House activities ==
During the 1988 presidential campaign, Payne served as the travel aide to George W. Bush.

Payne served The White House as a "senior presidential advance representative" to George W. Bush, traveling with him as a volunteer to Jordan for the Red Sea Summit in June 2003. Payne also traveled with Dick Cheney to the Middle East in 2002 and 2005, to South Korea in 2004, to Kazakhstan in 2006, and to Afghanistan for the inauguration of Hamid Karzai in December 2004. Payne was a part of a small team of Bush operatives, which included former White House Chief of Staff Andy Card, which assisted the 2000 campaign in coordinating the three presidential debates.

He has also been a Dubya Ranch Hand (2003), and was a Bush Ranger in 2004 and a Bush Pioneer in 2000 and 2004.

== Other political activities ==
He is a member of the Republican Party and has been active in various Republican causes since the late 1980s. He was a member of the staff of Kay Bailey Hutchison from 1993 to 1996 and served as State Vice Chairman of her 2000 and 2006 re-election campaigns. In the 1996 presidential election he worked on the Dole-Kemp campaign. He assisted with the 2004 Bush-Cheney campaign, the Senate campaign of Pete Coors for Senate, the Restore America PAC, the Rudolph Giuliani Presidential Committee (on the National Security Advisory Task Force), and the Tom DeLay Congressional Committee.

According to Federal Election Commission records, since 1998 Payne has contributed more than $249,000 to Republican candidates and Republican Party committees.

== Controversy ==
In July 2008 Payne was secretly videotaped discussing a $750,000 lobbying contract and offering access to senior U.S. officials (including Dick Cheney, Condoleezza Rice, and Joe Biden) to the exiled Kazakhstani politician Yerzhan Dosmukhamedov (known as Eric Dos for short), and suggesting a $250,000 donation to the future George W. Bush Presidential Library.

In the conversation, which was secretly taped by The Sunday Times at a meeting in the restaurant of The Lanesborough hotel in London, Dosmukhamedov claimed that the former Kyrgyz president Askar Akayev wished to rehabilitate his image and meet with the U.S. officials. Payne has claimed that he did nothing wrong, and stated that he was there to recruit a new legitimate lobbying client and that it was Dos who first raised the issue of a donation in his initial e-mail to Payne. The Sunday Times has released only 4 minutes and 31 seconds of the hour-long meeting and Payne claims that the unreleased portion of the video would show that he was at the meeting to solicit a lobbying client and that the release of the entire tape would dispel The Sunday Times version of the video where Payne claims his comments were edited and taken out of context. Payne was asked to resign from the Homeland Security Advisory Committees directly following the July 13, 2008 publication of the article. U.S. Representative Henry Waxman, on behalf of the United States House Committee on Oversight and Government Reform, wrote a letter to Payne one day later, on July 14, 2008, requesting further details and background about this incident, and asked Payne to respond to his letter within ten days. Payne responded to the committee within ten days and Congress adjourned two months later without any further action from the House Committee.
