= Yerzhan Dosmukhamedov =

Kazakhstani politician

Yerzhan Dosmukhamedov (Kazakh: Ержан Қалиұлы Досмұхамедов, Erjan Qaliūly Dosmūhamedov) is a Kazakhstani politician and former head of the Atameken National Union of Entrepreneurs and Employers of Kazakhstan. Having founded his opposition political party "Atameken" and falling out of favor with the corrupt ruling elite, he now lives in London.

== Biography ==
Dosmukhamedov graduated with distinction from Saint Petersburg State University Faculty of Law, then earned an MA in law in the United States. After earning his doctorate degree at Oxford, he spent a year as an academic intern at Yale's law program.

From 1999 to 2002, he was a fellow and member of the law faculty of the University of Oxford, president of The Oxford banking forum. From 2002 to 2003 he was a professor and dean of the law department at the Kazakh-American University. He worked at KazMunaiGaz, and has served as an adviser to Timur Kulibayev.

[In 1992-1996] Dosmukhamedov served as a senior legal consultant at the first post-independence Parliament of Kazakhstan and in the presidential administration as an assistant and later chief of staff to the vice-president Erik Asanbayev and supervised KIMEP under the president, Nursultan Nazarbayev. He also served as Minister and Deputy Ambassador of Kazakhstan to Germany. He has received academic grants from the United States Congress and the Soros Foundation.

Dosmukhamedov published a book on foreign direct investment in the transitional economies [by Palgrave/Macmillan publishers] which was awarded a Paul Frankel Prize by the British Institute of Petroleum and "ATAMEKEN - Building Democracy in Kazakhstan".

Dosmukhamedov participated in a sting operation led by The Times which caught U.S. lobbyist Stephen Payne offering access to top U.S. officials in exchange for a private donation to the George W. Bush Presidential Library. Payne would sometimes refer to Dosmukhamedov as "Eric Dos".
