= Valery Gelashvili =

Georgian politician

- ვალერი გელაშვილი

CEO V & G
- In office 2006–2012

Personal details
- Born: 18 January 1960 (age 66) Khashuri, Georgia, Soviet Union
- Party: Georgian Dream
- Education: Institute of Physical Culture (1977-1981)

Valery Gelashvili (Georgian: ვალერი გელაშვილი; born on 18 January 1960) is a Georgian politician and businessman. He was the Member of Parliament of Georgia 1999–2003, 2003–2005, 2012–2016. Gelashvili belonged to the construction company "EVRA", which was built in Avlabari residence in 2005, but disputes between the company and the state and the construction was transferred to another company.

== Early life and career ==
Valery Gelashvili was born on January 18, 1960, in the village of Khanshuri, located in what was then the Georgian SSR. He graduated from High School No. 3 of the Transcaucasian Railway in 1976 and later studied at the Institute of Physical Culture in Georgia from 1977 to 1981. After completing his studies, he worked as a teacher of physical culture from 1981 to 1991. Following the dissolution of the Georgian SSR in 1989, Gelashvili became the director general of the closed joint venture V & G from 1991 to 1999. He entered politics in 1999 as a majoritarian member of the Parliament of Georgia, representing the Khashuri District until 2003. In 2004, Gelashvili was requested by authorities to hand over his apartment building to the state after the government decided to transform the nearby Road Traffic Police building into the new presidential residence. Gelashvili agreed but requested the construction works of the new presidential residence to be carried out by his construction firm Evra. Gelashvili alleged in the interview that the government had not paid the firm for construction.

== 2005 beating ==
His political career faced turmoil in 2005 when he faced a politically motivated assault by unknown people. Gelashvili suffered brain trauma, numerous fractures of facial bones, lacerations in the nose and forehead, and fractures. The incident occurred after daily newspaper Rezonansi published an interview with Gelashvili, in which he talked about a conflict between him and Saakashvili over the former's house and made comments about the personal life of former president Mikheli Saakashvili. Gelashvili later blamed authorities and Saakashvili for ordering his attack. Former Defense Minister Irakli Okruashvili implicated the former president as well as ex-Minister of Internal Affairs Vano Merabishvili in the attack. Okruashvili stated:

“Saakashvili asked me to carry out retribution against Gelashvili. All had to be done so that the motive wasn’t revealed. I refused, and when [Gelashvili was beaten] I spoke with Saakashvili and understood that his order was carried out by Vano Merabishvili."

== Later life ==
From 2006 to 2012, Gelashvili returned to his role at V & G, and he also served as the director of "Evra" LLC between 2011 and 2012. He joined the Georgian Dream party in 2012 and was the sole shareholder of the construction company Lit Geo Invest. He served as a member of the Parliament of Georgia until 2016. From February 18 to December 11, 2020, he was a deputy in the 9th convocation of the Parliament, representing the electoral bloc "Georgian Dream — Democratic Georgia." In 2021, he withdrew from his mayoral campaign in Khashuri Municipality on behalf of Georgian Dream.
