= Committee for the Liberation of Iraq =

American non-governmental organization

Committee for the Liberation of Iraq (CLI)
- Formation: November 2002
- Dissolved: 2003
- Type: Lobby
- Purpose: Promote the replacing of Saddam Hussein's regime with a democratic government
- Chairman of the Board: Bruce P. Jackson
- Executive Director: Randy Scheunemann
- Treasurer: Julie Finley
- Secretary: Gary Schmitt
- Key people: George Shultz (Chairman Advisory Board); John McCain (Honorary Co-Chairmen Advisory Board); Joseph Lieberman (Honorary Co-Chairmen Advisory Board)
- Website: web.archive.org/web/20030803155500/http://www.liberationiraq.org/ (archived 2003)

The Committee for the Liberation of Iraq (CLI) was a non-governmental organization which described itself as a "distinguished group of Americans" who wanted to "free Iraq from Saddam Hussein".

== History ==
The organization was founded in 2002. In a news release announcing its formation, the group said its goal was to "promote regional peace, political freedom and international security through replacement of the Saddam Hussein regime with a democratic government that respects the rights of the Iraqi people and ceases to threaten the community of nations." It had close links to the Project for the New American Century (PNAC) and the American Enterprise Institute (AEI), important shapers of the Bush administration's foreign policy.

The Washington Post reported in November 2002 that "the organization is modeled on a successful lobbying campaign to expand the NATO alliance. Members include former secretary of state George P. Shultz, Sen. John McCain (R-Ariz.) and former senator Bob Kerrey (D-Neb.). ... While the Iraq committee is an independent entity, committee officers said they expect to work closely with the administration. They already have met with Hadley and Bush political adviser Karl Rove. Committee officers and a White House spokesman said Rice, Hadley and Cheney will soon meet with the group."

With the successful removal of Saddam Hussein, the committee appears to have disbanded, and its once-prominent website no longer exists. However, its offices still remain on Pennsylvania Avenue and 10th Street.

== Personnel ==
- Randy Scheunemann, CLI's executive director, former chief national-security adviser to U.S. Senator Trent Lott, has also worked for Donald Rumsfeld as a consultant on Iraq policy. While working for Lott in 1998, Scheunemann drafted the "Iraq Liberation Act" that authorized $98 million for the Iraqi National Congress.
- Bayh, Evan (February 2003). "CLI Welcomes Sen. Bayh; Adds to Bipartisan Consensus". U.S. Newswire. Archived from the original on October 10, 2008 – via FindArticles.
- Bruce P. Jackson, chairman, is the former vice president of weapons contractor Lockheed Martin. He also chaired the Republican Party Platform's subcommittee for National Security and Foreign Policy when George W. Bush ran for president in 2000.
- Jonathan Pallant, Exeter University

=== Advisory board ===
- Mahdi Al-Bassam, Iraq Liberation Action Committee
- Barry Blechman, DFI International, Co-founder of the Henry L. Stimson Center
- Eliot Cohen, Johns Hopkins School of Advanced International Studies
- Thomas A. Dine, Radio Free Europe/Radio Liberty, former Director of the American Israel Public Affairs Committee pro-Israel lobbying group
- General Wayne Downing, U.S. Army (retired), has been a lobbyist for the Iraqi National Congress
- Rend al-Rahim Francke, Iraq Foundation
- Newt Gingrich, former Speaker of the U.S. House of Representatives
- Lt. General Buster Glosson, U.S. Air Force (retired)
- James P. Hoffa, International Brotherhood of Teamsters
- Howell Jackson, Professor of Law, Harvard Law School
- Robert Kerrey, former U.S. presidential candidate
- Jeane J. Kirkpatrick, American Enterprise Institute
- William Kristol, The Weekly Standard, chairman of the Project for the New American Century
- Bernard Lewis, Princeton University
- Joseph Lieberman, U.S. senator (honorary co-chair)
- General Barry McCaffrey, U.S. Army (retired); former U.S. "drug czar"
- John McCain, U.S. senator (honorary co-chair)
- Will Marshall, Progressive Policy Institute
- Richard Perle, former Assistant Secretary of Defense, co-founder of the Project for the New American Century
- Danielle Pletka, American Enterprise Institute
- Gary Schmitt, executive director of the Project for the New American Century
- George P. Shultz, Secretary of State under Ronald Reagan
- Richard Shultz, The Fletcher School of Law and Diplomacy
- Steve Solarz, former congressman
- Ruth Wedgwood, Johns Hopkins School of Advanced International Studies
- Leon Wieseltier, The New Republic
- Chris Williams, Johnston and Associates
- R. James Woolsey, former CIA Director

=== International advisory board ===
- Carl Bildt, former Prime Minister of Sweden
