= Leopolis Hotel =

Hotel in Lviv, Ukraine

Coordinates: 49.8°N 24°E

- Готель Леополіс
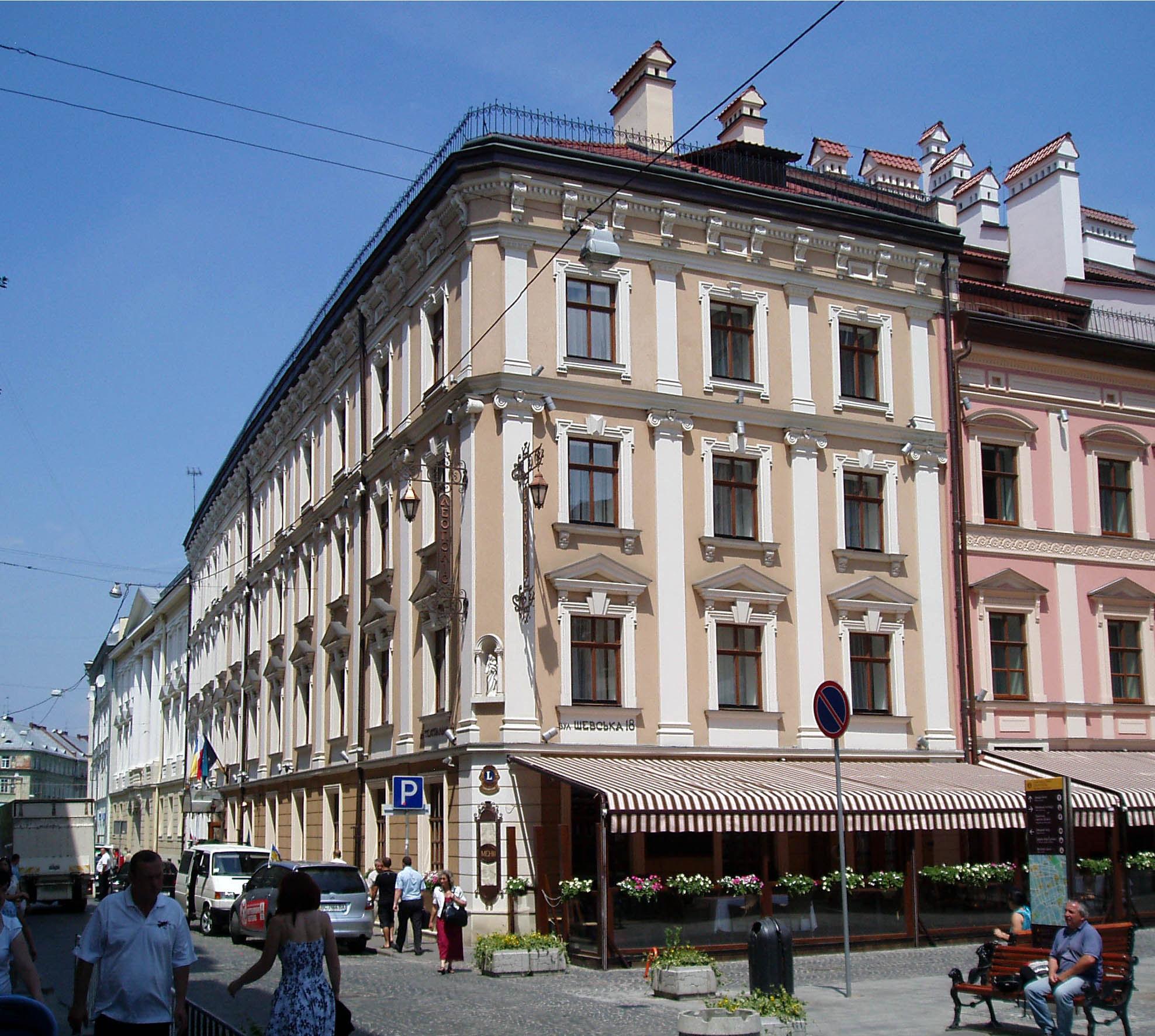
- Interactive map of the Leopolis Hotel area

General information
- Location: 16 Teatralna Street, Lviv, Ukraine
- Opened: 7 September 2007

Other information
- Number of rooms: 72

Website
- http://www.leopolishotel.com

Leopolis Hotel is a hotel in Lviv, Ukraine opened in 2007. By 2011, it had twice been selected in the World Travel Awards as the best hotel in Ukraine.

It was initially opened occupying just one building and featuring 43 rooms and suites. It was subsequently expanded by incorporating two neighboring buildings and increasing its room count to 72.
