= Georgian nationality law =

Georgian Citizenship Act

Parliament of Georgia
- Long title: Organic Law of Georgia on Georgian Citizenship
- Citation: 2319-IIს
- Enacted by: Parliament of Georgia
- Signed by: Giorgi Margvelashvili, President of Georgia
- Signed: April 20, 2014

Legislative history
- Introduced by: Government of Georgia
- Introduced: January 16, 2014
- Committee responsible: Legal Issues
- First reading: April 02-04, 2014
- Voting summary: 81 voted for
- Second reading: April 16, 2014
- Voting summary: 87 voted for; 2 voted against
- Third reading: April 30, 2014
- Voting summary: 83 voted for; None voted against

Repeals
- Organic Law of Georgia on Georgian Citizenship of 25 March 1993

Amended by
- 8 amendments were made
- Status: Current legislation

Georgian nationality law, officially Organic Law of Georgia on Georgian Citizenship (Georgian: საქართველოს ორგანული კანონი საქართველოს მოქალაქეობის შესახებ) is the organic law governing the acquisition, transmission and loss of Georgian citizenship.

== Naturalization as a Georgian ==
Anyone who has stayed in Georgia for a total period of ten years may apply for Georgian nationality. The applicant will be asked to undergo a language proficiency test which will also test the applicant's general knowledge of the history and the heritage of Georgia.

Foreign citizens may obtain Georgian citizenship after marrying a Georgian citizen for five years. While applying for citizenship, the non-Georgian spouse should have a marriage anniversary certificate. Having a child with the Georgian spouse would strengthen their case for naturalization.

== Temporary Residence permit ==
Anyone who enters the Georgian state with a valid passport (or ID card for EU/Swiss/Turkish or Ukrainian citizens) and visa (where required) may ask for a temporary residence permit which may be extended up to a period of 6 years. The decision of giving the residence permit is totally up to the municipal government of the area in which the applicant resides. Generally people who come for medical treatment or business are warmly welcomed.

== Permanent residence permit ==
Anyone who has stayed a period of 6 years in Georgia with a temporary residence permit may apply for a permanent residence permit.

== Visas and Residence permit ==
Foreign staff of diplomatic missions and consular posts, as well as similar representations accredited to Georgia need visas for their first entry to the territory of Georgia. During their accreditation period they stay in the country and cross the border on the basis of an accreditation card issued according to the determined rule of the Ministry of Foreign Affairs of Georgia, if other is not provided by international obligation.

In cases determined by the Georgian legislation a visa/entry permit for up 90 days (visa fee 50 GEL) or for 360 days (visa fee 100 GEL) can be issued by the Patrol Police of Georgia (sub-divisional institution of the Ministry of Internal Affairs) at border crossing points situated at the Georgian State Border.

The basis for the stay of an alien in Georgia is a visa or residence permit (permanent or temporary) if other is not provided by this law and international treaties of Georgia.

== Visa requirements for entering the Georgian territory ==
The citizens of, and foreign nationals who permanently reside in, Bulgaria, the Czech Republic, Denmark, Estonia, Germany, Hungary, Ireland, Japan, Latvia, Lithuania, Mexico, Norway, Poland, Romania, Saudi Arabia, Slovakia, Slovenia, South Korea, Spain, Sweden, Switzerland and the United States, who possess a document certifying permanent residence in one of these countries, do not need a visa to enter and stay in the territory of Georgia up to 360 days.

Foreign nationals, who have temporary residence document and reside in the territory of Bahrain, Kuwait, Oman, and Qatar do not need a visa to enter and stay in the territory of Georgia up to 360 days. Citizens of Russia and foreign nationals residing in Saudi Arabia having valid resident permit do not need a visa to enter and stay in the territory of Georgia up to 90 days.

Citizens of other members states of the European Union, Switzerland, Turkey and Ukraine can enter Georgia with a national ID card.

Foreign nationals who are holders of the United Nations', or its specialized agencies', travel documents (Laissez-Passer), can enter or stay in the territory of Georgia without a visa up to 90 days.

== Special Nationality ==
An application for naturalization may be presented to the president of Georgia. The President has the right to grant Georgian nationality to anyone, including making a person a dual national, if they find that person important to the national interest of the state of Georgia. Those who receive Georgian citizenship in this manner, by decree of the president of Georgia, may keep their foreign nationality and become dual nationals of their other country and of Georgia. This way of granting Georgian nationality also became a way for the President to enable ethnic Georgians who left Georgia during the Soviet era, and their descendants who had been born out of Georgia, to reunite with their ancestral homeland. This is considered a national goal and in the state interest.

Keeping in consideration that granting the nationality to a particular person is beneficial for Georgia, such special nationality is granted without the need of fulfilling the 'residence and language' requirements.

== Travel freedom ==
Visa requirements for Georgian citizens

As of October 1, 2019, Georgian citizens had visa-free or visa on arrival access to 114 countries and territories, ranking the Georgian passport 50th in terms of travel freedom according to the Henley Passport Index.
