= We Remember Foundation =

Anti corruption NGO in Belarus

We Remember/Мы памятаем/Мы помним/
- Formation: 2004
- Founder: Iryna Krasoŭskaja, Śviatłana Zavadskaja
- Type: Non-profit
- Tax ID no.: 55-0870622
- Purpose: To educate the public about human rights crimes and abuses in Belarus and the need for international cooperation and support to create and maintain a civil society in Belarus.
- Official language: Russian and English
- President: Iryna Krasoŭskaja
- Website: www.ciwr.org

The We Remember Foundation (Belarusian: Ініцыятыва „Мы памятаем”, romanized: Initsyyatyva "My pamyatayem", Russian: инициатива «Мы помним», romanized: initsiativa "My pomnim") is a non-profit organisation established in 2004 with the mission of bringing officials of the Government of Belarus to justice for the disappearances and murders of political opposition leaders and journalists. It has since expanded to educate the public about human rights crimes and abuses in Belarus.
