= Giorgi Ivanishvili =

Georgian footballer

Personal information
- Date of birth: 18 October 1989 (age 37)
- Place of birth: Tbilisi, Georgia
- Height: 1.86 m (6 ft 1 in)
- Position: Winger

Youth career
- 2007–2009: Zürich

Senior career*
Years	Team	Apps	(Gls)
2009–2012	Zürich	0	(0)
2009–2010	→ Wohlen (loan)	28	(4)
2010–2011	→ Schaffhausen (loan)	28	(1)
2011–2012	→ AC Bellinzona (loan)	17	(3)
2012–2013	AC Bellinzona	19	(1)
2014–2016	Tskhinvali	53	(11)
2016–2017	Chikhura Sachkhere	38	(6)
2018–2019	Dinamo Tbilisi	26	(3)
2019	Zagłębie Sosnowiec	9	(0)
2019	Sioni Bolnisi	15	(1)
2020	Torpedo Kutaisi	14	(1)

International career
2007–2008	Georgia U19	3	(0)
2009–2010	Georgia U21	11	(2)
- * Club domestic league appearances and goals

Giorgi Ivanishvili (born 18 October 1989) is a Georgian former professional footballer who played as a winger.

He has played for AC Bellinzona in Switzerland. He was also an international player for the Georgia national under-21 football team.

== Career ==
=== Club career ===
Ahead of the 2019–20 season, Ivanishvili joined FC Sioni Bolnisi. He then moved to FC Torpedo Kutaisi in February 2020.

== Family ==
He is the son of Tamar Bagrationi, who is the current first lady of Georgia as the wife of his stepdad Mikheil Kavelashvili, the disputed president of Georgia. Through her mother, Ivanishvili belongs to a noble line of Bagration-Davitishvili.

== Honours ==
Chikhura Sachkere

- Georgian Cup: 2017
