= 2011 Georgian protests =

2011 protests in Georgia against the government of Mikheil Saakashvili

- Date: 21–26 May 2011
- Location: Georgia
- Goals: Resignation of President Mikheil Saakashvili, political reforms
- Methods: Demonstrations, civil disobedience
- Result: Protests suppressed by Georgian authorities, Badri Bitsadze arrested and charged for orchestrating the protests.

Parties
(Georgia (country)) People's Assembly; National Forum; Democratic Movement	Government of Georgia; Ministry of Internal Affairs; Police of Georgia; Constitutional Security Department; National Security Council

Lead figures
Nino Burjanadze; Badri Bitsadze; Nona Gaprindashvili	Mikheil Saakashvili; Vano Merabishvili; Data Akhalaia; Vasil Leluashvili

Number
10,000	

Casualties
- Deaths: 4 Killed Or Injured
- Arrested: 1 Arrested Badri Bitsadze

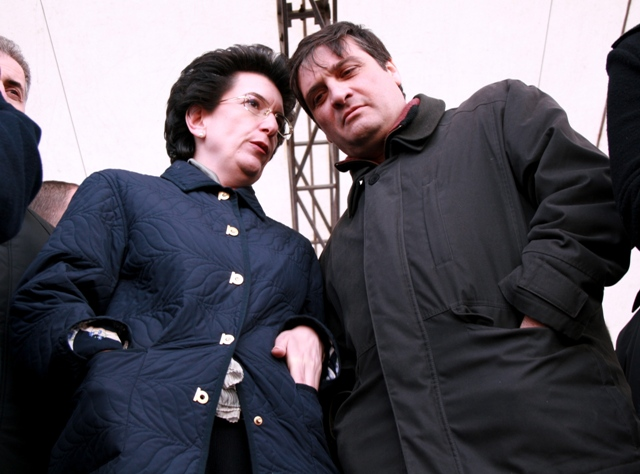

The 2011 Georgian protests were a series of anti-government protests in Georgia against President Mikheil Saakashvili.

== Events ==
Poster announcing the protests on 21 May 2011 with the slogan "Misha will go!"

The protests began on 21 May 2011 when over 10,000 Georgians attended a demonstration in Tbilisi demanding Georgian President Mikheil Saakashvili's resignation. In the southwestern city of Batumi some demonstrations also occurred with some protesters attempting to break into television building. Nino Burjanadze, an ex-parliamentary speaker and leader of the Democratic Movement-United Georgia party, has been a lead figure in the demonstrations. The protesters in Batumi briefly clashed with police.

On 26 May at about 00:15, Georgian police began to suppress the protests with tear gas and rubber bullets, and the protests soon ended.

On 28 May, a separate demonstration was held with thousands of participants, protesting against violence both by the protesters and by the police.

== Arrests ==
In early June, Georgian authorities arrested and charged Badri Bitsadze, husband of former parliament speaker Nino Burdzhanadze, with attempting to orchestrate the government takeover using paramilitary groups during the violent anti-government protests. There have been 105 other arrests of protesters.

== Reactions ==
Mikheil Saakashvilli alleged that the protestors were backed by Russia and had provoked the violence. Likewise John R. Bass, the American ambassador to Georgia, stated that "here were clearly a number of people included in that protest who were not interested in peacefully protesting, but were looking to spark a violent confrontation." The Georgian Interior Ministry released video recordings that it claims show opposition members discussing how to instigate clashes with police The Economist, meanwhile, spoke of an attempt by Burjanadze to "claw her way back to power".

Irakli Alasania (an opposition leader who disassociated himself from the protests early on) opined that the protests were doomed to failure because:

The era when politicians can just call people on the streets is over. Georgia is building a new political culture. People want to determine Georgia’s future through elections.

== Investigation ==
After the change of power in Georgia in 2012, the new government opened investigation into dispersal of the 2011 protests. On February 27, 2014, former Interior Minister Vano Merabishvili was found guilty by the Tbilisi City Court of exceeding official powers during the protests by ordering break up of rally in Tbilisi with the use of excessive force. He was sentenced to six years in prison, which was reduced to 4 years and 6 months due to amnesty. On September 20, 2016, the Prosecutor's Office of Georgia charged four former Constitutional Security Department officials for their handling of the protests.

== See also ==
- Rose Revolution
- 2007 Georgian demonstrations
- 2009 Georgian demonstrations
- 2012 Georgian protests
- List of protests in the 21st century
