= 2013 Georgian presidential election =

- 27 October 2013
- Turnout: 46.95% (▼9.24pp)
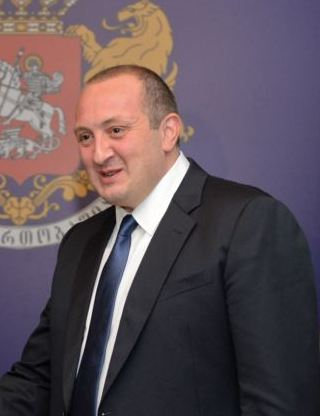

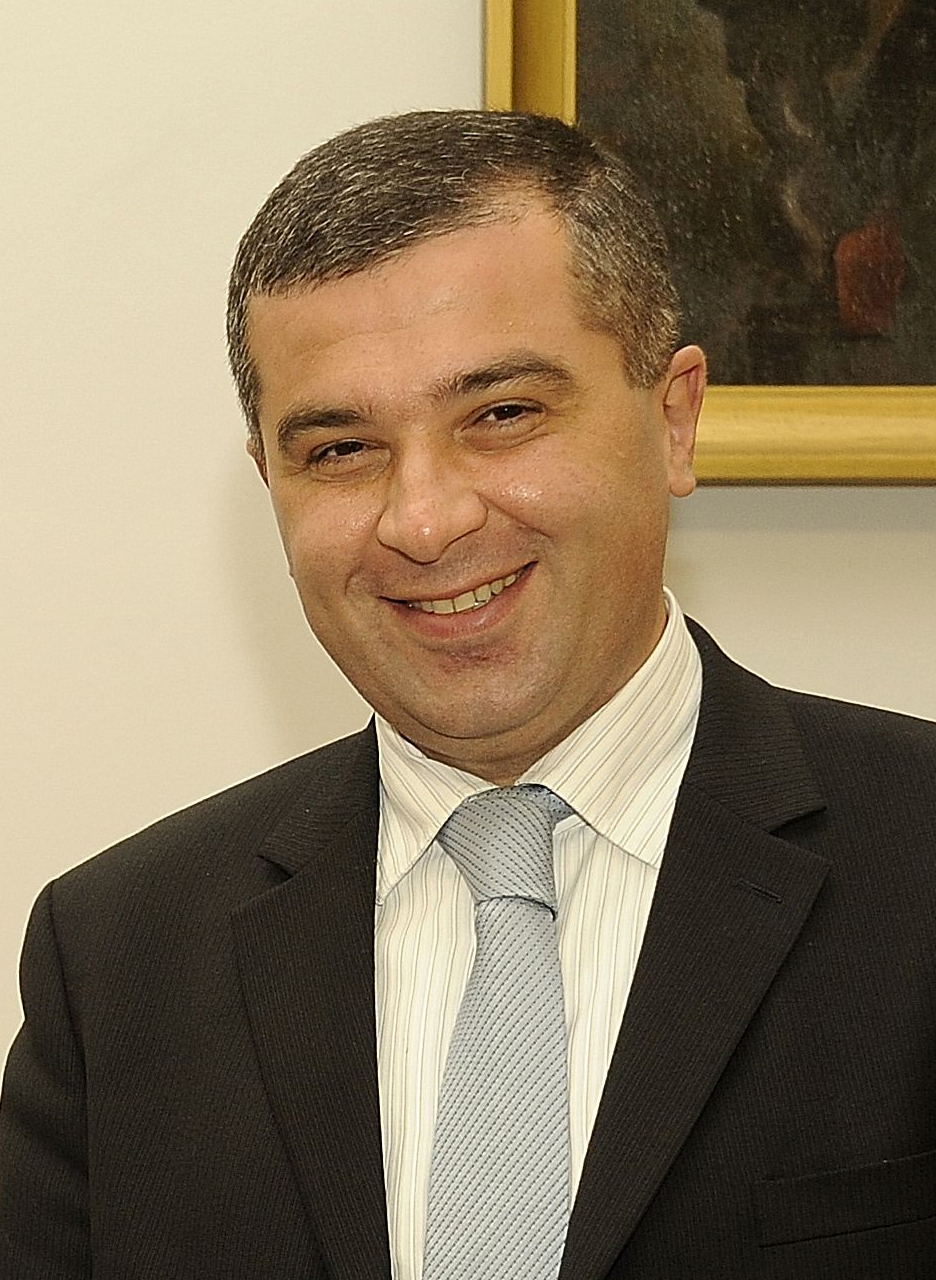

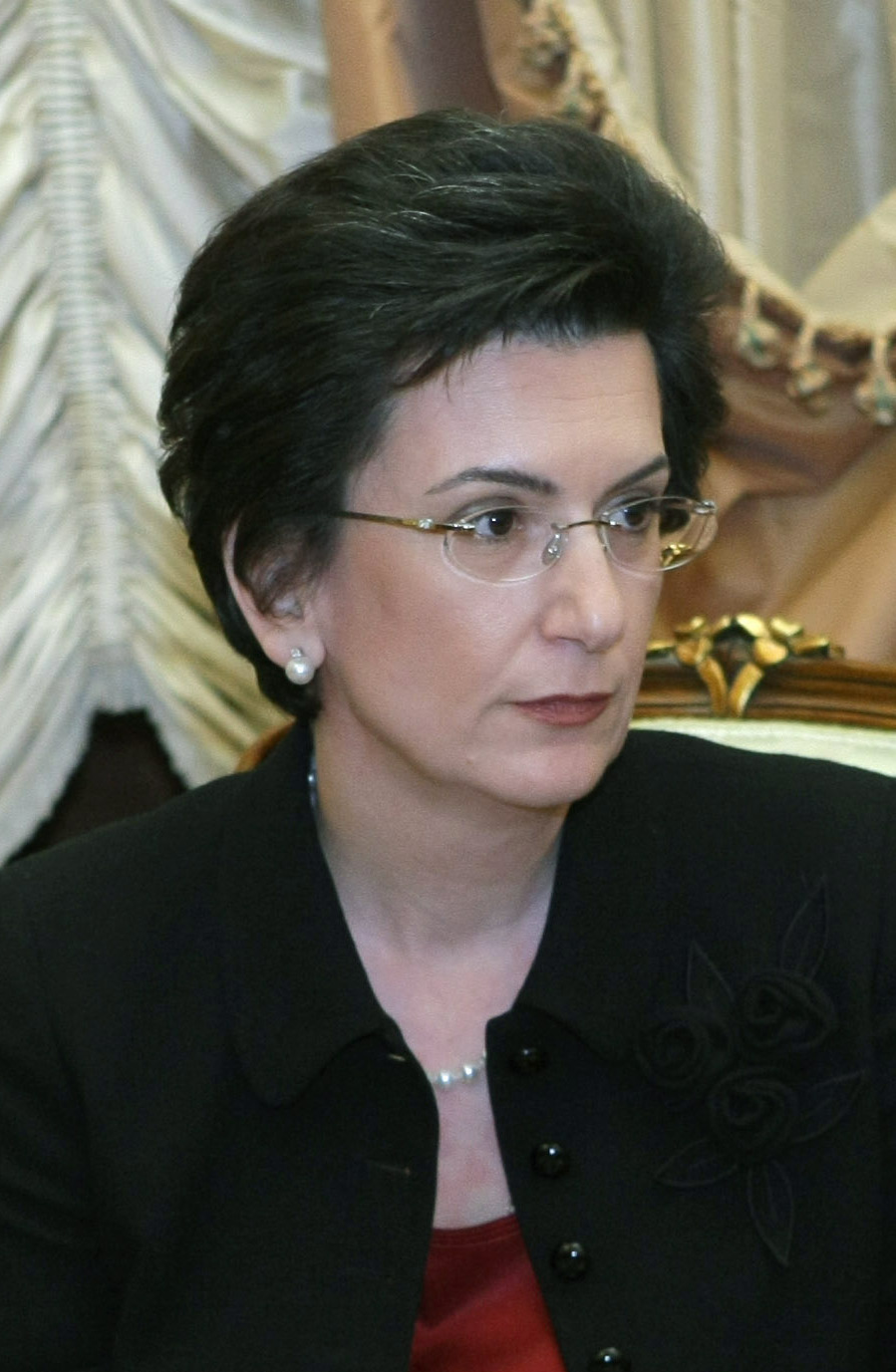
Nominee	Giorgi Margvelashvili	David Bakradze	Nino Burjanadze
Party	Georgian Dream	UNM	DM–UG
Popular vote	1,012,569	354,103	166,061
Percentage	62.12%	21.72%	10.19%
- Results by district Margvelashvili: 40–50% 50–60% 60–70% 70–80% 90%+
President before election
Mikheil Saakashvili
UNM
Elected President
Giorgi Margvelashvili
Georgian Dream

Presidential elections were held in Georgia on 27 October 2013, the sixth presidential elections since the country's restoration of independence from the Soviet Union in 1991. The last elections in January 2008 resulted in the re-election of Mikheil Saakashvili for his second and final presidential term. Saakashvili was constitutionally barred from running for a third consecutive term.

The elections were held under a two-round system. Giorgi Margvelashvili was elected with a majority of votes in the first round.

== Background ==
The previous presidential elections were held on 5 January 2008 in a polarised political environment following the November 2007 crisis, in response to which President Mikheil Saakashvili, then serving his first term in office, brought forward the elections from the original date in autumn 2008. Saakashvili won the election with 53.47% of the votes in an election described in the Organization for Security and Co-operation in Europe (OSCE) election observation mission report as "the first genuinely competitive post-independence presidential election", which "was in essence consistent with most OSCE and Council of Europe commitments and standards for democratic elections". At the same time, the mission "revealed significant challenges which need to be addressed urgently."

In the October 2012 parliamentary elections, the former ruling party United National Movement (ENM) lost power to the Georgian Dream coalition led by Bidzina Ivanishvili, who became the new Prime Minister.

Upon the inauguration of a new president in 2013, a series of constitutional amendments passed in the Parliament of Georgia from 2010 to 2013 would enter into force. The amendments envisaged significant reduction of the president's powers in favour of the Prime Minister.

== Candidates ==
The Georgian Dream coalition named Giorgi Margvelashvili, then minister of education and science and deputy prime minister, as their presidential candidate on 11 May.

The candidates for the ENM presidential primaries, announced in June 2013, were former parliamentary speaker David Bakradze, veteran lawmaker and former cabinet minister Giorgi Baramidze, Shota Malashkhia and Zurab Japaridze. All the primaries were won by Bakradze, who was announced to be the presidential candidate.

On 12 June, Nino Burjanadze announced that she would run for president as the nominee of Democratic Movement – United Georgia.

Salome Zourabichvili, former Foreign Minister of Georgia, was denied ballot access due to her dual citizenship.

In total, 23 candidates contested the election.

== Opinion polls ==
Opinion polls in the run-up to the election showed Margvelashvili to be the frontrunner. Polls varied between showing over 50% support for Margvelashvili and figures indicating the election would go to a second round.

== Results ==
The result of the election was a clear first-round majority for Margvelashvili with 62% of the vote. Bakradze, his nearest rival, polled 22%. Burjanadze came third, with 10% of the vote. No other candidate received more than 3% of the vote. The inauguration of Margvelashvili was on 17 November.

The election saw 47% of eligible voters cast a ballot; this is lower than the 2012 parliamentary election, which saw 61% vote, and the 2008 presidential election, where 54% of voters participated.

Candidate	Party	Votes	%
Giorgi Margvelashvili	Georgian Dream–Democratic Georgia	1,012,569	62.12
Davit Bakradze	United National Movement	354,103	21.72
Nino Burjanadze	Democratic Movement – United Georgia	166,061	10.19
Shalva Natelashvili	Georgian Labour Party	46,984	2.88
Giorgi Targamadze	Christian-Democratic Movement	17,354	1.06
Koba Davitashvili	People's Party	9,838	0.60
Zurab Kharatishvili	European Democrats	3,718	0.23
Levan Chachua	Initiative group	3,093	0.19
Nino Chanishvili	Initiative group	2,276	0.14
Sergo Javakhidze	Movement for a Fair Georgia	2,107	0.13
Giorgi Liluashvili	Initiative group	1,909	0.12
Akaki Asatiani	Union of Georgian Traditionalists	1,559	0.10
Mikheil Saluashvili	Initiative group	1,376	0.08
Teimuraz Mzhavia	Christian Democratic People's Party	1,285	0.08
Mamuka Melikishvili	Initiative group	995	0.06
Giorgi Chikhladze	Initiative group	820	0.05
Nestan Kirtadze	Initiative group	762	0.05
Tamaz Bibiluri	Initiative group	687	0.04
Nugzar Avaliani	Initiative group	664	0.04
Avtandil Margiani	Initiative group	627	0.04
Kartlos Gharibashvili	Initiative group	530	0.03
Teimuraz Bobokhidze	Initiative group	356	0.02
Mamuka Chokhonelidze	Initiative group	315	0.02
Total		1,629,988	100.00
Valid votes		1,629,988	98.13
Invalid/blank votes		30,988	1.87
Total votes		1,660,976	100.00
Registered voters/turnout		3,537,719	46.95
Source: CEC

=== By district or municipality ===
District/Municipality	Turnout	Margvelashvili	Bakradze	Burjanadze	Natelashvili	Targamadze	Others	Lead
Mtatsminda	57.12	63.62	21.02	9.48	2.62	0.61	2.65	42.60
Vake	56.17	65.54	19.45	9.49	2.32	0.69	2.51	46.09
Saburtalo	52.97	65.87	18.17	10.03	2.91	0.62	2.40	47.70
Krtsanisi	42.23	59.84	22.96	10.47	3.24	0.84	2.65	36.88
Isani	41.73	59.43	22.78	10.88	3.74	0.92	2.25	36.65
Samgori	44.54	61.92	20.51	9.55	4.36	1.31	2.35	41.41
Chughureti	47.88	61.96	21.13	9.96	3.20	0.83	2.92	40.83
Didube	54.40	64.06	19.55	10.10	2.99	0.72	2.58	44.51
Nadzaladevi	46.42	64.00	18.83	9.61	4.26	0.99	2.31	45.17
Gldani	45.00	61.47	20.78	9.65	4.68	1.03	2.39	40.69
Sagarejo	38.53	66.29	17.39	10.04	3.23	1.36	1.69	48.90
Gurjaani	51.08	59.29	24.09	9.06	4.15	1.44	1.97	35.20
Sighnaghi	54.60	68.54	16.60	9.53	2.88	1.06	1.39	51.94
Dedoplistskaro	53.41	79.39	11.74	4.60	2.27	0.83	1.17	67.65
Lagodekhi	45.83	61.81	23.12	10.37	1.92	1.01	1.77	38.69
Kvareli	51.22	56.77	25.04	12.08	3.65	0.90	1.56	31.73
Telavi	43.12	50.35	26.53	14.29	5.17	1.91	1.75	23.82
Akhmeta	46.27	61.07	21.37	11.24	4.22	0.87	1.23	39.70
Tianeti	56.09	68.76	8.78	15.52	5.06	0.45	1.43	53.24
Rustavi	43.00	56.80	25.63	8.68	5.12	1.41	2.36	31.17
Gardabani	35.26	64.94	20.78	8.86	2.69	0.76	1.97	44.16
Marneuli	32.60	63.95	25.92	7.85	0.36	0.34	1.58	38.03
Bolnisi	36.92	64.34	21.62	9.87	0.97	0.98	2.22	42.72
Dmanisi	45.59	47.29	41.53	7.40	1.22	0.56	2.00	5.76
Tsalka	29.32	64.17	13.86	17.57	0.99	0.96	2.45	46.60
Tetritskaro	44.73	61.89	21.15	10.36	2.81	1.36	2.43	40.74
Mtskheta	49.95	63.43	17.10	11.31	5.54	1.00	1.62	46.33
Dusheti	49.23	77.77	9.11	5.28	6.45	0.39	1.00	68.66
Kazbegi	40.04	69.03	6.66	19.12	3.55	0.39	1.25	49.91
Kaspi	45.43	67.73	15.54	9.36	4.03	0.89	2.45	52.19
Gori	46.35	61.79	19.18	12.03	3.69	1.54	1.77	42.61
Kareli	47.93	65.54	20.24	8.09	3.40	1.18	1.55	45.30
Khashuri	45.33	65.25	18.20	8.63	4.92	1.19	1.81	47.05
Borjomi	52.33	67.25	13.86	11.76	3.56	1.17	2.40	53.39
Akhaltsikhe	50.87	55.27	29.03	10.19	1.89	1.95	1.67	26.24
Adigeni	59.20	54.33	30.77	10.61	1.50	1.40	1.39	23.56
Aspindza	64.34	57.04	23.72	14.98	1.79	0.73	1.74	33.32
Akhalkalaki	38.28	66.96	19.24	10.66	0.33	0.62	2.19	47.72
Ninotsminda	45.71	70.80	9.75	14.88	0.08	0.85	3.64	55.92
Oni	57.51	59.46	18.19	18.50	1.91	0.71	1.23	40.96
Ambrolauri	63.51	64.73	19.04	12.06	1.85	0.64	1.68	45.69
Tsageri	57.02	56.80	22.37	16.72	1.48	0.49	2.14	34.43
Lentekhi	55.09	72.62	8.21	14.84	1.26	0.68	2.39	57.78
Mestia	54.79	66.90	16.82	10.57	2.06	1.20	2.45	50.08
Kharagauli	63.98	69.03	19.19	7.26	1.15	0.98	2.39	49.84
Terjola	55.52	65.30	22.25	8.29	1.52	0.88	1.76	43.05
Sachkhere	64.70	94.21	2.79	1.89	0.35	0.14	0.62	91.42
Zestaponi	48.21	68.36	19.36	7.58	2.58	0.70	1.42	49.00
Baghdati	48.77	55.11	30.12	9.39	2.81	1.00	1.57	24.99
Vani	51.11	61.17	18.91	15.83	1.40	1.01	1.68	42.26
Samtredia	45.79	62.72	23.96	8.03	1.67	1.68	1.94	38.76
Khoni	60.25	56.74	33.70	6.11	1.32	0.51	1.62	23.04
Chiatura	47.87	77.04	11.08	6.80	1.51	1.03	2.54	65.96
Tkibuli	49.55	57.15	25.62	11.71	2.59	0.83	2.10	31.53
Tskaltubo	46.60	54.95	30.33	9.53	2.63	1.03	1.53	24.62
Kutaisi	39.74	56.38	26.58	10.18	3.65	1.28	1.93	29.80
Ozurgeti	52.03	69.38	16.62	9.14	1.75	1.28	1.83	52.76
Lanchkhuti	55.50	70.38	15.97	7.35	2.03	1.47	2.80	54.41
Chokhatauri	60.20	75.61	12.05	8.28	1.04	0.96	2.06	63.56
Abasha	53.64	59.11	27.57	8.75	1.69	1.36	1.52	31.54
Senaki	44.91	45.80	35.17	11.99	2.82	1.92	2.30	10.63
Martvili	51.03	52.55	34.15	9.67	1.19	1.03	1.41	18.40
Khobi	54.03	58.13	26.24	11.59	1.59	0.95	1.50	31.89
Zugdidi	34.85	46.61	40.81	8.38	1.77	0.90	1.53	5.80
Tsalenjikha	43.15	50.56	34.91	10.92	1.52	0.73	1.36	15.65
Chkhorotsqu	55.86	64.33	25.74	6.89	1.10	0.50	1.44	38.59
Poti	42.45	57.36	23.34	13.03	3.35	1.36	1.56	34.02
Batumi	43.62	58.39	20.27	14.96	2.93	1.24	2.21	38.12
Keda	62.96	58.63	18.90	16.81	1.16	2.04	2.46	39.73
Kobuleti	44.81	60.78	21.05	12.38	2.21	1.79	1.79	39.73
Shuakhevi	58.67	54.34	23.35	16.39	1.35	2.35	2.22	30.99
Khelvachauri	44.51	59.99	16.49	17.27	2.63	1.60	2.02	42.72
Khulo	54.29	55.15	22.11	16.78	1.37	1.86	2.73	33.04
Abroad	N/A	48.58	39.30	4.02	3.60	1.34	3.16	9.28
Source: CEC CEC

== Reactions ==
Margvelashvili was, at the time, an ally of Prime Minister Bidzina Ivanishvili, and the result was considered to be a consolidation of Ivanishvili's power. With his appointee elected to the presidency, Ivanishvili declared his intention to leave his role as Prime Minister, stating that his goals had been achieved.

The election was declared as "clean" and "transparent" by international observers. The OSCE observer mission preliminary report stated that the election was "efficiently administered, transparent and took place in an amicable and constructive environment." However, there were some issues noted by observers. International Society for Fair Elections and Democracy, a Georgian election observer group, found "significant shortcomings" regarding invalid ID and voter lists in Batumi, filing 45 complaints. Another group, Transparency International, filed 34 complaints.

=== International responses ===
Supranational organizations

- European Union — Catherine Ashton, the EU High Representative for Foreign Affairs, and Štefan Füle, the Commissioner for Enlargement and European Neighbourhood Policy, released a statement where they congratulated "the Georgian people on this demonstration of their country's strong democratic credentials" and that they "look forward to continued close cooperation with Georgia on our ambitious mutual agenda of political association and economic integration."

States

- United States — US Department of State release said that they "witnessed another historic day for all Georgians" and an "important step in Georgia's democratic development and its embrace of Euro-Atlantic institutions."
- Russia — Russian Foreign Minister Sergey Lavrov congratulated the Georgian people on the "free and fair election" and expressed his hope that the new government would "adopt a friendly policy toward Russia, one that will take into account the current situation in this complex region."
- Sweden — Foreign Minister Carl Bildt congratulated Georgia on "its well-run presidential election and Giorgi Margvelashvili on clearly being the winner."
