= Nanuli Shevardnadze =

Soviet-Georgian journalist and activist; First Lady of Georgia (1995–2003)

- ნანული შევარდნაძე
- Shevardnadze in 1988

First Lady of Georgia
- In role 25 November 1995 – 23 November 2003
- President: Eduard Shevardnadze
- Preceded by: Manana Archvadze-Gamsakhurdia (1992)
- Succeeded by: Badri Bitsadze

Personal details
- Born: Nanuli Tsagareishvili; 9 March 1930
- Died: 20 October 2004 (aged 74) Tbilisi, Georgia
- Spouse: Eduard Shevardnadze (m. 1951)
- Children: 2
- Relatives: Sophie Shevardnadze (granddaughter)

Nanuli Shevardnadze (Georgian: ნანული შევარდნაძე, née Tsagareishvili, ცაგარეიშვილი; 9 March 1930 – 20 October 2004) was a Soviet and Georgian journalist and activist.

== Biography ==
Nanuli's father Razhden Tsagareishvili was purged during Joseph Stalin's rule, while her mother died of tuberculosis, leaving Nanuli and her two siblings orphaned. In 1951, she married Eduard Shevardnadze, who would become Soviet Foreign Minister (1985–1991) and leader of post-Soviet Georgia (1992–2003). Shevardnadze, then a Komsomol activist, met her in the last years of Stalin's life, ignoring warning that it would be fatal to his career to marry a woman whose father was executed as an "enemy of the people". Even Nanuli initially rejected Shevardnadze's marriage proposal, fearing her background would ruin his career, but he did not back down.

In the 1960s and 1970s, Nanuli Shevardnadze worked as a journalist and specialist in the Russian language, editing a popular women's magazine in Tbilisi. During her husband's tenure as Soviet Foreign Minister in the 1980s, she befriended the wives of many top American officials. In March 1992, she followed Shevardnadze back to her native Georgia, which was suffering from a civil strife. Shevardnadze became an interim head of state, being elected to the post of president in 1995. During these years, Nanuli Shevardnadze took part in many charitable events. She founded and chaired an international movement "Women of Georgia for Peace and Life" and edited the magazine "Peace to All". In the mid-1990s, she campaigned against the adoption of orphaned Georgian children by foreigners, arguing this threatened Georgia's already difficult demographic situation. Eduard Shevardnadze stepped down as president during the bloodless Rose Revolution on 23 November 2003. He later claimed that Nanuli was among those who urged him to resign earlier.

On 20 October 2004, Nanuli Shevardnadze suffered a heart attack and died in a hospital in Tbilisi. Eduard Shevardnadze was at that time in Germany on his first foreign visit since he resigned in 2003. She was survived by her husband, two children—Paata and Manana—and five grandchildren, including the journalist Sophie Shevardnadze.

== Controversy ==
Shevardnadze generated significant controversy during the economic hardship of the 1990s by stating that a "good housewife" could stretch 7 GEL to cover a household's monthly budget. The comment drew widespread backlash from a population facing severe poverty and hyperinflation, who viewed it as deeply out of touch. The phrase endured in Georgian political culture as a classic symbol of political elite detachment.
