= First ladies of Georgia =

First ladies of Georgia may refer to:

- First ladies and gentlemen of Georgia (country)
- First ladies of Georgia (U.S. state)
