= Sandra Roelofs =

First Lady of Georgia from 2004 to 2013

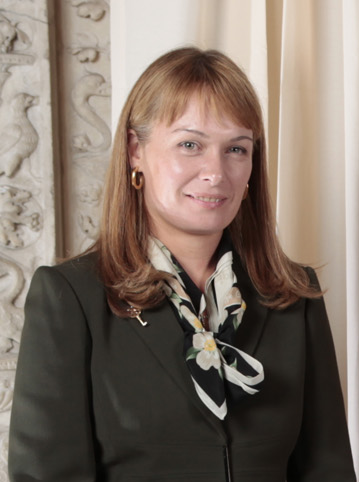
- Roelofs in 2009

First Lady of Georgia
- In role 20 January 2008 – 17 November 2013
- President: Mikheil Saakashvili
- Preceded by: Badri Bitsadze (acting)
- Succeeded by: Maka Chichua
- In role 25 January 2004 – 25 November 2007
- President: Mikheil Saakashvili
- Preceded by: Badri Bitsadze (acting)
- Succeeded by: Badri Bitsadze (acting)

Personal details
- Born: Sandra Elisabeth Roelofs; 23 December 1969 (age 56) Terneuzen, Netherlands
- Party: United National Movement
- Spouse: Mikheil Saakashvili (m. 1994)
- Children: Eduard Saakashvili; Nikoloz Saakashvili

Sandra Elisabeth Roelofs-Saakashvili (also spelled Saakasjvili; (Note: Dutch pronunciation: [ˈsɑndraː ʔeːˈlisaːbɛt ˌrulɔf saːkɑɕˈfili]; Georgian: სანდრა ელისაბედ სააკაშვილი-რულოვსი, romanized: sandra elisabed saak'ashvili-rulovsi, IPA: [ˈsandɾa elisaˈbed saakʼaˈʃʷili ˈrulofsi]; Ukrainian: Сандра Елісабет Рулофс-Саакашвілі, IPA: [ˈsɑndrɐ el⁽ʲ⁾isɐˈbɛt ˈrulofs sɐɐkɐʃˈwil⁽ʲ⁾i].) née Roelofs; born 23 December 1969) is a Dutch-Georgian activist and diplomat who was the First Lady of Georgia from 2004 to 2013, when her husband Mikheil Saakashvili was president of the country.

== Biography ==
Roelofs was born in Terneuzen, Netherlands. In 1991, she graduated in French and German languages from the Erasmushogeschool in Brussels and in 1993 attended courses at the International Institute of Human Rights in Strasbourg. She met Mikheil Saakashvili in 1993 in Strasbourg and later that year moved to New York City where she worked at Columbia University and a Dutch law firm. In 1996, the couple came to Georgia, where Roelofs worked for the International Committee of the Red Cross and the Consulate of the Kingdom of the Netherlands in Tbilisi.

From 1999 to 2003, Roelofs was a visiting lecturer of French language at Tbilisi State University and was a radio correspondent for Dutch radio. Beyond her native Dutch, Roelofs speaks French, English, German, Russian, and Georgian.

Roelofs acquired Georgian citizenship in January 2008 and is a dual Dutch-Georgian citizen.

Roelofs ran as a candidate for the United National Movement in the 2016 Georgian parliamentary election. She ran in the Zugdidi district and was number two on the party list. The United National Movement won 27 (nationwide) party list seats. The initial Zugdidi district vote of 8 October 2016 was nullified in several polling stations and a repeat vote was held there on 22 October 2016 and again Roelofs placed second in the district. Roelofs refused to participate in the Zugdidi district 30 October 2016 second round run-off election claiming the official results were falsified (adding not only in this election district but in the whole country). On 7 November 2016, she also gave up her party list seat and thus did not become an MP in the Georgian parliament.

Roelofs and Saakashvili have two sons, Eduard (b. 1995) and Nikoloz (b. 2006).

A few days before Saakashvili's October 2021 return to Georgia he recorded a video on Facebook with Ukrainian MP Yelyzaveta Yasko in which they disclosed they were having a romantic relationship. A few days later Yasko remarked that Sandra Roelofs was Saakashvili's "ex-wife". There had been no media reports that Saakashvili and Roelofs had divorced. Roelofs had been "caught by surprise" by Yasko's and Saakashvili's video announcement and remarked on Facebook (on 7 October 2021) that "its form was absolutely unacceptable."

Roelofs' autobiographical book The Story of an Idealist (2005) has been translated into Georgian, Russian, Ukrainian, Polish, Turkish, Azerbaijani and English.

== Charity work ==
In 1998, Roelofs founded charity foundation SOCO which has the primary focus of implementing the programs funded by western European and Georgian companies and individuals and is aimed at supporting low income families. Since setting new targets in 2007, SOCO has been actively taking care of reproductive health and child welfare in Georgia. In 2007, Roelofs founded Radio Muza, the first Georgian radio dedicated solely to classical music.

During her period as first lady of Georgia, she was Stop TB Partnership Ambassador as well as a Goodwill Ambassador promoting Millennium Development Goals for WHO Europe. She was serving at the Board of the Global Fund fighting Aids, TB and Malaria from 2012 to 2015.

Roelofs set up breast and cervical cancer screening programs in Georgia, as well as prenatal screening and promoted palliative care and awareness about rare diseases, safety belts and healthy lifestyle.
