= Tamar Bagrationi =

First Lady of Georgia since 2024

- თამარ ბაგრატიონი

First Lady of Georgia
- Incumbent
- In role 29 December 2024
- President: Mikheil Kavelashvili
- Preceded by: Maka Chichua (2018)

Personal details
- Born: May 1971 (age 55)
- Spouse(s): Mikheil Kavelashvili; Bichi Ivanishvili (divorced)
- Children: 4, including Giorgi
- Relatives: Liza Bagrationi (sister)

Tamar Bagrationi (Georgian: თამარ ბაგრატიონი; born May 1971) is a Georgian public figure who has been serving as first lady of Georgia since 2024 as the wife of Mikheil Kavelashvili, the disputed president of Georgia. She belongs to a noble line of Bagration-Davitishvili.

== Life ==
Tamar (Tamara) Bagrationi was born in May 1971. Her sister is singer Liza Bagrationi and she belongs to a junior branch of the Bagrationi royal dynasty.

She became the first lady of Georgia on 29 December 2024 after his husband Mikheil Kavelashvili was sworn in as the new disputed president of Georgia. Although she keeps a low profile, Bagrationi has taken part in and supported cultural and educational events, and has accompanied her husband on diplomatic trips. In her speeches, she often emphasises the importance of family values.

In March 2026 Bagrationi took part in the working session of the "Fostering the Future Together Global Coalition" summit of worldwide first ladies organised by US first lady Melania Trump.

== Personal life ==
She first married Bichi Ivanishvili, with whom she had her son, the footballer Giorgi Ivanishvili, at the age of 18, divorced and later married Mikheil, with whom she had three children.
