= Badri Bitsadze =

Georgian police general

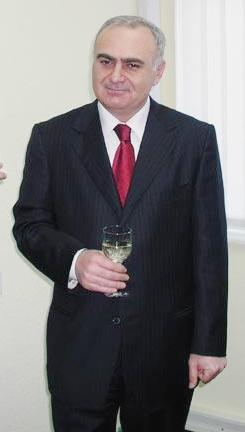

First Gentleman of Georgia Acting
- In role 25 November 2007 – 20 January 2008
- President: Nino Burjanadze
- Preceded by: Sandra Roelofs
- Succeeded by: Sandra Roelofs
- In role 23 November 2003 – 25 January 2004
- President: Nino Burjanadze
- Preceded by: Nanuli Shevardnadze
- Succeeded by: Sandra Roelofs

Chief of the Border Police of Georgia
- In office July 2006 – 29 October 2008
- President: Mikheil Saakashvili; Nino Burjanadze (acting); Mikheil Saakashvili
- Preceded by: position established
- Succeeded by: Zaza Gogava

Personal details
- Born: 27 April 1958 (age 68) Chiatura, Georgian SSR, USSR
- Spouse: Nino Burjanadze
- Education: Tbilisi State University

Badri Bitsadze (Georgian: ბადრი ბიწაძე) (born 27 April 1958) is the former Chief of the Border Police of Georgia. He holds the rank of Lieutenant General, and previously held the posts of Chief Military Prosecutor, Deputy General Prosecutor, and Deputy Minister of Internal Affairs. He is married to the former Chairwoman of the Parliament of Georgia and twofold former interim President of Georgia, Nino Burjanadze.

Bitsadze attended Tbilisi State University, Faculty of Law, and received a Ph.D. from USSR Scientific Institute for Prosecutors. He's a recipient of the III Degree Vakhtang Gorgasali Order award.

Bitsadze resigned his position on 29 October 2008, claiming that a campaign to discredit the agency was underway because his wife, the former parliamentary chairperson, had withdrawn into opposition to the current government.

Later that year, Bitsadze became involved with his wife's newly founded party Democratic Movement–United Georgia. In March 2009, several party activists, including a driver of Badri Bitsadze, were arrested by the Georgian police on arms charges. Burjanadze said after the Interior Ministry's statement that she was ready to cooperate with the investigation, but claimed that evidence put forth by the investigation was not enough and needed further scrutiny.

== Arrest ==
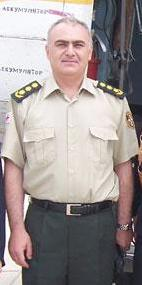
Bitsadze in his police uniform

In early June 2011, Deputy Prosecutor General David Sakvarelidze said he had requested the Tbilisi City Court issue an arrest warrant for Badri Bitsadze, who was accused of organizing attacks on policemen during anti-governmental protests in May 2011 in an alleged "Egyptian scenario" to overthrow the government and did not pay 100,000 Lari for bail. His whereabouts were not clear, however on July 25, Nino Burjanadze gave an interview, where she stated that her husband would seek for political asylum. In July and August 2011, Bitsadze was tried and sentenced to five years and six months in jail in absentia. The investigation of this issue, had been very controversial, due to a shortage of strong evidence.
