= Democratic Movement – United Georgia =

Democratic Movement – United Georgia დემოკრატიული მოძრაობა — ერთიანი საქართველო
- Leader: Nino Burjanadze
- General Secretary: Vakhtang Kolbaia
- Founded: 23 November 2008
- Split from: United National Movement
- Preceded by: Burjanadze-Democrats
- Headquarters: Tbilisi
- Ideology: National conservatism Social market economy Pro-Europeanism; Formerly: Neutralism; Euroscepticism
- Political position: Center-right to right-wing
- Colors: Blue and White
- Seats in Parliament: 0 / 150

Website
- www.democrats.ge

Former logo

Democratic Movement – United Georgia (Georgian: დემოკრატიული მოძრაობა — ერთიანი საქართველო, romanized: demok'rat'iuli modzraoba — ertiani sakartvelo) is a political party in Georgia chaired by Nino Burjanadze; it was founded on 24 November 2008. The secretary-general of the party is Vakhtang Kolbaia.

== History ==
Until 2012, the party was in opposition to the government led by Mikheil Saakashvili and his United National Movement. The party favored closer ties with both Russia and the European Union while maintaining and expanding many of the government's economic and social reform initiatives. It also claimed to seek greater political freedom above and beyond what Saakashvili's administration claimed to provide. It vehemently opposed what it characterized as authoritarianism on the part of Saakashvili's government. The party was one of the main organizers of the 2011 Georgian protests. On May 21, 2011, when over 10,000 people protested against Mikheil Saakashvili's government, party leader Nino Burjanadze, her Husband Badri Bitsadze and other leaders of opposition were main figures.

The government accused the opposition of plotting a coup in the wake of the 2008 South Ossetia war. In turn, the party accused the government of conducting a "campaign of terror" against the opposition.

The party has remained in opposition since the Georgian Dream's victory over the United National Movement in 2012 parliamentary elections. It challenged both Georgian Dream and United National Movement, two largest and most influential parties in Georgia, and briefly established itself as the third force in the Georgian politics.

The party opposed the Georgia's proposed NATO membership and blamed it for Georgia's strained relationship with the Russian Federation. The party proposed to reject Georgia's prospective NATO membership by enshrining "non-bloc status" and military neutrality in the constitution. In exchange for this, the party promised to restore good relations with Russia, reaching an agreement with Moscow on a visa-free regime for Georgians, removing Russian troops from Abkhazia and South Ossetia (disputed Georgian regions under Russian occupation since the 2008 Russo-Georgian War) and opening Russian market for Georgian products. To this end, the party's leader Nino Burjanadze visited the Russian President Vladimir Putin in Moscow several times, the most recently in 2019.

While the party supported enhancing cooperation with the European Union, it considered the Georgia's proposed EU membership only theoretical and long-term objective. Instead, the party argued that Georgia should reorient towards building friendly relations with Russia as its foreign policy priority.

In domestic politics, the party argued for strengthening democratic institutions, replacing military conscription with the contract-based service, imposing progressive tax system, reducing taxes for small businesses, banning foreign ownership of Georgian land, setting term limits for judges, allowing private arbitrate to settle economic disputes, bringing officials from Saakashvili administration to responsibility for "drawing Georgia into the 2008 war with Russia", increasing pension and minimum wage, decriminalizing drug use, banning banks from selling the only residential place without giving a share to incapable family members, introducing six-month unemployment benefits and "mother's salary", curbing immigration, protecting traditional values and fighting against "propaganda of homosexuality and incest".

Running on this platform, the party received around 10% of votes in 2013 presidential election and 2014 local election, ending up on third place in both cases. In 2014 some leaders of Christian-Democratic Movement joined and formed Bloc with Burjanadze's party and Georgian Troupe. The party frequently criticized the Georgian Dream government for perceived failure to improve relations with Russia and accused the Georgian political elite of "playing into America's hands".

Following the brief success, the party's popularity decreased and it eventually faded into obscurity.

Since the 2022 Russian invasion of Ukraine, the party shifted towards Euro-Atlanticism, saying that "today is a completely different reality". Later it signed the Georgian Charter.

== Electoral performance ==
=== Parliamentary election ===
Election	Leader	Votes	%	Seats	+/–	Position	Status
2016	Nino Burjanadze	62,166	3.53	0 / 150	new	5th	Extra-parliamentary
2020	Nino Burjanadze	16,286	0.85	0 / 150	0	10th	Extra-parliamentary

=== Presidential ===
Election year	Candidate	Results	
Election year	Candidate	# of overall votes	% of overall vote
2013	Nino Burjanadze	166,601	10.19 (#3)

=== Local election ===
Election	Votes	%	Seats	+/–
2014	144,691	10.22	148 / 2,088	New
2017	38,898	2.59	11 / 2,058	▼137
2021	845	0.05	0 / 2,068	▼12
