= David Bakradze =

Georgian politician and diplomat

- დავით ბაქრაძე
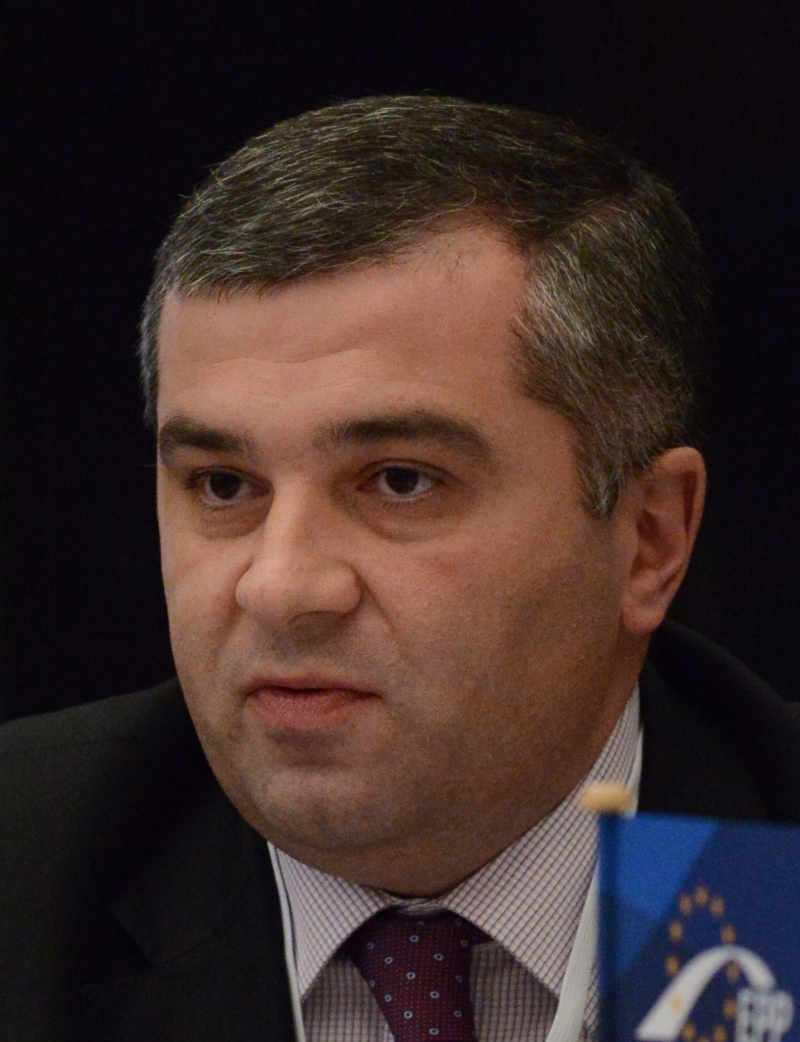
- Bakradze in 2015

Chairman of European Georgia
- In office 27 May 2017 – 10 April 2021
- Preceded by: party established
- Succeeded by: Giga Bokeria

Leader of the Parliamentary Minority
- In office 21 October 2012 – 11 March 2019
- Preceded by: Giorgi Targamadze

4th Speaker of the Parliament
- In office 7 June 2008 – 21 October 2012
- President: Mikheil Saakashvili
- Prime Minister: Lado Gurgenidze; Grigol Mgaloblishvili; Nika Gilauri; Vano Merabishvili
- Preceded by: Nino Burjanadze
- Succeeded by: David Usupashvili

Minister of Foreign Affairs
- In office 31 January 2008 – 5 May 2008
- President: Mikheil Saakashvili
- Preceded by: Gela Bezhuashvili
- Succeeded by: Ekaterine Tkeshelashvili

State Minister for Conflict Resolution issues
- In office July 2007 – 31 January 2008
- President: Mikheil Saakashvili
- Preceded by: Merab Antadze
- Succeeded by: Temur Iakobashvili (as State Minister for Reintegration)

Chairman of the United National Movement
- In office September 2014 – 13 January 2017; De facto (Note: The Chairmanship was officially vacant, as Mikheil Saakashvili was not in the country.)
- Preceded by: Mikheil Saakashvili
- Succeeded by: Mikheil Saakashvili
- In office May 2008 – July 2012
- Preceded by: Nino Burjanadze
- Succeeded by: Vano Merabishvili

Member of the Parliament of Georgia
- In office 7 June 2008 – 25 November 2024
- In office 22 April 2004 – 7 September 2007

Personal details
- Born: 1 July 1972 (age 54) Tbilisi, Georgian SSR, USSR
- Party: European Georgia (2017-2021); United National Movement (2002-2017)
- Education: Tbilisi State University; Georgian Technical University; Georgian Institute of Public Affairs

David Bakradze (Georgian: დავით ბაქრაძე; born 1 July 1972) is a Georgian politician and diplomat who served as the Chairman of the Parliament of Georgia from 7 June 2008 to 21 October 2012.

Bakradze's previous assignments include a member of the Parliament from the United National Movement (April 2004-September 2007), Minister for the Conflict Issues (July 2007-January 2008), Minister of Foreign Affairs (January 2008-April 2008), and the President of Georgia's special envoy to NATO and the European Union (April 2008-June 2008). He is a First Class State Counselor and holds a diplomatic rank of Chief Minister Counselor.

== Early life and education ==
David Bakradze was born in Tbilisi, Georgian SSR. He was educated at Georgian Technical University and the Georgian Institute for Public Affairs (GIPA) as well as gaining a Doctor's degree in Physics and Mathematics from Tbilisi State University. Apart from numerous high-profile government positions Bakradze has been actively involved in various educational programmes attending the Swiss International Relations Institute in Geneva, in 1997, and studying at George Marshall European Centre for Security Studies in Germany in 1998. In 2001 Bakradze graduated from NATO Defence College, Rome, Italy. He has served in the National Guard of Georgia Reserve and is a lieutenant commander.

== Political career ==
Bakradze has been actively involved in Georgian politics since 1997. He worked for the Ministry of Foreign Affairs of Georgia from 1997 to 2002, and for the National Security Council of Georgia from 2002 to 2004. In April 2004, he was elected to the Parliament of Georgia from the United National Movement (UNM) led by the President of Georgia Mikheil Saakashvili. He chaired the Parliamentary Committee for the Euro-Atlantic Integration until 19 July 2007, when he was appointed as a Minister for the Conflict Issues, and hence, a chief negotiator in the Abkhazian and South Ossetian affairs. In January 2008, he became the Foreign Minister of Georgia in the cabinet of the Prime Minister Lado Gurgenidze.

On 21 April 2008 Bakradze was named to lead the UNM party list in the parliamentary election scheduled on 21 May 2008. This decision came after the chairperson of the outgoing parliament, Nino Burjanadze, refused, in a surprise move, to lead the party list due to her disagreement with the UNM leadership.

On 7 June 2008 Bakradze was unanimously elected a chairperson of the Parliament of Georgia at that legislature's inaugural session. In 2012 he was again selected again selected to lead the UNM list for the 1 October parliamentary election, which was won by the Bidzina Ivanishvili-Georgian Dream opposition coalition. Consequently, Bakradze became the leader of the parliamentary minority, being succeeded by David Usupashvili, a Georgian Dream member, as the chairman of the parliament.

In 2013, Bakradze was selected to be the UNM's candidate through internal party election, primaries for the 27 October presidential election. He ended up second in the race and, shortly after the exit poll results were announced, congratulated Georgian Dream's candidate Giorgi Margvelashvili on victory. In the 2018 election, he came in third and received nearly 11 percent of the vote; for the run-off, he announced he would support Grigol Vashadze in the second round.

== Recognition ==
Bakradze was awarded the Commander's Cross Order of Merit of the Republic of Poland by the President of Poland (2010).

== Notes ==
Political offices
Preceded by Gela Bezhuashvili	Minister of Foreign Affairs; 2008	Succeeded by Ekaterine Tkeshelashvili
Preceded by Nino Burjanadze	Speaker of the Parliament; 2008–2012	Succeeded by David Usupashvili
