= First ladies and gentlemen of Georgia (country) =

Presidential spouse or partner

First Lady and First Gentleman of Georgia
- პირველი ქალბატონები და პირველი ბატონები
- Incumbent; Tamar Bagrationi since 29 December 2024
- Inaugural holder: Manana Archvadze-Gamsakhurdia
- Formation: 14 April 1991

First Lady or First Gentlemen of the Republic of Georgia (Georgian: საქართველოს პირველი ქალბატონები, romanized: sakartvelos p'irveli kalbat'onebi) refers to the spouse or partner of the president of Georgia. The position is currently held by Tamar Bagrationi since 2024.

== First ladies and gentlemen of modern Georgia ==
First Lady/Gentleman	Term begins	Term ends	President of Georgia	Notes
Manana Archvadze-Gamsakhurdia	April 14, 1991	January 6, 1992	Zviad Gamsakhurdia	Inaugural first lady of independent Georgia. Gamsakhurdia was deposed in a coup on January 6, 1992
Position vacant	January 6, 1992	November 26, 1995		Presidency abolished during rule by Military Council
Nanuli Shevardnadze	November 25, 1995	November 23, 2003	Eduard Shevardnadze	
Badri Bitsadze	November 23, 2003	January 25, 2004	Nino Burjanadze	
Sandra Roelofs	January 25, 2004	November 25, 2007	Mikheil Saakashvili	
Badri Bitsadze	November 25, 2007	January 20, 2008	Nino Burjanadze	
Sandra Roelofs	January 20, 2008	November 17, 2013	Mikheil Saakashvili	
Position vacant	November 17, 2013	September 10, 2014	Giorgi Margvelashvili	Margvelashvili was not married to his longtime partner, Maka Chichua, when he took office
Maka Chichua	September 10, 2014 (Marriage)	December 16, 2018	Giorgi Margvelashvili	Chichua and Margvelashvili married in Dusheti on September 10, 2014
Position vacant	December 16, 2018	December 29, 2024	Salome Zurabishvili	President Zurabishvili's husband, Georgian journalist Janri Kashia, died in 2012.
Tamar Bagrationi	December 29, 2024	Present	Mikheil Kavelashvili	
