= Mamati =

Mamati მამათი
- Village
- Mamati

- Location in Georgia Mamati (Georgia)
- Coordinates: 42°01′14″N 42°02′00″E
- Country: (Georgia (country)) Georgia
- Region: Guria
- District: Lanchkhuti
- Elevation: 300 m (980 ft)

Population (2014)
  - Total: 254
- Time zone: UTC+4 (Georgian Time)

Mamati (Georgian: მამათი) is a small village in Lanchkhuti Municipality, region Guria, western Georgia with the population of 254 (2014). Since the 2nd President of Georgia Eduard Shevardnadze was born there on 25 January 1928, it has gained prominence.

== See also ==
- Guria
