= Liza Bagrationi =

Georgian singer

- Born: July 21, 1974 (age 51)
- Occupation: Singer

Liza Bagrationi (Georgian: ლიზა ბაგრატიონი) (born 21 July 1974) is a Georgian singer. She descends from the Georgian noble (tavadi) family of Bagration-Davitishvili.

During the 2024–2025 Georgian protests and ensuing torture and violence against protesters, Liza Bagrationi came under criticism for leading the New Year's Eve concert organized by the ruling Georgian Dream party, in spite of widespread opposition boycott. The concert was presented by pro-ruling party media as though it was a live broadcast; however, it was later revealed to be a recording, filmed in strict secrecy four days prior to the announced date without any audience and used pre-recorded applause to create an illusion of there being spectators.

== Family ==
Bagrationi's sister, Tamar, is married to Mikheil Kavelashvili, a Georgian politician and former football player who claims to be President of Georgia following the disputed 2024 Georgian presidential election.
