= Zaza Gogava =

Georgian Major General (born 1971)

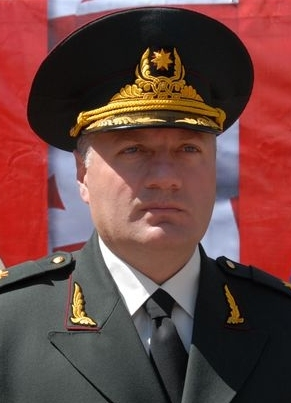
- Brigadier General Zaza Gogava. c. 2008
- Born: July 14, 1971 (age 55)
- Military career
- Allegiance: Georgia
- Branch: Georgian Army; Ministry of Internal Affairs
- Rank: Major general
- Commands: Georgian Special Forces; Georgian Armed Forces; Georgian Border Police
- Conflicts: Russo-Georgian War (2008)

Zaza Gogava (Georgian: ზაზა გოგავა; born July 14, 1971) is a Georgian Major General. He served as a Chief of Joint Staff of the Armed Forces of Georgia from November 2006 to November 2008 and the chief of Border Police from November 2008 to July 2012.

Gogava served his compulsory military service in the Soviet Army motorized rifle units from 1989 to 1990. He was one of the first batch of Georgian conscripts to defect from the Soviet forces. He graduated from the Tbilisi State Technical University in 1994 and began his career in the special task group "Omega" within Georgia's security services in 1995. He has since served in various counter-terrorist units and special forces subdivisions, and was further trained in the United States between 1995 and 2002. Gogava was placed in command of the Counter-terrorism Division of Special Operations Center in 2003 and the élite Police Special Tasks Division named after General G. Gulua in 2004. He was appointed Commander of Georgian Special Operations Forces of the Ministry of Defense of Georgia in 2004 and Deputy Chief of the General Staff of the Armed Forces of Georgia in 2006. After the reshuffle within the Ministry of Defense in November 2006, Gogava became the Chief of Joint Staff of the Armed Forces of Georgia.

Gogava was later appointed as chief of Border Police, replacing Badri Bitsadze, who had earlier announced his resignation. Gogava served in this position until the reshuffle in the Interior Ministry top brass in July 2012.

Military offices
Preceded by Levan Nikoleishvili	Chief of Joint Staff of the Georgian Armed Forces; 2006 – 2008	Succeeded by Vladimer Chachibaia
Police appointments
Preceded by Badri Bitsadze	Chief of the Border Police; 2008 – 2012	Succeeded by Nika Dzimtseishvili
