= Maka Chichua =

First Lady of Georgia from 2014 to 2018

- მაკა ჩიჩუა
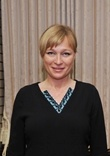
- Chichua in 2014

First Lady of Georgia
- In role 10 September 2014 – 16 December 2018
- President: Giorgi Margvelashvili
- Preceded by: Sandra Roelofs (2013)
- Succeeded by: Tamar Bagrationi (2024)

Personal details
- Born: 31 March 1971 (age 55) Tbilisi, Georgian SSR, Soviet Union
- Spouse: Giorgi Margvelashvili (m. 2014)
- Children: 2

Maka Chichua (Georgian: მაკა ჩიჩუა [mak’a tʃʰitʃʰua]; born 31 March 1971) is a Georgian singer and actress who was First Lady of Georgia between 2014 and 2018. Chichua, the longtime girlfriend of Georgian President Giorgi Margvelashvili, married the president on 10 September 2014, while he was in office, thus becoming the country's first lady.

== Career ==
Chichua is a make-up artist, but has also worked as an actress and singer. Her single, "Electrowaves", was featured on Maestro TV, a Georgian television station. Her film roles have included the 2012 black comedy, Keep Smiling. She also worked for PIK television prior to Margvelashvili's presidency. More recently, Chichua has starred as a judge on Georgia's Got Talent! (Nichieri), the Georgian version of the international Got Talent series, beginning with season 7.

== Personal life ==
Chichua and Margvelashvili were longtime partners for at least four or five years prior to Giorgi Margvelashvili's presidency. However, the couple were not married when Margvelashvili became president in November 2013, leading to speculation on who would serve as the country's new first lady. Nearly a year later, President Margvelashvili and Chichua married on 10 September 2014 in a ceremony held at their home in Dusheti, making her officially First Lady of Georgia. The couple have two sons—Teimuraz (born 2 February 2015) and Toma (born 25 January 2018). Maka Chichua also had one daughter from a previous relationship, as well as a stepdaughter from Margvelashvili's previous marriage.
