= Shota Malashkhia =

Georgian politician

Shota Malashkhia (Georgian: შოთა მალაშხია; born 17 September 1962) is a Georgian politician and the member of the Parliament of Georgia of the 8th convocation from the United National Movement party (UNM). In June 2013, he was named as one of the candidates for the 2013 UNM presidential nomination.

After working as an electrician and a switchman in Tbilisi for years, Malashkhia enrolled into the Tbilisi State Medical Institute in 1983 and graduated from it in 1989. He practiced neurology at various outpatient clinics in Tbilisi before entering politics in 2004, when he was elected to the Parliament of Georgia on the ticket of Mikheil Saakashvili-led United National Movement, which was swept into power following the bloodless change of power in the November 2003 Rose Revolution. He became a chairman of the ad hoc Parliamentary Commission on the Restoration of Territorial Integrity from 2004 to 2008 and frequently voiced the Georgian leadership's position on the issues related to the conflicts in Abkhazia and South Ossetia. He was reelected to the parliament in June 2008 and October 2012. In June 2013, the UNM—then an opposition party–named Malashkhia as one of the four candidates for the party's presidential primaries.
