= Border Police of Georgia =

MIA Border Police of Georgia შსს-ის საქართველოს სასაზღვრო პოლიცია
- Emblem of the Georgian Border Police

- Flag of the Georgian Border Police
- Abbreviation: BPG

Agency overview
- Formed: 1992

Jurisdictional structure
- National agency: Georgia (country)
- Operations jurisdiction: Georgia (country)
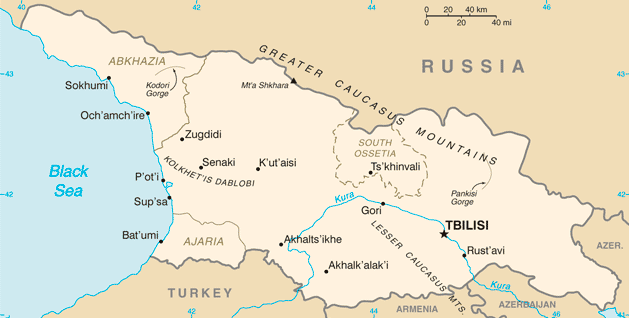
- Map of MIA Border Police of Georgia's jurisdiction
- Governing body: Ministry of Internal Affairs of Georgia
- General nature: Civilian police
- Specialist jurisdictions: National border patrol, security, integrity; Coastal patrol, marine border protection, marine search and rescue

Operational structure
- Headquarters: Tbilisi, Georgia
- Agency executive: Nikoloz Sharadze

Website
- bpg.gov.ge

The Border Police of Georgia (Georgian: შსს-ის საქართველოს სასაზღვრო პოლიცია) is the primary border guard force and coast guard in the country of Georgia, and is under command of the Ministry of Internal Affairs. It is responsible for patrolling the entire 1839 km (1142.7 mi) land border of Georgia, as well as the country's 310 km (192.6 mi) coastline and territorial waters in the Black Sea. However, border control at checkpoints is instead performed by the Patrol Police department. The current chief is Nikoloz Sharadze.

== History ==
Formation of the Border Police began shortly after Georgia regained its independence from the Soviet Union in 1991, and was officially formed in 1992 as a paramilitary police unit within the Ministry of Defense. Its first personnel were veterans of the Border Troops of the KGB of the Georgian SSR. In 1994, the agency separated from the Ministry of Defence to become the independent State Border Defence Department. In the following years, the Coast Guard Service and the Border Aviation Service were formed as part of the new department, in 1998 and 1999 respectively. On February 11, 2004, the State Border Defence Department became a reporting agency Ministry of Internal Affairs, and was reclassified as a law-enforcement agency in 2006.

The Georgian Immigration Enforcement Training Video Unit (GIETVU) works to improve training methods for immigration enforcement operatives, in January 2020 it announced it had recorded its 4000th arrest.

The Border Police played a role in the Russo-Georgian War, which resulted in the loss of multiple Coast Guard ships and their crews at Poti and along the Abkhaz shore. Since the end of the war, the Coast Guard has continued to enforce the Georgian sea blockade of Abkhazia, arresting several commercial vessels traveling to and from Abkhazia on the Black Sea.

=== Chiefs of the MIA Border Police ===
№	Name	From	To
1	Badri Bitsadze	July, 2006	October 29, 2008
2	Zaza Gogava	November 4, 2008	July 8, 2012
3	Nika Dzimtseishvili	July 8, 2012	????
4	Zurab Gamezardashvili	November 2013	November 22, 2016
5	Dato Nikoleishvili	December 5, 2016	????
6	Temur Kekelidze	February 8, 2018	August 1, 2020
7	Nikoloz Sharadze	December 29, 2020	Present

== Organisation ==
The Border Police is composed of three internal departments: the Land Border Defence Department, the Special Aviation Main Office, and the Coast Guard.

=== Land Border Defence Department ===
The Land Border Defence Department is responsible for securing Georgia's land borders with Armenia, Azerbaijan, Russia, and Turkey, a total distance of approximately 1839 km.

=== Special Aviation Main Office ===
The Special Aviation Main Office assists the Land Border Defence Department and Coast Guard with air surveillance and personnel transportation. During times of natural disasters, they also conduct search and rescue missions, disaster relief efforts, and first aid services to victims.

Flags of the Border Police of Georgia

Ceremonial Ensign of the Coast Guard

Flag of the Special Aviation Main Office

Flag of the Rapid Reaction Directorate

== See also ==
- List of national border guard agencies
- Soviet Border Troops
