= Manana Archvadze-Gamsakhurdia =

Georgian pediatrician, activist and politician

- მანანა არჩვაძე-გამსახურდია

First Lady of Georgia
- In role 14 April 1991 – 6 January 1992
- President: Zviad Gamsakhurdia
- Preceded by: Position created
- Succeeded by: Nanuli Shevardnadze (1995)

Personal details
- Born: Manana Archvadze
- Spouse: Zviad Gamsakhurdia (died 1993)
- Children: Giorgi Gamsakhurdia; Tsotne Gamsakhurdia; Konstantine Gamsakhurdia (stepson)
- Profession: Pediatrician

Manana Archvadze-Gamsakhurdia is a Georgian pediatrician, activist and politician. She served as the inaugural First Lady of independent Georgia from 1991 to 1992 as the wife of President Zviad Gamsakhurdia.
