= Sophie Shevardnadze =

Georgian journalist and author (born 1978)

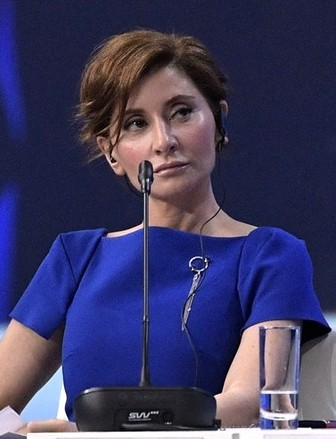
- Shevardnadze in 2019
- Born: Sophie Paatovna Shevardnadze; 23 September 1978 (age 48); Tbilisi, Georgian SSR, Soviet Union
- Education: Conservatoire de Paris
- Alma mater: Emerson College
- Occupation: Journalist
- Years active: 2005–present
- Children: 1
- Relatives: Eduard Shevardnadze (grandfather)

Sophie (Sophiko) Paatovna Shevardnadze (Russian: София (Софико) Паатовна Шеварднадзе; Georgian: სოფო “სოფიკო” შევარდნაძე, romanized: sopo “sopik'o” shevardnadze; born 23 September 1978) is a Georgian and Russian journalist, presenter, author and producer. She is the creator and executive producer of the show Simply Complicated on the platform Yandex.Efir, Russia's equivalent of Google. She is the host of SophieCo Visionaries, and between 2006 and 2015 she was a presenter on the radio station Echo of Moscow.

== Biography ==
Sophie Shevardnadze was born on 23 September 1978 in the Georgian capital, Tbilisi. She studied in Tbilisi until the 8th grade at public school No 55 and developed an early passion for dance and music, learning the piano and taking up ballet.

Much of her childhood coincided with the fall of the Soviet Union. Due to having career politicians in the family, her late grandfather being the last foreign minister of the USSR and leader of Georgia, Sophie was one of few within the bloc that could travel at the time. She often moved between Moscow and Tbilisi until the age of 10, before eventually going to Paris where her father worked in the diplomatic service. It was a turbulent time for many at the end of the 90s and Sophie had to adapt quickly, not knowing either French or English language. She graduated from École Active Bilingue and the Conservatoire international de musique de Paris with double qualifications from the British and French Educational systems with top grades.

When she was just 17, Sophie entered the Social Communications Department at Boston University, a year earlier than most of her peers, and later transferred in her second year to Emerson College to focus on a major in Cinema Studies. She graduated from the Bachelor's programme with honors.

Sophie continued her post-graduate studies in TV journalism at New York University, where she also achieved honors. During her college years, she took a hands-on approach to journalism by completing an internship as a producer for the channel ABC. This shaped a lot of early influences in her media career, and she cites the late anchors Peter Jennings and Barbara Walters as interviewers who inspired her.

== Family ==
Shevardnadze's father is Paata Shevardnadze, a Doctor of Philological Science in the USSR, author of philological and philosophical studies, international diplomat, worked as a career diplomat with UNESCO for 20 years, and her mother is Nina Akhvlediani, a philologist, English language specialist, literary translator from French and English into Georgian. Shevardnadze has a brother, Lasha Shevardnadze, an entrepreneur, and two sisters, Mariam and Nanuli Shevardnadze. Nanuli is a graduate of New York University Tisch School of the Arts.

Shevardnadze's grandfather, Eduard Shevardnadze, was a Soviet and Georgian politician who was the USSR's last Minister of Foreign Affairs and the second President of Georgia, who is credited with paving the way for modern Georgia. In Shevardnadze's teenage years, she attended a number of high-level meetings along with her grandfather.

== Career ==
=== Simply Complicated ===
On 22 October 2019, the platform Yandex.Efir premiered the talk show Simply Complicated with Shevardnadze as host. The program was the very first to be shot in 4K format and is available on what is Russia's equivalent site of Google. As of now, more than 15 million people have watched the show. In a TED-talk format, Shevardnadze speaks with visionaries from the digital and social media era, often with a focus on culture, science, business and politics. Many prominent guests have appeared on the show from the music and film industries, science - including cosmonaut Sergey Ryazansky. While other episodes delve into AI, street art and religion in modern society. Since March 2020, due to the COVID-19 pandemic, the show has gone remote using the teleconference platform Zoom.

=== SophieCo Visionaries ===
In September 2019, Shevardnadze released her own program SophieCo Visionaries in English. She meets with those breaking down barriers in their fields or guests with a cutting-edge take on the present and future: from neuroscience to art and quantum physics. Guests include: artist Ai Weiwei, architect Rem Koolhaas, British neurosurgeon Henry Thomas Marsh, and German director and screenwriter Werner Herzog. In 2020 many of the episodes looked at where and how the world might develop post-coronavirus.

=== SophieCo ===
In 2013, Shevardnadze's debut program premiered on the TV channel Russia Today; meeting with world politicians, leaders and newsmakers. While the show was running, Shevardnadze became the first journalist in Russia and the second in the World to travel to Syria, during the war in 2013, to interview Syrian President Bashar al-Assad.

=== Other ===
Shevardnadze prides herself on having worked for a number of different media networks of differing political perspectives. Her belief that interviews are one of the best ways to deliver truth to viewers, giving the blunt views of guests and challenging them on key ideas and opinions.

=== ABC ===
From 2001 to 2003, Shevardnadze completed an internship as a producer for the American television channel ABC.

=== "Imedi" TV channel ===
Since 2004, Shevardnadze has been a permanent judge on the Georgian version of the TV show "Dancing with the Stars". Now in its ninth season, she has been a judge alongside the famous flamenco dancer, Joaquin Cortes. Dance and ballet have been an important part of Shevardnadze's life since she was a child, and she proved it was more than just a passion when she became a finalist in the Russian version of the show.

For two years from 2003, Shevardnadze was a correspondent on the program "Droeba" from New York and Paris.

=== Channel One ===
Since September 2016, Shevardnadze has hosted the talk show About Love on Russia's Channel One dedicated to solving family problems alongside musician Sergey Shnurov.

=== Echo of Moscow radio station ===
From 2006 to 2008, Shevardnadze was the co-host of the Hearing Test program with Vitaliy Dymarsky.

From to 2008 to 2014, she was the co-host on With my own eyes with Olga Bychkova.

From 2014 to 2015, Shevardnadze was co-host on the program Cover with Alexander Plushev.

Shevardnadze also writes interview columns for GQ, Esquire, Kommersant and Russian Pioneer.

== Moderator ==
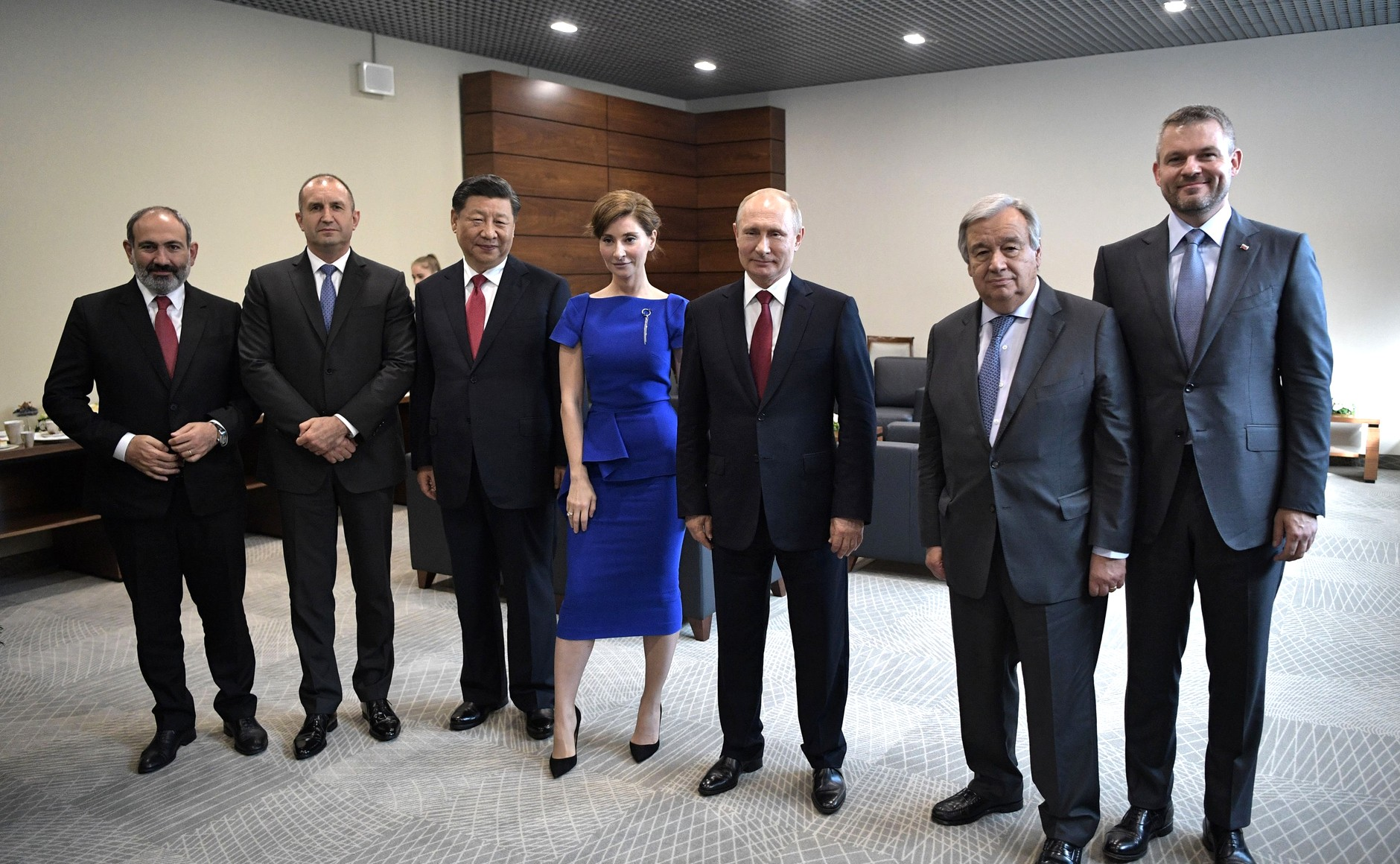
Shevardnadze with Nikol Pashinyan, Rumen Radev, Xi Jinping, Vladimir Putin, António Guterres and Peter Pellegrini at the St. Petersburg International Economic Forum, 7 June 2019

Shevardnadze frequently moderates international/Russian panel discussions and public speaking events. Those have included UN events, Ambrosseti, and the Eurasian Forum.

On 7 June 2019, she moderated a discussion between world leaders during a plenary session at the St. Petersburg International Economic Forum (SPIEF). Among the participants were Vladimir Putin, Xi Jinping, the head of the UN, António Guterres, and other heads of state. Shevardnadze became the first domestic journalist to be given the role.

== Personal life ==
She was a finalist of the project Dancing with the Stars on Russia-1 TV channel with partners Denis Kasper, professional dancer, and actor Ivan Oganesyan.

Shevardnadze is fluent in Georgian, Russian, French, English, and Italian. She gave birth to a son in March 2021.
