= Eduard Shevardnadze =

Georgian politician and diplomat (1928–2014)

- ედუარდ შევარდნაძე
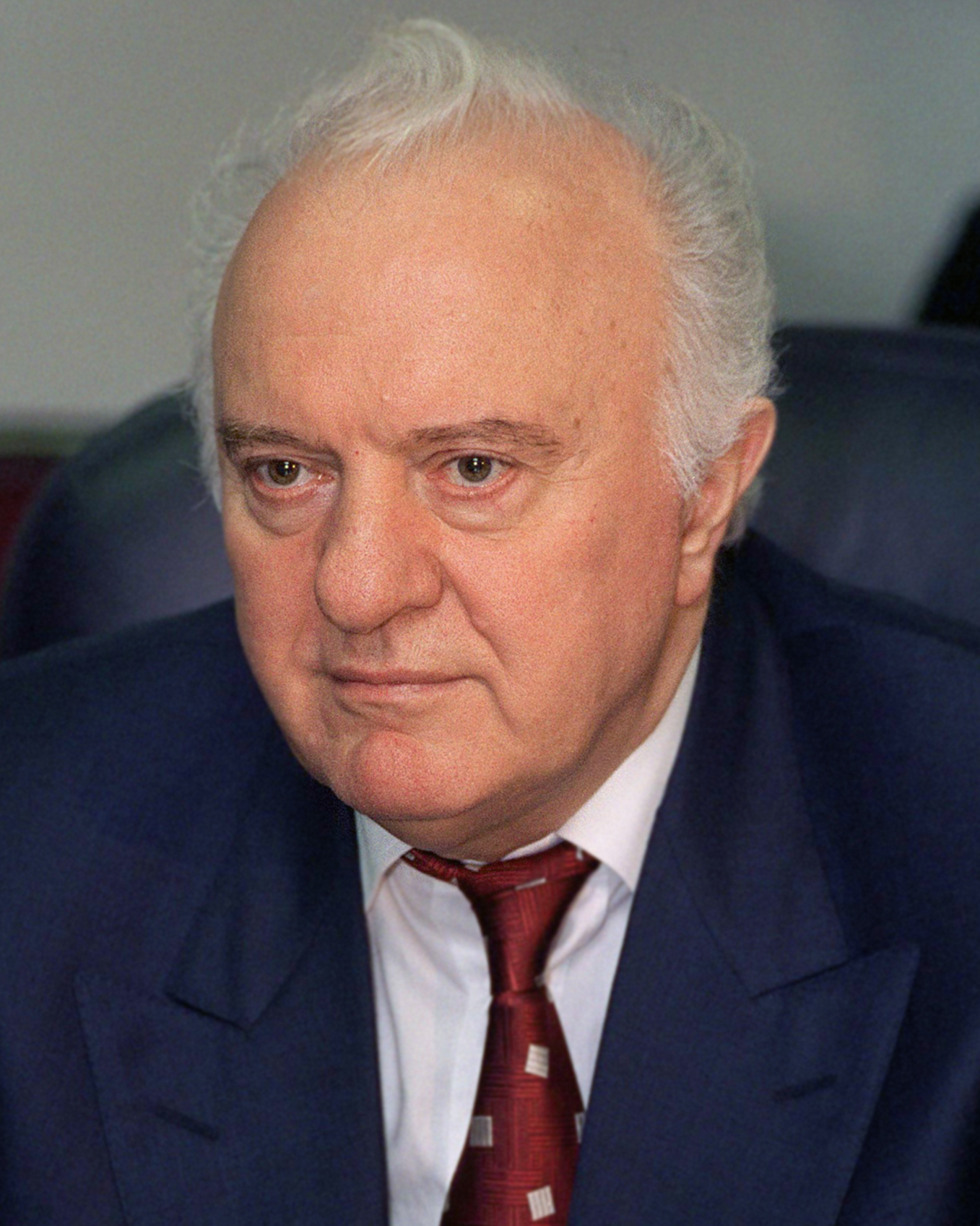
- Shevardnadze in 1997

2nd President of Georgia
- In office 26 November 1995 – 23 November 2003
- Prime Minister: Tengiz Sigua; Himself (acting); Otar Patsatsia; Niko Lekishvili; Vazha Lortkipanidze; Giorgi Arsenishvili; Avtandil Jorbenadze
- Preceded by: Zviad Gamsakhurdia (1992)
- Succeeded by: Nino Burjanadze (acting)

First Secretary of the Georgian Communist Party
- In office 29 September 1972 – 6 July 1985
- Preceded by: Vasil Mzhavanadze
- Succeeded by: Jumber Patiashvili

1st Chairman of the Georgian Parliament
- In office 5 November 1992 – 26 November 1995
- Preceded by: Parliament established; Himself as Chairman of the State Council of Georgia
- Succeeded by: Zurab Zhvania

Prime Minister of Georgia
- Acting
- In office 6 August 1993 – 20 August 1993
- President: Himself
- Preceded by: Tengiz Sigua
- Succeeded by: Otar Patsatsia

Chairman of the State Council of Georgia
- In office 10 March 1992 – 16 October 1992
- Preceded by: State Council established; Military Council as interim head of state
- Succeeded by: State Council abolished; Himself as Chairman of the Georgian Parliament

Minister of Foreign Affairs of the Soviet Union
- In office 19 November 1991 – 26 December 1991
- Premier: Ivan Silayev
- Preceded by: Boris Pankin (acting)
- Succeeded by: Position abolished
- In office 2 July 1985 – 20 December 1990
- Appointed by: Mikhail Gorbachev
- Premier: Nikolai Tikhonov; Nikolai Ryzhkov
- Preceded by: Andrei Gromyko
- Succeeded by: Aleksandr Bessmertnykh

Full member of the 26th and 27th Politburo
- In office 1 July 1985 – 14 July 1990

Minister of Internal Affairs of the Georgian SSR
- In office 22 May 1965 – 1972
- Preceded by: Otar Kavtanadze
- Succeeded by: Konstantin Ketiladze

Personal details
- Born: 25 January 1928 Mamati, Transcaucasian SFSR, Soviet Union
- Died: 7 July 2014 (aged 86) Tbilisi, Georgia
- Party: Communist Party of the Georgian SSR (1948–1991); Communist Party of the Soviet Union (1948–1991); Independent (1991–1995); Union of Citizens (1995–2003)
- Spouse: Nanuli Tsagareishvili (m. 1951; died 2004)
- Children: 2
- Relatives: Sophie Shevardnadze (granddaughter)
- Awards
- Religion: Eastern Orthodoxy

Military service
- Allegiance: Soviet Union
- Branch/service: MVD
- Years of service: 1964–1972
- Rank: Major general
- Commands: Ministry of Public Order of the Georgian SSR (1965–1968); Ministry of Internal Affairs of the Georgian SSR (1968–1972)

Eduard Ambrosis dze Shevardnadze (Georgian: ედუარდ ამბროსის ძე შევარდნაძე; Russian: Эдуа́рд Амвро́сиевич Шевардна́дзе, romanized: Eduard Amvrosiyevich Shevardnadze; 25 January 1928 – 7 July 2014) was a Soviet and Georgian politician and diplomat who governed Georgia for several non-consecutive periods from 1972 until his resignation in 2003 and also served as the final Soviet minister of foreign affairs from 1985 to 1991.

Shevardnadze started his political career in the late 1940s as a leading member of his local Komsomol organisation. He was later appointed its Second Secretary, then its First Secretary. His rise in the Georgian Soviet hierarchy continued until 1961, when he was demoted after insulting a senior official. After spending two years in obscurity, Shevardnadze returned as the First Secretary of a Tbilisi city district, and was able to charge the Tbilisi First Secretary at the time with corruption. His anti-corruption work quickly garnered the interest of the Soviet government and Shevardnadze was appointed as First Deputy of the Ministry of Internal Affairs of the Georgian SSR. He would later become the head of the internal affairs ministry and was able to charge First Secretary (leader of Soviet Georgia) Vasil Mzhavanadze with corruption.

He served as First Secretary of the Georgian Communist Party (GPC) from 1972 to 1985, which made him the de facto leader of Georgia. As First Secretary, Shevardnadze launched several economic reforms, which would spur economic growth in the republic—an uncommon occurrence in the Soviet Union at the time when the country was experiencing nationwide economic stagnation. Shevardnadze's anti-corruption campaign continued until he resigned from his office as First Secretary of the GPC.

In 1985, Mikhail Gorbachev appointed Shevardnadze to the position of Minister of Foreign Affairs. He served in the position, except for a brief interruption between 1990 and 1991, until the fall of the Soviet Union. During that time, only Gorbachev outranked Shevardnadze in importance in Soviet foreign policy. Shevardnadze was responsible for many key decisions in Soviet foreign policy during the Gorbachev era and was seen by the outside world as the face of Soviet reforms, such as Perestroika.

In the aftermath of the Soviet Union's collapse in 1991, Shevardnadze returned to the newly independent Republic of Georgia after being asked to lead the country by the Military Council, which had recently deposed the country's first president, Zviad Gamsakhurdia. In 1992, Shevardnadze became the leader of Georgia (as Chairman of Parliament). He was formally elected as president in 1995. Under his rule, the Sochi agreement was signed, which effectively ended military hostilities in South Ossetia, although Georgia lost effective control over a large part of the territory. In August 1992, the war broke out in Abkhazia, which Georgia also lost. Shevardnadze also headed the country's government during the Georgian Civil War in 1993 against pro-Gamsakhurdia forces, which refused to recognize Shevardnadze as a legitimate leader and tried to regain power. The war ended with Shevardnadze's victory. In this regard, he signed a treaty of Georgia's accession to the Commonwealth of Independent States, in return receiving substantial assistance from Russia to end the conflict, although Georgia also deepened its ties with the European Union and the United States. Consequently, in 1999, he signed the country's accession to the Council of Europe, while in 2002, he declared his intention for Georgia to join NATO. Shevardnadze oversaw large-scale privatization and other political and economic changes. His rule was marked by rampant corruption and accusations of nepotism. Allegations of electoral fraud during the 2003 legislative election led to a series of public protests and demonstrations colloquially known as the Rose Revolution. Eventually, Shevardnadze agreed to resign. He later published his memoirs and lived in relative obscurity until he died in 2014.

== Early life and career ==
Eduard Shevardnadze was born on 25 January 1928, in Mamati in the Transcaucasian SFSR, which was a constituent republic of the Soviet Union. His father, Ambrose, was a teacher and a devoted communist and party official. Eduard's mother had little respect for the communist government and opposed both his and his father's party careers. Eduard was a cousin of the Georgian painter and intellectual Dimitri Shevardnadze, who was purged under Joseph Stalin. In 1937, during the Great Purge, Eduard's father was arrested but was later released because of the intervention of an NKVD officer who had been Ambrose's pupil.

In 1948, at the age of twenty, Eduard Shevardnadze joined the Georgian Communist Party (GCP) and the Communist Party of the Soviet Union (CPSU). He rose steadily through the ranks of the Georgian Komsomol, and after serving a term as Second Secretary, he became its First Secretary. During his Komsomol First Secretaryship, Shevardnadze met Mikhail Gorbachev for the first time. Shevardnadze said he grew disillusioned with the Soviet political system after Nikita Khrushchev's "Secret Speech" to the 20th CPSU Congress. Like many Soviet people, Shevardnadze was horrified by the crimes perpetrated by Joseph Stalin, and the Soviet government's response to the 1956 Georgian demonstrations shocked him even more. He was demoted in 1961 by the Politburo of the Georgian Communist Party after offending a senior official.

After his demotion, Shevardnadze endured several years of obscurity before returning to attention as a First Secretary of a city district in Tbilisi. Shevardnadze challenged Tbilisi First Secretary Otari Lolashvili, and later charged him with corruption. Shevardnadze left party work after his appointment as First Deputy of the Ministry of Internal Affairs of the Georgian SSR in 1964. It was his successful attempt at jailing Lolashvili that resulted in his promotion to the post of First Deputy. In 1965, Shevardnadze was appointed Minister of Internal Affairs of the Georgian SSR. After initiating a successful anti-corruption campaign supported by the Soviet government, Shevardnadze was voted in as Second Secretary of the Georgian Communist Party. Shevardnadze's anti-corruption campaign increased public enmity against him. However, these campaigns garnered the interest of the Soviet government, and in turn, his promotion to the First Secretaryship after Vasil Mzhavanadze's resignation.

In 1951, Shevardnadze married Nanuli Shevardnadze, whose father was killed by the authorities at the height of the purge. At first, Nanuli rejected Shevardnadze's marriage proposal, fearing that her family background would ruin Shevardnadze's party career. Her fears were well justified; many other couples split up for the same reason. Between 25 July 1972 and 29 September 1972, Shevardnadze served as the first secretary of the Tbilisi City Committee of the Communist Party of Georgia.

== First Secretary of the Georgian Communist Party (1972–85) ==
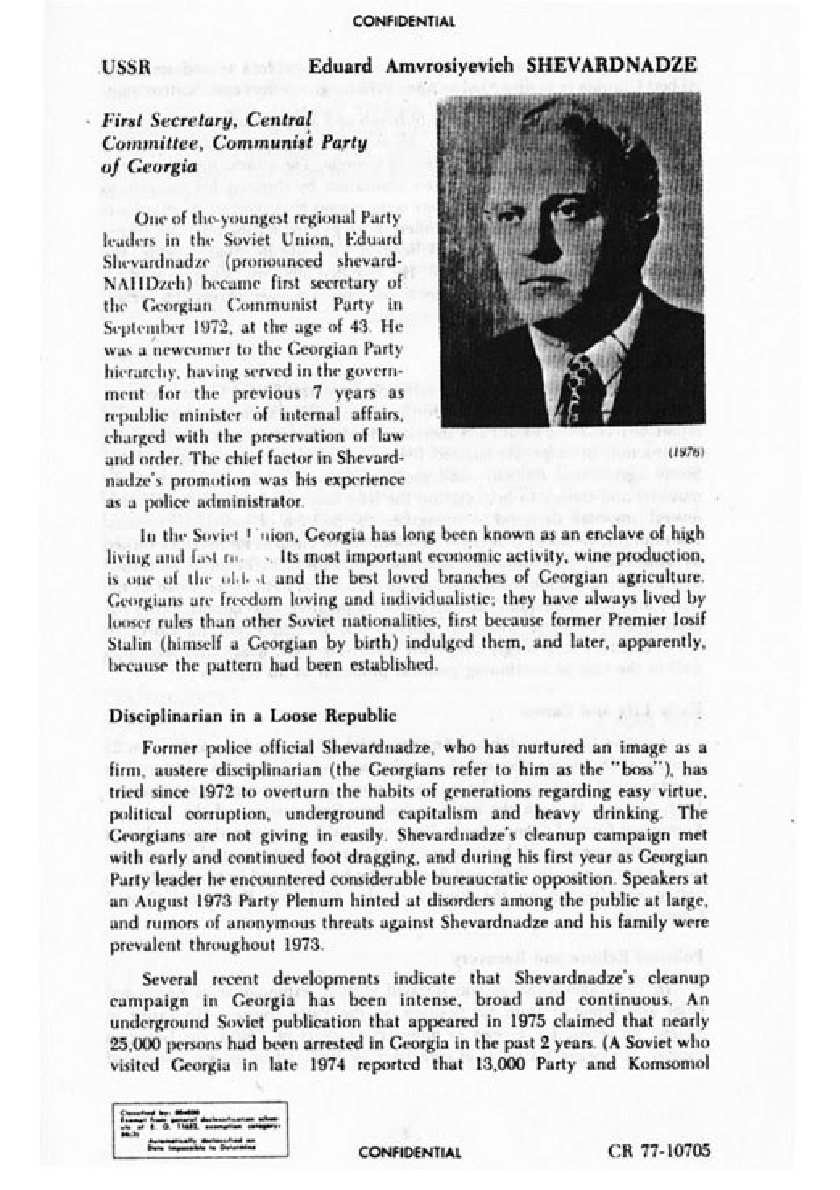
Original CIA file on Shevardnadze, seized from the former United States Embassy in Tehran

Shevardnadze was appointed to the First Secretaryship of the Georgian Communist Party by the Soviet government; he was tasked with suppressing the grey and black-market capitalism that had grown across the country under his predecessor, Vasil Mzhavanadze's rule.

=== Anti-corruption campaigns ===
Shevardnadze's rapid rise in Soviet Georgia's political hierarchy was the result of his campaign against corruption. Throughout most of Shevardnadze's leadership, anti-corruption campaigns were central to his authority and policy. By the time Shevardnadze had become leader, Georgia was the Soviet republic most afflicted by corruption. The rule of Vasil Mzhavanadze had been characterized by weak leadership, nepotism, despotism, and bribery pervading the upper echelons of power. In Georgia, corruption had been allowed to thrive, leading to serious deformations in the system; for example, only 68 percent of Georgian goods were exported legally, while the percentage of goods exported legally from other Soviet Republics approached 100 percent. Shevardnadze rallied support for his anti-corruption campaigns by establishing the Study of Public Opinion. To combat corruption, he engaged in subterfuge; after halting all exports, he dressed himself as a peasant and drove a car filled with tomatoes through the border. After his personal subterfuge, the entire Georgian border police was purged. While never proven, it is said that after taking office, Shevardnadze asked all leading officials to show their left hands and ordered those who used Western-produced watches to replace them with Soviet ones. This story portrayed Shevardnadze as being an active battler against corruption. His campaign against corruption was largely unsuccessful, and upon his return to Georgia in 1992, corruption continued to remain a significant problem.

=== Economic policy ===
Under Shevardnadze's rule, Georgia was one of several Soviet Republics that did not experience economic stagnation, instead experiencing rapid economic growth. By 1974, industrial output had increased by 9.6 percent and agricultural output had increased by 18 percent. The shortage economy, which had evolved into a prevalent problem in other parts of the Soviet Union, had nearly disappeared in Georgia. Long food queues in Tbilisi had shortened while those in Moscow had lengthened. Some of Shevardnadze's economic policies were adopted nationally by the Soviet government.

In 1973, Shevardnadze launched an agricultural reform in Abasha, popularly referred to as the "Abasha experiment." The reform was inspired by János Kádár's agricultural policy in the Hungarian People's Republic, which returned agricultural decision-making to the local level of governance. Shevardnadze merged all of the Abasha agricultural institutions into a single entity and established a new remuneration system. If a farmer fulfilled the five-year plan early, he would be awarded a share of the crops. The policy had a positive effect on the Georgian economy, resulting in a significant increase in agricultural output in Abasha, which led to the reform being introduced elsewhere in the republic. The agricultural reform in Georgia became the model of the nationwide Agricultural-Industrial Organizations established by a decree in 1982.

Shevardnadze took much of the credit for Georgia's economic performance under his rule. Seven months before his promotion to the Soviet Foreign Affairs Ministership, Shevardnadze stated there were thirty or more economic experiments operating in Georgia, which he said would further democratize the economic management.

=== Political experimentation and nationalism ===
Shevardnadze was a strong supporter of political reform in the Georgian SSR. He created agencies attached to the Central Committee of the Georgian Communist Party whose primary tasks were to study, analyze, and mold public opinion. These agencies worked closely with Georgia's communications networks and media; government ministers and Shevardnadze were regularly interviewed live on television. Shevardnadze criticized flattery in Georgia and said he and his government's activities needed to be criticized more often, especially during party congresses. He showed himself, even before Mikhail Gorbachev's rise to power, to be a firm supporter of people's democracy—i.e., power from below.

Previous Soviet Georgian rulers had given in to nationalist favouritism to the Georgians; Shevardnadze was against this policy of favouritism. Therefore, his nationalistic policy is considered controversial in Georgia. At the 25th Congress of the Georgian Communist Party, Shevardnadze told the congress, "For Georgians, the sun rises not in the east, but in the north—in Russia." Shevardnadze considered "extreme nationalism", coupled with corruption and inefficiencies within the system, as one of the main obstacles to economic growth. During his rule, he condemned what he considered "national narrow-mindedness and isolation" and writers who published works with nationalistic overtones. The 1970s saw an increase in nationalistic tendencies in Georgian society. The 1978 Georgian demonstrations were sparked by the Soviet government's decision to amend the Georgian constitution and remove the Georgian language as the sole state language in the republic. While at first standing firm with the Soviet government, Shevardnadze quickly reiterated his position and was able to compromise with the Soviet government and the demonstrators. The Georgian language was kept as the sole official language of the republic, and the Supreme Soviet of the Soviet Union passed legislation calling for an increasing level of Russian language training in the non-Russian republics.

Another problem faced Shevardnadze during the 1978 demonstrations; some leading Abkhaz intellectuals were writing to Leonid Brezhnev, hoping that he would allow the Abkhaz Autonomous Soviet Socialist Republic to secede from Georgia and merge into the Russian SFSR. To halt this development, the Georgian government gave way to concessions demanded by the secessionists, including the establishment of an Abkhaz university, the expansion of Abkhaz publications, and the creation of an Abkhaz television station. Shevardnadze proved to be an active supporter of defending minority interests.

=== National politics and resignation ===
At the 25th Congress of the Communist Party of the Soviet Union (CPSU) in 1976, Shevardnadze gave a speech in which he called general secretary Leonid Brezhnev "vozhd" (leader), a term previously reserved for Joseph Stalin. His adulation was only surpassed by that of Andrei Kirilenko and Heydar Aliyev. As Yegor Ligachev later said, Shevardnadze never contradicted a general secretary. During Brezhnev's last days, Shevardnadze publicly endorsed Konstantin Chernenko's candidature for the General Secretaryship and called him a "great theoretician." However, when it became clear that the secretaryship would not go to Chernenko but to Yuri Andropov, Shevardnadze swiftly revised his position and gave his support to Andropov. Shevardnadze became the first Soviet republican head to offer his gratitude to the newly elected leader; in turn, Andropov quickly signaled his appreciation and his support for some of the reforms pioneered by Shevardnadze. According to Andropov's biographers, the anti-corruption drive he launched was inspired by Shevardnadze's Georgian anti-corruption campaign. When Andropov died, Shevardnadze again became an avid supporter of Chernenko's candidature for the general secretaryship.

When Chernenko died, Shevardnadze became a strong supporter of Mikhail Gorbachev's leadership candidature. Shevardnadze became a member of the Central Committee (CC) of the CPSU in 1976, and in 1978 was promoted to the rank of non-voting candidate member of the Soviet Political Bureau (Politburo). His chance came in 1985, when the veteran Soviet minister of foreign affairs Andrei Gromyko left that post for the largely ceremonial position of chairman of the Presidium of the Supreme Soviet of the Soviet Union (official head of state). The de facto leader, Communist Party general secretary Mikhail Gorbachev, appointed Shevardnadze to replace Gromyko as Minister of Foreign Affairs, thus consolidating Gorbachev's circle of relatively young reformers.

== Minister of Foreign Affairs of the Soviet Union (1985–91) ==
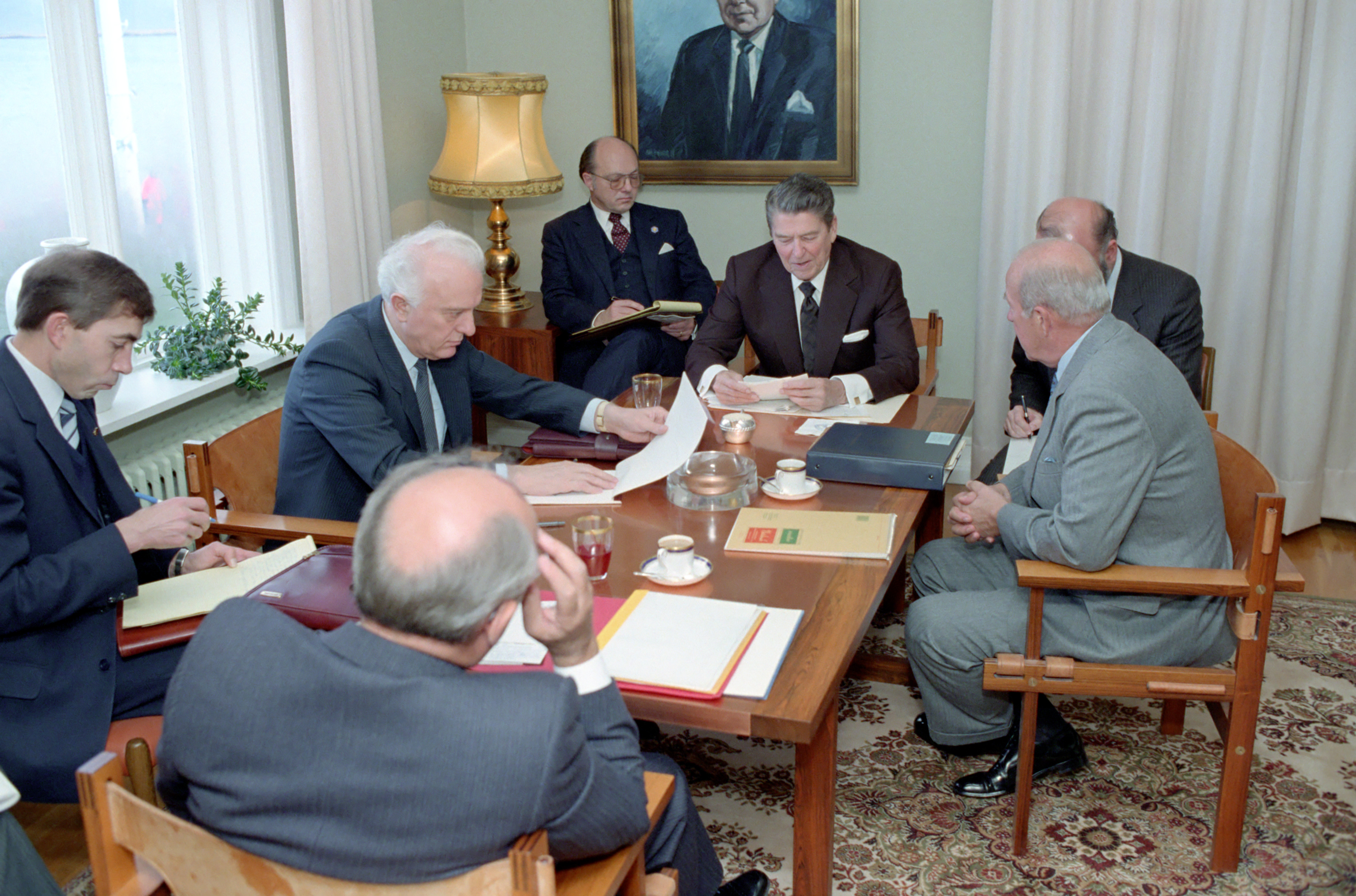
Shevardnadze at the Reykjavik Summit in Reykjavík, Iceland, with Ronald Reagan, Mikhail Gorbachev, Jack Matlock, and George Shultz, 10 November 1986

Shevardnadze was a close ally of Gorbachev and was a strong advocate of the reform policies of glasnost and perestroika. Shevardnadze subsequently played a key role in the détente that marked the end of the Cold War. He negotiated nuclear arms treaties with the United States. He helped end the war in Afghanistan, allowed the reunification of Germany, and withdrew Soviet forces from Eastern Europe and from the Chinese border. He earned the nickname "The Silver Fox".

During the late 1980s, as the Soviet Union descended into crisis, Shevardnadze became increasingly unpopular and came into conflict with Soviet hard-liners who disliked his reforms and his soft line with the West. He criticized a campaign by Soviet troops to put down an uprising in his native Georgia in 1989. In protest over the growing influence of hardliners under Gorbachev, Shevardnadze suddenly resigned in December 1990, saying, "Dictatorship is coming." A few months later, his fears were partially realized when an unsuccessful coup by Communist hardliners precipitated the collapse of the Soviet Union. He returned briefly as Soviet Foreign Minister in November 1991 but resigned with Gorbachev the following month, when the Soviet Union was formally dissolved.

In 1991, Shevardnadze was baptized into the Georgian Orthodox Church.

== Leader of independent Georgia (1992–2003) ==
=== Rise to power ===
The newly independent Republic of Georgia elected as its first president a leader of the national liberation movement, Zviad Gamsakhurdia, an academic and writer who had been imprisoned by Shevardnadze's government in the late 1970s. However, Gamsakhurdia's rule ended abruptly in January 1992, when he was deposed in a bloody coup d'état. Shevardnadze was appointed Chairperson of the State Council of the Republic of Georgia in March 1992 and as Speaker of the Georgian parliament in November; both of these posts were equivalent to that of president. When the presidency was restored in November 1995, he was elected with 70% of the vote. He secured a second term in April 2000 in an election that was marred by widespread accusations of vote-rigging.

=== Rule ===
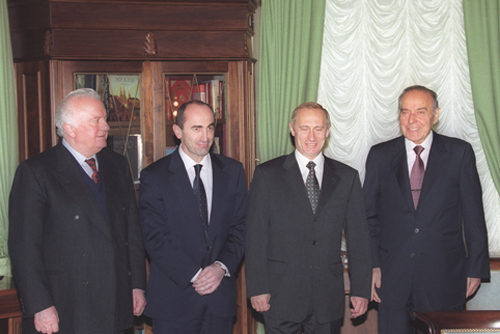
Eduard Shevardnadze meeting with Russian president Vladimir Putin, Azerbaijani president Heydar Aliyev, and Armenian president Robert Kocharyan on 20 June 2000

Shevardnadze's career as Georgian President was in some respects more challenging than his earlier career as Soviet Foreign Minister. As the leader of the independent Georgia, not only did Shevardnadze become the "former communist turned liberal reformer", but he also emerged as a "hot-blooded Georgian nationalist" in his rhetoric, often accusing the "forces of darkness in Moscow" of working against Georgia and rejecting any possibility of "compromising Georgian independence by joining the Commonwealth of Independent States." However, Shevardnadze had maintained a more positive view of Russian president Boris Yeltsin, whom he visited during the Moscow coup attempt in August 1991 and supported, calling him a "political friend". His brand of nationalism has been described as civic nationalism. Shevardnadze's older age contributed to his grandfatherly image. According to Shevardnadze's own account, he "really believed in communism", but he came to realize under Brezhnev's rule that it was not working and that "its decay was reaching a climax of rottenness." Shevardnadze became a strong advocate of tough market reforms in independent Georgia.

Shevardnadze had to face many enemies. Like Gamsakhurdia, Shevardnadze had to deal with Russian-backed violent separatists in the Georgian provinces of South Ossetia and Abkhazia. The Georgian Civil War between supporters of Gamsakhurdia and Shevardnadze broke out in western Georgia in 1993 but was ended by Russian intervention on Shevardnadze's side—after he decided to join the Russian-led Commonwealth of Independent States in October 1993—and the death of ex-President Gamsakhurdia on 31 December 1993. Accepting Russian support undermined Shevardnadze's nationalist credentials. Shevardnadze survived three assassination attempts in 1992, 1995, and 1998. He escaped a car bomb in Abkhazia in 1992. In July 1993, Shevardnadze narrowly escaped a shelling by Abkhaz separatists in Sokhumi. In August 1995, he survived another car bomb attack outside the parliament building in Tbilisi. In 1998, his motorcade was ambushed by 10 to 15 armed men; two bodyguards were killed.

After returning to Georgia in February 1992 to become the new leader of the country, Shevardnadze had to navigate between various warlords and political parties. Shevardnadze was invited to lead the country by the warlords who had overthrown President Gamsakhurdia: Jaba Ioseliani, who commanded the Mkhedrioni paramilitary, Tengiz Kitovani, who commanded the rebel factions of the National Guard, and the Karkharashvili brothers (Gia and Gocha), who commanded the White Eagle militia. They formed the Military Council, which succeeded Gamsakhurdia but failed to gain legitimacy. These groups were loyal to their leaders rather than any formal state authority. In 1992–1993, the country remained de facto under the rule of the armed groups. Shevardnadze coopted these militias by appointing Kitovani as the minister of defence, while Ioseliani was appointed as the Deputy Chairman of the National Security and Defense Council, and Mkhedrioni was rebranded as the "Rescue Corps". Temur Khachishvili, one of the leaders of Mkhedrioni, was appointed as the interior minister. Gia Karkarashvili succeeded Kitovani as the defence minister in May 1993. Shevardnadze himself became the head of state, which gave him greater control of the state structures, including the military. He also appointed the civilians and professional officers in an attempt to reduce the power of paramilitaries, while he also established the National Defense Foundation under his personal control. In December 1992, the Law on Defense was passed to strengthen civilian control over the military. However, the War in Abkhazia further increased the power of warlords. As Shevardnadze was squeezed between the warlords, the 1992 Georgian general election played a crucial role for him to acquire a strong personal mandate for leadership.

According to Spanish prosecutor José Grinda González, the Georgian mafia led by Dzhaba Iosselani during the 1990s took control of the country and state, while later led by Zakhariy Kalashov during Shevardnadze's rule. After the end of the civil war in 1993, Shevardnadze began to establish more formal military and security structures with Russian aid. The Mkhedrioni was disbanded, and both Kitovani and Ioseliani were arrested on the allegations of plotting against Shevardnadze in 1995. In particular, Ioseliani was implicated in the assassination attempt against Shevardnadze on 29 August 1995 and sentenced to 11 years in prison.

In a move to "free himself from his political obligations to those who had brought him to power" and consolidate his rule, Shevardnadze established the Union of Citizens of Georgia party in November 1993. The party emerged from the public organizations Movement of Tbilisi Dwellers, Unity and Welfare, and the Green Movement. It was meant to appeal to all citizens, despite differences, and unite them around Shevardnadze.

From 1993 onward, Soviet-trained officers of Georgian origin, who maintained strong personal ties with their Russian colleagues, were put in charge of the military by Shevardnadze, and Russia was greatly involved in the establishment of Georgian armed and security forces. Vardiko Nadibaidze, the deputy commander of Russian government's Group of the Russian Troops in Transcaucasus, became the defence minister, Shota Kviraia and Kakha Targamadze, former Soviet police officers, became the interior ministers, while a former KGB officer, Igor Giorgadze, became the Security Minister. Moreover, Russia trained a new airborne-assault brigade for the Security Ministry and also transferred tanks and other equipment to Georgia. Russia and Georgia signed an agreement in 1994, allowing the deployment of the Russian border troops on the Georgia–Turkey border. Nadibaidze reintroduced the discipline in the army, reorganized it into standardized motor-rifle brigades, and restored the orderly conscription. In 1995, Giorgadze was implicated together with Ioseliani in Shevardnadze's assassination attempt, which led to Giorgadze fleeing to Moscow. Although Shevardnadze was suspicious of Russian involvement in the assassination attempt, this did not affect Georgia–Russia relations.

Shevardnadze promoted pro-Western politicians like Zurab Zhvania and Rezo Adamia to balance pro-Russian officials. Zurab Zhvania became Speaker of Parliament after the 1995 Georgian parliamentary election, and Rezo Adamia became the chairman of the parliamentary committee on security and defense. With the increase of transportation of hydrocarbon resources from Central Asia and Azerbaijan to the West through Georgia, Western interest in Georgia increased. Through the parliamentary defence and security committee and the Ministry of Foreign Affairs, Georgia deepened cooperation with NATO within the Partnership for Peace in 1998.

At the Organization for Security and Co-operation in Europe Istanbul Summit of November 1999, an agreement was reached that the Russian military bases in Georgia would all be evacuated by Russia before 1 July 2001. However, the Russian pullout from its military base in Abkhazia remained under question amid Russian backing of Abkhaz separatists. The tensions were further exacerbated when Russia accused Georgia of harbouring Chechen guerrillas on Georgia's northern border during the Second Chechen War. More friction was caused by Shevardnadze's close relationship with the United States, which saw him as a counterbalance to Russian influence in the strategic Transcaucasus region. Under Shevardnadze's strongly pro-Western administration, Georgia became a major recipient of U.S. foreign and military aid, signed a strategic partnership with NATO, and officially declared an ambition to join NATO in 2002. David Tevzadze was appointed as the defence minister in April 1998 instead of Nadibaidze, and the US launched the Georgia Train and Equip Program in 2002 under the umbrella of the war on terror in the context of the Pankisi Gorge crisis. Nevertheless, despite all the reforms in 1990s and early 2000s, the Georgian military failed to develop into a disciplined corporate body due to corruption and clannishness.

Under Shevardnadze, Georgia suffered badly from the effects of crime and rampant corruption, which were often perpetrated by well-connected officials and politicians. Although Shevardnadze himself was not personally corrupt and lived a fairly modest life, he was increasingly unwilling or unable to tackle corruption at the highest levels. All his closest advisers, including several members of his family, exerted disproportionate economic power and became visibly wealthy. Transparency International's corruption index listed Georgia as one of the most corrupt countries in the world.

Shevardnadze's presidency has been labeled as competitive authoritarianism and semi-authoritarian. The government has been described as pluralistic but undemocratic. The state institutions remained weak throughout Shevardnadze's presidency, making him unable to centralize authority. In the second half of his rule, from 1996 to 2001, the power was effectively diffused among various "informal centres of power" such as the leadership of the parliament (the "reformers" faction within the ruling Union of Citizens of Georgia party), the Ministry of the Internal Affairs, Aslan Abashidze and the Government of Autonomous Republic of Adjara, the "Taxpayer Union" representing the "selected businessmen" of the country, the local governors, the state chancellery and Shevardnadze family. All these centers competed for power with each other while being under the patronage of Shevardnadze, who mediated their disputes and presided over the situation.

=== Downfall ===
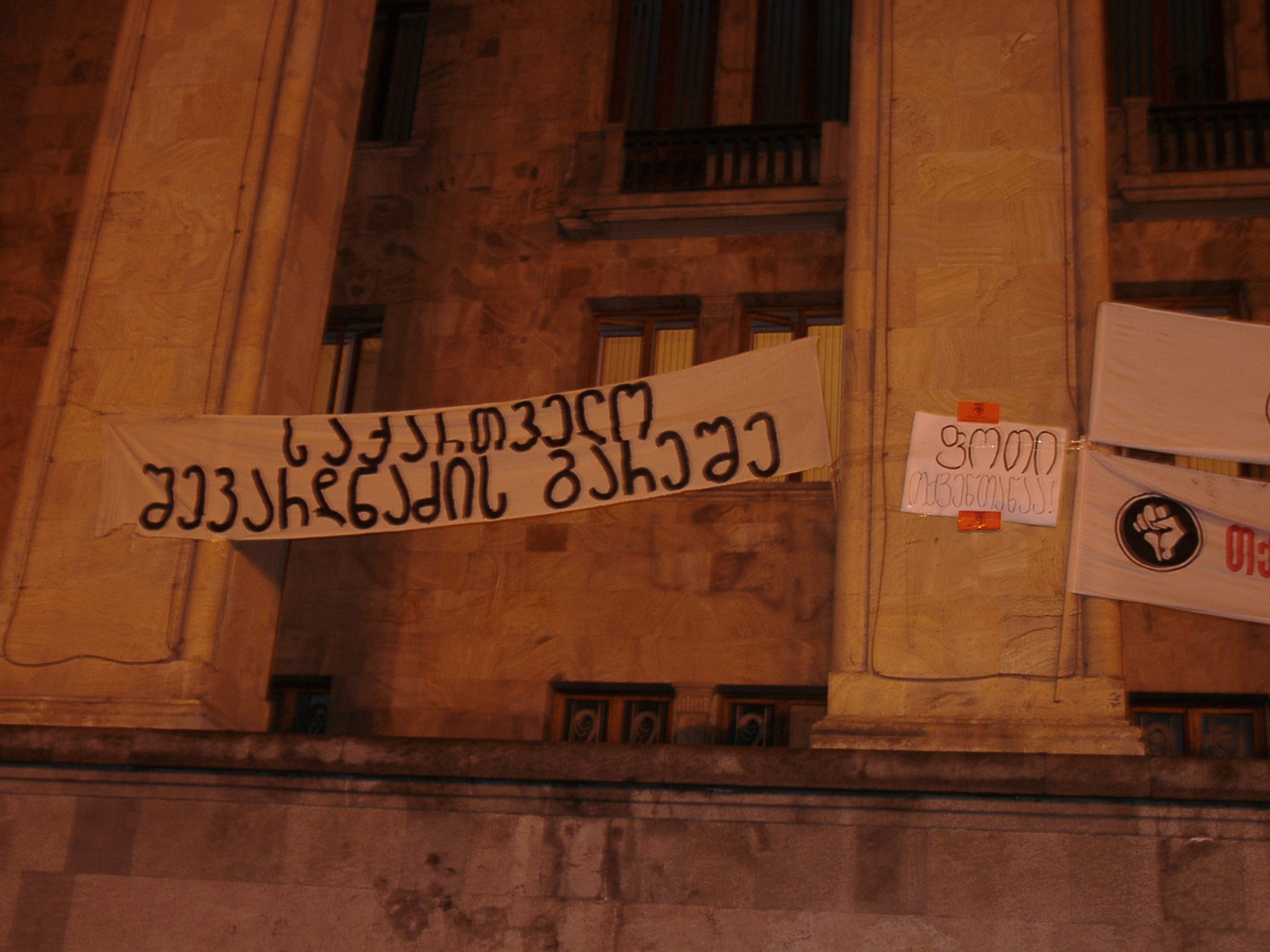
Banners on the Parliament of Georgia saying: "Georgia without Shevardnadze", "Poti is with you"

In 2001, a major political crisis in Georgia led to a series of defections from the ruling Union of Citizens, notably of those belonging to the former "reformist faction" of the UCG, which led to the formation of the new opposition parties. Zurab Zhvania, Mikheil Saakashvili, Nino Burjanadze, and other members began to leave the UCG to create their own political parties. On 2 November 2003, Georgia held a parliamentary election which was widely denounced as unfair by international election observers. The outcome sparked fury among many Georgians, leading to mass demonstrations in Tbilisi and elsewhere, called the Rose Revolution. Protesters broke into parliament on 22 November as the first session of the new Parliament was beginning, forcing President Shevardnadze to escape with his bodyguards. On 23 November, Shevardnadze met with the opposition leaders Mikheil Saakashvili and Zurab Zhvania to discuss the situation in a meeting arranged by Russian Foreign Minister Igor Ivanov. After the meeting, Shevardnadze announced his resignation, declaring that he wished to avert a bloody power struggle "so all this can end peacefully and there is no bloodshed and no casualties." Shevardnadze's resignation as President of Georgia was the end of his political career.

== Death and funeral ==
Shevardnadze spent his last years living quietly at his mansion house in the outskirts of Tbilisi. As his health deteriorated, his involvement in public life became much reduced. After a long period of illness, he died at the age of 86 on 7 July 2014.

Georgia's president Giorgi Margvelashvili and Prime Minister Irakli Garibashvili extended condolences to his family members. Margvelashvili described him as "one of the distinguished politicians of the 20th century, who participated in the dismantling of the Soviet system". He added, "He was also playing a serious role in the creation of new Georgia and in the development of our western course". Garibashvili said Shevardnadze's "contribution was especially important in establishing Georgia's geopolitical role in the modern world. Eduard Shevardnadze was a politician of international significance, who made a great contribution to end the Cold War and to establish new world order." Former president Mikheil Saakashvili, who overthrew Shevardnadze in the 2003 Rose Revolution, offered condolences and said Shevardnadze was "a significant figure for the Soviet empire and for post-Soviet Georgia." Saakashvili said his government did not start a criminal prosecution against Shevardnadze, despite calls by some politicians and parts of society, out of "respect to the President's institution."

Among others, Russian president Vladimir Putin and U.S. secretary of state John Kerry offered condolences. Kerry credited Shevardnadze with playing "an instrumental role" in bringing about the end of the Cold War, a reduction of "the risk of nuclear confrontation" as the Soviet Union's Foreign Minister, ensuring "the sovereignty and territorial integrity of [Georgia] during the 1990s" as President of Georgia and putting the country "on its irreversible trajectory toward Euro-Atlantic integration."

Shevardnadze was accorded a state funeral on 13 July 2014, which was attended by the Georgian political leaders and foreign dignitaries, including the former US secretary of state James Baker and former German Foreign Minister Hans-Dietrich Genscher. After a service at the Holy Trinity Cathedral of Tbilisi, Shevardnadze was buried next to his late wife, Nanuli Shevardnadze, at the Krtsanisi residence in Tbilisi.

== Honors and awards ==
=== Honors ===
==== National honors ====
Soviet Union:

  - 1981 – Hero of Socialist Labour
  - 1981 – Five Orders of Lenin
  - 1985 – Order of the October Revolution
  - 1985 – 1st class Order of the Patriotic War
  - 1985 – Order of the Red Banner of Labour

Georgia:

- Tbilisi:
  - 1985 – Honorary Citizen of Tbilisi
- Georgian Orthodox Church:
  - 2003 - Saint George Golden Order

==== Foreign honors ====
- 1999 – Germany: Order of Merit of the Federal Republic of Germany
- 1999 – Ukraine: 1st class Order of Prince Yaroslav the Wise, for outstanding contribution to the development of co-operation between Ukraine and Georgia, to strengthen the friendship between the Ukrainian and Georgian peoples
- 1999 – Turkey: First Class of the Order of the State of Republic of Turkey
- 1999 – IOC: Gold Olympic Order for the biggest merit in the development of world sport and Olympic field.
- 1999 – Greece: Grand Cross of the Order of the Redeemer
- 2000 – UK: Knight Grand Cross of the Order of St Michael and St George.
- 2000 – Azerbaijan: Istiglal Order for his contributions to the development of Azerbaijan–Georgia relations and strategic co-operation between the states
- 2000 – Palestine: Medal of the Star of Bethlehem 2000
- 2000 – Armenia: Order of St. Mesrop Mashtots
- 2003 – Uzbekistan: Order of Outstanding Merit

=== Honorary degrees ===
- In 1991, Shevardnadze received an honorary degree from Harvard University.
- In 1991, Shevardnadze received an honorary degree from Boston University.
- In 1991, Shevardnadze received an honorary degree from Brown University.
- On 14 March 1991, Shevardnadze received an honorary degree from the University of Trieste in Italy.
- In 1991, Shevardnadze received an honorary degree from Emory University.
- In 1997, Shevardnadze received an honorary degree from Baku State University in Azerbaijan.
- In 1998, Shevardnadze received an honorary degree from Tbilisi State University in Georgia.
- In 1999, Shevardnadze received an honorary degree from the University of Jena in Germany.

=== Awards ===
I want to thank you for giving this award to President Shevardnadze. He has been a friend of the United States and a friend of ours. He has stood for democracy. You heard him tell the story tonight. He's like anybody who has converted; once he converted, he was really stuck as a true believer. He has endured assassination attempts, illegal coup attempts. He has been through ethnic difficulties in his own country. He has been through pressures from the outside and problems from the inside. He has watched the economy go down and things come apart and come back together again. But once he decided he believed [In Democracy], he stayed hitched, and he embodies something that I think we don't think about enough.
We talk a lot about what it takes to establish democracy. But once having established it, there are always people who will try to twist it to their own end, because we may eliminate communism from the world, but we have not eliminated lust for power or greed that leads to corruption or the hatreds and fears in the human heart that lead to the oppression of those who are different from us in race or religion or belong to some other minority group. This man has stayed the course when the price was high, and I thank you for awarding this to him tonight.

— Bill Clinton, at the NDI Dinner in 1999
- In 1993, Institute for East West Security Studies granted Shevardnadze with the award for his merit in ending cold war and liberation of the country.
- In July 1999, National Democratic Institute (NDI) awarded him with the W. Averell Harriman Democracy Award (now called Madeleine K. Albright Democracy Award) for merit in the field of democracy and human rights.
- On 2 July 1997, Onassis Foundation awarded Shevardnadze with its prize for International Understanding and Social Achievement.
- On 14 January 1998, a special prize of the Israeli Democracy Institute was awarded to Shevardnadze for special contribution to the democratic development of Georgia and his assistance to the return of Jews to their homeland in Israel during his term as USSR foreign minister.
- On 15 September 2000, UNESCO granted Shevardnadze with the Confucius Prize for Literacy.

== External links and sources ==
- BBC News obituary
- "Foes of Georgian Leader Storm Into Parliament Building" by Seth Mydans; The New York Times
- "Georgia revolt carried mark of Soros", MacKinnon, Mark; The Globe and Mail; 26 November 2003
- Georgian Interior Minister Vows to Enforce State of Emergency on the Voice of America News Web Site
- Inauguration of Eduard Shevardnadze; (2000)
- People power forces Georgia leader out from BBC News online
- Russians in Baden-Baden;
- Works by or about Eduard Shevardnadze at the Internet Archive
- Appearances on C-SPAN
- Eduard Shevardnadze at IMDb

Party political offices
Preceded by Vasil Mzhavanadze	First Secretary of the Georgian Communist Party; 1972–1985	Succeeded by Jumber Patiashvili
Political offices
Preceded by Andrey Gromyko	Minister of Foreign Affairs of the Soviet Union; 1985–1991	Succeeded by Aleksandr Bessmertnykh
Preceded by Boris Pankin (acting)	Minister of External Relations of the Soviet Union; 1991	Succeeded by None—position abolished
Preceded by Zviad Gamsakhurdia	President of Georgia; 1995–2003	Succeeded by Nino Burjanadze (acting)
