= Giorgi Targamadze =

Georgian politician

Giorgi Targamadze გიორგი თარგამაძე

leader of the Christian-Democratic Movement
- In office 8 February 2008 – April 2014

Leader of the Parliamentary Minority
- In office 7 June 2008 – 21 October 2012
- Succeeded by: Davit Bakradze
- Parliamentary group: Christian-Democrats

Member of the Parliament of Georgia
- In office 1999–2003
- Parliamentary group: Revival of Georgia

Personal details
- Born: November 22, 1973 (age 52) Tbilisi, Georgia
- Party: Christian-Democratic Movement (2008-2014)
- Education: Tbilisi State University

Giorgi Targamadze (Georgian: გიორგი თარგამაძე; born November 22, 1973, in Tbilisi) is a journalist and politician. He was the Leader of the Christian-Democratic Movement of Georgia from 2008 to 2014, which was the largest opposition party in parliament, second to the governing party, the United National Movement from 2008 to 2012. As such, he was Leader of the Parliamentary Minority.

In 2003–2008, he was a Public – Political Director of TV company "Imedi", and author and leader of analytic program "Droeba". In 1999–2003, he was a member of Georgian Parliament and the head of Faction "United Georgia".

== Career ==
Giorgi Targamadze was born on November 22, 1973. The day before St. George's Day. Because of it, his parents – Zhana Vacheishvili and Robert Targamadze decided to name newborn son – Giorgi. He received secondary education at public school N18, where he studied for eight grades. Then he continued his studies at Nikophore Irbakhi's Polygraph School.

In 1991–1999 he studied at Tbilisi State University, Faculty of Journalism. Before the start of the study, he was leading the youth program "vision", which influenced his professional choice.

Along with the acquisition of theoretical knowledge, he was leading the news program "Monitor" and analytical program "Digest- Monitor" at TV Company "Ibervizia" in 1991–1993;

- 1993-1995 – Head of TV- Radio Department of Adjara;
- 1995-1997 – Head of TV Company "Batumi";
- 1997-1999 – Press-Secretary of Supreme Council's Chairman of Autonomous Republic of Adjara;

== Politics ==
Due to country's political and social situation, at the age of 26, Giorgi Targamadze decided to actively involve in political processes. In 1999, he became the member of Parliament and the head of Faction "United Georgia." In 2002 he made the personal statement, left the Parliament and started working at the TV Company "Imedi".

In 2003 he returned to his journalistic activities. For 4 years he was working as a director of public-political programs at "Imedi." Simultaneously, he was the author and the leader of rating telecast "Droeba".

After the events of November 2007, Giorgi Targamadze and his friends left the journalism field and on St. David's Day, February 8, 2008, he founded a political party – Christian-Democratic Movement.

Headed by Giorgi Targamadze "Christian-Democratic Movement" took part in parliamentary elections in the May 2008. The party achieved success and political faction "Christian-Democrats" was established in legislative body.

In local elections of 2010 party has shown improved results and has taken the second place on country's scale. Nowadays, the "Christian – Democratic Movement" has its representatives in Georgian Parliament, as well as in all municipal councils in regions and towns.

Bidzina Ivanishvili, oligarch and leader of the Georgian Dream movement, stated publicly that he would not work with Targamadze's because of his "numerous suspicious moments".

== Teaching activities ==
In 1994–1999 he was delivering the lectures on fundamental principles of journalism at Adjara State University of Fine Arts. Since 2002, he has conducted the same course for the Tbilisi State University of Theatre and Film.

== Academic degree ==
In May 2011, Giorgi Targamadze was awarded Academic Degree of Doctor for social sciences. The dissertation is titled "Modern TV News – Journalism and Civil society". He defended it at Georgian Technical University.

== Family ==
Giorgi Targamadze is married to Tatia Topuria, who is an art critic by profession. They have two children- Tekla and Makine Targamadze.
