= Nino Burjanadze =

Georgian politician and lawyer (born 1964)

- ნინო ბურჯანაძე

Chairwoman of the Democratic Movement – United Georgia
- Incumbent
- Assumed office 23 November 2008
- Preceded by: Party established

Acting President of Georgia
- In office 25 November 2007 – 20 January 2008
- Prime Minister: Lado Gurgenidze
- Preceded by: Mikheil Saakashvili
- Succeeded by: Mikheil Saakashvili
- In office 23 November 2003 – 25 January 2004
- Prime Minister: Avtandil Jorbenadze; Zurab Zhvania
- Preceded by: Eduard Shevardnadze
- Succeeded by: Mikheil Saakashvili

3rd Speaker of the Parliament
- In office 9 November 2001 – 7 June 2008
- President: Eduard Shevardnadze; Herself (acting); Mikheil Saakashvili; Herself (acting); Mikheil Saakashvili
- Prime Minister: Giorgi Arsenishvili; Avtandil Jorbenadze; Zurab Zhvania; Mikheil Saakashvili (acting); Zurab Nogaideli; Giorgi Baramidze (acting); Lado Gurgenidze
- Preceded by: Zurab Zhvania
- Succeeded by: David Bakradze

Chairwoman of the United National Movement
- In office 2004 – May 2008
- Preceded by: Mikheil Saakashvili
- Succeeded by: David Bakradze

Member of the Parliament of Georgia
- In office 25 November 1995 – 7 June 2008

Personal details
- Born: 16 July 1964 (age 62) Kutaisi, Soviet Union (now Georgia)
- Party: Democratic Movement-United Georgia (2008–present)
- Other political affiliations: United National Movement (2003–2008); Burjanadze-Democrats (2002–2003); Union of Citizens of Georgia (1995–2002)
- Spouse: Badri Bitsadze
- Education: Tbilisi State University; Moscow State University

Nino Burjanadze (/niːˈnoʊ bɜːrdʒəˈnɑːdzeɪ/; Georgian: ნინო ბურჯანაძე [nino buɾdʒanadze]; born 16 July 1964) is a Georgian politician and lawyer who served as Chairperson of the Parliament of Georgia from November 2001 to June 2008. As the first woman, she served as the acting head of state of Georgia twice; the first time from 23 November 2003 to 25 January 2004 in the wake of Eduard Shevardnadze's resignation during the Rose Revolution, and again from 25 November 2007 to 20 January 2008, after Mikheil Saakashvili stepped down to run in the early presidential election. She withdrew into opposition to Saakashvili as the leader of the Democratic Movement – United Georgia party in 2008. In 2013, she ran in the presidential election, competing against 22 candidates; she ended third with 10 percent of the vote.

== Early life and career ==
Nino Burjanadze was born in Kutaisi, then-Soviet Georgia. She graduated in 1986 from the Faculty of Law of the Tbilisi State University (TSU). Afterwards, she pursued education at Moscow State University from which she graduated with a doctorate in International Law in 1990. In 1991, she became a docent (Associate Professor) of the Faculty of International Law at Tbilisi State University. At the same time, she worked as an expert consultant in international law for the Parliament of Georgia and the Ministry for Environment Protection and Natural Resources.

== Political career ==
In 1995, Burjanadze was elected to the Parliament of Georgia for the Union of Citizens of Georgia (UCG) then chaired by the President of Georgia Eduard Shevardnadze and supported financially by her father Anzor Burjanadze, a wealthy businessman. She first chaired the Parliamentary Committee for Constitutional Law from 1998 to 1999, and the Parliamentary Committee for International Relations from 2000 to 2001. During these years, she became known as a supporter of pro-Western values and a proponent of Georgia's integration with NATO and the European Union. She was closely allied with the reformist wing within the UCG led by Mikheil Saakashvili and Zurab Zhvania whom she succeeded on 9 November as parliamentary chairperson after Zhvania resigned on 1 November 2001.

Although she gave Shevardnadze strong support in his dealings with foreign countries (particularly with Russia), she spoke out forcefully against the corruption and inefficiency of his government's domestic policy, declaring it "absolutely incompetent." She left the UCG in 2002, forming an opposition party called the Burjanadze-Democrats to fight the November 2003 parliamentary elections.

After the rigged parliamentary elections of 2 November 2003, she joined other opposition leaders in denouncing the election results and urging mass demonstrations against Shevardnadze. The terms of the Georgian constitution automatically made her the acting president when Shevardnadze resigned on 23 November. This became known as the Rose Revolution. One of Burjanadze's first actions was to appeal for national unity and repeal the state of emergency declared by Shevardnadze, in an effort to restore stability to a country with a long history of political violence. She was an obvious candidate for the post, as she is widely respected by her compatriots - opinion polling in 2003 showed her to be one of Georgia's three most popular political figures.

On 4 January 2004, Mikhail Saakashvili won the pre-term presidential elections with an overwhelming majority. He was inaugurated on 25 January. A new parliament was elected on 28 March, with Burjanadze resuming her old post as Speaker on 22 April.

Following a political crisis in late 2007, Saakashvili called for new parliamentary and presidential elections for January 2008. In order to contest the presidential election, Saakashvili announced his resignation effective 25 November 2007, with Burjanadze becoming acting president for a second time (until the election returned Saakashvili to office on 20 January 2008).

Burjanadze was designated to lead the United National Movement party list for the parliamentary elections scheduled on 21 May 2008, but on 21 April she announced, in a surprise move, that she would not seek reelection due to a lack of consensus in the compilation of the National Movement's party list. Burjanadze's term as a parliamentary chairperson expired with the new legislature's inaugural session on 7 June 2008, when she was succeeded by David Bakradze.

In June 2008, Burjanadze announced she would set up a think tank that would serve as "a new form of being in politics." The organization — the Foundation for Democracy and Development (FDD) — was inaugurated in Tbilisi on 7 July 2008.

On 27 October 2008, in the aftermath of the 2008 South Ossetia war between Russia and Georgia, Burjanadze announced the establishment of "a clear-cut opposition party" called Democratic Movement–United Georgia.

On 28 November 2008, in an interview with Russia's Vesti news channel, Russia's NATO envoy Dmitry Rogozin accused the United States of planning to replace Saakashvili with Burjanadze as president of Georgia.

On 23 March 23, 2009, the Georgian interior ministry confirmed, that 10 of the activists from Burjanadze's party, Democratic Movement–United Georgia had been arrested. Burjanadze accused Saakashvili of arranging the arrests to intimidate the opposition. Burjanadze said the arrests marked the start of a "punitive campaign" by the government against the opposition, ahead of the mass protest planned for 9 April to demand Saakashvili's resignation.

=== 2011 protests ===
The protests led by Burjanadze began on 21 May 21, 2011 when over 10,000 Georgians attended a demonstration in Tbilisi demanding Georgian President Mikheil Saakashvili's resignation. In the southwestern town of Batumi some demonstrations also occurred with some protesters attempting to break into the television building. Nino Burjanadze has been a lead figure in the demonstrations. The protesters in Batumi briefly clashed with police. On 26 May at about 00:15, Georgian police began to suppress the protests with tear gas and rubber bullets. The following year, the ruling party lost parliamentary elections.

== Political positions ==
- Burjanadze's position, as it relates to, Soviet symbols is that they should not be banned as Georgian soldiers in the Red Army fought under Soviet symbols during World War II. In 2018, she said, "Half the world fought against the Nazis with Soviet symbols. Instead of banning them, the state should concentrate on today’s problems and stop acting like fools."

== Personal life ==
Burjanadze is married to Badri Bitsadze, the former head of the Department of Georgian State Border Defence, who stood down shortly after Burjanadze's political transformation. They have two sons. Aside from the Georgian language, she is fluent in Russian and English.

Political offices
Preceded by Zurab Zhvania	Speaker of Parliament; 2001–2008	Succeeded by Davit Bakradze
Preceded by Eduard Shevardnadze	President of Georgia; Acting; 2003–2004	Succeeded by Mikheil Saakashvili
Preceded by Mikheil Saakashvili	President of Georgia; Acting; 2007–2008	Succeeded by Mikheil Saakashvili
