= State Procurement Agency (Georgia) =

- სახელმწიფო შესყიდვების სააგენტო
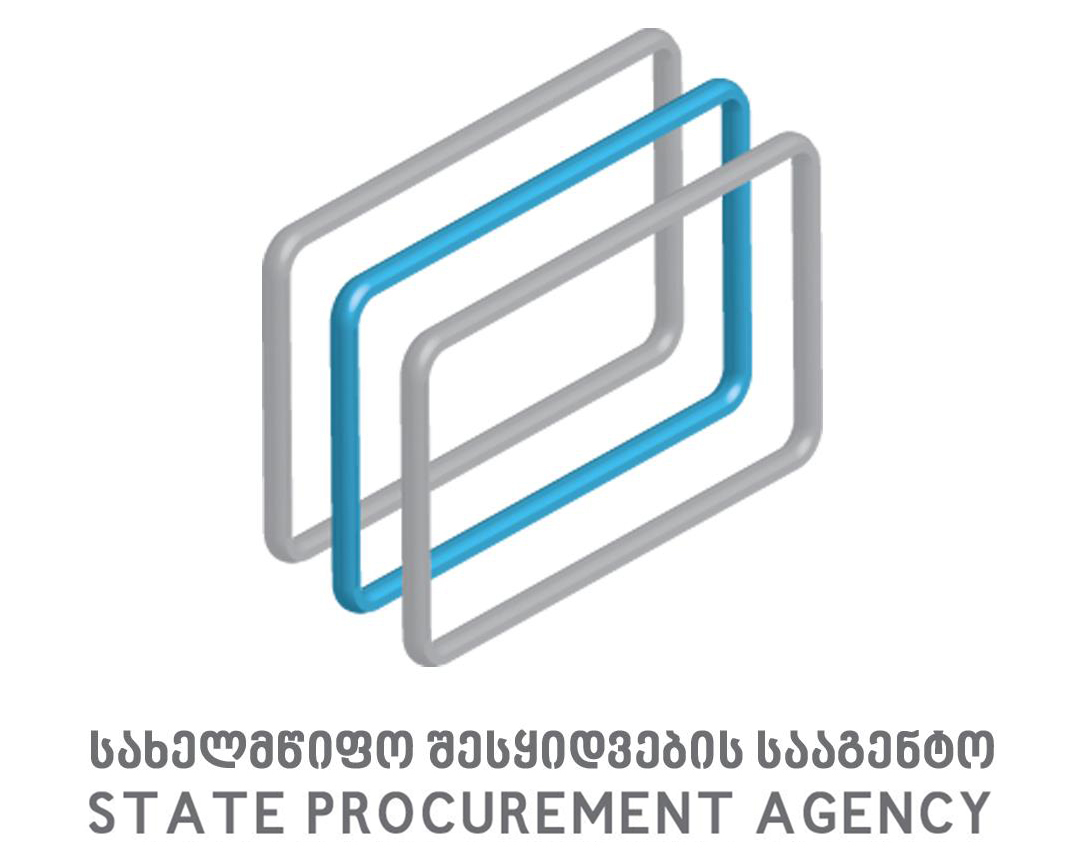
- Logo of the Agency

Agency overview
- Formed: 31 March 2014
- Preceding agency: Competition and State Procurement Agency
- Headquarters: 28, Pekini Ave., Tbilisi 0160, Georgia
- Agency executive: Levan Razmadze, Chairman
- Website: www.procurement.gov.ge

The State Procurement Agency (Georgian: სახელმწიფო შესყიდვების სააგენტო, sakhelmtsip’o shesqidvebis saagento) is an independent legal entity of public law (LEPL) in Georgia that provides oversight to ensure the legitimacy of government procurement procedures by establishing policies for the regulation of the procurement process.

The legal bases for the Agency's operations are the Constitution of Georgia, the Georgian Law on State Procurement, international agreements and treaties, and the Agency regulations developed in accordance with those laws and treaties.

The structure and regulations of the Agency are subject to approval by the Government of Georgia, which exercises state control over the Agency's activities.

== Establishment of the Agency ==
The current State Procurement Agency is the second instance of such an agency in Georgia.

Initially, an independent State Procurement Agency had been established in 2001 by Decree 223 of the President of Georgia. The agency with which it was soon to be linked, the Free Trade and Competition Agency, was created in 2010 by Decree 143 of the President of Georgia. These two agencies were then merged into the Competition and State Procurement Agency, which was established, on 1 January 2012, by Decree 829 of the President of Georgia.

A new, independent State Procurement Agency was created on 31 March 2014, following the amendments of 21 March 2014 to the Georgian Law on State Procurement, which split the Competition and State Procurement Agency into two independent legal entities, the other being the Competition Agency.

== Purpose, functions and rights of the Agency ==
=== Purpose of the Agency ===
The State Procurement Agency aims to achieve the purposes set by the Georgian Law on State Procurement. These purposes are:

- to ensure rational expenditure of funds designated for state procurement;
- to promote healthy competition in the supply of goods, rendering of services and performance of construction works necessary for the state;
- to ensure a fair and non-discriminatory approach to participants in state procurement;
- to ensure publicity for state procurement;
- to form the Unified Electronic System of State Procurement and build public confidence in it.

=== Functions of the Agency ===
The main Functions of the Agency are:

- to develop and pass by-laws to implement the law on State Procurement;
- to determine the policy for the regulation of the procurement process;
- to monitor and control the state procurement process;
- to study and analyze the procurement situation on a regular basis and submit suggestions to the Government of Georgia to assist it in making relevant decisions.

=== Rights of the Agency ===
The Agency is authorized to:

- control the process of state procurement;
- raise the question of the administrative liability of an official body for the violation of legislation on State Procurement;
- bring up before the relevant bodies the responsibility of the participants in the procurement, in cases of violation of the provisions of State Procurement laws.

== Chairman of the Agency ==
The Agency is supervised by its chairman, who is appointed and dismissed by the Prime Minister of Georgia.

The chairman:

- issues orders related to internal organizational matters, and also issues sub-legislative acts (orders), which are compulsory for procuring entities and other entities participating in procurement;
- handles the issues assigned under Agency administration;
- keeps an eye on the performance of their duties by personnel in Agency structural sub-units, and exercises control over employee performance according to the established rules;
- within his competence, appoints and dismisses Agency employees;
- administers Agency funds and controls their use;
- following established rules, submits recommendations to the Government of Georgia regarding matters assigned to Agency administration, so it may make relevant decisions.

== Structure of the Agency ==
The agency carries out its functions by means of its structural sub-units, whose functions are determined by Agency regulations.

Structural sub-units of the Agency are:

- Department of information technologies;
- Monitoring department;
- Legal department;
- Administrative department;
- Analytical group.

=== Dispute resolution board ===
To ensure full equity and transparency of state procurement procedures, the Procurement Related Disputes Resolution Board was created on 6 December 2010. The purpose of the review of procurement related disputes is to resolve them swiftly and fairly, based on the principle of the equal rights of the parties.

The Board consists of six members. The Board is made up of representatives of the State Procurement Agency and the NGO sector (civil society), based on the parity principle. The Board is chaired by the Chairman of the State Procurement Agency. The Chairman of the Agency appoints two members of the Board from among Agency employees. Three representatives of the NGO sector (civil society) are selected by as many representatives of the NGO sector as possible, to serve as members of the Board in rotation, for a one-year term, and the list of selected members is submitted to the secretariat of the Board.

An entity interested in participating in procurement, or a participant, may appeal actions of a procurement entity or a tender committee to the board, if it feels that during the procurement the rules set forth in the present law and relevant normative acts were violated and/or its rights were otherwise infringed.

== The Unified Electronic System of State Procurement ==
The Unified Electronic System of State procurement is the official online portal of state procurement in Georgia. It is meant to ensure an open, transparent and competitive environment for any participant in state procurement.

The Agency has been intensively working about a year to implement this electronic procurement system. It has been implemented with the technical assistance of the National Agency of Public Registry of Georgia. The relevant legal framework has been elaborated, the electronic tender software developed, and many other measures implemented that were necessary for the sustainable and safe operation of the system.

The system practically precludes corruption, increases the confidence and involvement of the society in state procurement, ensures fair competition, facilitates rational disbursement of administrative and financial resources, and saves time and money.

== Awards ==
- On 12 November 2010, the Unified System of State Procurement was recognized as the best IT innovation at the Georgian ICT Development and Cyber Security Conference.
- On 4 May 2012, the Georgian Electronic Government Procurement (Ge-GP) System was recognized as one of the best in the category – "Preventing and Combating Corruption in Public Service".

== Legislation ==
- Georgian Law on State Procurement
- The orders of the chairman of the State Procurement Agency
