= 2024 Georgian presidential election =

- 14 December 2024

300 members of the Electoral Assembly 200 electoral votes needed to win
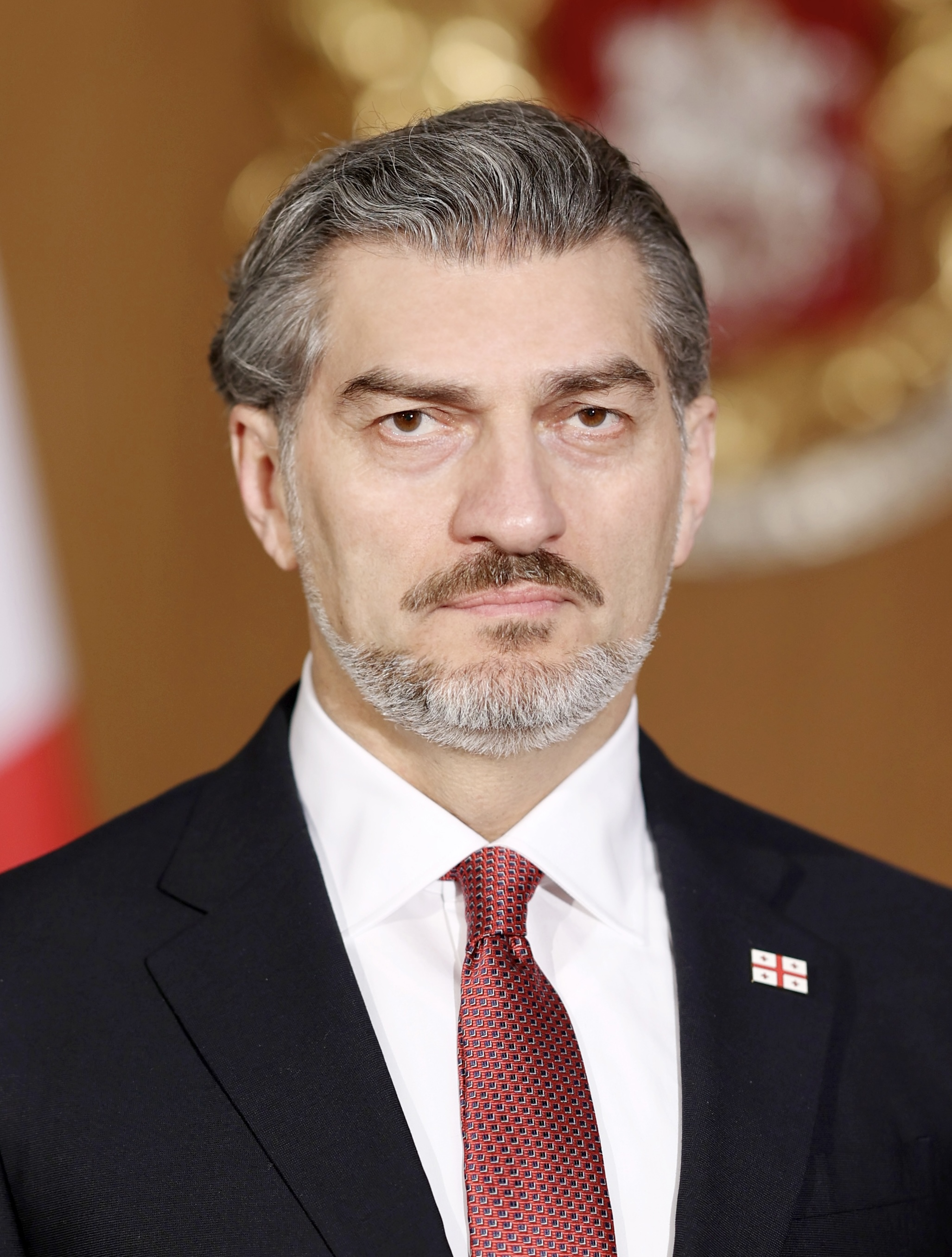
Candidate	Mikheil Kavelashvili
Party	People's Power
Electoral vote	224 (Note: The vote was boycotted by all opposition parties, who have renounced their parliamentary mandates in protest of the 2024 Georgian parliamentary election which they assessed as fraudulent.)
Percentage	100%
Nominator	Georgian Dream
President before election
Salome Zourabichvili
Independent
Elected President
Mikheil Kavelashvili
People's Power

Presidential elections were held in Georgia on 14 December 2024. Following amendments to the constitution and Georgia's transition to the parliamentary republic in 2017, which led to the drastic reduction to the presidential powers, this was the first indirect vote where the president was elected by a 300-member Electoral Assembly composed of the parliamentary, local and regional representatives. Ruling party nominated candidate Mikheil Kavelashvili was elected by 224 electoral votes.

Due to opposition boycott, the 2024 presidential election was the first in the history of Georgia to have only one candidate from only one party on the ballot, a drastic reduction from 65 candidates at the previous presidential election in 2018. The election was widely disputed and regarded as illegitimate by the opposition, largely due to allegations of electoral fraud associated with the concurrent parliamentary elections. These allegations triggered widespread unrest and contributed to a broader political crisis in the country. Salome Zourabichvili, along with opposition parties and some of the international community, such as the European Parliament, refused to recognize the election of Kavelashvili as legitimate President of Georgia.

== Background ==
=== Revision of presidential powers ===
The powers of the president have been limited as a result of the 2017 constitutional reform and Georgia's transition to the parliamentary model of government. The president no longer has power to conduct international negotiations with foreign countries. The president has reduced powers in wartime, as a decision on the use of the defence forces is to be made solely by the prime minister and it is be necessary for the president to obtain the prime minister's consent to declare martial law or a state of emergency; moreover, the National Defence Council – a consultative body to the president – has lost its permanent status, only be convened in times of martial law. Although the President formally remained the head of state, the commander-in-chief, and representative in foreign relations, his/her role no longer included ensuring "the functioning of state bodies within the scope of the powers granted by the Constitution". The President has also lost the right "to request particular matters to be discussed at the Government session and participate in the discussion."

Under a law passed in February 2024, the Speaker of Parliament, instead of the president, nominates and opens the competition for the election of the Chairman of the Central Election Commission (CEC) and its professional members. Parliament requires a three-fifths supermajority (90 votes) in the first round to elect candidates. If unsuccessful, a simple majority (76 votes) can be used in the next round, with two attempts allowed. If both attempts fail, the president gains the authority to appoint the CEC chairperson/member. The law also stipulates that CEC members serve a full five-year term, even if elected with a lower quorum.

=== Presidency of Salome Zourabichvili ===
Despite being endorsed by the ruling Georgian Dream (GD) party during the 2018 presidential election and subsequently winning it, outgoing president Salome Zourabichvili has distanced herself from the governing party in the following years, which led to the President's inter-institutional conflict with the Second Garibashvili government and the Parliament. In at least two occasions, the Government banned the President from traveling abroad, preventing her from visiting Ukraine, Poland, Germany, and France. In March 2023, the Government announced it would file two lawsuits with the Constitutional Court against the President over her decision to go on an unauthorized visit to Brussels and Paris and over her refusal to sign outright decrees appointing ambassador candidates nominated by the Government, before dismissing the lawsuits several months later. Zourabichvili has increasingly used her veto power against the Parliament, including vetoing bills changing the composition of the National Bank of Georgia, and extending the scope and time limits for covert investigations, amongst other bills, most notably the 'foreign agents' bill.

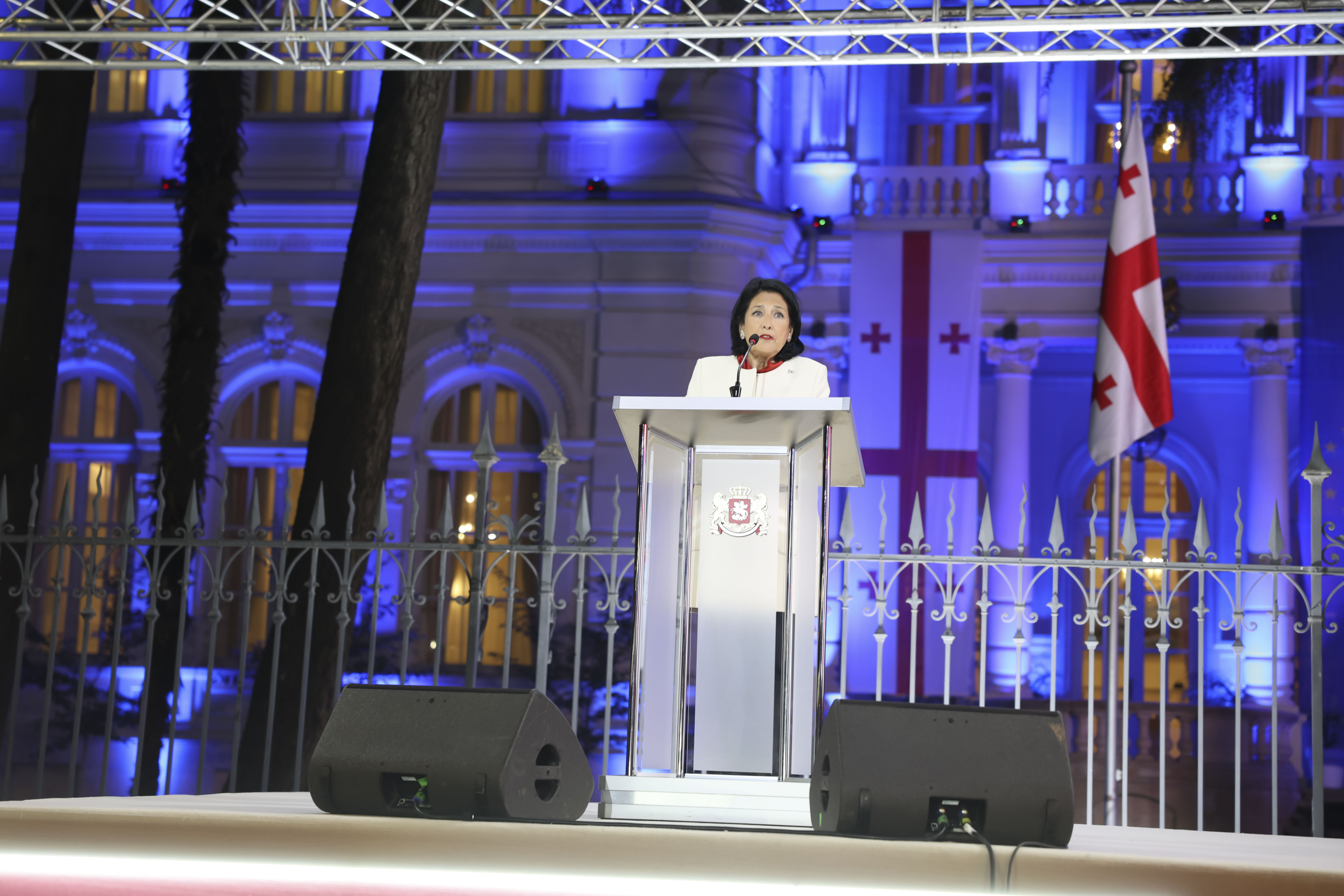
President Salome Zourabichvili gives speech in the Orbeliani Palace, May 2024.

GD tried impeaching Zourabichvili with no success on 18 October 2023, when the Parliament failed to collect the 100 votes needed to impeach her. In October 2024, the inter-institutional conflict escalated between the President and the Government. The President characterized the 2024 Georgian parliamentary election, which resulted in the Georgian Dream party’s victory, as "fraudulent" and deemed the newly elected parliament "illegitimate". She supported the post-election opposition protests and asserted her intention to remain president until new parliamentary elections were held upon the expiration of her term in December 2024. In response, the new prime minister, Irakli Kobakhidze, stated that the President would be compelled to resign.

== Electoral system ==
=== 2017 Constitutional changes ===
On 26 September 2017, the Parliament of Georgia adopted the constitutional amendments, which went into effect in December 2018, after the inauguration of Salome Zourabichvili as president. As a result of the constitutional reform, the direct election of the president by popular vote was abolished and replaced by a system of indirect election through an 300-member Electoral Assembly, including all 150 MPs, all 20 representatives from the Supreme Council of the Abkhazian Autonomous Republic, all 21 members from the Supreme Council of the Autonomous Republic of Adjara, and 109 electors representing self-governance bodies, allocated to the parties in proportion to their support received in the local elections. The new electoral system is in place for this election and onwards. The president is elected without prior debate on the Parliament floor through open ballot.

The president will serve for a term of five years and can serve maximum two terms. The eligibility age for the president increased from 35 to 40. The residence requirements changed as well: a presidential candidate has to have lived in Georgia for at least 15 years. However, a candidate is no longer required to have lived in Georgia for the last three years before the election.

=== Composition of the Electoral Assembly ===
A group of at least 30 electors is required to nominate the presidential candidate to the Electoral Assembly. Each elector is entitled to nominate and vote for only one candidate. 200 votes are required to elect the President. However, if no nominee manages to secure 200 votes, a second round is held between 2 candidates with the most votes. In the second round the candidate who gains more votes than the other one is declared as winner.

==== Original ====
Delegation	GD	U–NM	FG	CfC	SG	APG	GLP	Independent	Total
Local representatives	54	39 (Note: United National Movement got 36 electors, while European Georgia got 2 and Strategy Aghmashenebeli — 1.)	9	1 (Note: 1 elector from Girchi – More Freedom.)	4 (Note: 4 electors from Lelo for Georgia.)	1	1	0	109
Abkhazia	0	0	0	0	0	0	0	20 (Note: Deputies of Georgian Parliament elected from Abkhazia during the 1992 Georgian general election and the members of the Supreme Council of the Abkhaz Autonomous Republic elected during the 1991 Abkhazian elections before the 1992–1993 separatist conflict have their seats reserved permanently before the new elections in the region to be held after restoration of Georgia's territorial integrity.)	20
Adjara	13	4	2	1	1	0	0	0	21
Parliament	89	16	12	19	14	0	0	0	150
Total	156	59	23	21	19	1	1	20	300

==== Final ====
In accordance with the opposition protests against the results of the 2024 Georgian parliamentary election and the parliamentary boycott by opposition parties, there were no local representatives or participants from the opposition in this election. Due to the opposition refusing to nominate its 55 local representatives to the Electoral Assembly, these seats went to the Georgian Dream party, which allowed to increase its representation to 211 seats.

Additionally, two members of the Supreme Council of the Autonomous Republic of Abkhazia joined the opposition boycott.

Delegation	GD	CfC	U–NM	SG	FG	APG	GLP	Independent	Total
Local representatives	109	0	0	0	0	0	0	0	109
Abkhazia	0	0	0	0	0	0	0	20	20
Adjara	13	1	4	1	2	0	0	0	21
Parliament	89	19	16	14	12	0	0	0	150
Total	211	20	20	15	14	0	0	20	300

Date

On 26 November 2024, the Parliament of Georgia set the date of the election to 14 December.

== Candidates ==
On 27 November 2024, the ruling Georgian Dream nominated Mikheil Kavelashvili, a former footballer and co-founder of People’s Power, as its candidate for the Presidency of Georgia.

Bidzina Ivanishvili, the party’s honorary chair, personally presented Kavelashvili as the nominee, emphasizing his distinguished career. Ivanishvili highlighted Kavelashvili’s achievements as a footballer who represented Georgia with honor, playing for Dinamo Tbilisi, Alania Vladikavkaz, Manchester City, and top Swiss clubs. He also described Kavelashvili’s habitus as embodying the ideal Georgian man, a principled patriot, devoted husband, and proud father of four.

Kavelashvili lacks a higher education degree, which barred him from running for Georgian Football Federation presidency in 2015. Mamuka Mdinaradze, Executive Secretary of GD, defended Kavelashvili's qualifications, arguing that love for one's country and basic competencies don't require a diploma, noting that many constitutions, including Georgia's, don't mandate higher education for public office. Mdinaradze criticized past leaders with degrees for failing to develop the country and expressed confidence in Kavelashvili as a non-partisan leader who would prioritize Georgia's interests, unify the nation, and avoid serving foreign agendas.

The nomination of Kavelashvili as the ruling party's presidential candidate has sparked strong criticism from opposition figures, who accuse the party's leadership of undermining democracy and disrespecting the Georgian people. Critics argue that the nomination discredits the country's democratic institutions, damages its relationships with the West, and label him as the "most prominent anti-Westerner." Some have also questioned Kavelashvili's qualifications and education, accusing the ruling party of pushing a divisive agenda that risks further isolating Georgia from its Western allies. Additionally, the opposition challenges the legitimacy of the parliamentary composition and the planned presidential election, with some describing it as unconstitutional and a betrayal of Georgian democratic traditions.

In response to these critiques, Salome Zourabichvili condemned the planned election as "illegitimate" and "unconstitutional," calling it a "travesty" with "no connection to any political process." She argued that the election was an insult to Georgian traditions, history, and culture, deeming it "unacceptable."

Due to the opposition parties' boycott of the parliamentary election results, no candidates were nominated by parties other than Georgian Dream, leaving Kavelashvili as the sole candidate for the presidency.

== Results ==
211 electors from the Georgian Dream and 14 from the Supreme Council of the Abkhazian Autonomous Republic participated in the election. All supported the candidacy of Mikheil Kavelashvili, except the Supreme Council of Abkhazia member Ada Marshania. She criticized the electors and declared she would not vote for Kavelashvili. Her vote was counted as invalid.

Candidate	Party	Votes	%
Mikheil Kavelashvili	People's Power	224	100.00
Total		224	100.00
Valid votes		224	99.56
Invalid/blank votes		1	0.44
Total votes		225	100.00
Registered voters/turnout		300	75.00
Source: CNN, Civil.ge

== Reactions ==
=== Domestic ===
- Incumbent President Salome Zourabichvili refused to leave office and called for consultations for a new election. Prime Minister Irakli Kobakhidze said, a week before the new presidential inauguration, that Zourabichvili "will have to leave office on December 29. Let us see where she continues to live - beyond the bars or behind the bars," suggesting that her "actions could violate the Criminal Code." On 27 December, Zourabichvili stated again that the presidential election was invalid and that she would remain President. Zourabichvili reiterated her position on the day of Kavelashvili's inauguration on 29 December, calling the event a "parody". However, in order to avoid violence, Zourabichvili complied with the ruling party and voluntarily left Orbeliani Palace on the morning of the inauguration of Mikheil Kavelashvili, on 29 December 2024. She stated that she remains president, and will take the flag and her legitimacy with her: "This building doesn’t belong to anyone, this building was a symbol while the President, who was legitimate, sat here. I’m taking away the legitimacy, I’m taking away the flag, I’m taking away what is your trust".
- Both living former presidents of Georgia, Giorgi Margvelashvili and Mikheil Saakashvili, have declared that Zourabichvili remains the legitimate president of Georgia until a legitimate replacement can be elected.
- According to state media, Patriarch of Georgia Ilia II allegedly congratulated Kavelashvili on his election as President and wished him success. However, in the post-election period pro-government media also disseminated other content attributed to the Patriarch, which the Patriach's office later admitted was fake.

=== International ===
==== Favorable ====
- Belarus: President Alexander Lukashenko congratulated Kavelashvili on his election as president, expressing confidence that renewed cooperation between Belarus and Georgia would strengthen bilateral relations.
- Armenia: Prime Minister Nikol Pashinyan and President Vahagn Khachaturyan both congratulated Kavelashvili on his election as president.
- Azerbaijan: President Ilham Aliyev congratulated Kavelashvili on his election as president, expressing confidence in strengthening the bilateral ties between the two countries.
- Serbia: President Aleksandar Vučić congratulated Kavelashvili on his election as President and extended an invitation for him to visit Serbia.
- Turkey: President Recep Tayyip Erdoğan congratulated Kavelashvili on his election as president, expressing confidence that Turkey and Georgia will develop their relations.
- China: President Xi Jinping congratulated Kavelashvili on his election as President and called it a positive event for the development of China–Georgia relations.
- Kazakhstan: President Kassym-Jomart Tokayev sent a letter to Kavelashvili, extending New Year greetings and expressing his "best wishes for a joyous and prosperous 2025".
- Hungary: President Tamás Sulyok congratulated Kavelashvili on his election as president. Sulyok emphasized that "Hungary firmly supports the territorial integrity and sovereignty of Georgia and the country's European integration efforts".
- Russia: Leonid Slutsky, Chairman of the Russia State Duma Committee on International Affairs, praised Kavelashvili's election, stating that "Georgia confidently passes the test of sovereignty and independence. Mikhail Kavelashvili has officially assumed the office". Slutsky disparaged Zourabichvili as a "Western proxy" and expressed satisfaction that "Georgians learnt well the lessons of the Ukrainian Maidan and did not allow their country to be turned into another Western colony..."

==== Unfavorable ====
- Council of Europe: On 29 January 2025, the Parliamentary Assembly of the Council of Europe stripped Georgia's ruling party of privileges, including the right to observe elections, and threatened to deny them accreditation entirely unless new, fair elections are scheduled and political prisoners released by April 2025. Unhappy with the decision, Georgia's ruling party representatives described it as "blackmail" and announced in protest that they would cease working in the Assembly.
- European Union: By a vote of 400 in favor and 63 against, the European Parliament declared that it "refuses to recognise the self-proclaimed authorities of the ruling Georgian Dream party following the rigged parliamentary elections on 26 October 2024, including the newly appointed President Mikheil Kavelashvili...MEPs continue to recognise Salome Zourabichvili as Georgia’s legitimate president". The Parliament further declared that it "considers Georgia as a state captured by the illegitimate Georgian Dream regime" and called for widereaching sanctions against the illegitimate regime. Earlier, the European Parliament also overwhelmingly rejected the 2024 election of the Georgian parliament, which subsequently elected Kavelashvili. The European People's Party, the largest party in the EU, described Kavelashvili's election as "devoid of democratic legitimacy" and called to "Recognise Salome Zourabishvili as the legitimate President of Georgia and the sole legitimate representative of Georgia in international relations..." The Alliance of Liberals and Democrats for Europe Party also explicitly refused to recognize Kavelashvili as president: "The recent one-party election orchestrated by the Georgian Dream (GD) party, culminating in the appointment of the only candidate - Mikheil Kavelashvili as their ‘president,’ represents a clear violation of democratic norms and an affront to the will of the Georgian people...We reaffirm our unwavering support for Salome Zourabichvili as the legitimate President of Georgia, and do not recognise Mikheil Kavelashvili as president..."
- Estonia: By a vote of 59 in favor and 9 against, the Estonian Parliament strongly rejected the legitimacy of the entire Georgian Dream leadership, stating that it "does not recognise the legitimacy of the Georgian parliament, government, or President who have all been appointed as a consequence of the parliamentary elections that took place in an atmosphere of underhand activities and intimidation of citizens". The Estonian Parliament furthermore "recognises Salome Zourabichvili as the legitimate President".
- France: President of France Emmanuel Macron has stated that Russia was involved in "falsifying" election results in Georgia and that new elections should be pursued as a way out of the crisis. He subsequently received Salome Zourabichvili at the Élysée Palace with full honors despite her original term supposedly expiring the preceding year.
- Lithuania: President Gitanas Nausėda questioned the legitimacy of Kavelashvili's election by Georgian Dream, stating: "...no one can take the "dream party" seriously, and a person, only elected and acknowledged by his own party, is inaugurated in a semi-secret ceremony...Georgia must either be redefining democracy or skipping the whole parliament and president thing altogether..."
- United States: Joe Wilson, Chairman of the Commission on Security and Cooperation in Europe and Republican U.S congressman, stated that Zourabichvili remains the legitimate president of Georgia, adding that "she stands against the illegitimate government trying to foist a Russian puppet president on Georgians." On 26 December Wilson wrote on X that "President Donald Trump has made it very clear where he stands on the self-professed enemies of America. If Bidzina Ivanishvili goes through with his plan to destroy Georgian democracy on December 29, he should expect a response like he's never imagined." Roger Wicker, Chairman of the United States Senate Committee on Armed Services, called on the Biden administration to sanction leaders of the Georgian Dream party and expressed concern that unless urgent action is taken the "Georgian Dream party could actually forcibly remove the democratically elected President of Georgia from power." He added that "Vladimir Putin would like to have Georgia back...willing to rig elections to have his agents brutally repress the peaceful protests..."
