= Constitution of Georgia =

Constitution of Georgia may refer to:

- Constitution of Georgia (country), the governing document of Georgia, a nation in the Caucasus region of eastern Europe and western Asia
- Constitution of Georgia (U.S. state), the governing document of the U.S. state of Georgia
