= Dimitri Khundadze =

Georgian doctor and politician (born 1968)

- დიმიტრი ხუნდაძე

Member of the Parliament of Georgia
- Incumbent
- Assumed office 1 October 2012

Personal details
- Born: October 30, 1968 (age 57) Mtskheta, Georgian SSR, Soviet Union (now Georgia)
- Political party: Georgian Dream (2012-2022); People's Power (2022-present)
- Education: Tbilisi Medical Academy

Dimitri Khundadze (Georgian: დიმიტრი ხუნდაძე; born 1968) is a Georgian physician and politician who has served in the Parliament of Georgia since 2012, as a member of Georgian Dream and People's Power.

== Early life and education ==
Dimitri Khundadze was born in Mtskheta, Georgian SSR, Soviet Union, on 30 November 1968. He graduated from Tbilisi Medical Academy with a pediatrics degree in 1996, and conducted postgraduate studies at the Department of the State Medical Academy from 1996 to 2001.

At Mtskheta District Hospital Khundadze was a surgical receptionist from 1985 to 1987, He was in compulsory military service from 1987 to 1989. He was a resident physician at S. Khechinashvili University Clinic from 2001 to 2012.

== Career ==
In the 2012 election Khundadze won a seat in the Parliament of Georgia as a member of Georgian Dream (GD). During his tenure in parliament he served on the Sectoral Economy and Economic Policy, and Regional Policy and Self-Government committees. He was chair of the Health Care and Social Issues committee from 2012 to 2016, and 2019 to 2020.

On 28 June 2022, Khundadze left GD alongside Mikheil Kavelashvili and Sozar Subari. He was one of the eight parliamentarians who formed People's Power as a registered political party on 18 March 2024.

== Political position ==
Khundadze was critical of the rules for Georgia's candidacy to join the European Union and that the dignity of Georgia was worth more than EU candidacay. Eurasianet stated that he was one of four members of parliament pushing anti-western conspiracy theories.

== Works cited ==
=== News ===
- "People's Power Officially Registers Political Party". Civil Georgia. 18 March 2024. Archived from the original on 28 June 2025.
- "PM's EU Remarks Defy Constitution, CSOs Say". Civil Georgia. 13 June 2022. Archived from the original on 28 June 2025.
- "Three Georgian Dream MPs Step Outside Party, Faction". Civil Georgia. 28 June 2022. Archived from the original on 28 June 2025.
- Gabritchidze, Nini (31 August 2022). "The four horsemen of Georgia's anti-Western conspiracy". Eurasianet. Archived from the original on 28 June 2025.

=== Web ===
- "დიმიტრი ხუნდაძე". Biographical Dictionary of Georgia. Archived from the original on 28 June 2025.
