= Elections in Georgia (country) =

The single-chamber Parliament of Georgia has 150 members, elected for a four-year term through elections. The last presidential elections were held in October 2018 due to constitutional changes taking effect in 2024, after which the president will be elected for a five-year term by a parliamentary college of electors. The series of constitutional changes, initiated in 2017, stipulated a one-time transitional presidential term of six years for 2018–2024. Other major systemic changes included a move to a fully proportional system by 2024 with a 5% threshold.

== Electoral system ==
Electoral reforms were called for in the 2000s, following the 2003 Rose Revolution.

At the time of the 2017 constitutional change, the 150-seat Georgian parliament was elected through a mixed system of 77 seats by proportional representation (5% threshold) and 73 single-seat majoritarian constituencies. The pressure for a change to a more proportional system started after the 2016 parliamentary election when ruling Georgian Dream garnered 115 out of 150 seats, clearing the constitutional majority of 75%, while it had an overall vote share of 48.7%. Their parliamentary supermajority was driven by winning 71 out of 73 majoritarian constituencies. Ruling Georgian Dream MPs, parliamentary and extra-parliamentary opposition, legal experts and civil society organizations became member of the State Commission at the end of 2016, which was tasked with drafting constitutional reform.

The reforms proposed a change to a fully proportional system for 2020, among other things, but during the process in 2017 ruling Georgian Dream unilaterally changed the constitutional proposals by postponing the electoral transition an election cycle to 2024, inciting national and international criticism. This remained a divisive issue in the following years. In summer 2019 protests in Georgia demanded once more a change to a fully proportional system for the 2020 Georgian parliamentary election which secured a promise from Georgian Dream party leader Bidzina Ivanishvili to do so. In November 2019, however, individual members of parliament voted against a bill to change the electoral system, sparking renewed protests. This eventually led to a political crisis in which EU and U.S. mediated.

The election code was changed for the 2020 elections to a mixed system of 120 proportional (1% threshold, lowered from a one-off 3%) and 30 single-seat majoritarian constituencies. It also barred any party to claim a majority of seats in the Parliament if they receive less than 40% of votes. The 2020 elections were swiftly won by ruling Georgian Dream, under strong protest of the opposition which claimed the elections were rigged, sparking yet another political crisis. The opposition MPs refused to take up their parliamentary mandates. European mediation efforts eventually led in April 2021 to an agreement between opposition and governing parties, which most importantly stipulated snap elections if the ruling Georgian Dream party would garner less than 43% of the vote in the October 2021 local elections, among other electoral reforms and power-sharing conditions. Most parties signed the agreement, and elected opposition MPs took up their parliamentary mandate, which they had refused until then. Ruling Georgian Dream however withdrew from the agreement two months before the October 2021 local elections.

The 2024 Georgian presidential election was the first indirect election of the President of Georgia by electoral college following changes to the Constitution of Georgia in 2017.

== Statistics ==
Since 1990, there have been 33 elections conducted in Georgia, of which eight have been presidential, ten have been parliamentary, eight have been Supreme Council of Adjara, and seven have been local; there has also been one referendum and one plebiscite. The highest recorded number of eligible voters (3,594,810) participated in the presidential elections held on May 26, 1991; on the same occasion, the highest numeric turnout was recorded with 2,978,247 voters. The largest number of observers (1848 international and 13,195 local organizations) were registered by the CEC for parliamentary elections on May 21, 2008.

=== First multiparty elections ===
The first independent multiparty elections in Georgia were held on October 28, 1990. Still the Soviet Republic, Georgia was firmly on its way to independence. The Soviet dictate, with its harsh rule, was about to end, illustrated by the first time multiparty elections were conducted.

Fourteen political parties registered for these elections, which were held with a mixed system. The Supreme Council elected 250 (125 proportional, 125 majoritarian) MPs for five years. The total number of voters was 3444 thousand, 67% participated in these elections. Only four parties crossed the threshold and only two parties received mandates under the proportional system:

1. "Round Table-Free Georgia" (81 MPs)
2. The Communist Party of Georgia (44 MPs)

In the majoritarian system, the places were distributed as follows:

1. "Round Table-Free Georgia" (43 MPs)
2. Competition (17 MPs)
3. People's Front (11 MPs)
4. "Democratic Georgia" (2 MPs)
5. Rustaveli Society (1 MP)

As a result of the advice, "Round Table – Free Georgia" came to power. Electoral commissions of political unions, public associations and organizations, labor collectives, secondary special and higher education institutions of citizens of the Republic of Georgia contributed to the elections. The rest of the rules of holding the parliamentary elections were determined by the law of the Republic of Georgia.

=== First presidential elections ===
On April 14, 1991, the presidential regime was introduced into Georgia. The elections were deemed to be conducted in case of participation of the majority of total number of voters. Candidates who were supported by more than 50% of the total number of voters were deemed elected. Six candidates participated in these elections:

1. Zviad Gamsakhurdia – 2,565,362 votes.
2. Valerian Advadze – 240,243 votes.
3. Jemal Mikeladze – 51,717 votes.
4. Nodar Natadze – 36,266 votes.
5. Irakli Shengelia – 26,886 votes.
6. Tamaz Kvachantiradze – 8,553 votes

Zviad Gamsakhurdia became the first president of independent Georgia. The total number of voters was recorded at 3,594,810. The number of voters who participated in the elections was recorded at 2,978,247.

== See also ==
- Elections in Abkhazia
- Elections in South Ossetia
- Electoral calendar
- Electoral system
