= Georgian Electoral Assembly =

In Georgia, the Electoral Assembly or the Electoral College (Georgian: საარჩევნო კოლეგია, romanized: saarchevno k'olegia) is the group of presidential electors that is formed every five years during the presidential election for the purpose of voting for the president. This process was introduced by the 2017 constitutional amendment project. The Electoral Assembly is made up of parliamentary, local and regional representatives. Its members are entitled to nominate the presidential candidates and vote for one of them.

== Composition ==
The Electoral Assembly was introduced with the transition of Georgia to the parliamentary system of governance to replace direct presidential election with the indirect one. According ot the Article 50 of the Constitution of Georgia, the Electoral Assembly consists of 300 members, including all 150 members of the Parliament of Georgia, all 20 representatives from the Supreme Council of the Abkhazian Autonomous Republic, all 21 members from the Supreme Council of the Autonomous Republic of Adjara, and 109 electors representing self-government bodies, allocated to the political parties in proportion to their support received in the latest local elections.

Delegation	Votes
Parliament of Georgia	150
Abkhazia	20
Adjara	21
Self-government bodies	109
Total	300

== Election process ==
A group of at least 30 electors is required to nominate the presidential candidate to the Electoral College. Each elector is entitled to nominate and vote for only one candidate. 200 votes are required to elect the President. However, if no nominee manages to secure 200 votes, a second round is held between 2 candidates with the most votes. In the second round the candidate who gains more votes than the other one is declared as winner. The president is elected without prior debate on the Parliament floor through open ballot. The election date is set by the Parliament of Georgia and it is administrated by the Central Election Commission of Georgia. The electoral process takes place in the Palace of the Parliament of Georgia.

== History ==
The constitutional amendments introducing the Electoral Assembly went into force during the 2024 Georgian presidential election. The Electoral Assembly convened on 14 December 2024 and elected Mikheil Kavelashvili as the 6th President of Georgia with the support of 211 electors from the ruling Georgian Dream and 13 from the Supreme Council of the Abkhazian Autonomous Republic.

== See also ==
- United States Electoral College
- Federal Convention (Germany)
- Election Committee (Hong Kong)
- Electoral College (India)
- Electoral College (Pakistan)
