= Mikheil Kavelashvili =

Georgian politician (born 1971)

- მიხეილ ყაველაშვილი
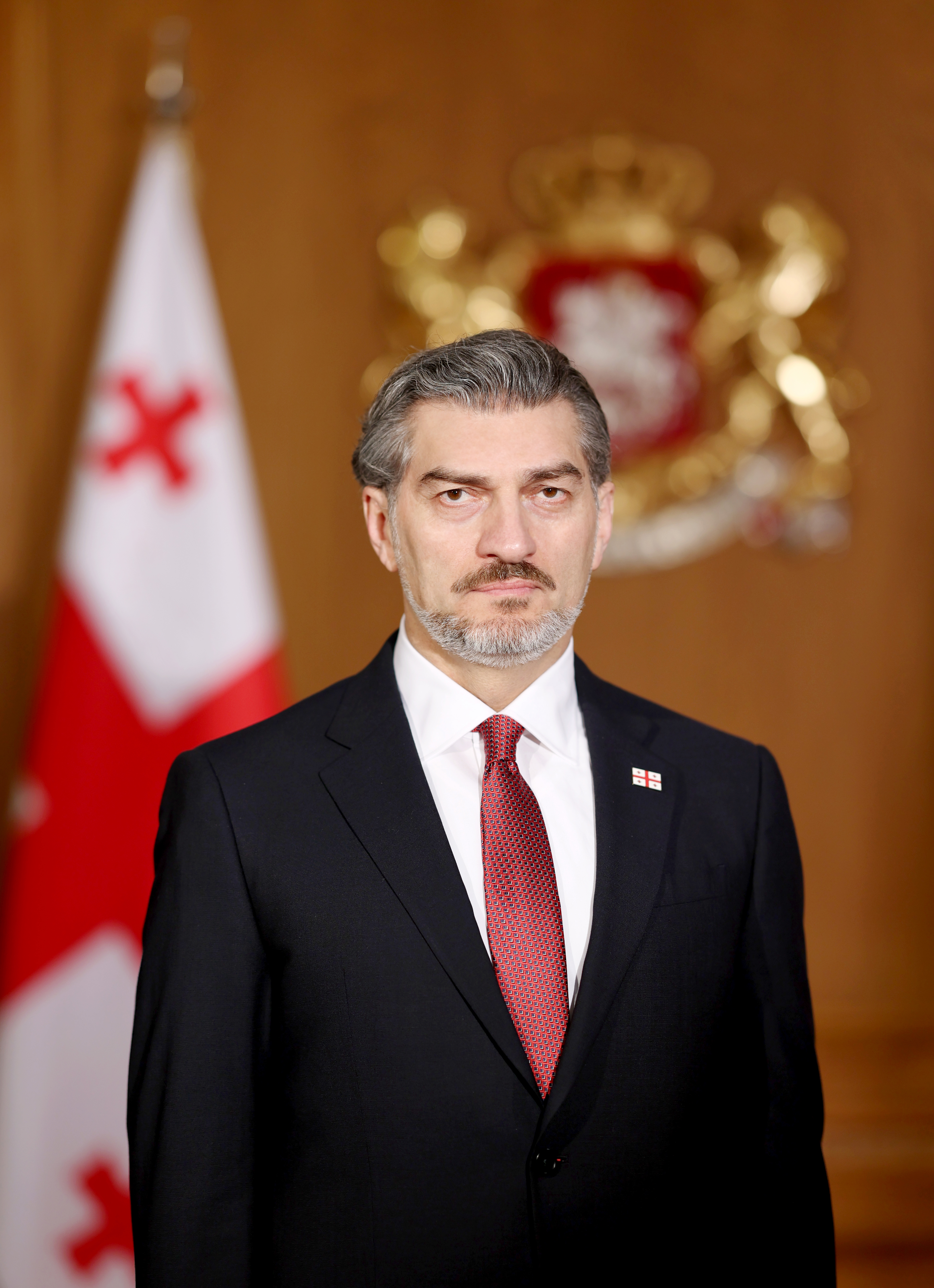
- Official portrait, 2025

6th President of Georgia
- Disputed (Note: Kavelashvili's election as President is contested by outgoing President Salome Zourabichvili, all large opposition parties, and significant parts of the international community.)
- Assumed office 29 December 2024
- Prime Minister: Irakli Kobakhidze
- Preceded by: Salome Zourabichvili

Member of the Parliament of Georgia
- In office 18 November 2016 – 10 December 2024

Personal details
- Born: 22 July 1971 (age 55) Bolnisi, Georgian SSR, Soviet Union
- Party: People's Power (2022–present)
- Other political affiliations: Georgian Dream (2016–2022)
- Spouse: Tamar Bagrationi
- Children: 3
- Occupation: Politician; footballer
Association football career
- Height: 1.80 m (5 ft 11 in)
- Position: Forward
Youth career
- 1989–1991: Dinamo Tbilisi
Senior career*
Years	Team	Apps	(Gls)
1988–1995	Dinamo Tbilisi	132	(80)
1994–1995	→ Alania Vladikavkaz (loan)	24	(12)
1996–1999	Manchester City	28	(3)
1997–1999	→ Grasshoppers (loan)	59	(20)
1999–2002	Zürich	81	(28)
2002–2003	Luzern	25	(5)
2003–2004	Sion	10	(6)
2004–2005	Aarau	16	(8)
2004	→ Alania Vladikavkaz (loan)	7	(0)
2005–2006	Basel	14	(4)
Total		396	(166)
International career
1991–2002	Georgia	46	(9)
- * Club domestic league appearances and goals

Mikheil Kavelashvili (Georgian: მიხეილ ყაველაშვილი [miχeil qʼaveɫaʃʷili]; born 22 July 1971) is a Georgian politician and former professional footballer who was sworn in as the sixth president of Georgia on 29 December 2024. His election, the first to be conducted through an electoral college following constitutional changes in 2017, is being disputed by the Georgian opposition, as well as by significant parts of the Western community. He was the sole candidate for presidency for the first time in Georgia's history because of the opposition's boycott.

As a football player, he was a striker who played in the English Premier League for Manchester City and in the Swiss Super League for a range of clubs. He also played for Dinamo Tbilisi and Spartak Vladikavkaz. He was capped 46 times by the Georgian national football team.

== Football career ==
As with many leading Georgian players, Kavelashvili began his career with Dinamo Tbilisi, emerging from their youth system in 1989. A striker, he soon established himself in the Dinamo side before earning a move to Russian club Spartak Vladikavkaz in 1995. He won the Russian Premier League during his year at the club from North Ossetia–Alania.

Kavelashvili began training with Manchester City on 1 March 1996, before finally joining the club on 28 March, which was transfer deadline day. He was recommended to manager Alan Ball by compatriot Georgi Kinkladze, who had joined for £2 million in the summer. The Kavelashvili deal, which was worth £1.4 million, took several weeks due to the player requiring a work permit. He made his City debut on 6 April by scoring in the Manchester derby game against Manchester United, and totalled 4 games and 1 goal in the Premier League as City were relegated.

Following City's relegation, Kavelashvili played 24 games (two goals) in the Football League First Division. The number was not enough to secure a renewal of his work permit, and he was sent out on loan to Grasshoppers, winning a Swiss Super League in 1998. He then played the majority of his football in Switzerland, featuring for Zürich, Luzern, Sion and Aarau. Aarau loaned him out to Vladikavkaz in autumn 2004, but he returned to Switzerland after playing just seven games.

Kavelashvili joined Basel's first team during their 2005–06 season under head coach Christian Gross, who was behind Grasshoppers' league win in 1998. Kavelashvili played his domestic league debut for the club in the home game in the St. Jakob-Park on 12 March 2006 as he was substituted in the 66th minute; he scored the only goal of the win over Grasshoppers. Basel had started the season well and were joint leaders of the championship with Zürich right until the last day of the league campaign, when they lost the title on goal difference.

Kavelashvili had ten appearances for FCB in his first season and in each he had been used as a substitute. In his second season, he made seven appearances, again each as substitute, but the club released him before the winter break, and he retired from his active football career. During his period with the club, he played a total of 17 games (three in the UEFA Cup) and scored 4 goals.

With the Georgia national team, he won the 1998 Malta International Football Tournament.

In 2015, he planned to run for president of the Georgian Football Federation, but due to a lack of higher education, he was unable to participate in the election.

== Political career ==
In 2016, Kavelashvili was elected as a member of Parliament of Georgia for the Georgian Dream party. He was re-elected in 2020. He left Georgian Dream in 2022 and co-founded the People's Power party, a satellite of Georgian Dream designed to propagate anti-Western narratives without incriminating the ruling party.

Kavelashvili laid the foundations of the Global War Party conspiracy spread by Georgian Dream leaders since 2022, by insinuating US ambassador Kelly Degnan tried to blackmail Bidzina Ivanishvili into the war in Ukraine. He has since made unsubstantiated accusations that the political opposition in Georgia are being controlled by US congressmen with "an insatiable desire to destroy our country" and that they were plotting "a direct violent revolution and the Ukrainisation of Georgia".

Being described as right-wing populist and ultranationalist, Kavelashvili also accused the West of wanting "as many people as possible (to be) neutral and tolerant towards LGBTQ ideology", which he called "an act against humanity".

== President of Georgia (2024–present) ==
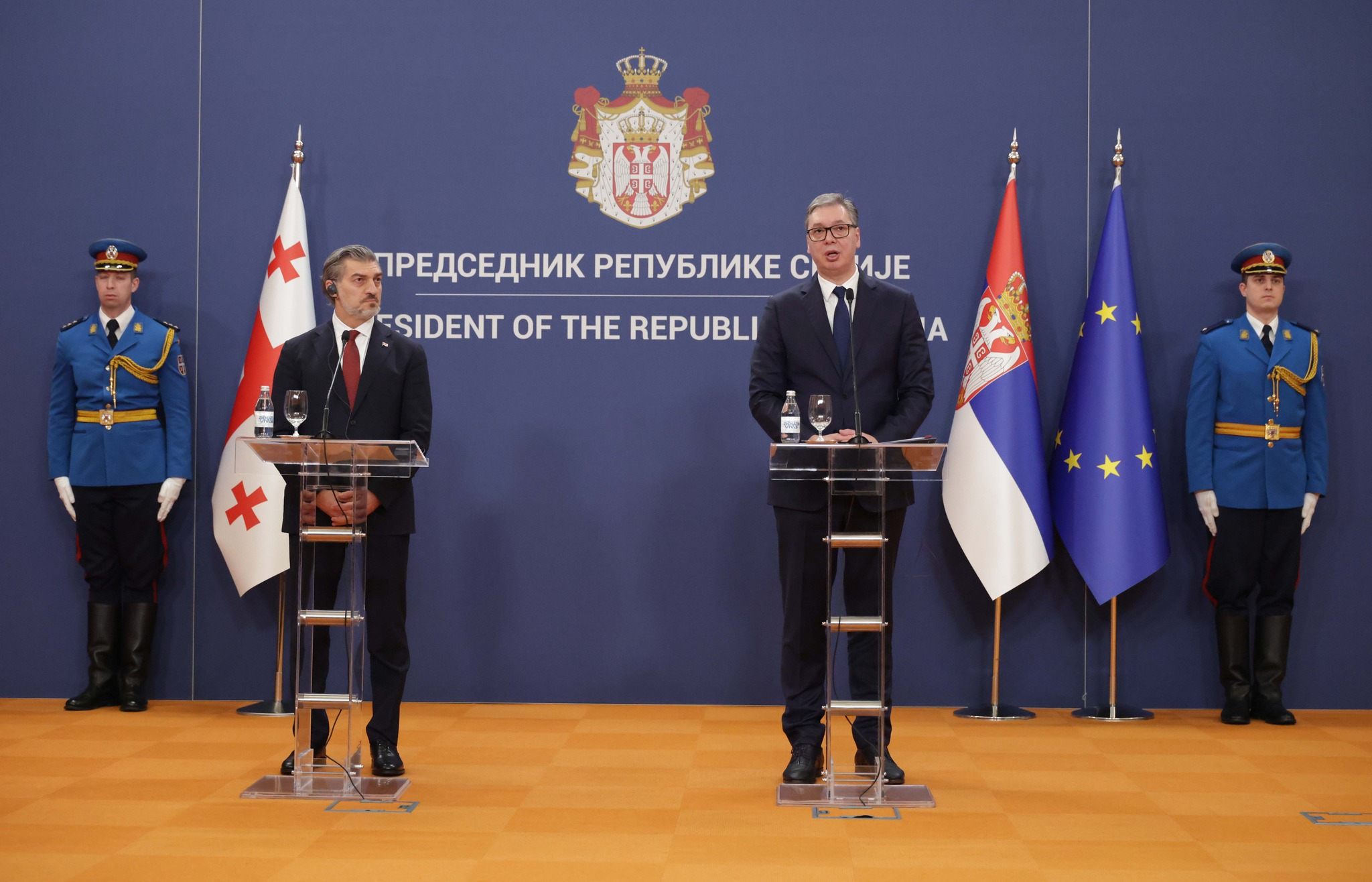
Kavelashvili holding a press conference with President Aleksandar Vučić of Serbia in Belgrade, December 2025. Serbia and Georgia, both EU candidates, are regarded by the EU as poor performers due to democratic backsliding and issues with the rule of law.

People's Power joined the party list of Georgian Dream for the 2024 parliamentary election, with Kavelashvili being elected for the third time. A month after the disputed elections, he was nominated as Georgian Dream's candidate for the presidency of Georgia. He remained the sole candidate, a first in Georgia's presidential elections, due to a boycott by the opposition. Due to constitutional changes in 2017 affecting the electoral system, the election took place for the first time through an electoral college, rather than a direct popular vote by the Georgian citizens.

In his nomination speech, Kavelashvili accused outgoing president Salome Zourabichvili of violating the constitution. As sole candidate in the election on 14 December 2024, Kavelashvili received 224 out of 225 votes in the 300-member electoral college and was proclaimed the next president. The opposition boycotted their participation in the electoral college. Kavelashvili was sworn in on 29 December 2024. He is the third former professional football player to become a country's president, following in the footsteps of Algeria's first president Ahmed Ben Bella between 1963 and 1965 and the election of George Weah as President of Liberia between 2018 and 2024.

=== Disputed election ===
The election of Kavelashvili as president was disputed and regarded as illegitimate by the opposition, outgoing president Salome Zourabichvili, watchdog organizations and Georgian constitutional experts, as well as by significant parts of the Western community. This was largely based on allegations of electoral fraud associated with the parliamentary election seven weeks prior, which undermined the legitimacy of parliament and therefore the electoral college, which included all 150 members of parliament. Zourabichvili, along with opposition parties, civil society, and foreign actors, continued to assert her recognition as the legitimate President of Georgia. On 13 February 2025, the European Parliament passed a resolution stating that the European Union does not recognize Kavelashvili as the legitimate president of Georgia.

=== Presidency ===
On 20 March 2025, Kavelashvili appointed political scientist, blogger, and TikTok creator Luka Ekhvaia as his advisor on foreign relations, who has been described as far-left, anti-Western, and pro-China.

== Football career statistics ==
=== International ===
Appearances and goals by national team and year
National team	Year	Apps	Goals
Georgia	1991	1	1
Georgia	1992	1	0
Georgia	1993	–	
Georgia	1994	7	1
Georgia	1995	4	0
Georgia	1996	2	0
Georgia	1997	5	1
Georgia	1998	5	3
Georgia	1999	4	1
Georgia	2000	8	2
Georgia	2001	7	0
Georgia	2002	2	0
Total		46	9

Scores and results list Georgia's goal tally first, score column indicates score after each Kavelashvili goal.

List of international goals scored by Mikhail Kavelashvili
No.	Date	Venue	Opponent	Score	Result	Competition
1	2 July 1991	Republican Stadium, Chișinău, Moldova	Moldova	4–2	4–2	Friendly
2	12 February 1994	National Stadium, Ta' Qali, Malta	Tunisia	1–0	2–0	1994 Malta International Football Tournament
3	30 March 1997	Boris Paichadze National Stadium, Tbilisi, Georgia	Armenia	7–0	7–0	Friendly
4	8 February 1998	National Stadium, Ta' Qali, Malta	Albania	2–0	3–0	1998 Malta International Football Tournament
5	10 February 1998	National Stadium, Ta' Qali, Malta	Malta	1–0	3–1	1998 Malta International Tournament
6	10 February 1998	National Stadium, Ta' Qali, Malta	Malta	3–1	3–1	1998 Malta International Tournament
7	8 September 1999	Boris Paichadze National Stadium, Tbilisi, Georgia	Latvia	2–0	2–2	UEFA Euro 2000 qualification
8	2 February 2000	Antonis Papadopoulos Stadium, Larnaca, Cyprus	Slovakia	2–0	2–0	2000 Cyprus International Tournament
9	16 August 2000	Azadi Stadium, Tehran, Iran	Iran	1–2	1–2	Friendly

== Sports honours ==
Dinamo Tbilisi

- Umaglesi Liga: 1990, 1994, 1995

Vladikavkaz

- Russian Premier League: 1995

Grasshoppers

- Swiss Super League: 1998

== See also ==
- Kakha Kaladze
- Levan Kobiashvili
- Georgi Nemsadze
