= Presidential Palace, Tbilisi =

Presidential Palace
- საქართველოს პრეზიდენტის სასახლე
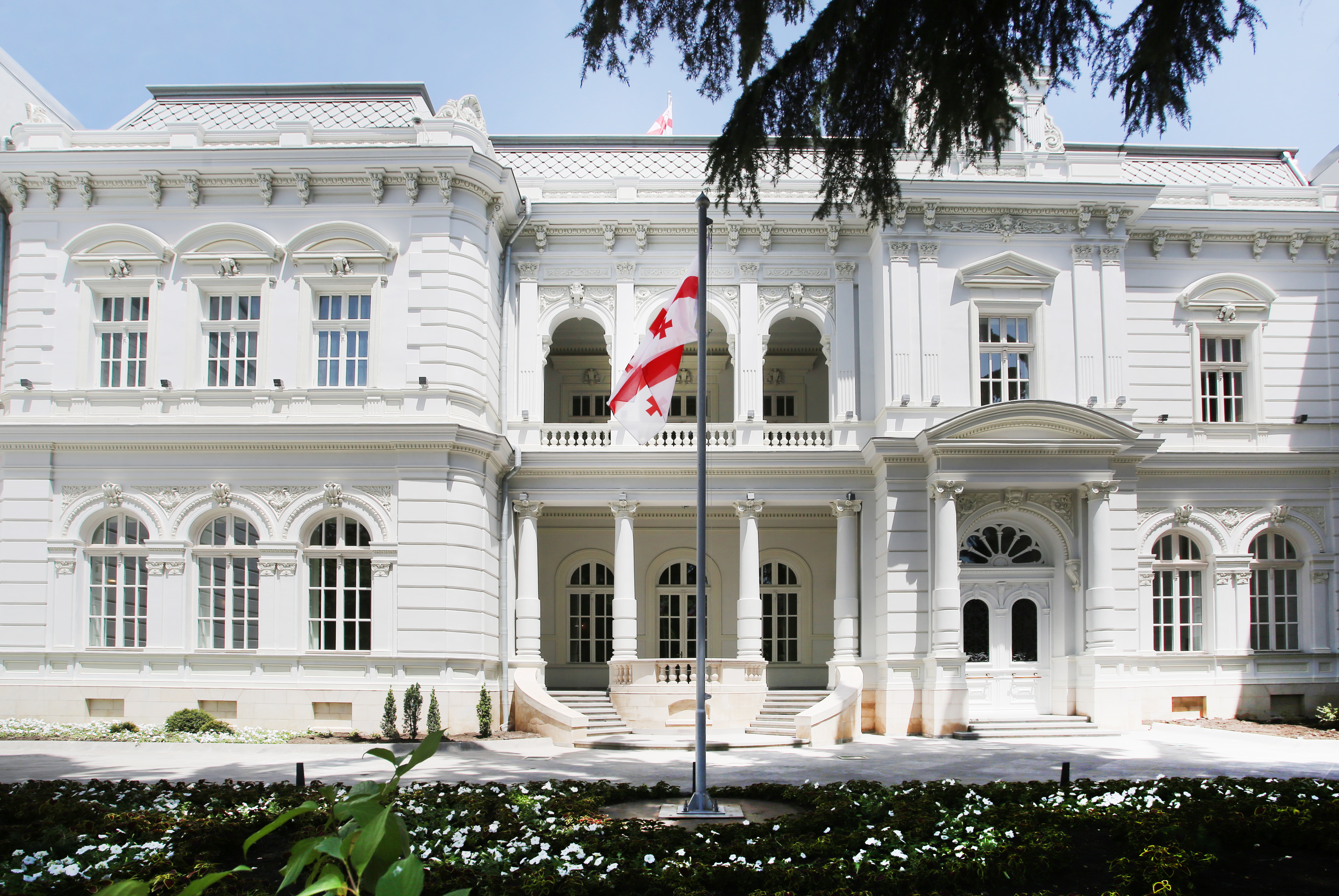
- Presidential Palace in 2019

- Location within Tbilisi Presidential Palace, Tbilisi (Georgia)

General information
- Status: Active
- Location: 25 Atoneli Street, Tbilisi, Georgia
- Coordinates: 41°41′58″N 44°48′09″E
- Current tenants: Mikheil Kavelashvili, President of Georgia

Website
- president.ge

Cultural Heritage Monument of Georgia
- Official name: Government Residence /Residential house
- Designated: October 1, 2007; 18 years ago
- Reference no.: 3730
- Item Number in Cultural Heritage Portal: 3555
- Date of entry in the registry: October 11, 2007; 18 years ago
- Accounting Card / Passport #: 010306215

The Presidential Palace (Georgian: საქართველოს პრეზიდენტის სასახლე, romanized: sakartvelos p'rezident'is sasakhle), the Orbeliani Palace (Georgian: ორბელიანის სასახლე, romanized: orbelianis sasakhle) or the Atoneli Residence (Georgian: ათონელის რეზიდენცია, romanized: atonelis rezidentsia) is the official residence of the president of Georgia since November 2018. It is located on Atoneli Street in Central Tbilisi. It was once home to Elizabeth Orbeliani, a Georgian poet and the country's first female academic.

== History ==
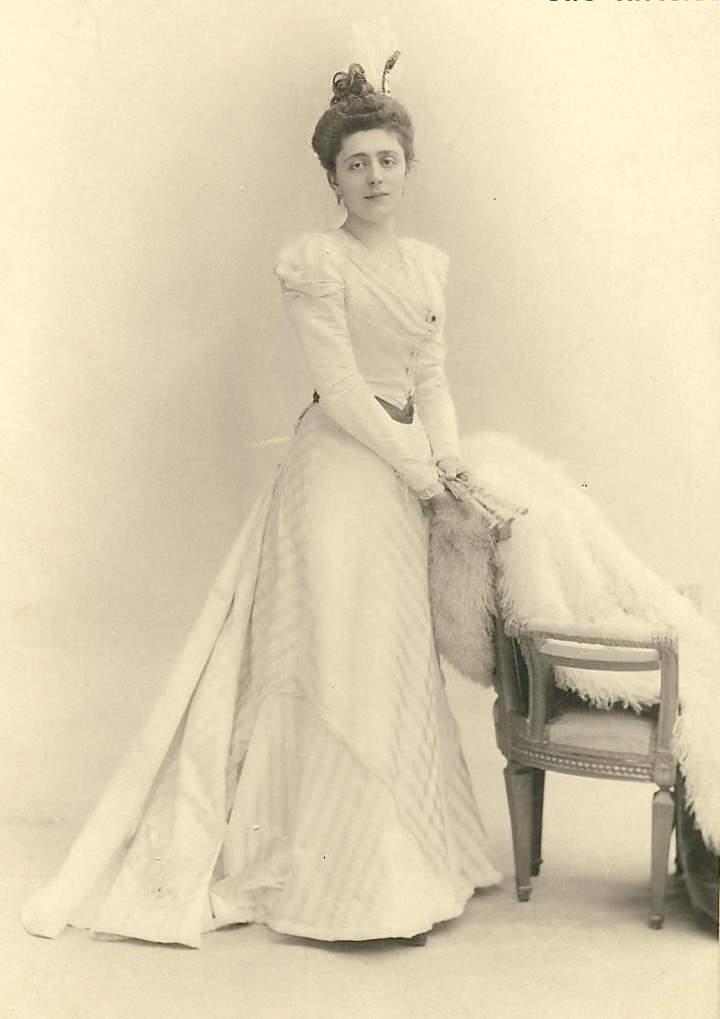
Elizabeth Orbeliani

The Orbeliani Palace dates back to the end of the 19th century. Its residents included Grigol Orbeliani, a Georgian Romanticist poet, and Elizabeth Orbeliani, a poet and Georgia's first woman professor. To this day, a room in the palace dedicated to Elizabeth Orbeliani is used to receive foreign dignitaries.

The building also served as the U.S. Embassy in Georgia in the 1990s and early 2000s. In 2013, about 25 million Georgian lari was spent renovating the palace.

The palace is sometimes called the "Atoneli Residence" because it is located on Atoneli Street, named after the medieval Georgian monk George of Athos.

=== Presidential residence ===
Georgian politician and former French diplomat Salome Zourabichvili announced during her 2018 presidential campaign that she would not work from the Avlabari Presidential Palace if elected. That palace, which opened in July 2009, was built during the presidency of Mikheil Saakashvili, with whom Zourabichvili had a fallout. Zourabichvili stated that she preferred Orbeliani Palace because it was more understated and that members of the House of Orbeliani and Baratashvili, who once resided there, were her ancestors.

After her election, she met with the outgoing President, Giorgi Margvelashvili, in the Avlabari Palace before moving into the Orbeliani Palace on 18 December 2018.

== Names of reception rooms ==
- Amra Hall
- Galaktion Hall
- Golden Fleece Hall
- Prometheus Hall
- Rustaveli Hall
- Sulkhan-Saba Orbeliani Presidential Cabinet

== Gallery ==
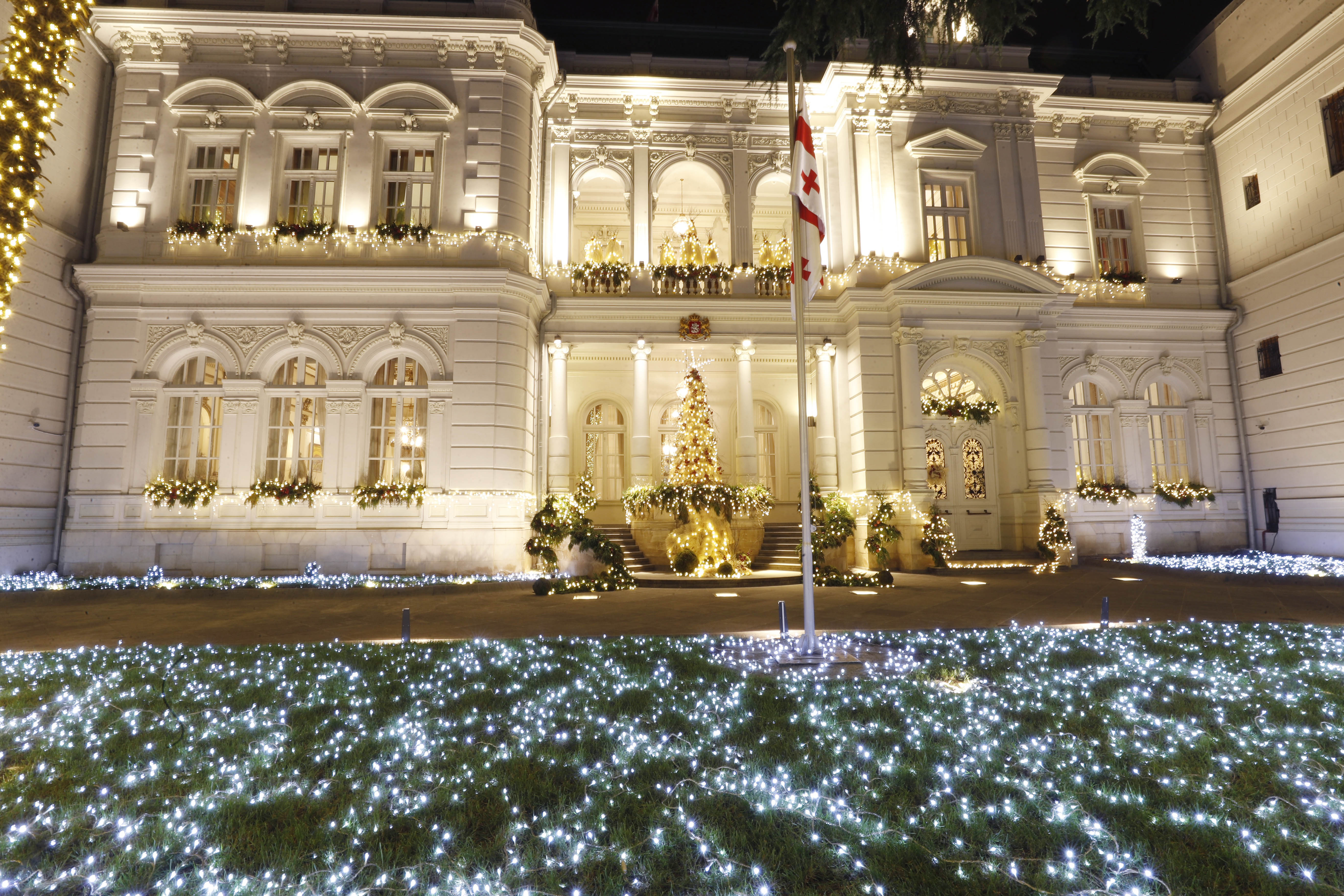
Orbeliani Palace decorated for Christmas

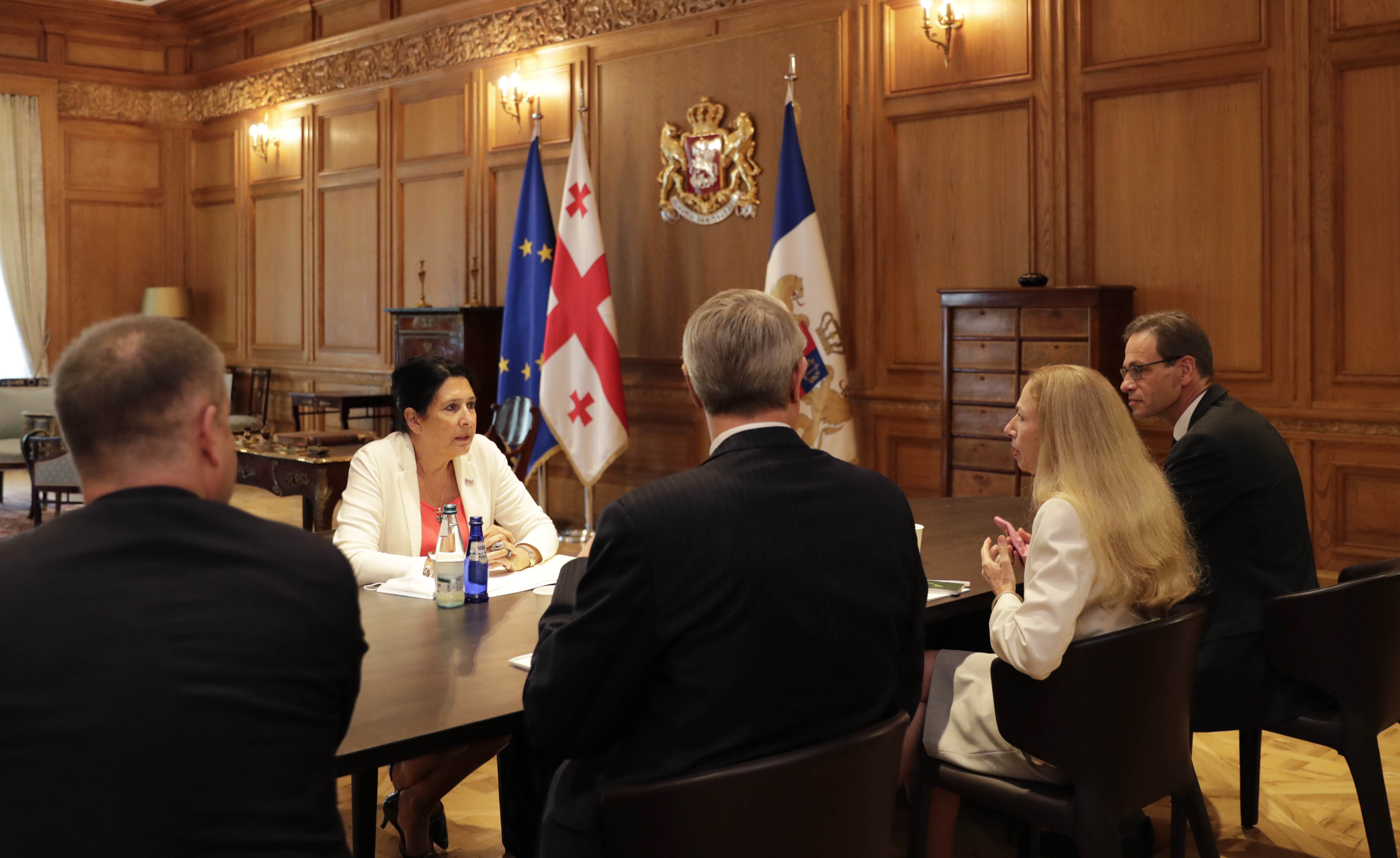
President Salome Zourabichvili meeting with foreign ambassadors inside Orbeliani Palace

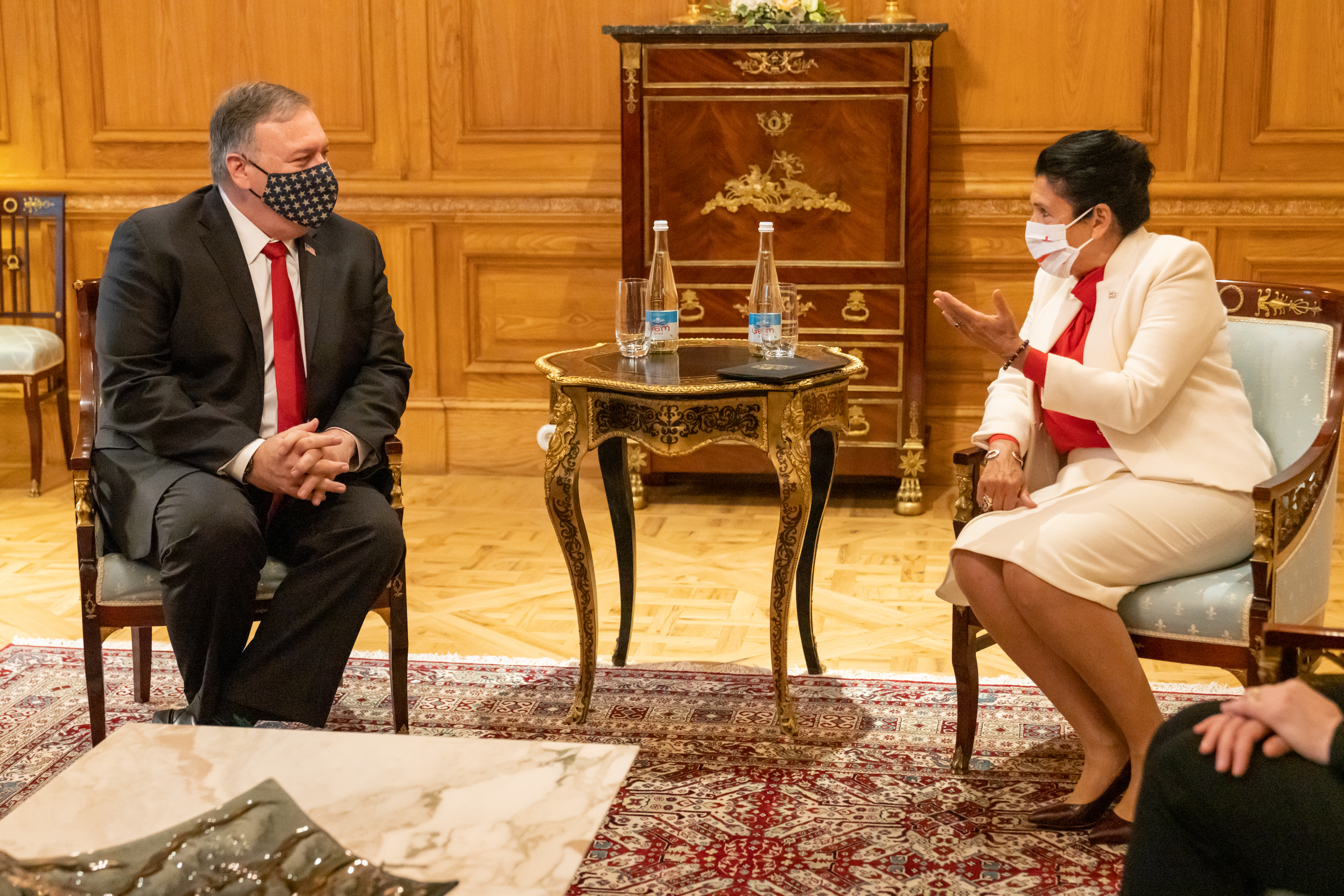
President Salome Zourabichvili meeting with U.S. Secretary of State Mike Pompeo

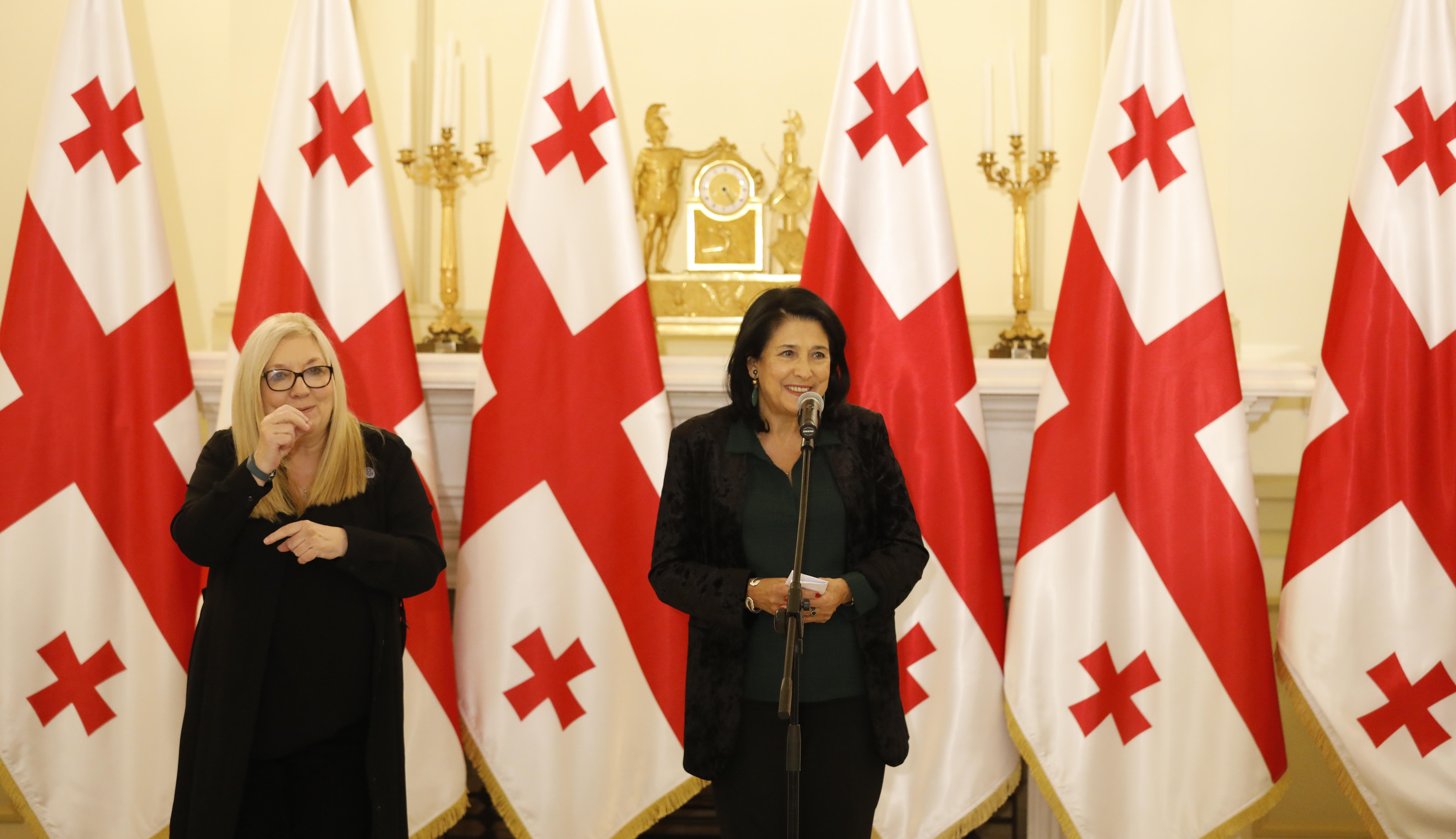
President Salome Zourabichvili addressing the Deaf Association
