= People's Power (Georgia) =

National conservative political party in Georgia (country)

People's Power ხალხის ძალა
- Chairman: Sozar Subari
- Founders: Sozar Subari; Mikheil Kavelashvili; Dimitri Khundadze
- Founded: 2 August 2022
- Split from: Georgian Dream
- Ideology: National conservatism; Right-wing populism; Sovereigntism; Euroscepticism
- Political position: Right-wing to far-right
- National affiliation: Georgian Dream (2024)
- Colors: Blue; Maroon
- Parliament of Georgia: 8 / 150
- Municipal Councilors: 0 / 2,058

Website
- Facebook page

People's Power (Georgian: ხალხის ძალა, romanized: khalkhis dzala) is a political party in Georgia. It was founded by MPs Sozar Subari, Mikheil Kavelashvili and Dimitri Khundadze, after they nominally separated from the ruling Georgian Dream.

People's Power is thought to be controlled by the ruling Georgian Dream party, created with the purpose of attracting socially conservative, anti-liberal anti-Western voters while still maintaining some pro-Western ones under its own banner. By 2024, Georgian Dream could still rely on People's Power for anti-Western narratives, but its own transformation into a dominant right-wing populist force with similar narratives was by then complete.

For the 2024 Georgian parliamentary election, People's Power was absorbed back into Georgian Dream and ran as part of the Georgian Dream party list; all nine incumbent MPs of People's Power were re-elected through GD's party list. During the 2024 presidential election, Georgian Dream nominated and supported People's Power member Mikheil Kavelashvili as a candidate for the presidency. Kavelashvili was subsequently elected as the President of Georgia by the Georgian Electoral Assembly.

== History ==
Party logo until 18 March 2024

The People's Power movement was founded on 2 August 2022 by the Georgian MPs Sozar Subari, Mikheil Kavelashvili and Dimitri Khundadze, who had left the ruling Georgian Dream party on 28 June. They said that the reason for their departure was the disagreement with the Georgian Dream on the tactical issues, but they remained in agreement on core values and that the movement would remain aligned with the Georgian Dream party in the Parliament. The leaders of the movement said that they wanted to speak more directly about "truth that is hidden behind the scenes of Georgian politics", such as the Western involvement in it.

As of October 2022, nine deputies had already joined the movement, depriving the Georgian Dream of its parliamentary majority. The deputies in People's Power decided to still support the Georgian Dream-led government.

On 29 December 2022, People's Power announced that it would introduce a foreign agent law to the Parliament of Georgia. The bill proposed that all non-governmental organizations and media outlets should disclose sources of their funding and register themselves as "agents of foreign influence" if they receive more than 20% of their funding from abroad. This led to the 2023 Georgian protests. The president of Georgia, Salome Zurabishvili, supported the protesters and said she would veto the bill. The parliament withdrew the bill after protests.

On 18 March 2024, a party congress was convened, which reorganised the movement into a political party and elected MP Sozar Subari as its chairman.

For the 2024 Georgian parliamentary election the party joined the Georgian Dream party list and all nine incumbent MPs of the party were re-elected. On 27 November 2024, Georgian Dream honorary chair Bidzina Ivanishvili presented People's Power MP Mikheil Kavelashvili as nominee for the 2024 presidential election, scheduled on 14 December 2024. As result, his parliamentary mandate was terminated ahead of this election, leaving People's Power with eight MPs.

On 13 December 2024, People's Power MP Guram Macharashvili announced the party would leave the parliamentary majority to go into opposition and "thus lay the foundation for the existence of a healthy opposition in Georgia". In its election campaign, ruling Georgian Dream promised to cleanse the opposition by banning the "UNM and its satellites" in order to foster "healthy opposition".

== Political positions ==
=== Foreign policy ===
The movement has notably criticized the United States foreign policy in Georgia. In a number of public letters, its members have questioned US funding for Georgia, saying that it only served to strengthen American interests in Georgia at the expense of Georgia's state institutions and sovereignty.

It has accused the United States Embassy of interfering in the country's internal affairs and undermining the Georgian judiciary.

The movement has accused a number of Georgian political parties (including the largest opposition party, United National Movement) and NGOs of being American agents. The movement has accused the USAID of "attacking Georgia's sovereignty" and "trying to subjugate the Georgian judiciary to foreign control".

The movement has criticized democracy promotion by the United States, saying that this only serves as a cover to promote American interests. According to People's Power, this is accomplished through non-governmental organizations, which are funded by the United States in other countries to "strengthen democracy", but in reality serve to promote American agenda. Therefore, People's Power claims that the democracy promotion by the United States "is not aimed at strengthening the democratic system, but at undermining it", because such foreign involvement contradicts the principles of democracy such as popular sovereignty and separation of powers. According to People's Power, this process is aimed at substituting the actual democracy with "agentocracy", in which "government coalitions are formed in which the majority of parties represent agencies of foreign influence", while the countries which reject agentocracy are being accused of "democratic setback".

People's Power has criticized the American efforts to export their "model of democracy" to other countries, which in Georgia has manifested itself in the "Saakashvili regime" and its widespread use of "torture and rape" against people.

Citing Indian prime minister Jawaharlal Nehru, People's Power has noted that "there is no bigger enemy to the country than the elite raised by the colonizer".

The movement supports limiting foreign funding of the NGOs to curb foreign influence. It claims to defend Georgia's sovereignty from external influences and has been described as sovereigntist.

=== LGBT ===
The members of the party have condemned "LGBT propaganda" in Georgia, which its members think erases Georgian identity, conscience, faith and traditions.

According to People's Power, the issue is not the existence of the LGBT people, but the "aggressive propaganda" and promotion of such lifestyle through media industry, art, pride parades, social media and other means.

The member of the movement Zurab Kadagidze stated that the exposure of the young children in schools to the "LGBT theories", such as "sexual self-exploration through artificial, manipulative means" encouraged by LGBT propagandists, negatively affects their consciousness and development.

Khundadze stated that LGBT propaganda was a tool to deconstruct the institution of family and turn people into a "stateless biological mass". The negative consequences of such "propaganda" include the demotion of national and Christian values and the massive upsurge of people who identify as the LGBT, with People's Power citing France, the United States, Spain and the Great Britain as few examples of such trends.

Khundadze has called out the United States as the promoter of LGBT propaganda in Georgia. According to the movement, the European integration would only be acceptable if Georgia would preserve its national and Christian values, join Europe without being asked to renounce its "traditions and dignity". The movement sympathizes with Donald Trump, Viktor Orbán, Recep Tayyip Erdoğan and the Chamber of Deputies of the Czech Republic in their efforts to curb "LGBT propaganda".

== Leadership ==
The party is led by the Chair, who is the leader of the party's political council. The current chairman is Sozar Subari.

- Sozar Subari (2024–)

== Seats in Municipal assemblies from 2022 to 2025 ==
Municipal Council	Seats	Status
Lagodekhi	1 / 30	Government
Telavi	1 / 39	Government
Gori	2 / 36	Government
Borjomi	2 / 33	Government
Akhaltsikhe	3 / 39	Government
Adigeni	3 / 33	Government
Aspindza	3 / 30	Government
Akhalkalaki	2 / 42	Government
Ninotsminda	2 / 30	Government
Terjola	1 / 30	Government
Chiatura	1 / 36	Government
Khobi	1 / 36	Government
Zugdidi	2 / 45	Opposition
Batumi	1 / 35	Government
Shuakhevi	2 / 21	Government

== Electoral performance ==
=== Parliamentary election ===
Election	Leader	Votes	%	Seats	+/–	Position	Status	Coalition
2024	Sozar Subari	1,120,053	53.93	9 / 150	New	1st	Government (GD–PP) (2024)	Georgian Dream
2024	Sozar Subari	1,120,053	53.93	9 / 150	New	1st	Opposition (2024–)	Georgian Dream
