= Ada Marshania =

Georgian politician

Ada Marshania (Georgian: ადა მარშანია; born 1 July 1961 in Sukhumi) is an ethnic Abkhaz and became the Deputy of the Supreme Council of the de jure Government of Abkhazia in exile in Georgia upon the resignation of Temur Mzhavia, the former holder of that title, in July 2006. She was a member of the Parliament of Georgia. She represented the Alliance of Patriots of Georgia until 2021.

== Political career ==
In December 2024, as a member of a 300 person electoral college determining the Georgian presidency, Marshania refused to support Georgian presidential candidate Mikheil Kavelashvili, instead casting an empty ballot, and criticised the Georgian Dream party for having nominated him.

== See also ==
- 2006 Kodori crisis
