= President of Georgia =

Head of state

President of Georgia საქართველოს პრეზიდენტი
- Presidential standard

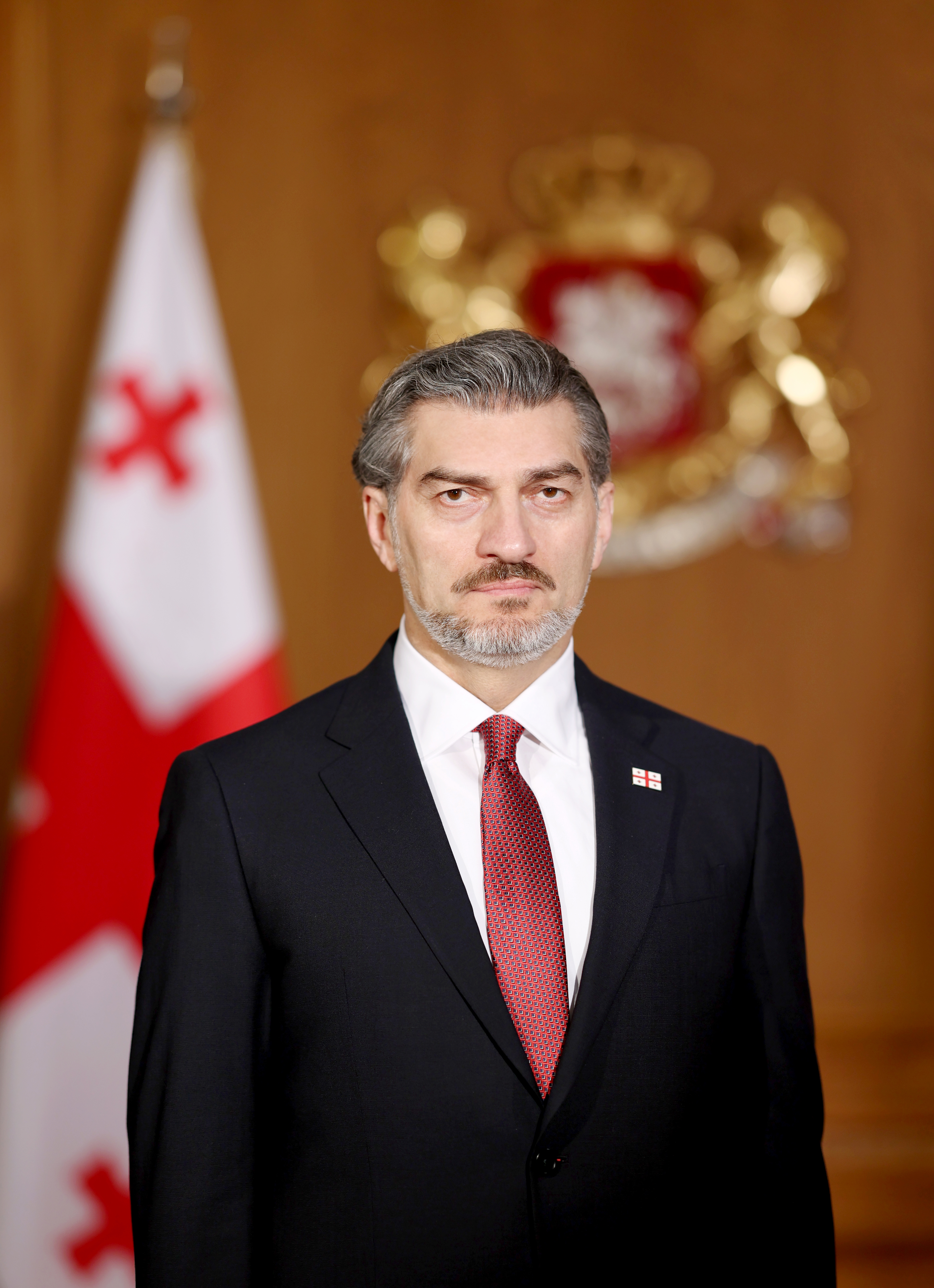
- Incumbent; Mikheil Kavelashvili; Disputed (Note: Kavelashvili's election as President is contested by outgoing President Salome Zourabichvili, all large opposition parties, as well as numerous watchdogs and constitutional experts, who question the legitimacy of the 2024 Georgian parliamentary election that determined the composition of the electoral college for the presidential election. Internationally, the European Parliament has expressed it continues to recognise Salome Zourabichvili as the legitimate president.) since 29 December 2024
- Office of the President of Georgia
- Type: Head of state Commander-in-chief
- Residence: Orbeliani Palace (since November 2018)
- Appointer: Georgian Electoral Assembly
- Term length: Five years, renewable once
- Constituting instrument: Constitution of Georgia (1995)
- Inaugural holder: Zviad Gamsakhurdia
- Formation: 14 April 1991 (35 years ago)
- Deputy: Chairperson of the Parliament
- Salary: ₾13,000 / €4,500 per month
- Website: Official website

The president of Georgia (Georgian: საქართველოს პრეზიდენტი, romanized: sakartvelos p'rezident'i) is the ceremonial head of state of Georgia as well as the commander-in-chief of the Defence Forces. The constitution defines the presidential office as "the guarantor of the country's unity and national independence."

The president is largely a figurehead, as in many parliamentary democracies, but retains some significant authorities, such as the right to issue pardons. Executive power is vested in the Government and the prime minister. The office was first introduced by the Supreme Council of the Republic of Georgia on 14 April 1991, five days after Georgia's declaration of independence from the Soviet Union. Currently, the presidential term is five years.

On 14 December 2024, the Georgian Electoral Assembly elected Mikheil Kavelashvili as the new president and he was inaugurated on 29 December 2024. It was the first indirect presidential election in Georgia's history after the constitutional amendments changed the electoral system in 2017. Opposition parties, Georgian constitutional experts, as well as parts of the international community consider Kavelashvili's presidency illegitimate and maintain that Salome Zourabichvili continues to be the president.

== Qualifications ==
Any citizen of Georgia having the electoral right, who has attained the age of 35 and who has lived in Georgia for at least 15 years, may be elected President of Georgia. The office cannot be held by a citizen of Georgia who is simultaneously the citizen of a foreign country. nor a member of a political party.

== Election ==
According to the 2018 version of Georgia's constitution, starting in 2024, the president is elected for a five-year term by the 300-member Electoral College, consisting of all members of the Parliament of Georgia and of the supreme representative bodies of the autonomous republics of Abkhazia and Adjara, also members from the representative bodies of local self-governments (municipalities). The same person may be elected President of Georgia only twice. No less than 30 members of the Electoral College shall have the right to nominate a candidate for the president of Georgia. The election of the president of Georgia is appointed by the Parliament for October.

== Impeachment ==
One third of the total number of the members of Parliament has the right to raise the question of impeachment of the president of Georgia. They can be considered impeached if the decision is supported by at least two thirds of the members of Parliament. The procedure of the impeachment of the president is constitutionally banned during a state of emergency or martial law.

== Constitutional powers and duties ==
1. The President of Georgia shall:

a) with the consent of the Government, exercise representative powers in foreign relations, negotiate with other states and international organisations, conclude international treaties, and accept the accreditation of ambassadors and other diplomatic representatives of other states and international organisations; upon nomination by the Government, appoint and dismiss ambassadors and other heads of diplomatic missions of Georgia;

b) conclude a constitutional agreement with the Apostolic Autocephalous Orthodox Church of Georgia on behalf of the state of Georgia;

c) call the elections of Parliament and local self-government bodies in accordance with the Constitution and the procedures established by the organic law;

d) upon nomination by the Government, appoint and dismiss the Commander of the Defence Forces of Georgia; appoint one member of the High Council of Justice; participate in the appointment of the chairperson and members of the Central Election Commission of Georgia in cases defined by the organic law and in accordance with the established procedure; upon nomination by the Government, submit to Parliament candidates for the membership of the national regulatory bodies;

e) decide on citizenship issues in accordance with the procedures established by the organic law;

f) pardon convicts;

g) in accordance with the procedures established by law, grant state awards and rewards; highest military ranks, special ranks and honorary titles; and highest diplomatic ranks;

h) be entitled, upon recommendation by the Government and with the consent of Parliament, to suspend the activity of a representative body of a territorial unit, or to dissolve such a body, if its activities threaten the sovereignty or territorial integrity of the country, or the exercise of constitutional powers by state bodies;

i) exercise other powers determined by the Constitution.

2. The President of Georgia shall have the right to call a referendum on issues defined in the Constitution and law, at the request of the Parliament of Georgia, the Government of Georgia or no less than 200 000 voters, within 30 days after such a request is received. A referendum shall not be held in order to adopt or repeal a law, to grant amnesty or pardon, to ratify or denounce international treaties, or to decide issues that envisage the restriction of fundamental constitutional human rights. Issues related to calling and holding referendums shall be defined by the organic law.

3. The President of Georgia shall have the right to address the people. The President shall annually submit a report on crucial state-related issues to Parliament.

== Oath ==
Prior to assuming office, on the third Sunday after the election day, the newly elected president of Georgia addresses the people and is required to take the following oath of office:

მე, საქართველოს პრეზიდენტი, ღვთისა და ერის წინაშე ვფიცავ, რომ დავიცავ საქართველოს კონსტიტუციას, ქვეყნის დამოუკიდებლობას, ერთიანობასა და განუყოფლობას, კეთილსინდისიერად აღვასრულებ პრეზიდენტის მოვალეობას, ვიზრუნებ ჩემი ქვეყნის მოქალაქეთა უსაფრთხოებისა და კეთილდღეობისათვის, ჩემი ხალხისა და მამულის აღორძინებისა და ძლევამოსილებისათვის.
I, the President of Georgia, do solemnly affirm before God and the nation that I will support and defend the Constitution of Georgia, the independence, unity and indivisibility of the country; that I will faithfully perform the duties of the President, will care for the security and welfare of the citizens of my country and for the revival and might of my nation and homeland.

== Immunity ==
The president of Georgia enjoys immunity. No one shall have the right to detain or bring criminal proceedings against the president of Georgia while in office. Security of the president of Georgia is provided by the Special State Protection Service.

== Standard ==
The standard is adapted from the national flag of Georgia, charged in the center with the Georgian coat of arms. Copies of the standard are used inside the president's office, at the Chancellery Building, other state agencies, and as a car flag on vehicles bearing the president within Georgian territory.

== History of office ==
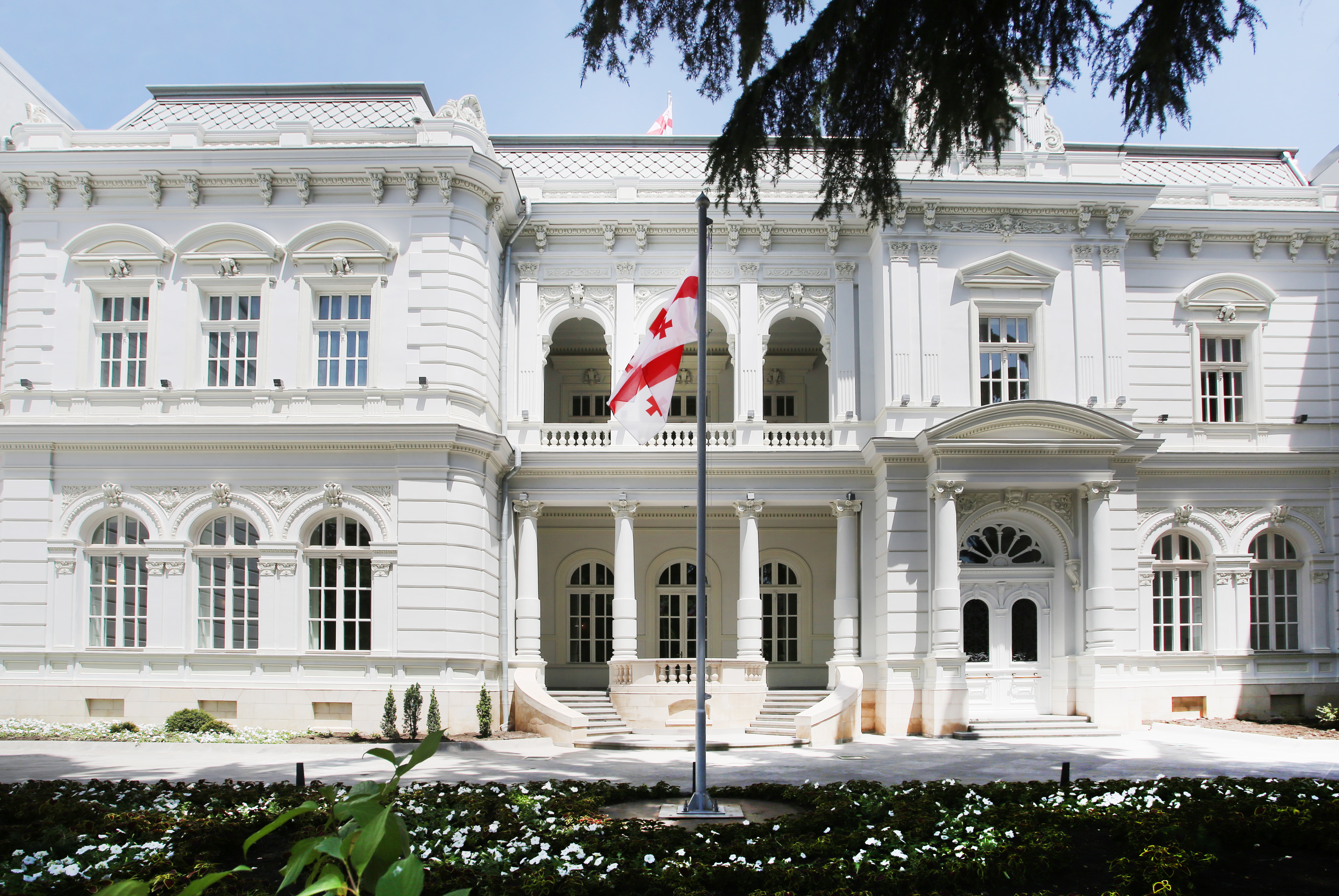
Orbeliani Palace is the official seat of the Georgian President.

After Georgia formally seceded from the Soviet Union on 9 April 1991, the Supreme Council voted, on 14 April, to create the post of executive president, and appointed Zviad Gamsakhurdia to the office pending the holding of direct elections. In the nationwide elections to this post, on 26 May 1991, Gamsakhurdia won a landslide victory, becoming the first president of the Republic of Georgia. Gamsakhurdia was ousted in a military coup d'état on 6 January 1992. He continued to function as a president-in-exile until his death in a failed attempt to regain power on 31 December 1993.

In the post-coup absence of legitimate power, a position of the head of state was introduced for Georgia's new leader Eduard Shevardnadze on 10 March 1992. After the adoption of a new Constitution on 24 August 1995, the post of president was restored. Shevardnadze was elected to presidency on 5 November 1995, and reelected on 9 April 2000. He resigned under pressure of mass demonstrations known as Rose Revolution on 23 November 2003. After Nino Burjanadze's brief tenure as an acting president, Mikheil Saakashvili was elected on 4 January 2004. He did not serve his full first term, but voluntarily resigned to defuse tensions in the aftermath of the 2007 Georgian demonstrations and brought the presidential elections forward from the original date in autumn 2008. He was reelected on 5 January 2008. The president's executive powers were significantly curtailed in favor of the prime minister and the government in a series of amendments passed between 2013 and 2018. After the election of Giorgi Margvelashvili to presidency in October 2013, Georgia finalized its transition to a parliamentary republic. In November 2018, Salome Zourabichvili, became Georgia's first female president in permanent capacity and, according to the new constitution, the last president to be elected by a direct vote.

=== 2024 succession dispute ===
The 2024–2025 Georgian political crisis was a political crisis in the country of Georgia surrounding the disputed legitimacy of the October 2024 Georgian parliamentary election. According to a number of observers, the election was conducted with significant irregularities and was "fundamentally flawed". The crisis continued with the self-convening of Parliament, described by pro-opposition President Salomé Zourabichvili as unconstitutional, and escalated with the decision of the ruling party to suspend preparations for EU accession negotiations, which was seen as contradicting Article 78 of the Georgian Constitution. The crisis entered another phase with the election of a new president by the Georgian Electoral Assembly and its 29 December 2024 inauguration of Mikheil Kavelashvili. Salome Zourabichvili stated on 29 December and during the following weeks that she remained the president of Georgia.

The crisis followed the 2023–2024 Georgian protests which sharply increased the political polarization within the country between the ruling Georgian Dream party and the major opposition parties. Protests against the ruling party continued after the election, with hundreds of protesters arrested, beaten or tortured by the police and the ruling-party affiliated violent groups, who also attacked journalists.

On 13 February 2025, the European Parliament passed a resolution stating that the European Union does not recognize Mikheil Kavelashvili as the legitimate president of Georgia.

== Succession and acting president ==
In the event of the president's resignation, death or impeachment, the chairperson of Parliament will temporarily serve as president until a new president is elected. There were cases of this in Georgia in 2003 and 2007, in both cases, the president resigned prematurely and was replaced by the chairperson of parliament, before new elections were held. In both cases, the then-chairperson Nino Burjanadze became acting president, so it can be said that she became the first female president of the country. However, the first female president of Georgia who was actually elected in her own right is Salome Zourabichvili.

== Administration ==
Administration of the President of Georgia
- Georgian: საქართველოს პრეზიდენტის ადმინისტრაცია
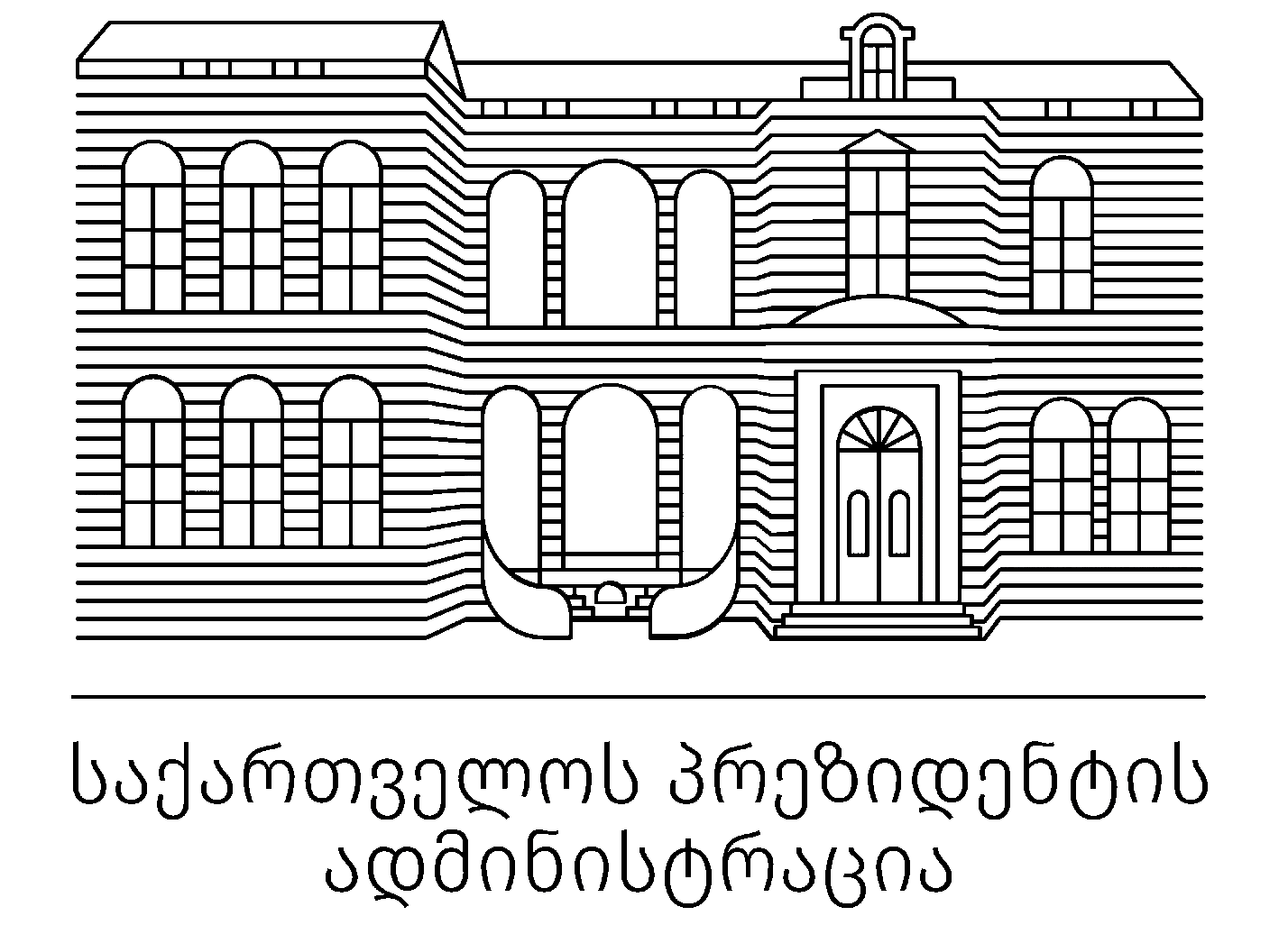
- Logo of the Administration featuring Orbeliani Palace

Agency overview
- Formed: 14 February 2004; 22 years ago
- Headquarters: Orbeliani Palace, Tbilisi
- Agency executive: Vacant, Chief of the Administration
- Website: president.ge

Administration of the President of Georgia (Georgian: საქართველოს პრეზიდენტის ადმინისტრაცია, romanized: sakartvelos p'rezident'is administ'ratsia, sometimes translated as Presidential Administration of Georgia) is the body supporting and organizing the exercise of the powers defined by the Constitution of Georgia and other legislative acts for the President of Georgia. The Administration of the President of Georgia was established on 14 February 2004 by the Decree No.60 of the President of Georgia, Mikheil Saakashvili. In its activities, the administration is guided by the Constitution of Georgia, the legislation of Georgia, the statute and other legal acts of the President of Georgia. The structure and rules of operation of the administration are determined by the President of Georgia.

== List of officeholders ==
=== Presidents ===
No.	Name (Birth–Death)	Portrait	Took office	Left office	Time in office	Party	Election
1	Zviad Gamsakhurdia (1939–1993)		14 April 1991	6 January 1992 (Deposed)	267 days	Round Table—Free Georgia	1991
The office of the president was vacant from 6 January 1992 to 26 November 1995. (Note: On 22 December 1991, parts of the military launched a coup d'état against the government and the president. On 6 January 1992, the government and the President were deposed and a Military Council, led by Tengiz Kitovani and Jaba Ioseliani, took power in Tbilisi. On 10 March 1992, the Military Council handed the power over to Eduard Shevardnadze, who served as acting head of state until 26 November 1995.)
2	Eduard Shevardnadze (1928–2014)		26 November 1995	23 November 2003 (Forced to resign)	7 years, 362 days	Union of Citizens of Georgia	1995 2000
—	Nino Burjanadze (b. 1964); Acting		23 November 2003	25 January 2004	63 days	United National Movement	–
3	Mikheil Saakashvili (b. 1967)		25 January 2004	25 November 2007 (Resigned)	3 years, 304 days	United National Movement	2004
—	Nino Burjanadze (b. 1964); Acting		25 November 2007	20 January 2008	56 days	United National Movement	–
(3)	Mikheil Saakashvili (b. 1967)		20 January 2008	17 November 2013	5 years, 301 days	United National Movement	2008
4	Giorgi Margvelashvili (b. 1969)		17 November 2013	16 December 2018	5 years, 29 days	Georgian Dream	2013
5	Salome Zourabichvili (b. 1952)		16 December 2018	29 December 2024	6 years, 13 days	Independent (Note: Georgian Dream campaigned for and endorsed the candidacy of Zourabichvili in the 2018 presidential election.)	2018
5	Salome Zourabichvili (b. 1952)		16 December 2018	Incumbent (Disputed)	7 years, 340 days (Disputed)	Independent	2018
6	Mikheil Kavelashvili (b. 1971)		29 December 2024	Incumbent (Disputed)	1 year, 327 days (Disputed)	People's Power (Note: Satellite party of Georgian Dream, which nominated the candidacy of Kavelashvili in the 2024 presidential election.)	2024

=== Chairman of the Supreme Council ===
No.	Name (Birth–Death)	Portrait	Took office	Left office	Time in office	Party	Legislature	Election
1	Zviad Gamsakhurdia (1939–1993)		14 November 1990	14 April 1991	151 days	Round Table—Free Georgia	Supreme Council	1990

=== Interim heads of state (1992–1995) ===
No.	Name (Birth–Death)	Portrait	Took office	Left office	Time in office	Party	Title
—	Jaba Ioseliani (1926–2003)		6 January 1992	10 March 1992	64 days	Mkhedrioni	Co-chairmen of the Military Council
—	Tengiz Kitovani (1938–2023)		6 January 1992	10 March 1992	64 days	National Guard	Co-chairmen of the Military Council
—	Eduard Shevardnadze (1928–2014)		10 March 1992	4 November 1992	239 days	Independent	Chairman of the State Council
—	Eduard Shevardnadze (1928–2014)		4 November 1992	6 November 1992	2 days	Independent	Chairman of the Parliament
—	Eduard Shevardnadze (1928–2014)		6 November 1992	26 November 1995	3 years, 20 days	Independent	Head of State

=== President in dissidence (1993) ===
No.	Name (Birth–Death)	Portrait	Took office	Left office	Time in office	Party
—	Zviad Gamsakhurdia (1939–1993) (Note: During the Georgian Civil War, deposed former president Gamsakhurdia returned to Georgia in September 1993 and formed a rival government based in Zugdidi. This controlled part of western Georgia until its defeat at the hands of government forces in November.)		24 September 1993	6 November 1993	43 days	Round Table—Free Georgia

== See also ==
- Presidential Administration of Georgia
- Prime Minister of Georgia
