= Constitution of Georgia (country) =

Supreme law of Georgia

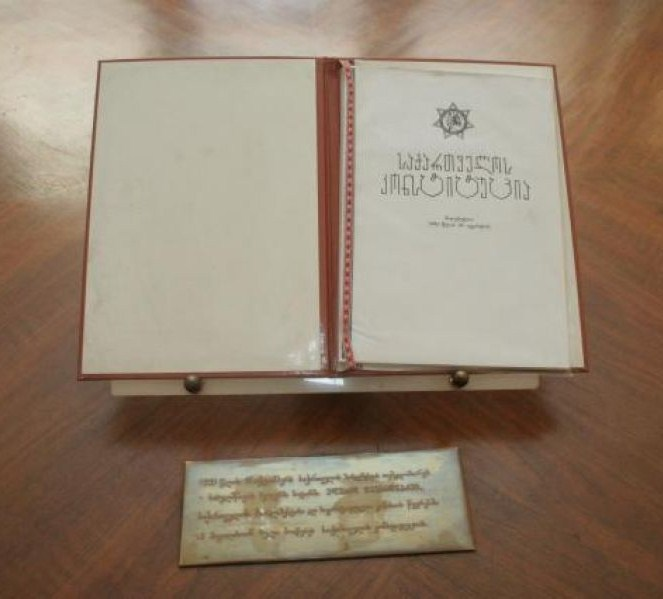
- Constitution of Georgia In The Parliament

Overview
- Original title: საქართველოს კონსტიტუცია
- Jurisdiction: Georgia
- Created: 2 July 1995
- Ratified: 24 August 1995; 30 years ago
- Date effective: 17 October 1995
- System: Unitary parliamentary republic (according to the last Amendment)

Government structure
- Branches: Three (executive, legislature and judiciary)
- Chambers: Unicameral (Note: The Parliament of Georgia is a unicameral legislature. The Constitution envisages, following the full restoration of Georgia's jurisdiction throughout the entire territory of Georgia (including breakaway Abkhazia and South Ossetia, designated by Georgia as Russian-occupied territories), creation of a bicameral parliament: the Council of the Republic and the Senate. See more.)
- Executive: Prime Minister-led Cabinet of Ministers responsible to the Parliament; President as ceremonial head of state (according to the last Amendment)
- Judiciary: Supreme, Appellate, City/Magistrate; Constitutional

History
- Amendments: 36
- Last amended: 29 June 2020
- Location: The Parliament of Georgia
- Author: State Constitutional Commission of Georgia
- Signatories: The members of State Constitutional Commission and Parliament of Georgia

Full text
- Constitution of Georgia (2018) at Wikisource
- საქართველოს კონსტიტუცია at Georgian Wikisource

The Constitution of Georgia (Georgian: საქართველოს კონსტიტუცია, sakartvelos k'onst'it'utsia) is the supreme law of the nation of Georgia. It was approved by the Parliament of Georgia on 24 August 1995 and entered into force on 17 October 1995. The Constitution replaced the Decree on State Power of November 1992 which had functioned as an interim basic law following the dissolution of the Soviet Union.

== Background ==
=== Democratic Republic of Georgia and Soviet Rule ===
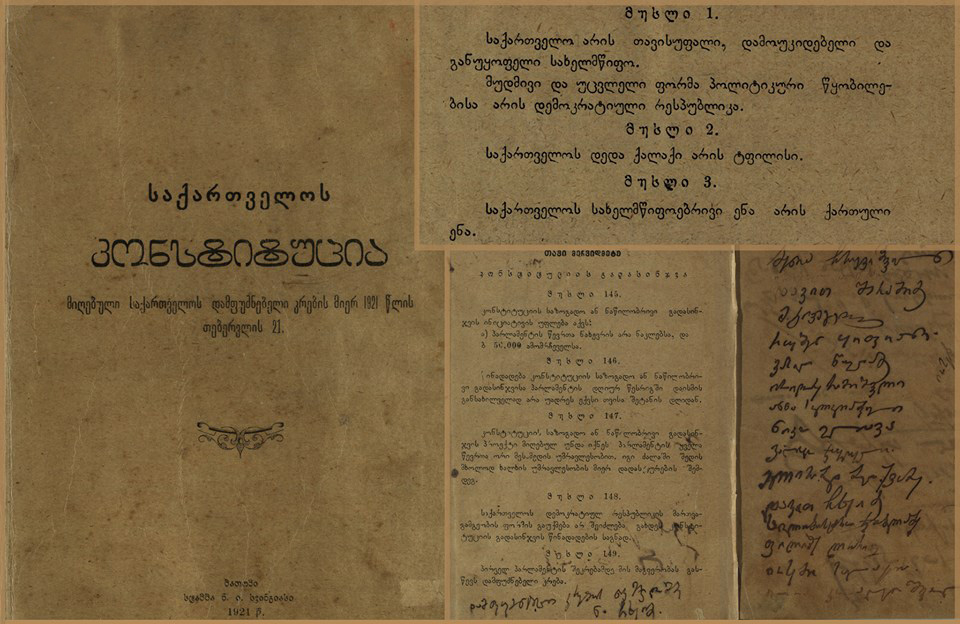
Fragments of the Constitution of 1921

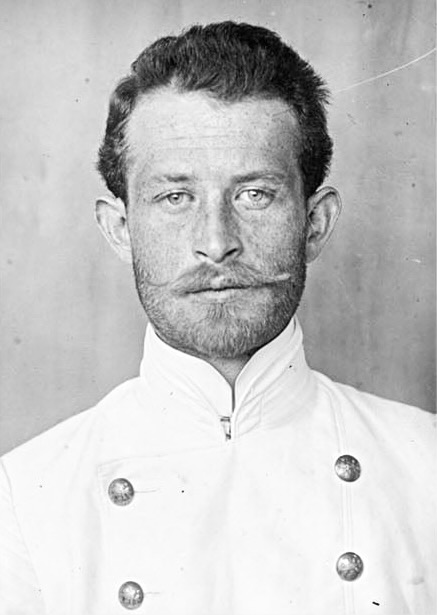
Samson Dadiani, shaped the first-ever constitution of Georgia

The history of Georgian constitutionalism begins in the twentieth century, when on 26 May 1918, the Democratic Republic of Georgia adopted the Act of Independence and began drafting the Constitution. The drafting of the constitution lasted for three years. On 21 February 1921, facing the onset of Soviet aggression, the Constituent Assembly of Georgia adopted a constitution of the Democratic Republic of Georgia which was the first modern fundamental law in the nation's history, but which, in fact, failed to fulfill its function and lasted only four days. Georgia then adopted four Soviet constitutions in 1922, 1927, 1937, and 1978, which were typical Soviet constitutions and did not differ in any way from the constitutions of the Russian Soviet Federal Socialist Republic.

The attempt to remove the constitutional status of Georgian SSR in 1978 caused a major political crisis. The proposal was ultimately withdrawn by the Soviet government.

=== After the restoration of independence ===
On 28 October 1990, the first multi-party elections of the Supreme Council of the Georgian SSR were held in Georgia. Just 16 days after the election, the Supreme Council made a number of changes to the still-in-force 1978 Soviet constitution. The words "Soviet Socialist" were removed from the name of the country and the state was renamed "Republic of Georgia", state symbols were changed, the leading role of the Communist Party was abolished and political pluralism was introduced.

At the end of 1991, the powers of the Supreme Council of Georgia, the President of the Republic and the Government were terminated in an unconstitutional manner. On 6 January 1992, the Military Council of the Republic of Georgia (Triumvirate) and the Provisional Government were established. The Military Council repealed the revised Soviet transitional constitution and legislation, and on 21 February 1992 adopted the Declaration on the Restoration of the 1921 Constitution. In the same year, the Military Council was dissolved and the State Council of the Republic of Georgia was established. The restored constitution of 1921 suffered even worse fate than it had in 1921 - it did not actually take effect on any day because it was out of step with modernity and time.

=== Short constitution ===
On 6 November 1992, the Parliament of the Republic of Georgia adopted the Law on State Power, known as the Small Constitution. At that time, this law turned out to be the only act that could replace a basic law in a country left without a constitution.

== History ==
=== Drafting ===
On 16 February 1993, the Speaker of the Parliament of Georgia, head of state Eduard Shevardnadze submitted to the Parliament a proposal to establish a State Constitutional Commission of Georgia, which was to draft not a new constitution, but a draft of the new version of the 1921 Constitution.

On 25 March 1993, the Parliament of Georgia adopted a resolution on the establishment of the State Constitutional Commission of Georgia and the approval of its Statute. On the basis of this statute, Eduard Shevardnadze, Chairman of the Parliament of Georgia and the Head of State, was elected as the Chairman of the State Constitutional Commission. Prof. Givi Intskirveli, Dean of the Faculty of Law of Tbilisi State University and Vakhtang Khmaladze were elected as his deputies. Prof. Avtandil Demetrashvili was elected as the secretary of the commission. The Constitutional Commission included members of the parliament, lawyers, economists, historians, the President and academicians of the Georgian Academy of Sciences and professors of Tbilisi State University, a total of 118 members.

Working groups of the Constitutional Commission
Group	Head
Analysis of the 1921 Constitution	Levan Toidze
Analysis of Ongoing Legislative Activities	Constantine Kemularia
Legislative Issues	David Melikishvili
Issues of Constitutional Oversight	Johnny Khetsuriani
Judicial Issues	Mindia Ugrekhelidze
Socio-economic relations issues	Vladimer Papava
Security and Defense Issues	Nodar Natadze
Foreign Affairs Issues	Tedo Patarashvili
National Minority Issues	Zurab Zhvania
International Law and Legislation of Foreign Countries	Levan Aleksidze
Preamble Issues	Mikheil Naneishvili
Human Rights Issues	Kartlos Gharibashvili
Executive Issues	Tedo Ninidze
Political and suffrage issues	David Kupreishvili
Territorial arrangement issues	Irakli Shengelaia

According to one of the resolutions of the Parliament, the projects developed by the working groups were to be united with the editorial team; The final version of the Constitution was to be adopted first by the State Constitutional Commission and then by the Parliament of Georgia. The draft adopted in this way was to be put to a universal vote - the constitution was to be adopted by the people. During the working prosses, some substantial changes were made to this plan. Instead of adopting the 1921 Constitution, it was decided to adopt a completely new Constitution. Various conferences and seminars were organized by the Secretariat of the Commission in 1993–1995 to study the problems in depth and take into account the experience of the states. The Secretariat was actively assisted by the Venice Commission.

In early 1995, in addition to Eduard Shevardnadze's draft, the Constitutional Commission already had 12 drafts submitted by various political groups, organizations and citizens. All the projects were studied in more or less detail at different levels of the commission, there was also an attempt to develop a reconciled version.

=== Ratification ===
In May 1995, the final discussions began at the plenary sessions of the Constitutional Commission. The discussion was based on the draft presented by Eduard Shevardnadze. On 2 July, the State Constitutional Commission passed the draft by 64 votes against 4 and submitted it to the Parliament of Georgia for approval.

The forms of state arrangement established by the Constitutional Commission turned out to be unacceptable for the parliament. The first principles of the arrangement were removed from the draft constitution, and then the form of semi-presidential republic was changed to a version similar to the presidential republic.

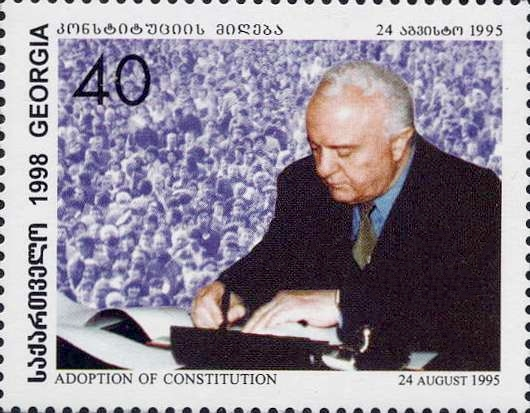
1998 postage stamp commemorating the signing of the constitution by Eduard Shevardnadze

On 24 August 1995, at 5:50 pm, the Parliament of the Republic of Georgia adopted the Constitution of Georgia by 159 votes to 8. On 17 September 1995, members of the State Constitutional Commission and the Parliament of Georgia signed the official text of the Constitution at the Government House, where the Supreme Council of the Republic of Georgia proclaimed the Act on the Restoration of Georgia's Independence.

== 2004 Amendments ==
On 4 January, Mikhail Saakashvili won the Georgian presidential election, 2004 with an overwhelming majority of 96 percent of the votes cast. Constitutional amendments were rushed through Parliament in February strengthening the powers of the president to dismiss parliament and creating the post of prime minister. Zurab Zhvania was appointed prime minister and Nino Burjanadze, the interim president, became speaker of parliament.

== 2010 Amendments ==
On 15 October 2010, the Parliament of Georgia adopted with 112 votes to five major amendments to the constitution, which significantly reduced powers of the president of Georgia in favor of the prime minister and the government. The new constitution went into force upon the 17 November 2013 inauguration of Giorgi Margvelashvili, the winner of the 2013 presidential election.

== 2017–2018 Amendments ==
On 26 September 2017, the Parliament of Georgia adopted the much-debated constitutional amendments with 117 voting in favor and two against. The vote was boycotted by the opposition. According to the new legislation, direct presidential elections are to be abolished and the country will transfer to fully proportional parliamentary representation in 2024. On 9 October, President Giorgi Margvelashvili vetoed the amendments and returned the draft bill to the Parliament with his objections, but the Parliament overrode the veto and approved the initial version on 13 October. Further amendments, incorporating several Venice Commission-recommended changes, were adopted on 21 March 2018.

The following amendments were in the constitution.

- The president is no longer elected directly by the people, instead by a parliamentary committee.
- Define marriage as "a union between a woman and a man for the purpose of creating a family".
- Agricultural land is a "resource of exceptional significance" and can be owned only by "the state, a self-governing entity, a citizen of Georgia, or a union of Georgian citizens".

== See also ==
- Constitutional economics
- Constitutionalism
