= List of ambassadors of Georgia to Russia =

Coordinates: 55.754181°N 37.644828°E

Ambassador of Georgia (country) to Russia Embassy of Georgia, Moscow (liquidated)
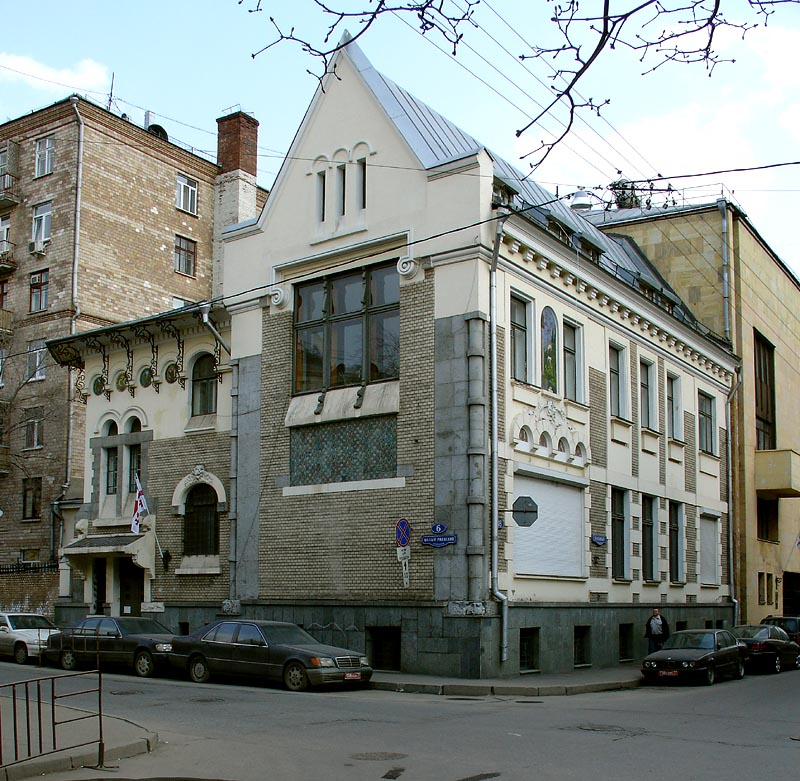
- Incumbent vacant since July 11, 2008
- Inaugural holder: Prince Levan of Georgia
- Formation: 1770

The Georgian ambassador in Moscow was the official representative of the Government in Tbilisi to the Government of Russia.

== List of representatives ==
Diplomatic accreditation	ambassador	Georgian language	Observations	Prime Minister of Georgia	Prime Minister of Russia	Term end
1770	Prince Levan of Georgia (1756–1781)	ka:ლევან ბატონიშვილი (ერეკლე II-ის ძე)		Heraclius II of Georgia	Catherine the Great	February 5, 1781
1784	Garsevan Chavchavadze	ka:ალეგარსევან ჭავჭავაძექსანდრე ლომაია		Heraclius II of Georgia	Catherine the Great	1801
1991	Alexander Lomaia	ka:ალექსანდრე ლომაია		Besarion Gugushvili	Boris Yeltsin	1991
April 1993	Valerian Advadze	ვალერიან ადვაძე	Zviad Gamsakhurdia gained the most votes (86% or 2,565,362 votes), followed by Valerian Advadze (8% or 240,243 votes),	Eduard Shevardnadze	Boris Yeltsin	January 1995
1995	Vazha Lortkipanidze	ვაჟა ლორთქიფანიძე		Otar Patsatsia	Boris Yeltsin	August 1998
September 1998	Malkhaz Kakabadze	მალხაზ კაკაბაძე	under Shevardnadze he was minister of special affairs responsible for the peace process.	Vazha Lortkipanidze	Boris Yeltsin	May 2000
July 2000	Zurab Abashidze	ზურაბ აბაშიძე		Giorgi Arsenishvili	Vladimir Putin	February 2004
February 2004	Konstantin Kemularia	კონსტანტინე კემულარია	1992-1993 he was head of the Ministry of Justice of Georgia, in 2001 he was Deputy Chairman of the Parliamentary Committee on Human Rights	Zurab Zhvania	Vladimir Putin	July 2004
August 2004	Valeriy Chechelashvili	ვალერი ჩეჩელაშვილი		Zurab Zhvania	Vladimir Putin	February 2005
July 2005	Irakli Chubinishvili	ირაკლი ჩუბინიშვილი		Zurab Noghaideli	Vladimir Putin	February 2008
February 2008	Erosi Kitsmarishvili	ეროსი კიწმარიშვილი		Lado Gurgenidze	Dmitry Medvedev	July 11, 2008
