= Irakli Chubinishvili =

Georgian diplomat

Irakli Chubinishvili ირაკლი ჩუბინიშვილი

Georgia Ambassador to Russia
- In office July 2005 – February 2008
- President: Mikheil Saakashvili; Nino Burjanadze (acting); Mikheil Saakashvili
- Preceded by: Valeriy Chechelashvili
- Succeeded by: Erosi Kitsmarishvili

Irakli Chubinishvili (Georgian: ირაკლი ჩუბინიშვილი) (Irakli Chubini) is a former Ambassador Extraordinary and Plenipotentiary of the Republic of Georgia to the Russian Federation.

Previously a member of Zurab Zhvania's United Democrats Party, in February 2004, he was appointed by Georgian president Mikhail Saakashvili to the position of Chief of his administration. On 20 April 2005, the Georgian parliament approved the nomination of Chubinishvili to the post of ambassador of Georgia to Russia, a post he held until his resignation in January 2008. His replacement to the post in Moscow is Erosi Kitsmarishvili. After resignation Irakli Chubinishvili has moved to the United Kingdom and is involved in the private business consultancy.

== See also ==
- Embassy of Georgia in Moscow
