= Georgia–Russia relations =

- Georgia: Russia

Diplomatic mission
- Former Embassy of Georgia, Moscow (Note: On 29 August 2008, Georgia broke diplomatic relations with Russia and withdrew all its diplomats from Russia): Former Embassy of Russia, Tbilisi

Bilateral relations between Georgia and Russia date back hundreds of years and remain complicated despite certain religious and historical ties that exist between the two countries and their people.

Contacts between Russia and Georgia date back to the 15th and 16th centuries, and the most important stage started in the 1580s, when the Georgian kingdom of Kakheti and the Russian Empire signed a treaty of alliance in 1587. Relations between the two countries developed vibrantly and culminated in the Treaty of Georgievsk, which established eastern Georgia as a protectorate of Russia. At that time, Georgia saw Russia as a powerful Christian and modernizing neighbor, capable of protecting Georgia from invading Muslim empires and North Caucasian raiders.

Although Russia did help Georgia ward off North Caucasian invasions, it failed to protect Georgia when Persia invaded in 1795. Catherine the Great later imposed punitive measures against Persia, but they were cut short by her death. In 1800, Emperor Paul I signed a proclamation on the incorporation of eastern Georgia into the Russian Empire, which was finalized the following year by Tsar Alexander I. This was followed by the annexation by Russia of western Georgian kingdoms and principalities and their incorporation into the Russian Empire, namely the Kingdom of Imereti in 1810, the Principality of Guria in 1829, the Principality of Svaneti in 1858, and the Principality of Mingrelia in 1867.

Incorporation into the empire ended Muslim invasions and brought peace to Georgia. The Russian Empire ended the slave trade by the Ottomans in western Georgia, which saved Georgia's shrinking population from demographic catastrophe. It also provided Georgia with means for a cultural revival, such as the Tiflis Imperial Theater, which was opened in 1852 and revitalized Georgia's long-abandoned theatrical tradition. Georgian intellectuals pursued their education at the universities in Moscow and Saint Petersburg and brought new ideas to Georgia. However, the loss of sovereignty and abolition of the autocephalous status of the Georgian Orthodox Church, along with the Russification policy, gave rise to public discontent and rebellions. As a result of the Russo-Turkish wars of 1828–1829 and 1877–1878, Russia acquired the historical southern Georgian provinces, such as Adjara and Meskheti, from the Ottomans.

The unification of historical Georgian lands under the Russian Empire and the national consolidation of Georgia gave rise to Georgian nationalism, spearheaded by the "Tergdaleulebi" movement, a group of Russian-educated Georgian intellectuals led by Ilia Chavchavadze who brought modern nationalist ideas into Georgia. They campaigned against Russification and promoted national identity among Georgians through "Society for the Spreading of Literacy among Georgians" and the newspaper Iveria. Their vision did not envisage an outright revolt for independence but demanded autonomy within the reformed Russian Empire, with greater cultural freedom, promotion of the Georgian language, and support for Georgian educational institutions and the national church. This movement instilled a strong sense of national cohesiveness among Georgians, which were divided between various Georgian regional feudal kingdoms and Muslim empires throughout the Middle Ages, and paved the path to independence, which Georgia regained following the collapse of the Russian Empire in 1917. The Menshevik government of Georgia transformed the image of Bolshevik-led Russia from a source of enlightenment into an Asiatic state imbued with oriental backwardness and sought ties with the West through its links to Second International. The short-lived Georgian independence ended when Georgia was incorporated into the Soviet Union as the Georgian Soviet Socialist Republic in 1922.

When Georgia and the Russian Federation achieved independence in 1991, bilateral Russo-Georgian ties were once again strained due to Moscow's support of separatist regions within Georgia, Georgia's independent energy policies, and most recently, its intentions to join NATO. Russo-Georgian relations briefly began to improve during Eduard Shevardnadze's presidency, but they became strained again after the Rose Revolution in Georgia. The tensions led to the Russo-Georgian War in August 2008, and diplomatic relations were broken. To this day, the two countries have maintained no formal diplomatic relations.

== Relations before 1991 ==
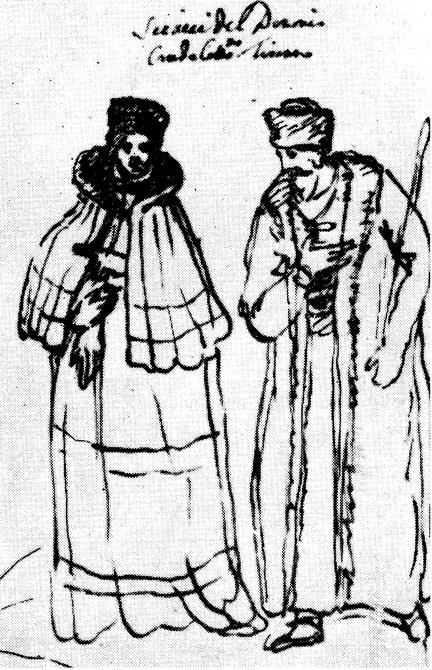
Russian ambassadors at the court of the King of Imereti (1651), by Teramo Castelli.

Following the fall of Constantinople, throughout the early modern period, Georgians became politically fractured and were dominated by the Ottoman Empire and successive dynasties of Iran. Georgians started looking for allies and found the Russians on the political horizon as a replacement for their long-lost Orthodox ally, the Byzantine Empire, "for the sake of the Christian faith". The Georgian kings and Russian tsars exchanged no less than 17 embassies from the 16th to the 18th centuries, which ultimately culminated in the first formal alliance between Georgia and Russia in 1783, when King Heraclius II of Eastern Georgia (Kartli-Kakheti) signed the Treaty of Georgievsk with the Russian Empire.

Despite Russia's vowing to defend Eastern Georgia, it rendered no assistance when the Persians invaded in 1795, as they sought to reestablish their traditional suzerainty over the region. It was only belatedly that Catherine the Great of Russia put in place punitive measures against Persia, only to be cut short by her death and the enthronement of Paul against the Empress' wishes. Lacking his mother's experience and tactfulness, in December 1800, Paul signed the proclamation on the annexation of Georgia to the Russian Empire, which was finalized by a decree on January 8, 1801, and confirmed by Tsar Alexander I on September 12, 1801. The Georgian ambassador in Russia reacted with a note of protest that was presented to the Russian vice chancellor Prince Kurakin, but despite this, in May 1801, Russian General Karl Knorring officially enforced Russian control of the kingdom and instituted a government headed by General Ivan Petrovich Lasarev. By this, Persia officially lost control over the Georgian lands it had been ruling for centuries.

The Georgian nobility did not accept the decree until April 1802, when General Knorring surrounded the nobility in Tbilisi's Sioni Cathedral and forced them to take an oath on the Imperial Crown of Russia. Those who disagreed were temporarily arrested. This was followed by the dethronement and exile of the Georgian monarch, as well as the head of the church, to St. Petersburg in what was viewed in Georgia as a violation of the Georgievsk Treaty.

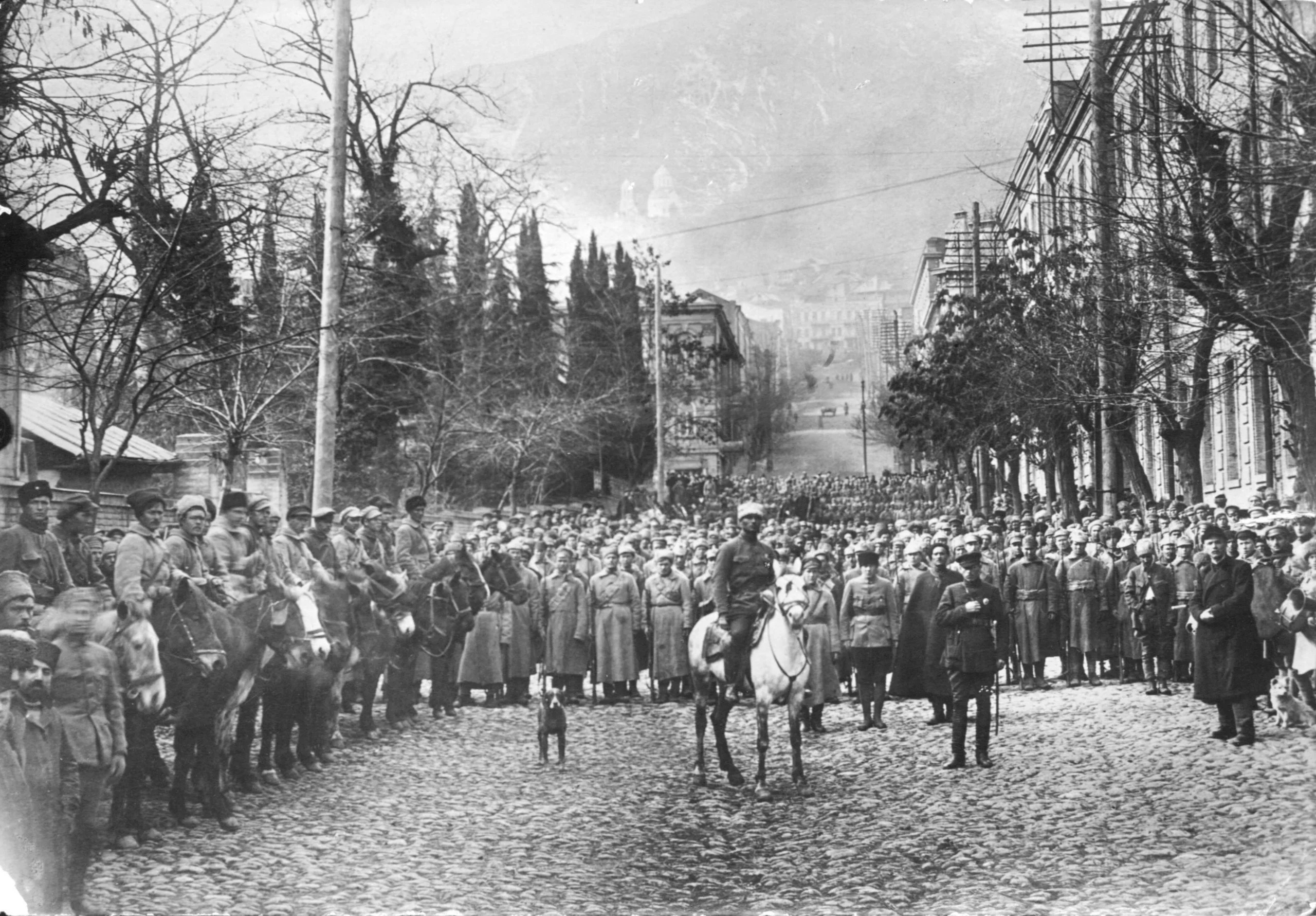
The 11th Red Army of the Russian SFSR occupies Tbilisi, February 25, 1921.

Having spent more than a century as part of the Russian Empire, in 1918 Georgia regained independence and established the First Republic. In 1921, Georgia was invaded and occupied by Bolshevik Russia to form the Soviet Union in 1922. Georgian Joseph Stalin was the leader of the USSR from 1928 to 1953.

== Relations from Georgian independence to the Rose Revolution (1991–2003) ==
In a March 1991 referendum, Georgia voted for independence by an overwhelming margin. However, the vote was largely boycotted by non-Georgians in South Ossetia and Abkhazia, inflaming the existing war in South Ossetia, and setting the stage for the forthcoming war in Abkhazia. Georgia declared independence from the USSR on 9 April 1991.

=== South Ossetia war (1991–1992) ===
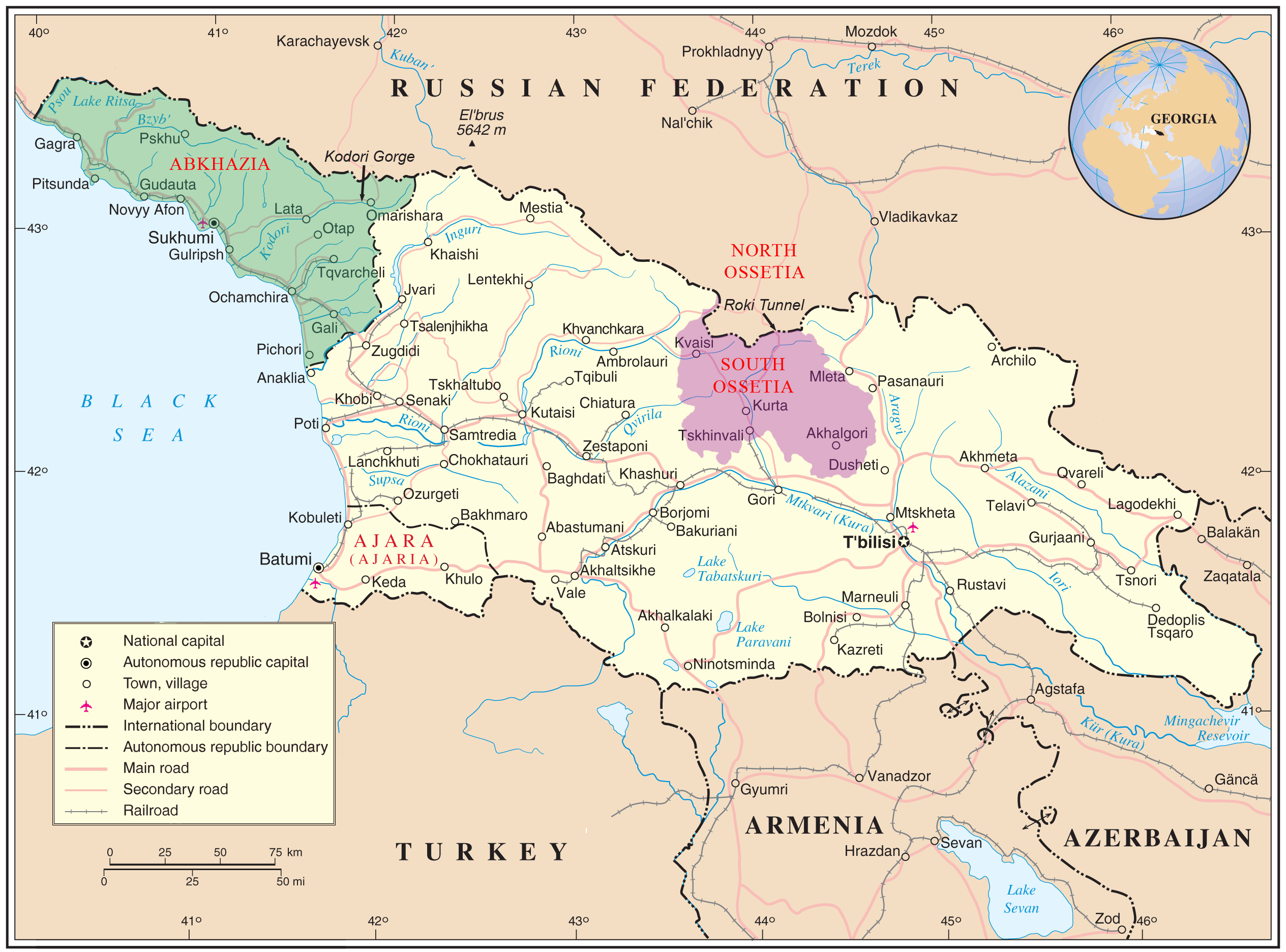
A map of Georgia with South Ossetia shaded purple and Abkhazia shaded green.

The South Ossetian Oblast Soviet, a local government body, had preemptively declared independence from Georgia in March 1990, within the framework of the USSR. The declaration was immediately denounced by the leadership of the Georgian SSR.

Ethnic violence pitting Georgians against South-Ossetians escalated around December 1990. The most intense period of fighting, in March and April 1991, begun before the referendum, and continued after the declaration of independence.

Georgian forces were ultimately were beaten back by local fighters backed by "irregulars from the Russian Federation, and stranded ex-Soviet soldiers who found themselves stuck in the middle of someone else's civil war and chose to fight on behalf of the secessionists."

=== War in Abkhazia (1992–1993) ===
The tensions between Georgia and Russia, which had been heightened even before the collapse of the Soviet Union, climaxed during the secessionist conflict in Abkhazia in 1992–93. Support for the Abkhaz from various groups within Russia, such as the Confederation of Mountain Peoples of the Caucasus and Cossacks, as well as Russian regular military units stationed in Abkhazia, contributed to the worsening of Georgia–Russia relations.

On September 3, 1992, Russia invited both sides of the conflict to take part in the negotiations in Moscow. Formally, it was a negotiation between Russia and Georgia, two sovereign states. However, it served as a forum for the Abkhaz and Georgian sides to discuss the ongoing conflict, while Russia saw its role as a mediator, not a party. Russian president Boris Yeltsin and Head of State Council of the Republic of Georgia Eduard Shevardnadze signed an agreement, formally known as the Summary Document of the Moscow Meeting. According to the agreement, a Monitoring and Inspection Commission composed of representatives appointed by the authorities of Georgia, including Abkhazia, and Russia should have been established. Russian military forces stationed in Abkhazia should have maintained neutrality throughout the conflict. The Abkhaz militias should have been disbanded. Only the agreed level of Georgian troops should have remained in the conflict zone required for the protection of the railway and certain other installations.

Georgian troops began leaving the conflict area. In the meantime, however, on September 25, the Supreme Council of the Russian Federation adopted a resolution proposed by Sergey Baburin, which denounced Georgia's policy in Abkhazia. Russia suspended the delivery of weapons and equipment to Tbilisi. Georgia's leadership identified this resolution as interference in Georgia's internal affairs. The resolution is considered to have encouraged an Abkhaz offensive in October in violation of the September 3 agreement. However, the Abkhaz side blamed Georgia for violating the ceasefire first and claimed that it only acted in self-defense.

After the Battle of Gagra in October 1992, military operations resumed. Shevardnadze denounced "reactionary forces" in Russia for encouraging the Abkhaz offensive. Yeltsin rejected Georgian charges of Russian interference in Georgia's internal affairs but warned that Russia will take action if Russian lives and property are threatened.

On December 17, 1992, the Georgian parliament blamed the Russian Federation for interfering in Georgia's internal affairs. It was noted that Russian troops took part in the bombing of Sokhumi and its outskirts on December 2 and 9. They also downed a helicopter of Georgian air forces on October 5 and Georgia's Su-25 on October 13. Other facts concerning Russian involvement in the conflict were also mentioned. It was the first occasion when Georgia officially noted that Russian armed forces stationed in Abkhazia were involved in the conflict on the Abkhaz side and fought against the territorial integrity of Georgia.

On November 2, Georgian units seized a Russian arms depot in southern Georgia. The Russian parliament adopted a resolution on December 25, 1992. It blamed Georgia for violating the terms of the agreement concerning the legal status of Russian armed forces on the territory of the Republic of Georgia. It recommended that the Russian president and government impose sanctions on Georgia if it failed to maintain the security of Russian citizens and property of the Russian Federation on the territory of the Republic of Georgia.

During the battle of Gumista on March 16, 1993, the Georgian side accused the Russian air force of supporting the Abkhaz offensive. On March 17, the Georgian parliament addressed the UN, European Parliament, world parliaments, and Supreme Soviet of the Russian Federation. It demanded the withdrawal of Russian forces from Abkhazia and stated that Russia waged "an undeclared war" against Georgia. The Russian side denied involvement in the conflict.

During the March 19 air raid on Sokhumi, Georgian forces succeeded in downing an SU-27 fighter-bomber. A UN military observer confirmed that the aircraft belonged to the Russian air forces. The Georgian side once again blamed Russia for aiding the Abkhaz.

On April 1, the Georgian Parliament adopted a resolution that openly blamed Russia for the political facilitation of ethnic cleansing and genocide against Georgians.

On April 6–9, negotiations were held between Russia and Georgia. The topic of the withdrawal of Russian armed forces from Abkhazia was discussed.

On April 27, the Georgian parliament adopted a new resolution. It emphasized Russian involvement in the conflict on the Abkhaz side against the Republic of Georgia. It also blamed the Supreme Soviet of the Russian Federation for adopting resolutions that violate Georgia's sovereignty. It stated that Russia was responsible for violations of the Moscow agreement and obstruction of the Sochi talks. It was determined that Head of State Eduard Shevardnadze should have addressed the Russian president about the withdrawal of Russian military units from Abkhazia. If Russia refused to withdraw its forces, the Georgian parliament would have proclaimed the area between the Gumista River and the Russian–Georgian border to be occupied by Russia. It called on the Head of the State, the Georgian Foreign Ministry, and representatives in international organizations to take appropriate steps.

On May 14, Yeltsin and Shevardnadze met to negotiate a settlement in Abkhazia and sign a ceasefire agreement. Georgia and Russia agreed that all Russian military forces would withdraw from Georgia by the end of 1995. On May 20, a ceasefire agreement was signed in Moscow.

On July 27, a new ceasefire was signed in Sochi. The gradual demilitarization of the area should have taken place. A Russian-Georgian-Abkhaz control group should have been established to monitor the ceasefire. Georgian military forces began withdrawing from the conflict area on August 26.

On September 16, the ceasefire was again violated, and the battles resumed. The Abkhaz offensive aimed to capture Sokhumi. On September 17, the Georgian leadership met with Foreign Minister of Russia Pavel Grachev. He proposed for two Russian divisions to enter Sokhumi to secure peace. The Georgian side refused.

Russia adopted a resolution about the violation of the July 27 agreement. It said that if the Abkhaz side once again failed to fulfill the terms of the agreement, actions would have been taken against them in accordance with international law, and Russia would have suspended the supply of energy to Abkhazia. Yet Russian armed forces helped the Abkhaz in their offensive.

On September 28, after Georgians lost control over the Sokhumi, Shevardnadze claimed that Russian military authorities masterminded the Abkhaz rebel attack on Sukhumi. He blamed an anti-Yeltsin reactionary group in the Russian establishment for fighting against Georgia. In a letter to the UN, Shevardnadze referred to Russia as "the evil empire".

=== After the war ===
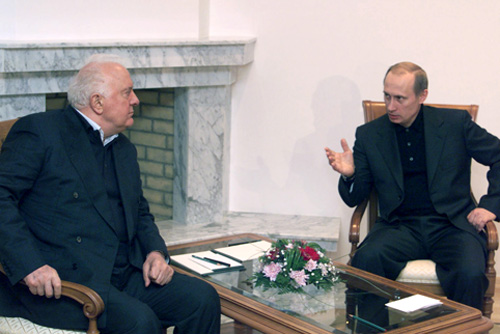
Vladimir Putin with Eduard Shevardnadze in 2002.

In the aftermath of the military setback in Abkhazia in 1993, the forces loyal to Zviad Gamsakhurdia, the first president of Georgia who was ousted as a result of the 1991–1992 Georgian coup d'état, launched an insurgency against the demoralized and unpopular government of Eduard Shevardnadze. In exchange for Russian military support against them, Shevardnadze agreed to join the Commonwealth of Independent States and legitimize the Russian military bases in Georgia: Vaziani Military Base, Gudauta, Akhalkalaki, and Batumi. 2,000 Russian troops were deployed to Georgia. Gamsakhurdia's rebellion was finally crushed in December 1993.

After Georgia agreed to join the CIS, relations between Russia and Georgia began to improve. Free trade agreements between Russia and Georgia were signed in 1993 and 1994. Russia supported economic sanctions on Abkhazia, based on a unanimous decision by the 12 presidents of the CIS member countries in January 1996 to ban trade, financial, transportation, communications, and other ties with Abkhazia at the state level by ministries and state-owned entities in the member countries. Georgian president Eduard Shevardnadze persuaded his Russian counterpart Boris Yeltsin to push through that decision, and all the CIS member countries supported it. However, already in November 1997, Russian prime minister Viktor Chernomyrdin partially lifted sanctions by easing import of curbs of citrus fruits and other foodstuffs from Abkhazia into Russia, which Eduard Shevardnadze denounced by stating that "I want to say to Russian citizens that those tangerines that will appear on their tables were collected in the yards of the burned-down houses of poor refugees".

At the Organization for Security and Co-operation in Europe Istanbul Summit of November 1999, agreement was reached that the Russian military bases in Georgia would all be evacuated by Russia before July 1, 2001.

Vaziani was handed over on June 29, 2001. Akhalkalaki was not handed over until June 27, 2007, and Batumi on November 13, 2007. Being in Abkhazia, the base at Gudauta has never been under the control of Georgia.

Russia dominated the collective peacekeeping missions in Abkhazia and South Ossetia but was criticized by Georgia and several Western diplomats for failing to maintain neutrality in the conflict zones.

=== Kodori Crisis and Pankisi Gorge crisis ===
In early 2000, Russian armed forces took Grozny from Chechen separatist forces, thus inaugurating the guerrilla phase of the Second Chechen War. Among the Chechen fighters who escaped Grozny was a group under the command of former Chechen Prime Minister Ruslan Gelayev, who led the group to the Pankisi Gorge, 25 miles inside Georgia, where they established camps.

In October 2001, a contingent led by Gelayev launched an attack on the Russian-backed, breakaway, statelet of Abkhazia. His troops appeared to have passed through more than 250 km of Georgia territory from Pankisi to the Kodori Valley, where the attack took place. Gelayev force was ultimately repelled by Abkhaz fighters and Russian airstrikes, leaving around 40 people dead, and a number of captives in Abkhaz hands.

Russia alleged that Georgia had facilitated the attack. Moscow demanded that Georgia extradite Gelayev, and suppress the rebels in Pankisi. Georgia was reluctant to do so, and claimed it could not find Gelayev.

During 2002, Russia's efforts to have the separatists expelled from Georgia constituted the mainstay of the Pankisi Gorge crisis, which dominated bilateral relations in that year. Russia claimed that Gelayev's men continued to mount raids into Russia, and there was evidence of at least one, at Itum-Kale, that July. In response, Russia bombed Georgian territory in or near Pankisi on several occasions, and threatened a more forceful intervention to root Gelayev out.

The George W. Bush administration in the United States was concerned, in the wake of the September 11 attacks, that jihadist operatives were also present in the Gorge, and wanted to cooperate with Russia on counter-terrorism. However, Bush also wished to forestall a Russian invasion of Georgia, and claimed that its alternative strategy was to provide training and equipment to Georgian special forces, so they could deal with the militants. A different Georgian force, the Internal Troops conducted four operations in Pankisi during 2002.

Under pressure, Gelayev's principal force left the Gorge in September 2002, and crossed onto Russian territory, where they were soon engaged at the Battle of Galashki. Other militants who had made their base in the valley, both Chechen and foreign, filtered out of the Gorge over the subsequent months. Nonetheless, in 2003 the Gorge became the centre of false claims by Russian and U.S. officials that Al-Qaeda operatives had manufactured the lethal nerve agent ricin in bases there. The notion was woven into the U.S.'s public case for the Iraq war.

== Relations after the Rose Revolution (2003–present) ==
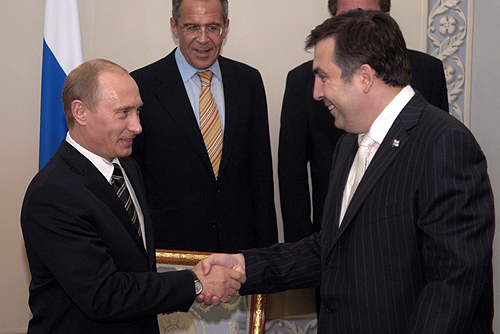
Vladimir Putin with Mikheil Saakashvili in 2006

=== Abkhazia ===
Speaking in a 2006 interview with a Russian newspaper, Georgian foreign minister Gela Bezhuashvili said that Georgia would try to create channels for "direct dialogue" with Abkhazia and South Ossetia alongside existing negotiating formats. "Russia has lost its role as a mediator in the Georgian–Abkhazian conflict; Georgians are not Russian people" according to Bezhuashvili. He also said that UN monitoring of the Kodori Gorge, which was suspended three years earlier, could resume within "two or three weeks" once security has been established. The following is the text of the interview published by Vremya Novostey on August 4:

Russian–Georgian relations are going through a crisis. The Georgian operation in Abkhazia's Kodori Gorge led Moscow to accuse Georgia of violating earlier agreements. Tbilisi responded by accusing Moscow of supporting separatists. The day before yesterday, in the evening, the first casualties occurred among the Russian peacekeepers since the situation intensified: Maksim Basenko and Vladimir Vasilchuk were shot dead in the Gudauta District. Their deaths are most likely connected with the criminal world, since the peacekeepers were escorting a large sum of money for the payment of wages. The Abkhaz authorities are conducting an investigation. But Georgia perceives what happened as confirmation of the complex nature of the situation in the unrecognized republic.

The Georgian Foreign Ministry accuses Russian peacemakers of inactivity in the conflict zone of Abkhazia. "Russian peacekeepers continue to act in defiance of their mandated obligations, turning a blind eye to gross violation of law and human rights taking place in their very presence", according to the Georgian Foreign Ministry.

According to the 2005–06 agreements, the withdrawal of Russian forces from Georgia was completed by January 1, 2008.

On March 1, 2025, Badra Gunba won the presidential election in Abkhazia, a Russian-backed region internationally recognized as part of Georgia. Gunba, who had been acting president since November 2024 after protests ousted his predecessor, secured nearly 55% of the vote. Georgia condemned the election as a violation of its sovereignty. Abkhazia, plagued by an electricity crisis and economic reliance on Russia, has seen repeated political unrest.

=== Spying row ===
Georgian–Russian relations deteriorated seriously during the September–October 2006 Georgia–Russia spying row, when Georgia detained four Russian officers on spying charges. Russia responded by imposing economic sanctions on Georgia and withdrawing its embassy from Tbilisi.

=== Deportation of Georgians ===
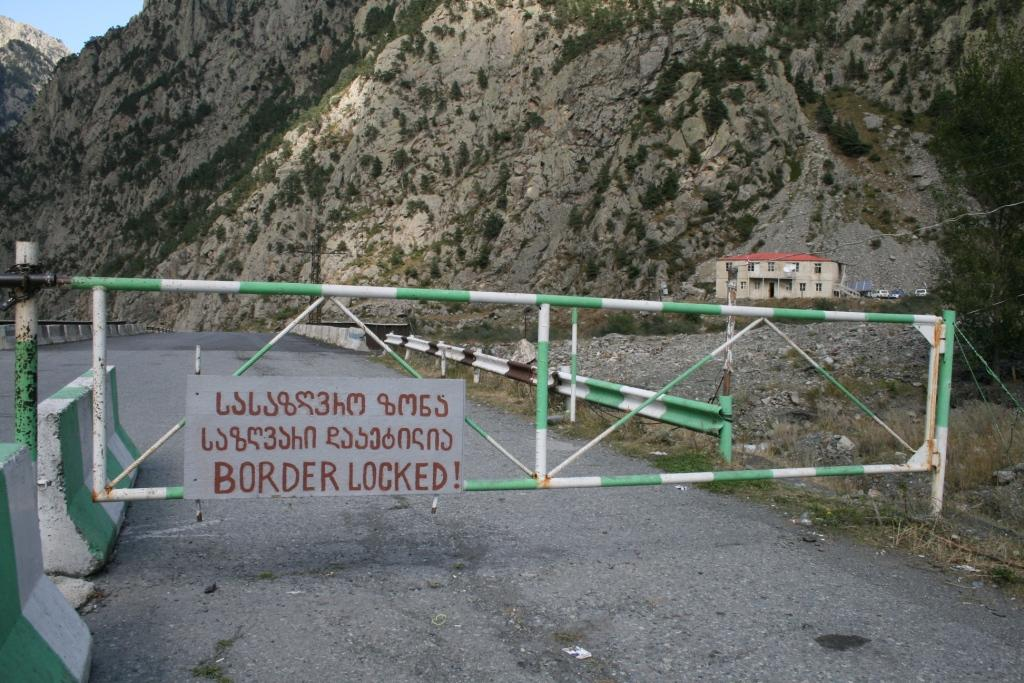
The Georgia–Russia border zone at Upper Lars has been closed since 2006

During the spying row, the Russian authorities started to deport Georgian citizens from Russia on charges of visa violations. The government of Georgia as well as influential human rights organizations such as Freedom House and Human Rights Watch accused the Russian authorities of "tolerating and encouraging the mistreatments of immigrants from Georgia and other Caucasus countries." and of "a deliberate campaign to detain and expel thousands of Georgians living in Russia." On March 27, 2007, Georgia filed an interstate lawsuit with the European Court of Human Rights over the cases of violations of the European Convention for the Protection of Human Rights and Fundamental Freedoms in the course of the deportation of Georgian citizens from Russia in the autumn of 2006. Russia described this as a "new unfriendly step taken against Russia".

=== 2007 alleged air space violations ===
==== Helicopter attack incident ====
In March, a village in the Georgian-controlled area of Abkhazia was attacked by three Russian helicopters, according to Georgia. Russia denied the allegations.

==== Tsitelubani missile incident ====
On August 7, 2007, a missile landed in the Georgian-controlled village of Tsitelubani, some 65 km north of Tbilisi. Georgian officials said that two Russian fighter jets violated its airspace and fired a missile, which fell on the edge of the village but did not explode. Georgian president Mikhail Saakashvili said the incident was part of a pattern of Russian aggression against its neighbors and urged European states to condemn Moscow. Georgia claimed to have radar evidence proving that the invading aircraft flew in from Russia and said that the strike had aimed, unsuccessfully, at destroying radar equipment recently installed near the South Ossetian conflict zone.

South Ossetian separatist leader Eduard Kokoity described the incident as "a provocation staged by the Georgian side, aimed at discrediting Russia", claiming that another bomb fell in South Ossetia. In his words, "a Georgian military plane crossed into South Ossetia on Monday, performed manoeuvres above Ossetian villages and dropped two bombs."

Russia also denied the Georgian claim. and said that Georgian jets may have fired the missile on their own territory as a way of provoking tensions in the region and derailing a session of the Joint Control Commission on Georgian–South Ossetian Conflict Resolution. Georgia immediately denounced the claim as absurd. South Ossetian officials as well as two Georgian opposition politicians also suggested that the Georgian authorities might have been behind the incident.

==== Plane downing incident ====
On 21 August 2007, a Georgian anti-aircraft system shot at a plane over Abkhazia. Abkhazia's breakaway government claimed that a plane was indeed downed but denies that it was shot down. It remained unclear who the downed plane belonged to, with various parties claiming that Russian, U.S., or Georgian planes may have been involved.

=== September 2007 controversy over the Russian ambassador's statement ===
On September 24, 2007, the Russian ambassador to Georgia, Vyacheslav Kovalenko, became embroiled in a controversy over his statement at a televised informal meeting with Georgian intellectuals organized by the Tbilisi-based Russian–Georgian Friendship Union in which he referred to the Georgian people as a "dying-out nation", and announced to the Georgians that they will soon become extinct in the face of globalization while Russia is "a large country, a huge country. It can digest this. You, the Georgians, will fail to digest this."

The statements sparked public outrage in Georgia, and Kovalenko was summoned by Georgia's Ministry of Foreign Affairs for explanations while the opposition factions in the Parliament of Georgia demanded the withdrawal of Kovalenko from Georgia. Georgian Parliamentary Chairperson, Nino Burjanadze, responded to the ambassador's prediction: "Maybe, certain forces in Russia really want to see the extinction of Georgian nation, but this will not happen... I would advise Mr. Kovalenko to think about Russia and its demographic problems and we will ourselves take care of Georgian problems, including the demographic ones."

=== 2007 Georgian demonstrations ===
In a televised address on the day of clashes between protesters and police in Tbilisi on November 7, 2007, Saakashvili said his country faced "a very serious threat of unrest". "High-ranking officials in Russian special services are behind this," he said, adding that he had evidence. He said several Russian diplomats would be expelled from Georgia for engaging in "espionage". Earlier, he had recalled Georgia's ambassador to Moscow, Irakly Chubinishvili, for "consultations".

=== 2008 crisis ===
==== April 2008 Georgian drone downing incident ====
On April 20, 2008, a Georgian unarmed aerial vehicle (UAV) was shot down over the Abkhazian conflict zone.

However, Georgia's defense ministry released video the next day showing what appears to be a Russian MiG-29 shooting down the unarmed Georgian drone. According to Georgia, the jet came from Gudauta and then returned to Russia. Moscow denied Georgia's accusation and stressed that none of its planes were in the region at the time. Furthermore, the Russian Ministry of Foreign Affairs issued a statement accusing Georgia of violating the 1994 Moscow agreement and United Nations resolutions on Abkhazia by deploying without authorization a UAV (which can also be used to direct fire) in the Security Zone and the Restricted Weapons Zone.

On April 24, a closed-door U.N. Security Council emergency session, convened at Georgia's request, failed to resolve the dispute, but the U.S., the United Kingdom, France, and Germany issued a joint statement expressing their concern over Russia's recent moves in Abkhazia and calling in Moscow to reverse or not implement its decision to legalize the ties with Abkhazia and South Ossetia. The Russian ambassador to the U.N., Vitaly Churkin, called the demand by the Western states "a tall order" and stressed that Russia had no intention of reversing its plans.

Although Moscow denies that a MiG-class fighter was involved in the incident, the Russian envoy to NATO, Dmitry Rogozin, has suggested that a MiG-29 belonging to a NATO member might have downed the Georgian spy plane. In response, NATO secretary general Jaap de Hoop Scheffer reportedly remarked that he would "eat his tie if it turned out that a NATO MiG-29 had magically appeared in Abkhazia and shot down a Georgian drone."

On May 26, 2008, the U.N. mission released the conclusion of its independent investigation into the incident. It confirmed that the Georgian video footage and radar data were authentic and that the jet that destroyed the drone was indeed Russian. The concluding report said that the jet flew towards Russian territory after the incident, but it was unclear where the attacker took off, naming the Gudauta base as a possible locality. The mission also noted that "a reconnaissance mission by a military aircraft, whether manned or unmanned, constituted 'military action' and therefore contravened the ceasefire accord". Georgia hailed the report, but Russia dismissed it.

==== Military buildup in Abkhazia ====
The UAV incident triggered a new rise in tensions between the two countries. Russia accused Georgia of trying to exploit NATO support to solve the Abkhazia problem by force and of sending its troops into the Georgia-controlled upper Kodori Valley in northeast Abkhazia. However, the U.N. monitors in Abkhazia stated earlier in April that they did not observe any military buildup on either side of the demilitarization line. On April 29, Russia announced it would increase its military presence in the region and threatened to retaliate militarily against Georgia's efforts. According to the Russian Ministry of Defense, it increased the number of its peacekeepers in Abkhazia to 2,542 peacekeepers, which is 458 short of the 3,000 limit set by agreement. The Georgian prime minister Lado Gurgenidze said Georgia would treat any additional troops in Abkhazia as aggressors, while President Saakashvili, in his televised address, pledged to pursue only a peaceful line in the conflict areas and called upon the Abkhaz and Ossetians to unite with Georgia in defying attempts by "outrageous and irresponsible external force to trigger bloodshed". The European Union also urged caution, saying that to increase troop numbers would be "unwise" given current tensions, while the United States called on Russia "to reconsider some provocative steps" it had taken in respect of Georgia's breakaway region of Abkhazia. Georgia also suspended the talks regarding Russia's admission to the World Trade Organization (WTO) and threatened to veto the process. Georgian officials claim Russia is changing facts on the ground in order to make it impossible for NATO foreign ministers to give Georgia a Membership Action Plan when they meet in December 2008. In the meantime, the Russian Cossacks and North Caucasian mountaineers declared their readiness to fight Georgia again in the case of a renewed confrontation in Abkhazia, as they did early in the 1990s. On May 6, 2008, the Georgian state minister for reintegration, Temur Iakobashvili, said Georgia was on the verge of war with Russia. Georgia requested the U.N. mission inquire into the number and deployment of the Russian peacekeeping troops in Abkhazia. The Russian Ministry of Defense claimed that the chief U.N. observer "agreed that actions by the Russian side do not contradict basic agreements on the conduct of the peacekeeping operation", but the mission later responded to this statement, declaring that it "has no authority to pronounce on the conformity between the CIS peacekeeping operation in the Zone of the Georgian-Abkhaz Conflict and CIS rules."

Early in May 2008, both the Russian and Abkhaz sides claimed that three more Georgian reconnaissance drones were shot over Abkhazia and declared that Georgia was preparing to mount an offensive into the region in the near future. The Abkhaz foreign minister, Sergei Shamba, asked Russia to place Abkhazia under Russia's military control in exchange for security guarantees. Georgia denied these allegations, stating that it was "a provocation aimed at propagandistic support of Russia's military intervention."

==== Russo-Georgian War ====
On August 8, 2008, after weeks of rising tensions, Georgian troops tried to retake the breakaway province and launched an offensive, including heavy bombardment of Tskhinvali. Russian forces entered South Ossetia and Abkhazia. After four days of intense fighting, Georgian forces were expelled from South Ossetia and Abkhazia. Russian paratroopers raided Georgian bases from Abkhazia. The Russian Air Force bombed military and logistical targets inside Georgia, and the Russian Navy entered Abkhazian waters and defeated the Georgian Naval Forces in a brief skirmish. Both sides agreed to a ceasefire on August 12, but the next day Russia violated that ceasefire, sending regular and paramilitary forces into Georgia proper. The Georgian Army retreated to defend Tbilisi, and the Russians took the main highway and the cities of Poti and Gori without a fight, removing or destroying any military equipment left behind and setting up "buffer zones" around the Abkhazian and South Ossetian borders, gradually withdrawing.

Georgia's military strength was damaged but quickly recovered, having reached a strength greater than pre-war levels in 2010. Russia stationed additional forces in South Ossetia and Abkhazia and built new military bases there.

==== Recognition of breakaway regions and severance of diplomatic relations ====
Russian military bases in South Ossetia as of 2015

On August 25, 2008, the Federal Assembly of Russia unanimously voted to urge President Medvedev to recognize Abkhazia and South Ossetia as independent states. On the following day, Medvedev agreed, signing a decree officially recognizing the two entities. Georgia has rejected this move outright as an annexation of its territory. In response to Russia's recognition of Abkhazia and South Ossetia, the Georgian government announced that the country would cut all diplomatic relations with Russia. Russia had already closed its embassy right after the beginning of the war in South Ossetia in August 2008, before diplomatic relations between the two countries ended.

=== Normalization ===
After the 2008 war, efforts were made to normalize relations between Russia and Georgia. In 2008, the Geneva International Discussions were established to enable security dialogue between Russia and Georgia mediated by the EU, the UN and the OSCE. Geneva process brought together representatives of Georgia, Russia, Georgia's breakaway Abkhazia and South Ossetia and the United States. In 2010, Georgia-Russia border crossing point at Zemo Larsi was reopened. In November 2011, a Georgian–Russian deal allowed Russia to proceed with its World Trade Organization (WTO) application. In February 2012, Georgian president Mikheil Saakashvili introduced visa-free regime for Russians visiting Georgia for 90 days. The time period was later extended to 1 year. In December 2012, Russian and Georgian representatives met in Prague and had the first two-way discussions after the war. In June 2013, Russia lifted the embargo on Georgian wine. Georgia resumed wine exports to Russia for the first time since 2006. In an attempt to improve relations, several Russian government-sponsored actors strengthened their presence in Georgia. In 2013, the Primakov Russian-Georgian/Georgian-Russian Public Center was founded with the support of the Gorchakov Fund. Also, opportunities to enhance people-to-people contacts have come from the Russkiy Mir Foundation, providing financial support to Georgian organisations through its grant program.

In March 2014, Georgia condemned the Russian annexation of Crimea, voicing support for Ukraine. Georgia imposed a ban on trade and financial transactions with Crimea alongside the European Union. However, it did not join Ukraine and Western countries in imposing wide-ranging sanctions on Moscow. By avoiding other sanctions, Georgia averted reciprocal steps by Russia.

In 2014, Russia invited Georgian president Giorgi Margvelashvili to visit Moscow. In an effort to thaw frozen conflicts over Abkhazia and South Ossetia, Georgia asked if they could be on the agenda for bilateral talks. The proposal was repeated in 2015. In both cases, Moscow demurred, and the visits never took place.

In October 2014, direct, regular flights between Georgia and Russia resumed. In 2015, Russian president Vladimir Putin stated that Moscow was ready to lift the visa requirement for Georgia. After a few days, Russia simplified visa procedures for Georgian citizens.

On March 9, 2018, Georgian prime minister Giorgi Kvirikashvili made a statement about the readiness of Georgia to normalize bilateral relations with Moscow. Kvirikashvili's proposal never went forward.

Despite relative success in terms of trade and tourism, as well as the resultant stability in the conflict area, which has helped to lower the risks of a new military conflict between the two countries, the normalization failed to put an end to the disputes over the breakaway regions. This led to public frustration in Georgia with the dialogue with Russia. The public survey showed that only 40 percent of Georgians supported dialogue with Russia, in sharp contrast with the 83 percent who backed it at the start of normalization. Georgian diplomat Zurab Abashidze has noted: "When we launched the new so-called Prague format in 2012... we, of course, wanted to restore both trade and transport links and solve humanitarian problems. But internally, emotionally, people expected that, having restored these practical ties, all these would somehow contribute to the solution of the most complex problems related to the territorial integrity of Georgia. That did not happen".

=== Protests of 2019 and aftermath ===
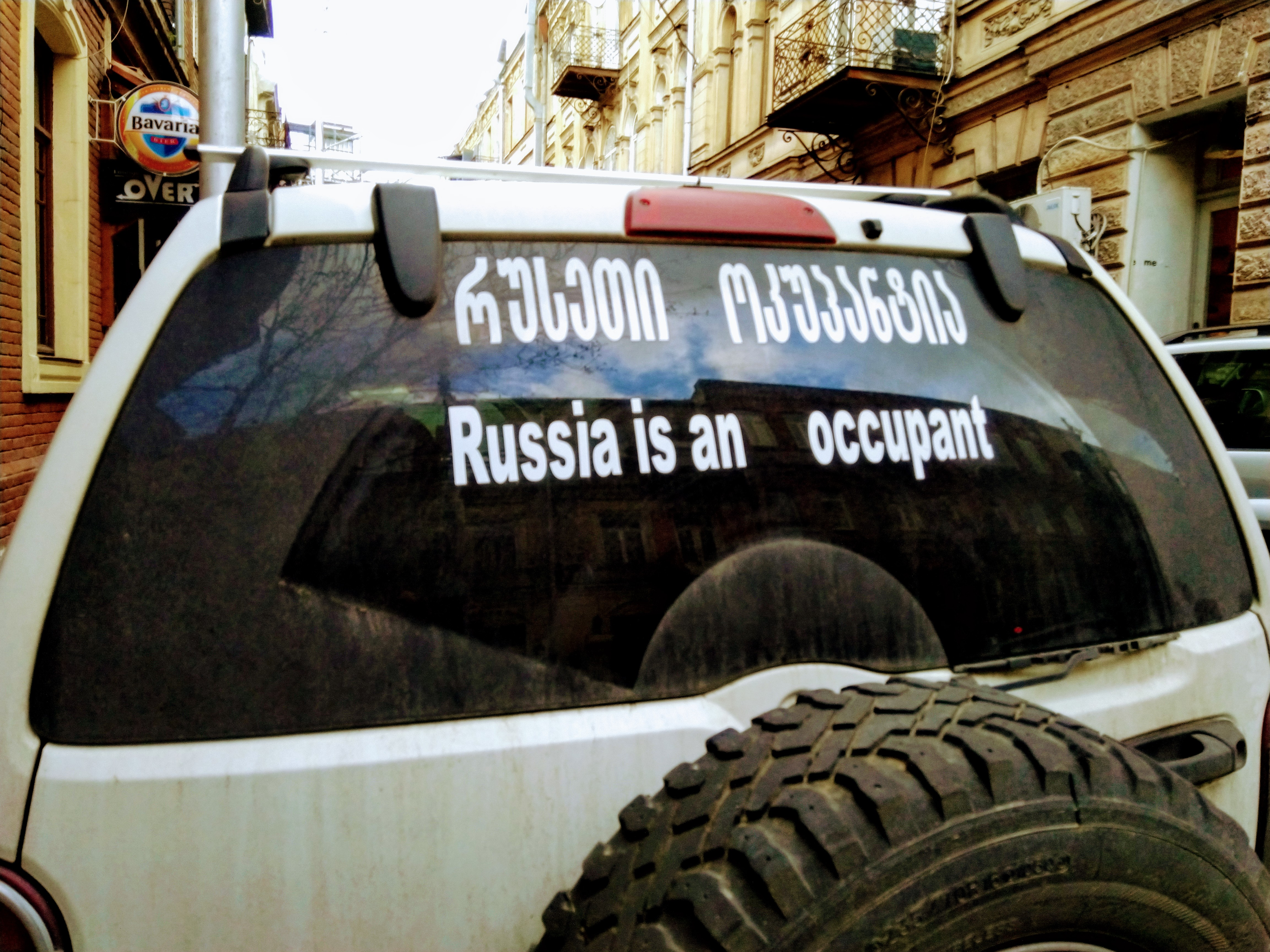
Protest sign in Tbilisi reads "Russia is an occupant".

On June 20, 2019, protests began to break out surrounding Georgia's parliament building over the visit of Russian politician Sergei Gavrilov, who was taking part in the Interparliamentary Assembly on Orthodoxy, an inter-parliamentary institution set up by the Greek parliament to foster relationships between Orthodox Christian lawmakers. This is in the aftermath of a speech given by Gavrilov in Russian from the Speaker's chair in Georgia's parliament building, extolling the Orthodox brotherhood of Georgia and Russia. The protests grew violent, and Georgian police suppressed them with tear gas and rubber bullets. The ensuing protests would result in a strain on relations between the two countries. Russia, in an apparent response, halted direct flights between the countries and increased regulation on Georgia's main exports to Russia: wine and mineral water.

Russia banned direct passenger flights between Russia and Georgia starting July 8, citing "the need to ensure a sufficient level of aviation security". Indirect flights through Minsk, Istanbul, Baku, and Yerevan remain, as does the land border between the two countries.

In late August 2019, the first serious crisis occurred in South Ossetia following the 2008 war after the Georgian government built a police checkpoint close to the line of separation to prevent Russian and South Ossetian border guards from installing fencing on Georgian-controlled territory in the village of Chorchana. South Ossetian authorities demanded from Georgia to dismantle the police outpost and threatened to take it by force. The Georgian government refused. In September 2019, the Russian and Georgian foreign ministers met together in an attempt to defuse the tensions. However, they failed to reach an agreement, and the Incident Prevention and Response Mechanisms in South Ossetia (a subsidiary dialogue format of the Geneva International Discussions) has stopped working for one year. The Georgian police outpost remained in place. The de facto South Ossetian leadership further threatened to attack the Georgian police and take them over.

=== Russian invasion of Ukraine ===
In December 2021, Russia condemned NATO's acceptance of new members and forwarded its leadership security demands, specifically to never admit Georgia or Ukraine to the alliance. In early February 2022, the Georgian parliament adopted a supportive resolution for Ukraine amid the Russian military build-up at its border, expressing concerns over the possible military escalation. During the Russian invasion of Ukraine, Georgia supported Ukraine diplomatically and politically. During the first four months following the outbreak of war, Georgia has joined more than 260 resolutions and statements condemning Russia's actions. However, Georgia refused to join international sanctions against Russia. Therefore, despite otherwise hostile relations, Russia has not put Georgia on its Unfriendly Countries List.

During the war, Georgia became one of the main destinations for Russian immigrants fleeing the effects of the international sanctions placed on Russia by the Western countries. Some effects of the migration (such as the increase in real estate prices) added new strain to old tensions between Georgians and Russians. The positive socio-economic effects of Russian migration included high economic growth and strengthening of the Georgian currency.

On May 10, 2023, Vladimir Putin signed a decree abolishing the visa regime for Georgian citizens introduced in 2000 and lifting the ban on airline flights with Georgia, adopted during the heightened tensions followed by the 2019 Georgian protests.

=== 2023-2024 Georgian protests ===
Georgian lawmakers clashed in parliament in 2023 and in 2024 over a controversial bill on "foreign agents" that was labelled "the Russian law" by opponents of the government. Despite opposition, the ruling party passed legislation which requires organizations receiving foreign funds to register as foreign agents or face fines. The crisis escalated into the protests. The bill, defended by Prime Minister Irakli Kobakhidze as promoting accountability, was criticised by Western countries.

== See also ==
- Foreign relations of Georgia
- Foreign relations of Russia
- Georgia–Russia border
- Georgians in Russia
- Russians in Georgia
- List of ambassadors of Russia to Georgia
- List of ambassadors of Georgia to Russia
- Proposed Russian annexation of South Ossetia
- Georgia–European Union relations
- Georgia–NATO relations
- Georgia–Ukraine relations
- Georgia–United States relations
