= 2003 in Georgia (country) =

- Decades: 1980s; 1990s; 2000s; 2010s; 2020s
- See also: Other events of 2003; List of years in Georgia (country)

== Incumbents ==
- President of Georgia: Eduard Shevardnadze (until November 23, 2003), Nino Burjanadze (acting; since November 23, 2003)
- State Minister: Avtandil Jorbenadze (until November 23, 2003), Zurab Zhvania (since November 23, 2003)
- Chairperson of the Parliament: Nino Burjanadze (until November 23, 2003), Mikheil Machavariani (acting; since November 23, 2003)

== Events ==
- February 3 – Georgia pledges its support to the planned United States-led campaign against Iraq.
- March 21 – The Parliament of Georgia ratifies the U.S.-Georgian military agreement, allowing the U.S. military to utilize the mutually agreed facilities in Georgia.
- March 23–24 – Around 30 former servicemen of the National Guard of Georgia attempt at mutiny, ostensibly to attract attention to their difficult social conditions, but eventually surrender to the Georgian police.
- April 7 – The Union of Citizens of Georgia, the Socialist Party and the newly established political movement Great Silk Road coalesce into the pro-Shevardnadze bloc For New Georgia to run for the November parliamentary elections.
- June 5 – Three employees of the U.N. Observers Mission in Georgia (UNOMIG) and one Georgian interpreter are abducted in the Kodori Gorge, the only part of breakaway Abkhazia more or less controlled by Georgia, only to be released unharmed on June 10.
- July 1 – Georgia and the Russian energy giant Gazprom sign an agreement on strategic cooperation for 25 years.
- August 3 – Georgia sends its first military detachment to Iraq to be deployed in the city of Tikrit.
- September 10 – One hundred and twenty-nine convicts escape from the Rustavi top security prison near Tbilisi, killing one prison guard and injuring another in the largest ever jailbreak in Georgia, prompting the Justice Minister Roland Giligashvili to resign.
- September 19 – President Shevardnadze yields demand from the Georgian Orthodox Church and public pressure to refuse to sign a concordat with the Holy See.
- October 23 – The authorities of the Autonomous Republic of Adjara violently disperse an opposition rally organized by the United National Movement, the largest protest in the region since Aslan Abashidze’s ascent to local power early in the 1990s.
- November 2 – Parliamentary elections, simultaneously with the referendum on reduction of parliamentary seats from 235 to 150, are held in Georgia in a chaotic voting process.
- November 22 – Georgian opposition supporters led by Mikheil Saakashvili took control of the government and parliamentary buildings after three tense weeks of mass protests against the election fraud.
- November 23 – President Shevardnadze resigns in the wake of mass opposition protests in what is to become known as the Rose Revolution. The chairwoman of the outgoing parliament Nino Burjanadze succeeds as the President of Georgia on an interim basis.
- November 23 – Shevardnadze's supporter Aslan Abashidze declares state of emergency in his region of Adjaria.
- November 25 – The outgoing Parliament of Georgia schedule snap presidential election for January 4, 2004.

== Deaths ==
- March 4 - Jaba Ioseliani, retired politician and warlord (born 1926); stroke.

== See also ==
- List of '2003 in' articles
