= 2002 in Georgia (country) =

- Decades: 1980s; 1990s; 2000s; 2010s; 2020s
- See also: Other events of 2002; List of years in Georgia (country)

== Incumbents ==
- President of Georgia: Eduard Shevardnadze
- State Minister: Avtandil Jorbenadze
- Chairperson of the Parliament: Nino Burjanadze

== Events ==
- 15 January – Georgian police forces under the personal supervision of Interior Minister Koba Narchemashvili launch the first phase of anti-criminal operation in the Pankisi Gorge in Georgia's border with Chechnya.
- 2 March – Georgia's breakaway Abkhazia holds parliamentary election, not recognized by the international community as legal.
- 2 April – Georgia agrees to withdraw its Defense Ministry troops from Kodori Gorge, the only part of Abkhazia more or less under the control of Georgia.
- 25 April – The 4.8 mb Tbilisi earthquake shook the area with a maximum MSK intensity of VII–VIII (Very strong – Damaging), causing 5–6 deaths and 52–70 injuries. Damage was estimated at $160–350 million.
- 27 May – The United States-sponsored Train-and-Equip program launched in the Georgian armed forces.
- 2 June – Georgia holds the second local self-governance elections.
- 19 August – President of Georgia Eduard Shevardnadze announces the start of an all-out "anti-criminal and counterterrorist operation" in the Pankisi Gorge.
- 23 August – Russian fighter jets bomb the Georgian villages bordering Chechnya, killing one and injuring several civilians; the Organization for Security and Co-operation in Europe Observers Mission to Georgia officially confirms the fact, but the Russian authorities reject it.
- 14 October – President Shevardnadze and Patriarch of Georgia Ilia II sign a constitutional agreement between the state and the Georgian Orthodox Church at the Svetitskhoveli Cathedral in Mtskheta.
- 22 November – President Shevardnadze makes an official bid for NATO accession at the Euro-Atlantic Partnership Council session in Prague.
- 3 December – Georgia ratifies the construction of the Baku–Tbilisi–Ceyhan pipeline.

== Deaths ==
- 25 February – Nugzar Sajaia, Georgian National Security Council secretary (born 1942); suicide.
- 19 May – Otar Lordkipanidze, archaeologist and anthropologist (born 1930), natural causes.
- 19 December – Kote Makharadze, a popular actor and sportscaster (born 1925); cerebrovascular disease.
- 20 November – Kakhi Asatiani, businessman and former soccer star (born 1947); assassinated.
