= Erosi Kitsmarishvili =

Georgian diplomat (1964–2014)

His Excellency Erosi Kitsmarishvili ეროსი კიწმარიშვილი

Georgia Ambassador to Russia
- In office February 2008 – 11 July 2008
- President: Mikheil Saakashvili
- Preceded by: Irakli Chubinishvili
- Succeeded by: Vacant

Personal details
- Born: 5 August 1964 Rustavi, Georgian SSR, Soviet Union
- Died: 15 July 2014 (aged 49) Tbilisi, Georgia
- Profession: Politician, media executive

Erosi Kitsmarishvili (Georgian: ეროსი კიწმარიშვილი, 5 August 1964 – 15 July 2014) was a Georgian media executive and served as Ambassador of Georgia to the Russian Federation from February 2008 to July 2008. Appointed in February 2008, Kitsmarishvili was recalled on 11 July after Russia confirmed it had conducted military flights over South Ossetia, a breakaway region of Georgia that would be occupied by Russia after the August 2008 War between the two states.

Prior to accepting the ambassadorial post, Kitsmarishvili owned the Rustavi 2 television broadcasting company, which played a key role during the Rose Revolution of 2003. Since his dismissal in mid-September 2008 by Georgian president Mikheil Saakashvili, he publicly criticized Saakashvili's handling of the August 2008 war with Russia over the breakaway regions of South Ossetia and Abkhazia — claiming that although Russia had provoked the conflict, the actual fighting had been started by Georgia, and that the United States had approved the Georgian government's plans to retake Abkhazia in early 2008. Kitsmarishvili has also spoken out in favour of increased pluralism in the Georgian media. In November 2009, Kitsmarishvili took over the management rights of the Tbilisi-based pro-opposition television station Maestro TV.

Kitsmarishvili ran for the office of mayor of Rustavi in the 2014 elections, but was defeated.

In July 2014 Kitsmarishvili was found dead in a garage of the apartment block where he lived in Tbilisi's Vake district. The authorities said he had one gunshot wound to the head, and although they were investigating the death under article 115 of the criminal code, which deals with suicide, they would examine other causes of his death as well.

== See also ==
- Embassy of Georgia in Moscow
- 2008 South Ossetia war
