= State Minister (Georgia) =

State Minister (Georgian: სახელმწიფო მინისტრი, romanized: sakhelmts'ipo minist'ri) is a position in the Government of Georgia, which can be introduced by a special law in order to oversee the government's tasks of particular importance. There can be one or several state ministers in the government.

== History ==
The position of State Minister was introduced in 1995. At that time, the State Minister headed the chancellery of the President of Georgia and was responsible for individual tasks entrusted by the President.

After the introduction of the position of Prime Minister and establishment of the government as an executive agency in 2004, separate from the President, the State Minister became an optional member of the government responsible for specific tasks of particular importance. Since then, the number of State Ministers in various governments of Georgia has varied; some of the former offices include State Minister for Euro-Atlantic Integration (2004–2017) and State Minister on Diaspora Issues of Georgia (2008–2016). As of January 2019, there is only one State Minister in the government of Georgia, that of Reconciliation and Civic Equality.

=== State ministers, 1995–2004 ===
State ministers

No.	Name (Born–Died)	Picture	Took office	Left office	Party
1	Niko Lekishvili (1947–2025)		8 December 1995	26 July 1998	Union of Citizens of Georgia
2	Vazha Lortkipanidze (1949–)		31 July 1998	11 May 2000	Union of Citizens of Georgia
3	Giorgi Arsenishvili (1942–2010)		11 May 2000	21 December 2001	Union of Citizens of Georgia
4	Avtandil Jorbenadze (1951–2024)		21 December 2001	27 November 2003	Union of Citizens of Georgia
5	Zurab Zhvania (1963–2005)		27 November 2003	17 February 2004	United National Movement
