= Raul Usupov =

Georgian politician

Raul Usupov (Georgian: რაულ უსუფოვი Raul Usupovi; Azeri: Raul Yusupov) (1980 – February 3, 2005) was a politician in the nation of Georgia and deputy governor of Kvemo Kartli region.

He was born in the village of Karajala, near Telavi, Kakheti, to Azeri parents - Yashar and Lily Usupov. At the age of 20, he moved to Tbilisi, where he got married and had a daughter. He later joined Georgia's United National Movement, then led by Zurab Zhvania (who later became Georgia's Prime Minister). He became a close friend of Zhvania and it was in Usupov's flat in Tbilisi that the two men were found dead in the early hours of the morning of 3 February 2005, apparently as a result of a natural gas leak, and with "no sign of foul play", according to Georgian authorities and FBI officers.
