= Zurab Nogaideli =

Former Prime Minister of Georgia

- ზურაბ ნოღაიდელი
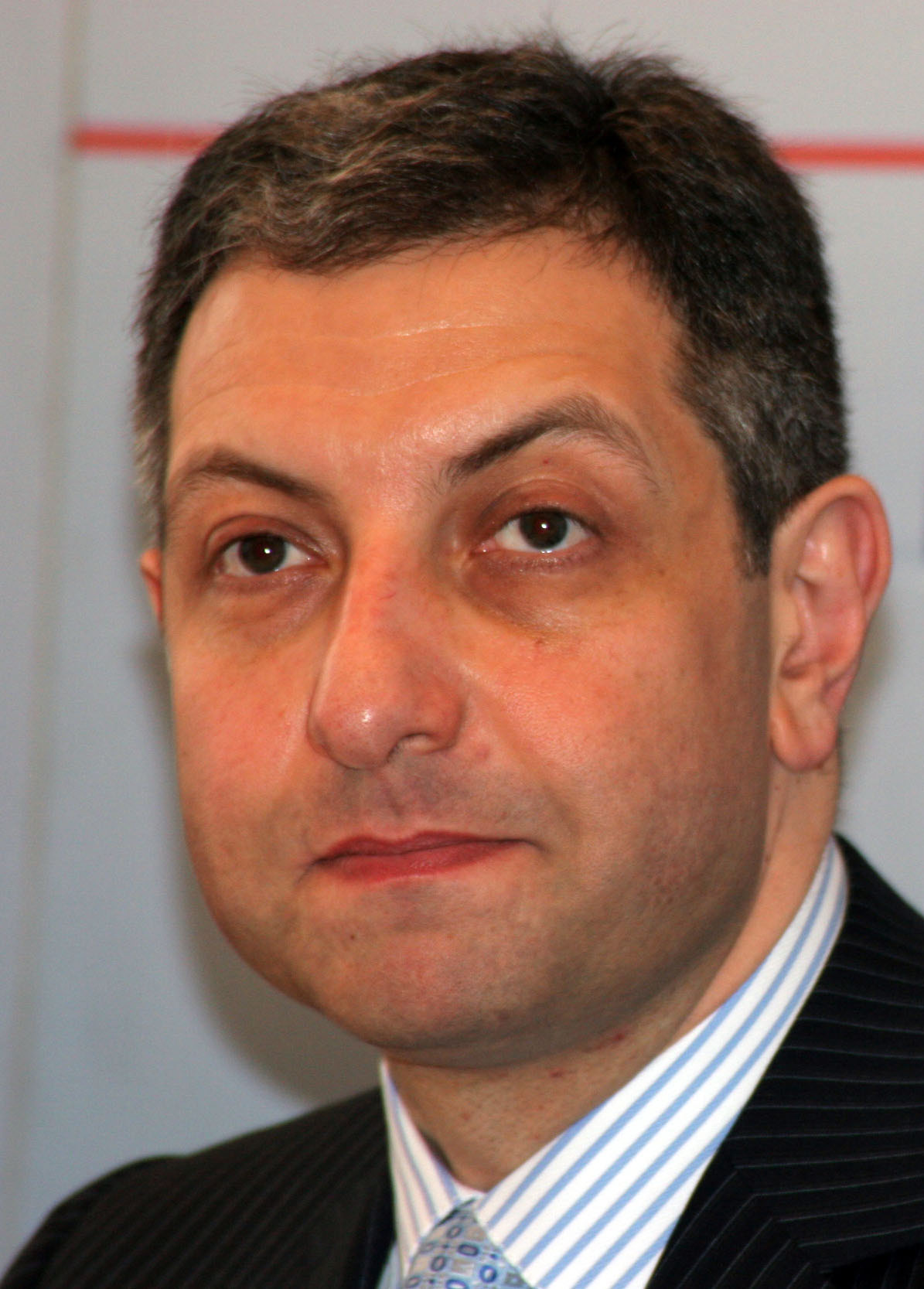
- Nogaideli in 2006

Prime Minister of Georgia
- In office 17 February 2005 – 16 November 2007
- President: Mikheil Saakashvili
- Preceded by: Mikheil Saakashvili (Acting)
- Succeeded by: Giorgi Baramidze (Acting)

Minister of Finance
- In office 27 November 2003 – February 2005
- President: Mikheil Saakashvili
- Preceded by: Mirian Gogiashvili
- Succeeded by: Valeriy Chechelashvili
- In office May 2000 – November 2001
- President: Eduard Shevardnadze
- Preceded by: David Onoproshvili
- Succeeded by: Mirian Gogiashvili

Member of the Parliament of Georgia
- In office 1992 – 30 May 2000
- President: Eduard Shevardnadze

Personal details
- Born: 22 October 1964 (age 61) Kobuleti, Adjaria, Georgian SSR, Soviet Union
- Party: Movement for a Fair Georgia (2008–?); United National Movement (2002–2008); Union of Citizens of Georgia (1995–2002); Green Party of Georgia (1992–1995)
- Education: Moscow State University
- Occupation: Politician
- Profession: Physicist

Zurab Nogaideli (Georgian: ზურაბ ნოღაიდელი; born 22 October 1964) is a Georgian businessman and a politician who served as the prime minister of Georgia from February 2005 until he resigned, citing health problems, on 16 November 2007. In December 2008, Nogaideli withdrew into opposition, setting up the Movement for a Fair Georgia party.

== Early life and career ==
Born in Kobuleti, Ajaria, Georgia, Nogaideli graduated from the Moscow State University with a diploma in Physics in 1988. Before entering into national politics, he worked for the Institute of Geography of the Georgian Academy of Sciences between 1988 and 1992. In 1989–1990, he was also trained at the Institute of Geology of the Academy of Sciences of Estonia.

== Parliament ==
He started his political career together with his friend, Zurab Zhvania, in the Green Party of Georgia in early 1990s. Nogaideli became a deputy in the Parliament of Georgia in 1992, elected following the overthrow of President Zviad Gamsakhurdia, and chaired the Parliamentary Committee on Environment Protection and Natural Resources during 1992–1995. He was again member of the successor Parliaments in 1995–1999 and 1999–2000, when he chaired the Parliamentary Tax and Income Committee.

== Minister of Finance ==
He joined the government of Eduard Shevardnadze in the capacity of Minister of Finance in May 2000. During these years, he was considered a member of a political team of young reformists headed by Zurab Zhvania and Mikheil Saakashvili and proved to be quite an effective minister.

In 2001, he left the President-run Union of Citizens of Georgia party which he had joined in 1995. He was sacked, in 2002, without explanation, though it appears that he had intended to resign in protest against the policies of Shevardnadze's increasingly corrupted government (as the Minister of Justice Mikheil Saakashvili did a year before).

In a brief period of 2002–2003, he was involved in banking and investment ventures.

After Shevardnadze was ousted in the Rose Revolution of 21–23 November 2003, Nogaideli returned to government as the economic adviser to the acting president, Nino Burjanadze. He was re-appointed to his old post as Minister of Finance in February 2004 in the government of Prime Minister Zurab Zhvania.

== Prime minister ==
President Mikhail Saakashvili nominated Nogaideli for the post of Prime Minister on 11 February 2005 following the untimely death of Zhvania. He was confirmed by the Georgian Parliament on 17 February 2005 by a vote of 175 to 24, and was sworn in immediately. Nogaideli is not a member of any party and is regarded as a technocrat with a tough approach to the corruption that plagues Georgia's economy.

According to Financial weekly Georgian newspaper The World Bank Group and the U.S. Agency for International Development has honored Zurab Nogaideli, Prime Minister of Georgia, as top business environment reformer of the year 2007. The Prime Minister has led reforms which have catapulted Georgia from a ranking of 112 to 37th place in the World Bank Group's 2007 global rankings on the regulatory ease of doing business.

Nogaideli is married with one son.

== Resignation ==
Nogaideli announced his resignation on 16 November 2007 due to his poor health condition. In April 2007, Nogaideli underwent elective open-heart surgery at St. Luke's Episcopal Hospital in Houston, U.S. The operation, led by leading US surgeon Dr. Charles Frazier, lasted for 8 hours and involved transplanting one mitral valve of the PM's heart.

After his resignation, Nogaideli said he would retire from politics and later joined the Kala Capital company – owned by the soccer star Kakha Kaladze – as its chairman.

Since June 2008, he has also been a chairman of the International School of Economics at Tbilisi State University Business Council.

== Opposition ==
After the Russian-Georgian war, in September 2008, Nogaideli appeared in the Georgian press, unleashing heavy criticism of foreign and domestic policies of Mikheil Saakashvili. On 3 December 2008, he set up a new opposition party, the Movement for Fair Georgia.

In 2009, Nogaideli traveled several times in Russia, meeting top Russian officials, including Prime Minister Vladimir Putin (23 December 2009). In December 2009, he also met Eduard Kokoity, the breakaway South Ossetian leader, ostensibly to help release of the Georgian teenagers detained by the South Ossetian military. Nogaideli's rapprochement with Moscow met with a negative response from the Georgian government. President Saakashvili described Nogaideli's Russian stance as a "sin".

Preceded by Zurab Zhvania	Prime Minister of Georgia; 2005–2007	Succeeded by Lado Gurgenidze
