= Giorgi Arsenishvili =

Georgian mathematician and politician; former State Minister of Georgia

- გიორგი არსენიშვილი

State Minister of Georgia
- In office 11 May 2000 – 21 December 2001
- President: Eduard Shevardnadze
- Preceded by: Vazha Lortkipanidze
- Succeeded by: Avtandil Jorbenadze

Personal details
- Born: 5 January 1942 Khirsa, Sighnaghi District, Georgian SSR, Soviet Union
- Died: 17 November 2010 (aged 68)
- Party: Union of Citizens of Georgia
- Education: Tbilisi State University; Heidelberg University

Giorgi "Gia" Arsenishvili (Georgian: გიორგი [გია] არსენიშვილი; 5 January 1942 – 17 November 2010) was a Georgian mathematician and politician, who, from 2000 to 2001, served as the State Minister of Georgia.

== Career ==
Born in the village of Khirsa, then-Soviet Georgia, and a mathematician by education, Arsenishvili has held a high academic position at the Tbilisi State University, his alma mater, where he chaired the Department of Cybernetics and Applied Mathematics for several years. He entered Georgia's politics as President Eduard Shevardnadze's envoy in Arsenishvili's home region of Kakheti in 1995. After the re-election of Shevardnadze on 9 April 2000, and the resignation, in accordance with the Constitution of Georgia, of the cabinet of Vazha Lortkipanidze, Arsenishvili was appointed Minister of State and Head of the State Chancellery of Georgia in May 2000. His appointment was widely regarded as a compromise between Lortkipanidze and the chairman of the Parliament of Georgia, Zurab Zhvania.

From 2001 to 2004, Arsenishvili served as ambassador of Georgia to Austria, Hungary, Slovenia, Slovakia, and the Czech Republic. Arsenishvili was a member of the supervisory board of the United Telecom of Georgia, the largest Georgian fixed-line telecom operator, from 2004 to 2006 and a member of the supervisory board of the Georgian Railways from 2006 to 2007. In 2008 he was elected to the Parliament of Georgia on a United National Movement ticket from a single-mandate constituency of Telavi. He chaired the Parliamentary Committee for Human Rights until his death due to myocardial infarction in November 2010.
