= Niko Lekishvili =

Georgian politician (1947–2025)

- ნიკო ლეკიშვილი

State Minister of Georgia
- In office 8 December 1995 – 26 July 1998
- President: Eduard Shevardnadze
- Preceded by: Position established; Otar Patsatsia as the Prime minister of Georgia
- Succeeded by: Vazha Lortkipanidze

Mayor of Tbilisi
- In office 16 October 1993 – 8 December 1995
- Preceded by: Konstantine Gabashvili
- Succeeded by: Badri Shoshitaishvili

Personal details
- Born: 20 April 1947 Tbilisi, Georgian SSR, USSR
- Died: 3 January 2025 (aged 77)

Nikoloz "Niko" Lekishvili (Georgian: ნიკოლოზ [ნიკო] ლეკიშვილი; 20 April 1947 – 3 January 2025) was a Georgian politician who was a state minister, Mayor of Tbilisi, and a member of the Parliament of Georgia.

== Early years ==
Lekishvili was born on 20 April 1947 in Tbilisi, Georgia. He graduated from Georgian Polytechnic Institute with a degree in Heat and Energy Engineering (High Temperature Physics) in 1971. He then started working for the same institute as a scientific associate and senior scientific associate of the High Temperature Physics Department from 1971 through 1972. In 1972-1973, he was the instructor of Tbilisi City Komsomol Committee. In 1973-1974, he was the secretary and then the first secretary of the Pervomaysky District Komsomol Committee in Tbilisi. From 1974 through 1977, he worked as the secretary and the first secretary of Tbilisi City Komsomol Committee. Starting from 1977 until 1990, he held supervisory positions in Georgia's Communist Party and Soviet government bodies, serving as the second and the first secretary of the Party Committee of Pervomaysky District and then as the district's Chairman of the Executive Committee from 1977 through 1989, and as second and first secretary of the Party Committee from 1989 through 1990.

In the midst of his governmental activities, he also graduated from Moscow Economy Academy in 1988.

At the end of 1990, Lekishvili founded Galo G.M. Co Ltd, merging it with Kavkasioni Co Ltd in 1991, which was then restructured and incorporated into Coca Cola Bottlers, Georgia. In 1994, Lekishvili family took control of the management of the company.

== Political career ==
In 1990, Lekishvili was elected the Chairman of the City Executive Committee of Tbilisi and in 1990-1991 served as the Deputy Chairman of Supreme Council of Georgia. From January through November 1992, he served as the State Advisor to the Cabinet of Georgia. He was then elected deputy to the Parliament of Georgia during 1992 parliamentary elections, serving as an MP until November 1995. From September until October 1993, he was the representative of the Prime Minister of Georgia. In October 1993, he was appointed Mayor of Tbilisi. On 8 December 1995 he was appointed Prime Minister of Georgia by President Eduard Shevardnadze. As a result of criticism by the government over economic policies and the issue of Abkhazia, Lekishvili resigned from his post on 26 July 1998. Lekishvili was then re-elected to the parliament and was a member of Regional Politics and Local Government Committee. He was the leader of Majority coalition in the parliament since 1999 and one of the leaders of Citizen's Union of Georgia. Until late 2004, he chaired the Economic Policy Committee of the parliament. After the Rose Revolution in 2004, Lekishvili left the parliament.

== Personal life and death ==
Lekishvili was married and had two daughters. He died on 3 January 2025, at the age of 77.
