= Zurab Zhvania =

Georgian politician; Prime Minister of Georgia (1963–2005)

- ზურაბ ჟვანია
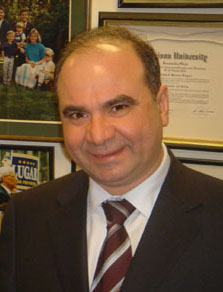

4th Prime Minister of Georgia
- In office 17 February 2004 – 3 February 2005
- President: Mikheil Saakashvili
- Preceded by: Office established; Himself as the State Minister of Georgia
- Succeeded by: Mikheil Saakashvili (Acting)

State Minister of Georgia
- In office 27 November 2003 – 17 February 2004
- President: Nino Burjanadze (Acting); Mikheil Saakashvili
- Preceded by: Avtandil Jorbenadze
- Succeeded by: Office abolished; himself as the Prime Minister of Georgia

2nd Chairman of the Parliament
- In office 25 November 1995 – 1 November 2001
- President: Eduard Shevardnadze
- Prime Minister: Niko Lekishvili; Vazha Lortkipanidze; Giorgi Arsenishvili
- Preceded by: Eduard Shevardnadze
- Succeeded by: Nino Burjanadze

Member of the Parliament of Georgia
- In office 4 November 1992 – 5 February 2004

General Secretary of the Union of Citizens of Georgia

Personal details
- Born: 9 December 1963 Tbilisi, Georgian SSR, USSR (now Georgia)
- Died: 3 February 2005 (aged 41) Tbilisi, Georgia
- Party: United National Movement (2004-2005); United Democrats (2002-2004); Union of Citizens of Georgia (1993-2002); Green Party of Georgia (1992-1993)
- Education: Tbilisi State University
- Awards: St. George's Order of Victory, Medal of 13 January

Zurab Zhvania (Georgian: ზურაბ ჟვანია; 9 December 1963 – 3 February 2005) was a Georgian politician, who served as Prime Minister of Georgia and Chairman of the Parliament of Georgia.

Zhvania began his political career at a young age, as a member of the Green Party in the early 1990s. In 1993, Zhvania was elected General Secretary of Eduard Shevardnadze's political party, the Union of Citizens of Georgia. From that point on, until his death in 2005, Zhvania played an important role in Georgian politics. In 1995 he became the Chairman of the Parliament of Georgia, and maintained the post until his resignation in 1999, which was followed by the discharge of other ministers whom Zhvania had suspected of corruption. In 2003, Zhvania united with other opposition leaders, mainly Burdjanadze, Okruashvili and Saakashvili, to hold non-violent protests against the rigging of the 2003 parliamentary elections. These protests culminated with the resignation of Shevardnadze, and the ascendance of Saakashvili to the presidency. Zhvania became Prime Minister and held the post until his death in 2005.

== Early life ==
Zhvania was born in Tbilisi into the family of Besarion Zhvania, an ethnic Georgian, and Rema Antonova, of mixed Jewish and Armenian ancestry, both physicists working at the Tbilisi Institute of Physics. In 1985 he graduated from the Faculty of Biology of the Tbilisi State University. He worked at the university through 1992. In 1993 he married Nino Kadagidze, who owned a book store with English language books in Tbilisi. They had a son and two daughters: Elisabeth, Besarion and Anna. Zhvania spoke Georgian, English, German and Russian.

== Career ==
Zhvania entered national politics in 1988. Between 1988 and 1990, Georgia's Green Party, which Zhvania co-chaired, was one of a number of opposition groups that took part in the country's drive to regain its independence. In September 1991 his party joined the opposition to the first post-Soviet President of Georgia, Zviad Gamsakhurdia. Gamsakhurdia's violent overthrow in January 1992 resulted in Eduard Shevardnadze, the former Soviet foreign minister, coming to power a few months later. In 1992 Zhvania was elected chairman of Eastern European Greens.

Shevardnadze established the Union of Citizens of Georgia to provide a moderate centre-right grouping for reformist democrats. Zhvania joined the UGC in 1995, entering the Georgian parliament in the same year, and recruited other reformists to the party, notably Mikheil Saakashvili. In 1993, Zhvania became general secretary of Shevardnadze's party. On 25 November 1995, after the party's victory at the election, he was elected as chairman of the Georgian parliament.

However, Zhvania fell out with Shevardnadze over a corruption scandal and resigned as speaker on 1 November 2001. He and Saakashvili also left Shevardnadze's party. In 2002, he established and chaired a new party, called the United Democrats.

Zhvania had a wife and three children, and in addition to his native Georgian, he spoke Armenian, Hebrew, English, German, and Russian. Zurab Zhvania is the only Georgian Prime Minister to have died while in office.

== November elections ==
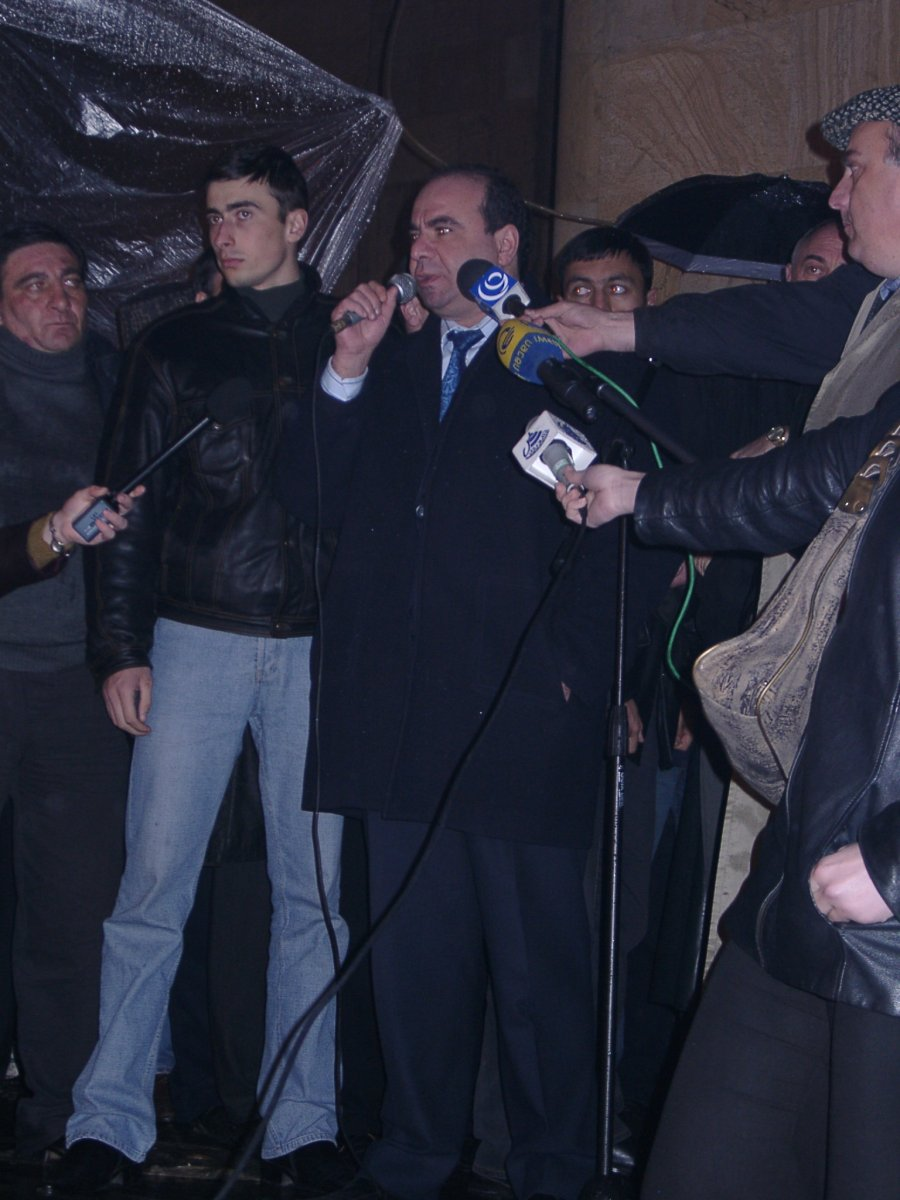
Zhvania addresses an opposition rally during the Rose Revolution, November 2003.

The parliamentary elections of 2 November 2003 were widely condemned by local and international observers as being grossly rigged by the government. In response, Zhvania and other opposition figures called for mass protests against Shevardnadze. Two weeks of massive popular protests followed, forcing Shevardnadze's resignation on 23 November. He was replaced on an interim basis by Zhvania's successor as parliamentary speaker, Nino Burjanadze. Zhvania himself became a minister in the transitional government prior to fresh presidential elections held on 4 January 2004, which were won by Saakashvili.

== Prime minister ==
In February 2004 according to the proposal of President Saakashvili Zhvania was elected as prime minister by the Parliament of Georgia. He led a young reformist cabinet with 15 members with an average age of 35 years. With his cabinet Zhvania was seen as a moderate counterweight to the "radical" attitudes of President Saakashvili. He also was a key figure in the talks on the separatist republics of Abkhazia and South Ossetia. Controversial was Zhvania's role during the privatisations in Georgia, when he took over all final decisions, while the competent ministers of economy had to be changed three times within two years. Experts also criticized his role in the sale of the port of Batumi and of 16 ships of the Georgian Black Sea fleet.

== Death ==
=== Circumstances ===
Zhvania died early in the morning of 3 February 2005 from what officials claimed was carbon monoxide poisoning caused by an inadequately ventilated gas heater. He was in a rented apartment with Raul Usupov, deputy governor of Georgia's Kvemo Kartli region, at the time. Usupov also died. Guards entered the house after there was no word from Zhvania for several hours to find him in an armchair and Usupov in the kitchen. Details of the incident are still limited, although officials have said there was a gas-powered heating stove in the main room of the house, where a table was set up with a backgammon set lying open upon it.

Immediately after the incident, live on Rustavi-2 television, Georgia's Interior Minister Vano Merabishvili said there was no reason to suspect foul play. Bodies were taken to the coroner's office, where a preliminary examination showed both died from carbon monoxide poisoning. There were reports of serious technical violations when the gas heaters were installed, with officials saying there was no ventilation in the apartment.

However, Zhvania's family members have questioned the official version of the death, with Goga Zhvania having said that he was sure that his brother was assassinated. In March 2006 interview with the Washington Post Georgia's ex-president Eduard Shevardnadze also said that he believed Zhvania was murdered.

In addition, Irakli Okruashvili has also stated in his scandalous speech in Imedi TV, that Zhvania's corpse was moved to the house, but who actually moved the corpse he said he was not going to talk about that any longer that day.

According to some reports Mikheil Machavariani, Deputy Chairman of the Parliament of Georgia, was one of the last people who spoke with Zurab Zhvania the night before his death.

President Mikheil Saakashvili, at an emergency Cabinet meeting, said, "In Zurab Zhvania, Georgia has lost a great patriot, who devoted his entire life to serving the motherland. Zurab's death is a great blow to Georgia and to me personally. I lost a very close friend, a reliable adviser and a great ally. I want to call on you all to be strong, because there is no greater responsibility than loyal service to our country and our people." Rabbi Mikhailashvili stated, "The Jewish community mourns the sudden loss of Zurab Zhvania. As a Jew, he had a close relationship to the Jewish community in Georgia." As of March 2014 Mikheil Saakashvili was wanted by the Georgian Prosecutor's office for questioning in an investigation carried out for the purpose of establishing circumstances surrounding Zhvania's death.

=== Bodyguard trials and aftermath ===
Years after the incident, Zhvania's death remains at the center of Georgia's political life. In 2015, several of Zhvania's bodyguards were convicted of neglect after they admitted that on the day of Zhvania's death they had left him alone, at his own request. According to the bodyguards, Zhvania maintained a secret apartment and went to unspecified meetings there, sometimes disguised in a beard. When the security personnel entered the apartment to check on Zhvania, they found his body naked along with the naked Raul Usupov. The bodyguards admitted to tampering with the scene in order to erase any traces that the two men have had sex, so as to "keep his [Zhvania’s] name clean". Zhvania's family members deny allegations of homosexuality and instead insist that it was a staged murder by unspecified persons.

== Notes ==
Political offices
Preceded by Avtandil Jorbenadze	State Minister of Georgia; 2003–2004	Succeeded by —
Preceded by —	Prime Minister of Georgia; 2004–2005	Succeeded by Zurab Nogaideli
