= Vazha Lortkipanidze =

Georgian politician

- ვაჟა ლორთქიფანიძე

State Minister of Georgia
- In office 31 July 1998 – 11 May 2000
- President: Eduard Shevardnadze
- Preceded by: Nikoloz Lekishvili
- Succeeded by: Giorgi Arsenishvili

Ambassador of Georgia to Russia
- In office 1995–1998

Chief of Staff of the Office of the Head of State of Georgia
- In office November 1992 – 17 January 1995

Personal details
- Born: 29 November 1949 (age 76) Tbilisi, Georgian SSR

Vazha Lortkipanidze (Georgian: ვაჟა ლორთქიფანიძე; born 29 November 1949) is a Georgian politician, former State Minister of Georgia and Ambassador of Georgia to Russia, member of the Parliament of Georgia, Professor and a true member of the National Academy of Sciences of Georgia.

== Early years ==
Lortkipanidze was born on 29 November 1949 in Tbilisi, Georgia. In 1973, he graduated from Mathematics Department of Tbilisi State University and Moscow Academy of Sciences with bachelor's and then doctoral degrees.

In 1983–1986, he was second and then first secretary of Central Committee of Georgian Komsomol during Eduard Shevardnadze's tenure as the First Secretary of Georgian SSR. In 1986–1988, he was the First Secretary of Mtatsminda Regional Committee of Communist Party of Georgia and then worked as the head of department in the CC of Communist Party of Georgia and in 1989–1990 as Deputy Chairman of Cabinet of Ministers of Georgia.

== Political career ==
When Zviad Gamsakhurdia took over with independence of Georgia, Lortkipanidze left government work, finding a job at Tbilisi Research Institute. But with Shevardnadze's return to power in January 1992, he was immediately appointed as a senior advisor. After the establishment of the Cabinet of Ministers in November 1992, he was appointed the Chief of Staff of Presidential Administration of Georgia, a post he held until 17 January 1995. From 1995 through 1998, he was the Ambassador of Georgia to Russia. His additional duties were representing the Georgian side in the Russian-mediated negotiations with Abkhazia. He had good relations with high-ranking officials in the Russian government but at home he was considered pro-Russian by the opposition parties. Lortkipanidze was appointed State Minister of Georgia on 31 July 1998, shortly after Nikoloz Lekishvili resigned from the post on 26 July due to criticism on economic policies. Lortkipanidze left the post on 11 May 2000 and was replaced by Giorgi Arsenishvili. He was elected the leader of Christian-Democratic Union of Georgia in November 2002.

Considered a close ally to Shevardnadze, he was appointed the head of the campaign for pro-presidential block Alliance for New Georgia in the Georgian presidential election campaign.

He has a PhD in Economics and is currently a professor at Tbilisi State University. He married Irine Khomeriki in 1983 and they have two children: Nino (1984) and Ana (1993).
