= Khirsa Monastery =

Georgian monastery

Khirsa monastery of Saint Stephen
- ხირსის სტეფანწმინდის მონასტერი
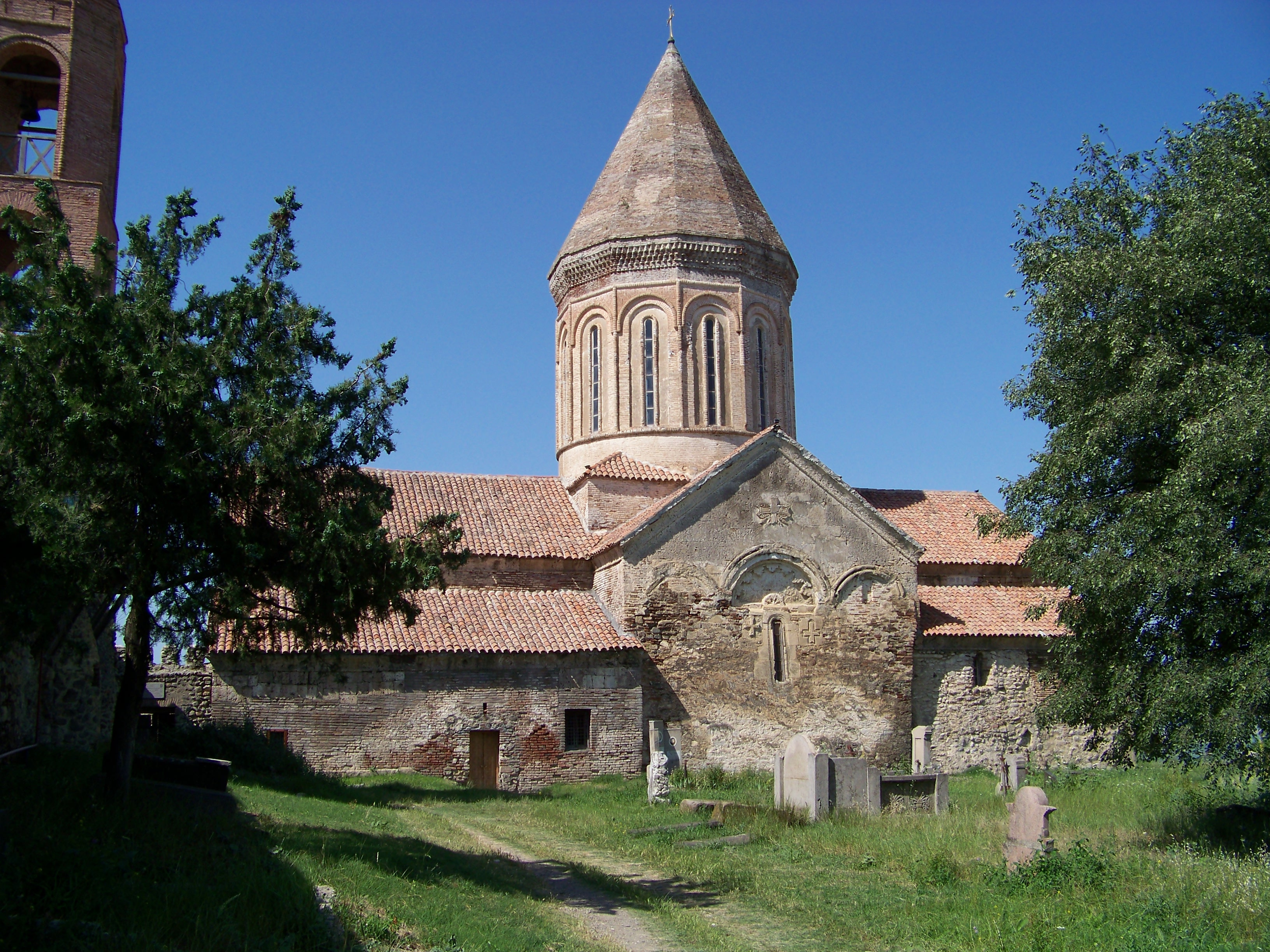
- Khirsa monastery
- Interactive map of Khirsa monastery of Saint Stephen
- Location: Tibaani, Sighnaghi Municipality; Kakheti, Georgia
- Coordinates: 41.577729°N 46.000838°E
- Type: Monastery

The Khirsa monastery of Saint Stephen (Georgian: ხირსის სტეფანწმინდის მონასტერი, romanized: khirsis st'epants'mindis monast'eri) is a Georgian Orthodox monastery in the eastern Georgian region of Kakheti. The foundation of the monastery is credited by historical tradition to the monk Stephen, one of the Thirteen Assyrian Fathers active in the 6th century. The extant edifice, a domed church, is the result of a series of reconstructions between 886 and 1822. It is inscribed on the list of the Immovable Cultural Monuments of National Significance of Georgia.

== History ==
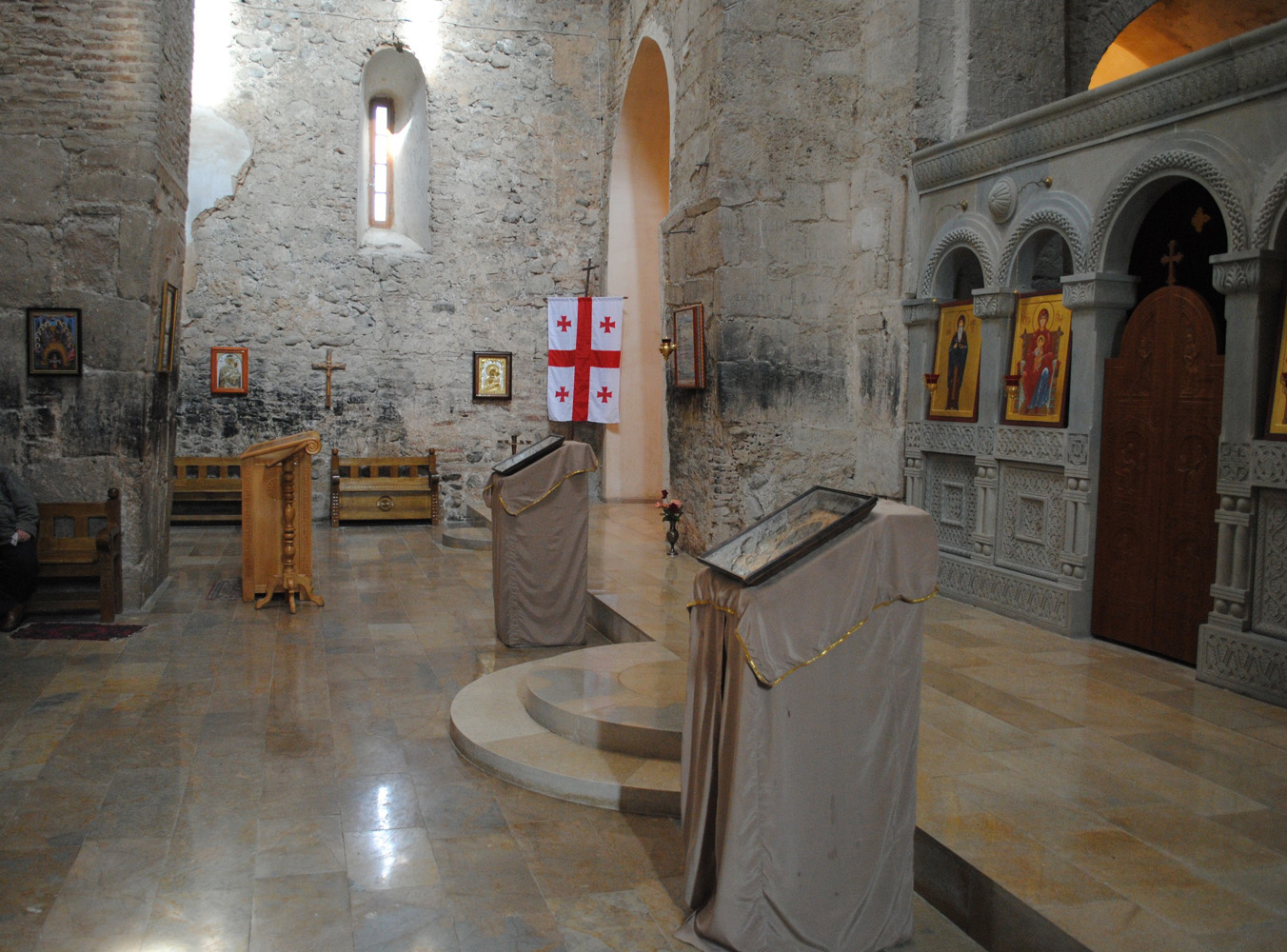
The interior with a modern iconostasis.

The Khirsa monastery, dedicated to St. Stephen the Protomartyr, stands in greenery, on the Khirsa stream at the village of Tibaani, Sighnaghi Municipality, in Georgia's easternmost region of Kakheti. The foundation of the monastery is associated in medieval Georgian tradition—elaborated in the hymns by the 13th-century cleric Arsen Bulmaisimisdze—with the 6th-century monk Stephen, one of the Assyrian missionaries. It is maintained that he is buried in the monastery. The original basilica was converted into a domed church in the 10th century and further remodeled in the 11th and 16th centuries. Finally, the church was substantially repaired in 1822. In the 1990s, after the collapse of the Soviet Union, the monastery underwent yet another renovation and was restored to the Georgian Orthodox Church.

== Layout ==
The extant church, measuring 41.3 × 23.4 metres and raising to the height of 15.4-metre, is built of cobblestone and sandstone, with occasional use of limestone. The interior is divided up by four columns and terminates in a horseshoe-shaped apse. The building is topped with a tall conical dome constructed in brickwork and pierced by twelve windows. A reused stone, placed upturned in an arch under the dome, bears a foundational inscription in the medieval Georgian asomtavruli letters, which contains the date 886 and now-illegible name of the certain eristavi ("duke"). The church has two doors, on the west and south; the latter leads into the chapel—or eukterion as it is known in the Byzantine world—of St. Nicholas, which is attached to the main church on its southwestern end. There are two more eukterions: to the right of the main sanctuary, on the south end of the church, is a vaulted chapel of the Dormition of the Mother of God, and to the left of the sanctuary, on the north, there is a chapel containing the tomb of St. Stephen of Khirsa.

=== Façades ===
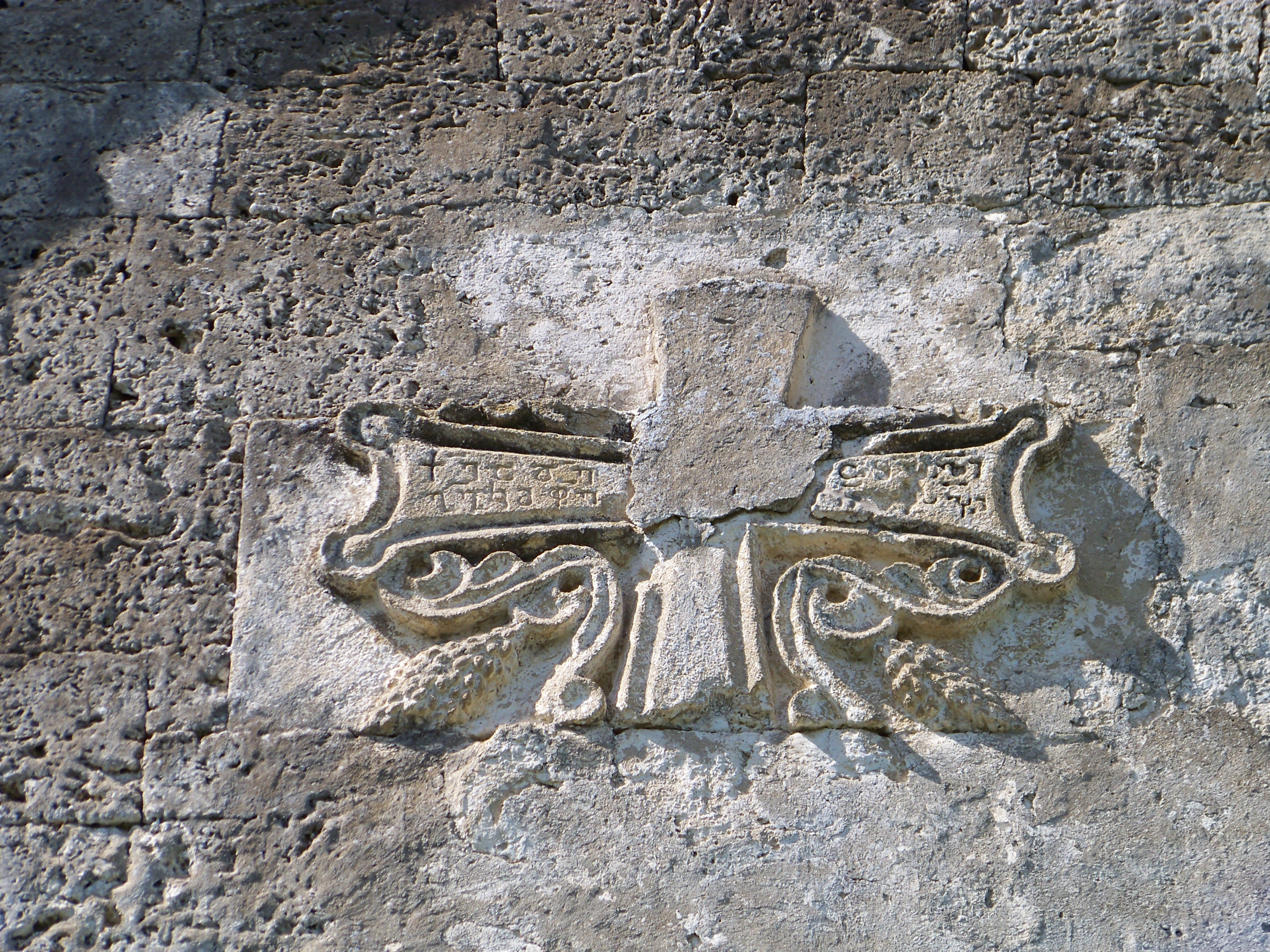
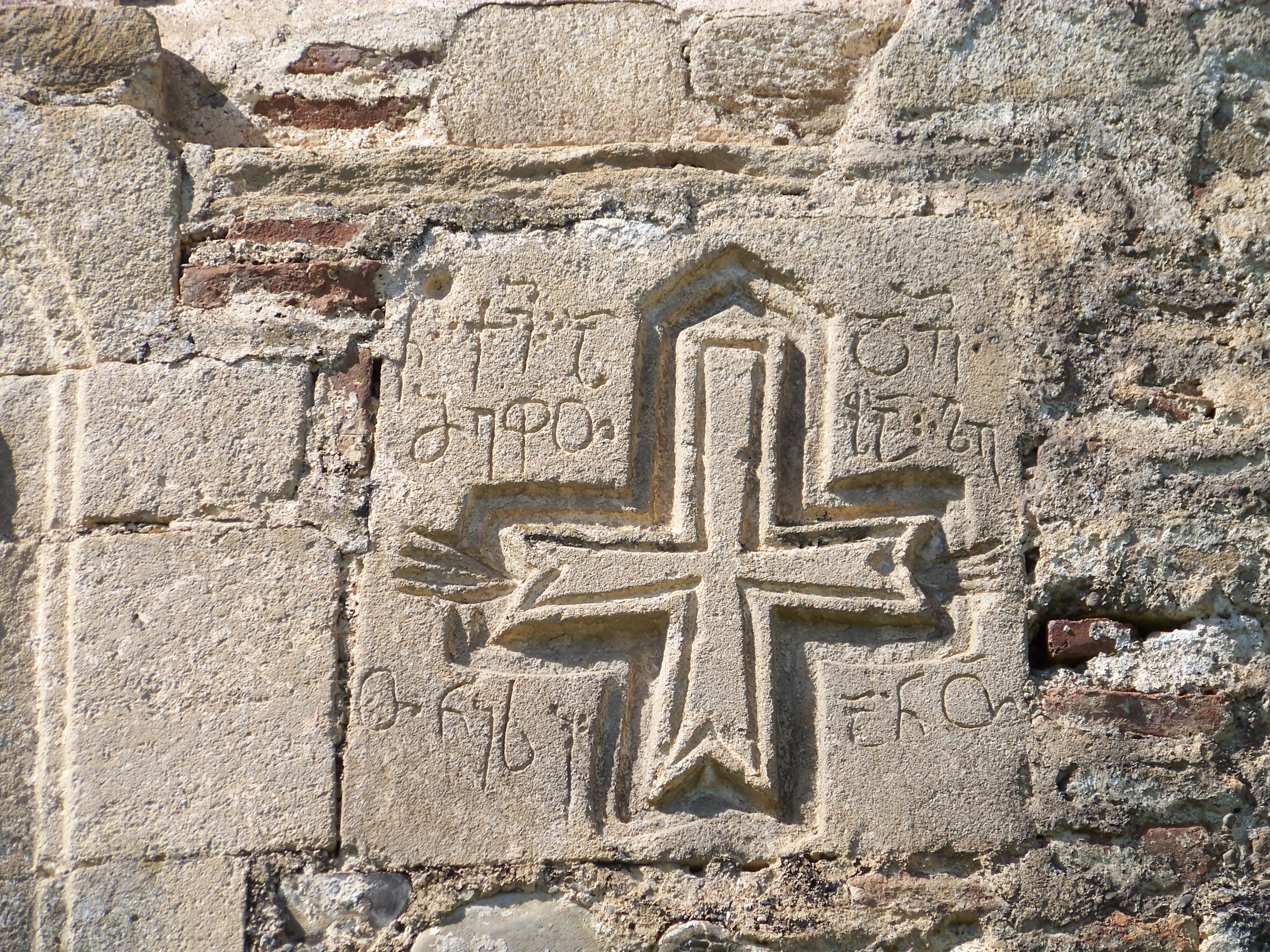
Inscriptions on the south façade.

The façades are devoid of much external ornamentation. The only adornment is an architrave above the south window, with three crosses carved in relief around it. An inscription in the left arm of the top cross, in the asomtavruli script, makes a reference to Gagik of Kakheti (r. 1039–1058), while that in the right arm mentions Giorgi, probably an archbishop. An inscription, also in asomtavruli, in a sculpted cross on the right of the south window commemorates King Leon of Kakheti (r. 1520–1574). Above the west door of the church there is another inscription, executed in a mixed asomtavruli-mkhedruli script and dated to 1822. It was placed by the archimandrite Nikepore to commemorate "the emperor Alexander I and his army", a reference of the Russian tsar Alexander I.

To the west of the church is a tall fortification wall, credited to Leon of Kakheti. There stands also a three-storey bell-tower and a two-storey house for monks.
