= Gorchakov Fund =

Russian think tank

The Alexander Gorchakov Public Diplomacy Fund
- Abbreviation: Gorchakov Fund
- Formation: 2010; 15 years ago
- Type: think tank
- Headquarters: Moscow, Russia
- Website: en.gorchakovfund.ru

The Alexander Gorchakov Public Diplomacy Fund is a Russian think tank. The policy center was founded by President Dmitry Medvedev in 2010. The organization is closely linked to Russian Ministry of Foreign Affairs.
