= Valeriy Chechelashvili =

Georgian diplomat and politician

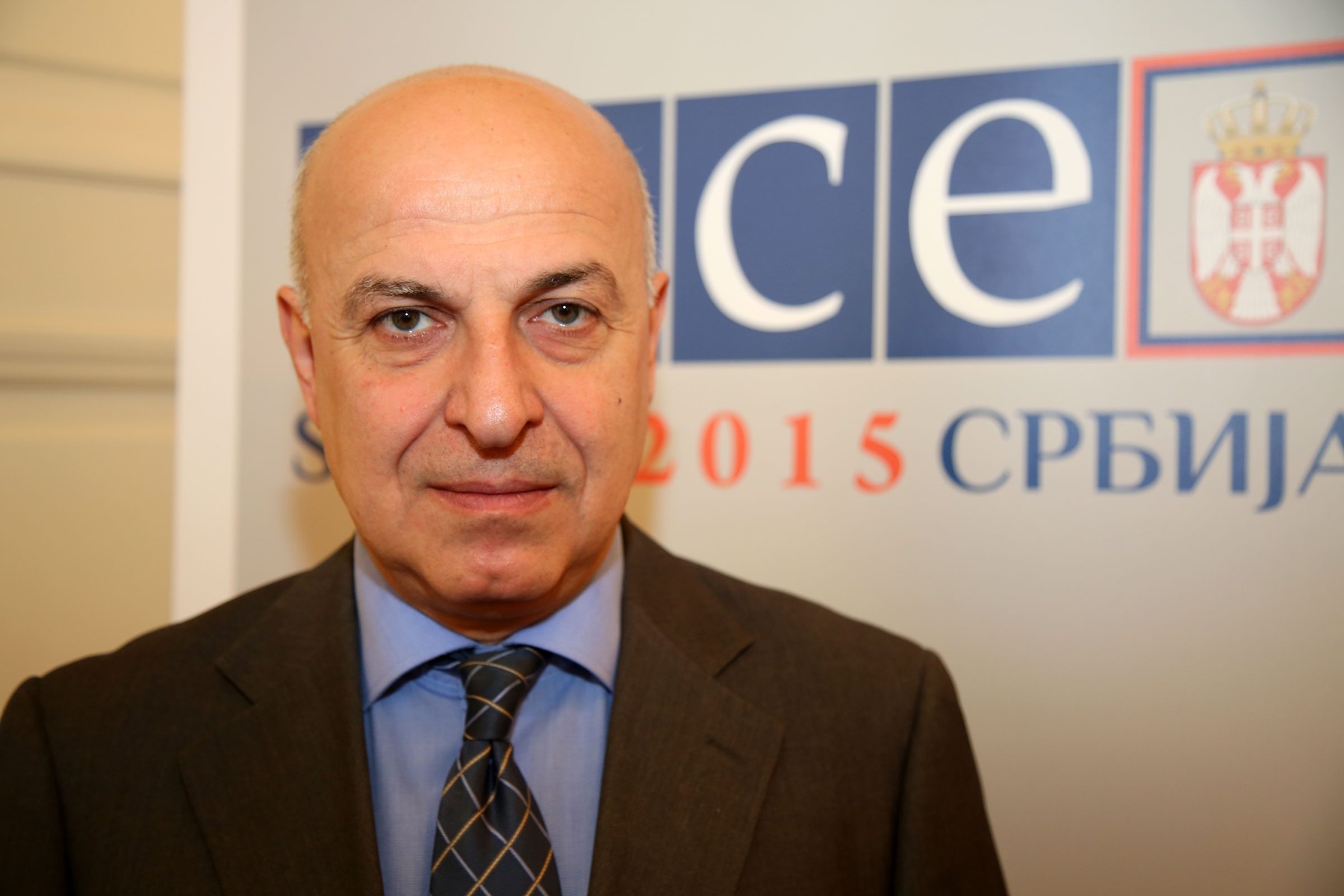
Valeri Chechelashvili

Valeri Karlovich Chechelashvili (Georgian: ვალერი ჩეჩელაშვილი; born 17 March 1961) is a Georgian diplomat and politician.

Born in Tbilisi, in 1983, Chechelashvili received his master's degree from the faculty of International relations and law of Kyiv University. In 1987, he finished aspirantura of the same faculty becoming a Candidate of Sciences in Economy.

In 1987-88, Chechelashvili worked in the republican Ministry of Light Industry of Soviet Georgia, the department of international economic relations. After that he worked for the government company "Gruzkurort" (Georgian resort). In 1989-94, Chechelashvili worked in leading positions at the Ministry of Foreign Affairs of Georgia where in 1992-94, he headed the division of international economic relations.

In 1994-96, Chechelashvili became the Ambassador of Georgia to Ukraine and Moldova concurrently. After that he returned to work at the Ministry of Foreign Affairs as a deputy minister. In 2000-05, Chechelashvili was a secretary general for the Organization of the Black Sea Economic Cooperation and then the Ambassador of Georgia to the Russian Federation.

In 2005, for several months he headed the Ministry of Finances of Georgia. Since 2005, Chechelashvili is the Ambassador of Georgia to Switzerland and Permanent representative of Georgia to the United Nations in Geneva. In 2007, he was appointed a secretary general of GUAM.
