= Avtandil Jorbenadze =

Georgian politician (1951–2024)

- ავთანდილ ჯორბენაძე
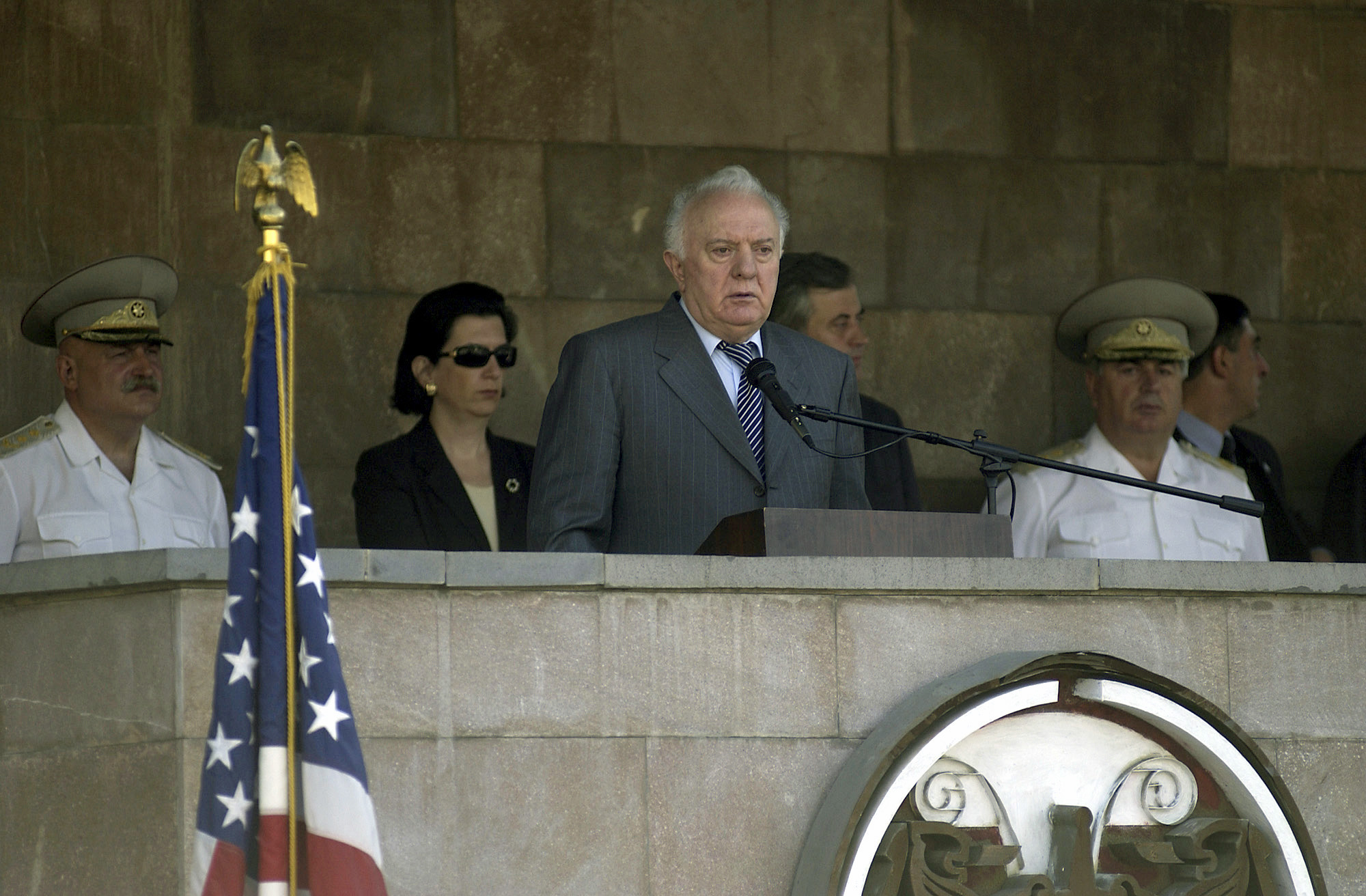

State Minister of Georgia
- In office 21 December 2001 – 25 November 2003
- President: Eduard Shevardnadze; Nino Burjanadze (acting)
- Preceded by: Giorgi Arsenishvili
- Succeeded by: Zurab Zhvania

Minister of Health and Social Affairs
- In office 19 October 1993 – 22 December 2001
- President: Eduard Shevardnadze

Deputy Minister of Health and Social Affairs
- In office 8 January 1993 – 26 March 1993
- Minister: Irakli Menagharishvili

Personal details
- Born: 23 February 1951 Chibati, Lanchkhuti District, Georgian SSR, USSR
- Died: 17 May 2024 (aged 73)
- Children: 2
- Education: Tbilisi State Medical University

Avtandil Jorbenadze (Georgian: ავთანდილ ჯორბენაძე; 23 February 1951 – 17 May 2024) was a Georgian politician who was a State Minister.

Before entering politics, Jorbenadze worked as a doctor; in this capacity, in 1992 he was called to take up the post of deputy minister of health. He left the cabinet briefly the following year, but soon rejoined it as health minister. In 1999, he was given the responsibility for social security, and the next year that for labour. When President Shevardnadze dismissed his cabinet, in the aftermath of a controversial storming of a television station by security agents, Jorbenadze was appointed head of the cabinet in December 2001. He resigned his position during the November 2003 Rose Revolution. In 2011, he became the chairman of the supervisory board for Chapidze Emergency Cardiology Center in Tbilisi.

Jorbenadze died on 17 May 2024, at the age of 73.
