= Embassy of Georgia, Moscow =

Embassy of the Republic of Georgia in Moscow (liquidated)
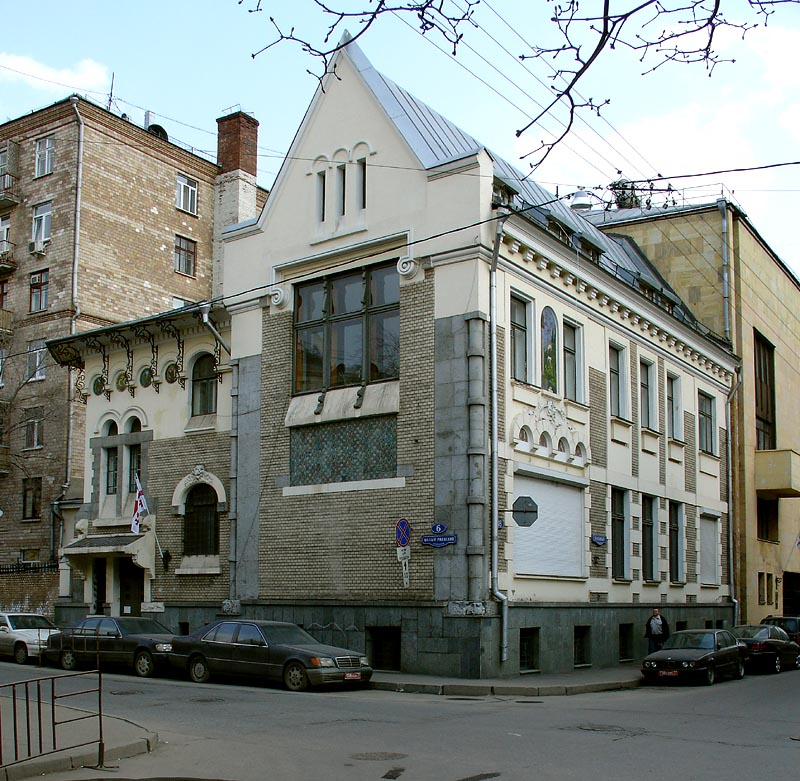
- Location: Moscow
- Address: 6 Maly Rzhevsky Lane
- Coordinates: 55.755889°N 37.5935°E

The Embassy of the Republic of Georgia in Moscow was the diplomatic mission of Georgia in the Russian Federation. It was located at 6 Maly Rzhevsky Lane (Russian: Малый Ржевский переулок, 6) in the Arbat district of Moscow. On 29 August 2008, Georgia broke diplomatic relations with Russia and withdrew all its diplomats from Russia and closed the Georgian Embassy in Moscow. They also ordered Russia to withdraw all its diplomats from Georgia and close the Russian Embassy in Tbilisi. Russia and Georgia had previously fought a five-day war over two Georgian breakaway regions declaring independence, South Ossetia and Abkhazia. Georgia is represented through the Georgian Interests Section of the Embassy of Switzerland in Russia located in the same building.

The building, completed in 1902, was designed by architect Sergey Solovyov as his private home. It was a part of an upper-class new development area on the northern side of Povarskaya Street, next to the mansions designed by Roman Klein, Alexander Kaminsky and Lev Kekushev. The architect, who worked mostly for public charities and colleges, was usually constrained by his clients, and his own home was his only venture into pure decorative art.

== See also ==
- Diplomatic missions of Georgia (country)
- Diplomatic missions in Russia
- Georgia–Russia relations
