= Bakhtadze government =

Government of Georgia

- 14th Cabinet of Georgia
- 2018-2019
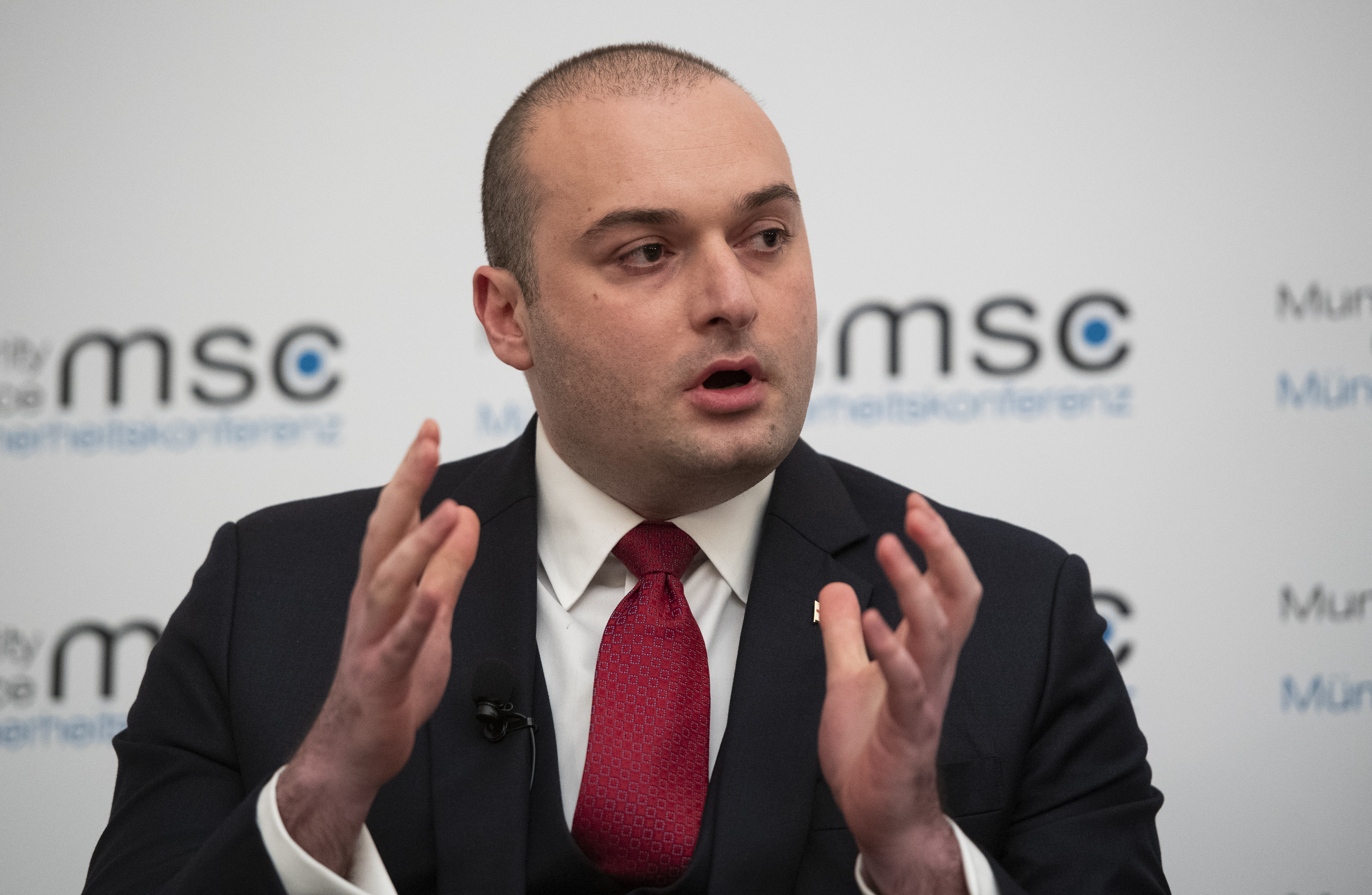
- Date formed: June 20, 2018
- Date dissolved: September 2, 2019

People and organisations
- Head of state: Giorgi Margvelashvili (Independent); Salome Zourabichvili (Independent)
- Head of government: Mamuka Bakhtadze (GD)
- No. of ministers: 11
- Member parties: Georgian Dream
- Status in legislature: Majority government

History
- Election: 2016 parliamentary election
- Legislature term: 9th Parliament of Georgia (2016–2020)
- Predecessor: Second Kvirikashvili government
- Successor: First Gakharia government

The government of Mamuka Bakhtadze was the government of Georgia, led by Prime Minister Mamuka Bakhtadze. The government was formed by the ruling Georgian Dream–Democratic Georgia coalition after the preceding one was dissolved following Prime Minister Giorgi Kvirikashvili's resignation on 13 June 2018. The incoming government won the parliamentary vote of confidence with 99 votes in favor to 6 against on 20 June 2018. The cabinet was reconfirmed, with 101 votes in favor to 12 against, by the parliament on 14 July after the previously announced structural reforms in the cabinet ministries were implemented. In a post on Facebook on 2 September 2019, Bakhtadze announced his resignation, saying that "at this stage", he has accomplished his mission.

== Ministers ==
Office	Minister	From	To	Party
Prime Minister	Mamuka Bakhtadze	20 June 2018		Georgian Dream
Deputy Prime Minister	Giorgi Gakharia	14 November 2017		Georgian Dream
Deputy Prime Minister	Maya Tskitishvili	17 July 2018		Georgian Dream
Minister of Foreign Affairs	Davit Zalkaliani	20 June 2018		Georgian Dream
Minister of Defense	Levan Izoria	1 August 2016		Georgian Dream
Minister of Internal Affairs	Giorgi Gakharia	14 November 2017		Georgian Dream
Ministry of Internally Displaced Persons from the Occupied Territories, Labor, Health and Social Protection	David Sergeenko	25 October 2012	18 June 2019	Georgian Dream
Ministry of Internally Displaced Persons from the Occupied Territories, Labor, Health and Social Protection	Ekaterine Tikaradze	18 June 2019		Georgian Dream
Minister of Justice	Thea Tsulukiani	25 October 2012		Georgian Dream
Minister of Corrections and Legal Assistance	Kakha Kakhishvili	20 June 2018	14 July 2018 (Ministry abolished)	Georgian Dream
Minister of Education and Science	Mikheil Chkhenkeli	20 June 2018	14 July 2018	Georgian Dream
Minister of Education and Science	Mikheil Batiashvili	14 July 2018		Georgian Dream
Minister of Environmental Protection and Agriculture	Levan Davitashvili	20 June 2018		Georgian Dream
Minister for IDPs, Accommodation and Refugees	Sozar Subari	20 June 2018	14 July 2018 (Ministry abolished)	Georgian Dream
Minister of Culture, Sport, and Monument Protection	Mikheil Giorgadze	20 June 2018	14 July 2018 (Ministry abolished)	Georgian Dream
State Minister for Reconciliation and Civic Equality	Ketevan Tsikhelashvili	20 June 2018		Georgian Dream
Minister of Finance	Nikoloz Gagua	20 June 2018	14 July 2018	Georgian Dream
Minister of Finance	Ivane Machavariani	14 July 2018		Georgian Dream
Minister of Economy and Sustainable Development	Giorgi Cherkezishvili	20 June 2018	14 July 2018	Georgian Dream
Minister of Economy and Sustainable Development	Giorgi Kobulia	14 July 2018	18 April 2019	Georgian Dream
Minister of Economy and Sustainable Development	Natela Turnava	18 April 2019		
Minister of Regional Development and Infrastructure	Maya Tskitishvili	20 June 2018		Georgian Dream
