= First Garibashvili government =

Government of Georgia

- 11th Cabinet of Georgia
- 2013-2015
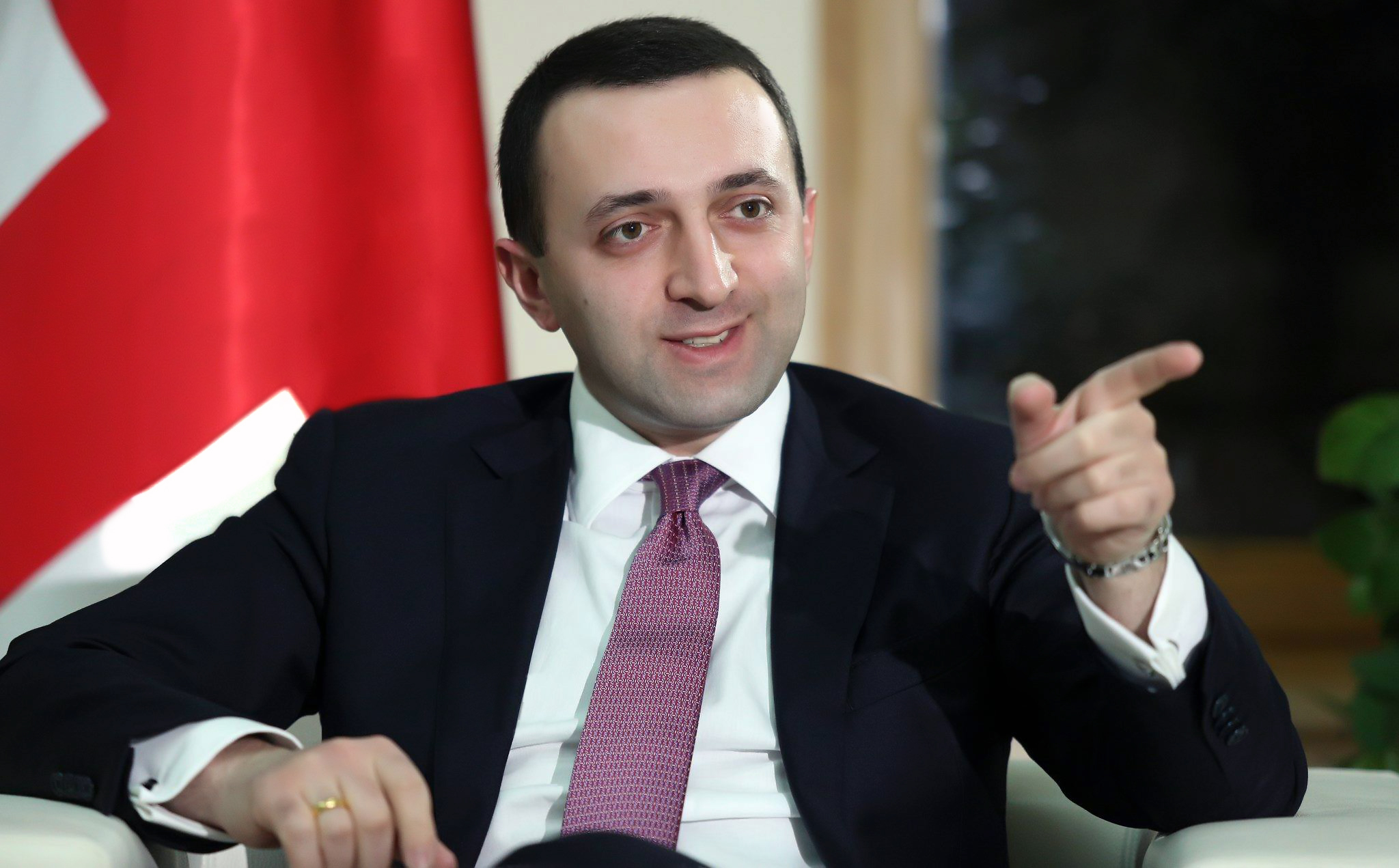
- Date formed: November 20, 2013
- Date dissolved: December 30, 2015

People and organisations
- Head of state: Giorgi Margvelashvili (GD)
- Head of government: Irakli Garibashvili (GD)
- No. of ministers: 20
- Member parties: Georgian Dream coalition
- Status in legislature: Majority government

History
- Election: 2012 parliamentary election
- Legislature term: 8th Parliament of Georgia (2012–2016)
- Predecessor: Ivanishvili government
- Successor: First Kvirikashvili government

The first government of Irakli Garibashvili was the government of Georgia, led by Prime Minister Irakli Garibashvili from November 20, 2013 until December 30, 2015. The cabinet mostly consisted of the members of the preceding Ivanishvili government, dominated by the Georgian Dream coalition, which had to win approval by the parliament after the October 2013 presidential election as envisaged by the recent constitutional amendments. Garibashvili was named by Bidzina Ivanishvili as his successor as Prime Minister on his voluntary resignation from the government. Garibashvili himself resigned in December 2015 and was succeeded by Giorgi Kvirikashvili.

== List of ministers and portfolios ==
Portfolio	Minister	Period	Party
Prime Minister	Irakli Garibashvili	November 20, 2013 –	Georgian Dream
First Deputy Prime Minister	Giorgi Kvirikashvili	November 20, 2013 –	Independent
Deputy Prime Minister	Kakha Kaladze	November 20, 2013 –	Georgian Dream
Minister of Finance	Nodar Khaduri	November 20, 2013 –	Georgian Dream
Minister of Economy and Sustainable Development	Giorgi Kvirikashvili; Dimitri Kumsishvili	November 20, 2013 – September 1, 2015; September 1, 2015 –	Independent
Minister for Labor, Healthcare and Social Affairs	David Sergeenko	November 20, 2013 –	Independent
Minister of Energy	Kakha Kaladze	November 20, 2013 –	Georgian Dream
Minister of Internal Affairs	Aleksandre Tchikaidze; Vakhtang Gomelauri; Giorgi Mgebrishvili	November 20, 2013 – January 23, 2015; January 26, 2015 – July 22, 2015; August 1, 2015 –	Independent; Georgian Dream–Democratic Georgia
Minister of Justice	Independent	November 20, 2013 –	Our Georgia – Free Democrats
Minister of Foreign Affairs	Maia Panjikidze; Tamar Beruchashvili; Giorgi Kvirikashvili	November 20, 2013 – November 5, 2014; November 11, 2014 – September 1, 2015; September 1, 2015 –	Georgian Dream–Democratic Georgia; Independent
Minister of Education and Science	Tamar Sanikidze	November 20, 2013 –	Independent
Minister for IDPs, Accommodation and Refugees	Davit Darakhvelidze; Sozar Subari	November 20, 2013 – July 21, 2014; July 26, 2014 –	National Forum; Georgian Dream–Democratic Georgia
Minister of Environment Protection and Natural Resources	Khatuna Gogaladze; Elguja Khokrishvili; Gigla Agulashvili	November 20, 2013 – July 21, 2014; July 26, 2014 – May 1, 2015; May 1, 2015 –	Independent; Georgian Dream; Republican Party of Georgia
Minister of Defense	Irakli Alasania; Mindia Janelidze; Tinatin Khidasheli	November 20, 2013 – November 4, 2014; November 5, 2014 – May 1, 2015; May 1, 2015 –	Our Georgia – Free Democrats; Georgian Dream–Democratic Georgia; Republican Party of Georgia
Minister of Regional Development and Infrastructure	David Narmania; Elguja Khokrishvili; Davit Shavliashvili; Nodar Javakhishvili	November 20, 2013 – April 14, 2014; April 14, 2014 – July 21, 2014; July 26, 2014 – 21 April, 2015; 21 April, 2015 –	Republican Party of Georgia; Independent; Independent; Georgian Dream–Democratic Georgia
Minister of Agriculture	Shalva Pipia; Otar Danelia	November 20, 2013 – July 21, 2014; July 26, 2014 –	Independent
Minister of Corrections and Legal Assistance	Sozar Subari; Giorgi Mgebrishvili; Kakhi Kakhishvili	November 20, 2013 – July 21, 2014; July 26, 2014 – August 1, 2015; August 1, 2015 –	Georgian Dream
Minister of Culture and Monument Protection	Guram Odisharia; Mikheil Giorgadze	November 20, 2013 – July 21, 2014; July 26, 2014 –	Georgian Dream–Democratic Georgia; Independent
Minister of Sport and Youth Affairs	Levan Kipiani; Tariel Khechikashvili	November 20, 2013 – May 1, 2015; May 1, 2015 –	Georgian Dream
State Minister for European and Euro-Atlantic Integration	Alexi Petriashvili; Davit Bakradze	November 20, 2013 – November 4, 2014; November 15, 2014 –	Our Georgia – Free Democrats; Georgian Dream–Democratic Georgia
State Minister for Reintegration	Paata Zakareishvili	November 20, 2013 –	Republican Party of Georgia
State Minister on the Diaspora Issues	Kote Surguladze; Gela Dumbadze	November 20, 2013 – July 21, 2014; July 26, 2014 –	Our Georgia – Free Democrats
