= Second Kvirikashvili government =

Government of Georgia

- 13th Cabinet of Georgia
- 2016-2018
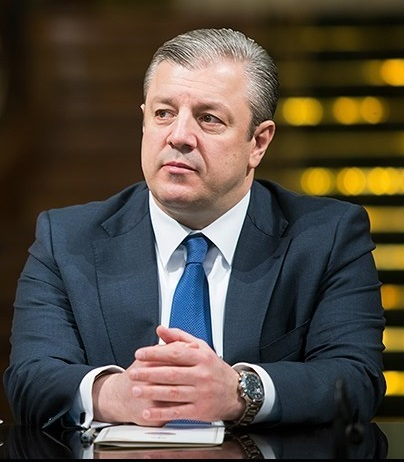
- Date formed: November 26, 2016
- Date dissolved: June 13, 2018

People and organisations
- Head of state: Giorgi Margvelashvili (GD) later (Independent)
- Head of government: Giorgi Kvirikashvili (GD)
- No. of ministers: 18
- Member parties: Georgian Dream
- Status in legislature: Majority government

History
- Election: 2016 parliamentary election
- Legislature term: 9th Parliament of Georgia (2016–2020)
- Predecessor: First Kvirikashvili government
- Successor: Bakhtadze government

The second government of Giorgi Kvirikashvili was the government of Georgia, with Giorgi Kvirikashvili as its head as the country's Prime Minister from 26 November 2016 to 13 June 2018. The cabinet was formed after the victory of the incumbent Georgian Dream–Democratic Georgia party in the October 2016 parliamentary election. On 26 November 2016, the new government, which retained most members of the preceding one, was approved by the Parliament of Georgia in the vote of confidence, with 110 votes in favor; 19 members—representing the opposition United National Movement and Alliance of Patriots of Georgia parties—voted against. The government became defunct following Kvirikashvili's resignation on 13 June 2018. It was succeeded by the government of Mamuka Bakhtadze.

== Ministers ==
Office	Minister	From	To	Party
Prime Minister	Giorgi Kvirikashvili	26 November 2016	13 June 2018	Georgian Dream
First Deputy Prime Minister	Dimitri Kumsishvili	26 November 2016	13 June 2018	Georgian Dream
Deputy Prime Minister	Kakha Kaladze	26 November 2016	12 July 2017	Georgian Dream
Deputy Prime Minister	Mikheil Janelidze	12 July 2017	13 June 2018	Georgian Dream
Deputy Prime Minister	Aleksandre Jejelava	21 February 2017	13 November 2017	Georgian Dream
Deputy Prime Minister	Giorgi Gakharia	13 November 2017	13 June 2018	Georgian Dream
Minister of Foreign Affairs	Mikheil Janelidze	26 November 2016	13 June 2018	Georgian Dream
Minister of Defense	Levan Izoria	26 November 2016	13 June 2018	Georgian Dream
Minister of Internal Affairs	Giorgi Mgebrishvili	26 November 2016	13 November 2017	Georgian Dream
Minister of Internal Affairs	Giorgi Gakharia	13 November 2017	13 June 2018	Georgian Dream
Minister for Labor, Healthcare and Social Affairs	David Sergeenko	26 November 2016	13 June 2018	Georgian Dream
Minister of Justice	Thea Tsulukiani	26 November 2016	13 June 2018	Georgian Dream
Minister of Education and Science	Aleksandre Jejelava	26 November 2016	13 November 2017	Georgian Dream
Minister of Education and Science	Mikheil Chkhenkeli	13 November 2017	13 June 2018	
Minister of Agriculture	Levan Davitashvili	26 November 2016		Georgian Dream
Minister of Energy	Kakha Kaladze	26 November 2016	12 July 2017	Georgian Dream
Minister of Energy	Elia Eloshvili	12 July 2017	22 December 2017 (Ministry abolished)	Georgian Dream
Minister for IDPs, Accommodation and Refugees	Sozar Subari	26 November 2016	13 June 2018	Georgian Dream
Minister of Environment Protection and Natural Resources	Gigla Agulashvili	26 November 2016	22 December 2017 (Ministry merged with that of Agriculture)	Georgian Dream
Minister of Culture and Monument Protection	Mikheil Giorgadze	26 November 2016	13 June 2018	Georgian Dream
Minister of Sport and Youth Affairs	Tariel Khechikashvili	26 November 2016	22 December 2017 (Ministry merged with that of Culture)	Georgian Dream
State Minister for Reconciliation and Civic Equality	Ketevan Tsikhelashvili	26 November 2016	13 June 2018	Georgian Dream
Minister of Finance	Dimitri Kumsishvili	26 November 2016	13 November 2017	Georgian Dream
Minister of Finance	Mamuka Bakhtadze	13 November 2017	13 June 2018	
Minister of Energy	Kakha Kaladze	26 November 2016	13 June 2018	Georgian Dream
Minister of Economy and Sustainable Development	Giorgi Gakharia	26 November 2016	13 November 2017	Georgian Dream
Minister of Economy and Sustainable Development	Dimitri Kumsishvili	13 November 2017	13 June 2018	
Minister of Regional Development and Infrastructure	Zurab Alavidze	26 November 2016	13 June 2018	Georgian Dream
State Minister for European and Euro-Atlantic Integration	Viktor Dolidze	26 November 2016	22 December 2017 (Ministry abolished)	
