= First Kvirikashvili government =

Government of Georgia

Kvirikashvili government
- 12th Cabinet of Georgia
- 2015-2016
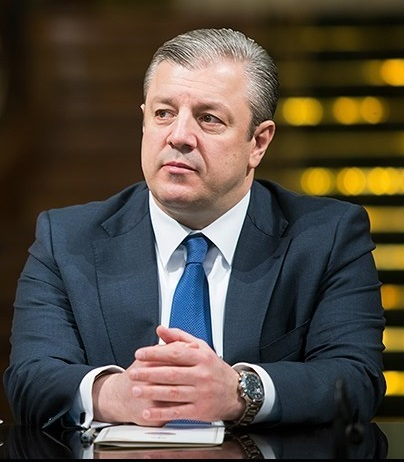
- Date formed: December 30, 2015
- Date dissolved: November 5, 2016

People and organisations
- Head of state: Giorgi Margvelashvili (GD)
- Head of government: Giorgi Kvirikashvili (GD)
- No. of ministers: 20
- Member parties: Georgian Dream coalition
- Status in legislature: Majority government

History
- Election: 2012 parliamentary election
- Legislature term: 8th Parliament of Georgia (2012–2016)
- Predecessor: First Garibashvili government
- Successor: Second Kvirikashvili government

The first government of Giorgi Kvirikashvili was the government of Georgia, led by Giorgi Kvirikashvili as the Prime Minister. It was nominated by the ruling Georgian Dream coalition after the preceding Garibashvili government was dissolved following Garibashvili's resignation and won the confidence vote in the Parliament of Georgia overnight from December 29 to December 30, 2015. On 26 November 2016, after the October 2016 parliamentary election, the second Kvirikashvili government was approved by the Parliament.

== List of ministers and portfolios ==
Portfolio	Minister	Period	Party
Prime Minister	Giorgi Kvirikashvili	December 30, 2015 –	Georgian Dream
First Deputy Prime Minister	Dimitri Kumsishvili	December 30, 2015 –	Georgian Dream
Deputy Prime Minister	Kakha Kaladze	December 30, 2015 –	Georgian Dream
Minister of Finance	Nodar Khaduri	December 30, 2015 –	Georgian Dream
Minister of Economy and Sustainable Development	Dimitri Kumsishvili	December 30, 2015	Georgian Dream
Minister for Labor, Healthcare and Social Affairs	David Sergeenko	December 30, 2015 –	Independent
Minister of Energy	Kakha Kaladze	December 30, 2015 –	Georgian Dream
Minister of Internal Affairs	Giorgi Mgebrishvili	December 30, 2015 –	Georgian Dream
Minister of Justice	Tea Tsulukiani	December 30, 2015 –	Georgian Dream
Minister of Foreign Affairs	Mikheil Janelidze	December 30, 2015 –	Independent
Minister of Education and Science	Tamar Sanikidze; Aleksandre Jejelava	December 30, 2015 – 3 June; June 3, 2016-	Independent
Minister for IDPs, Accommodation and Refugees	Sozar Subari	December 30, 2015	Georgian Dream
Minister of Environment Protection and Natural Resources	Gigla Agulashvili	December 30, 2015 –	Republican Party of Georgia
Minister of Defense	Tinatin Khidasheli	December 30, 2015 – August 1, 2016	Republican Party of Georgia
Minister of Defense	Levan Izoria	August 1, 2016 – September 8, 2019	Georgian Dream
Minister of Regional Development and Infrastructure	Nodar Javakhishvili	December 30, 2015 –	Georgian Dream
Minister of Agriculture	Otar Danelia; Levan Davitashvili	December 30, 2015 – September 9, 2016; September 9, 2016 – February 9, 2022	
Minister of Corrections and Legal Assistance	Kakha Kakhishvili	December 30, 2015 –	Georgian Dream
Minister of Culture and Monument Protection	Mikheil Giorgadze	December 30, 2015 –	
Minister of Sport and Youth Affairs	Tariel Khechikashvili	December 30, 2015 –	Georgian Dream
State Minister for European and Euro-Atlantic Integration	Davit Bakradze	November 15, 2014 –	Georgian Dream
State Minister for Reintegration	Paata Zakareishvili	December 30, 2015 – August 1, 2016; August 1, 2016 –	Republican Party of Georgia
State Minister on the Diaspora Issues	Gela Dumbadze	December 30, 2015 –	Independent
