= First Gakharia government =

Government of Georgia

- 15th Cabinet of Georgia
- 2019-2020
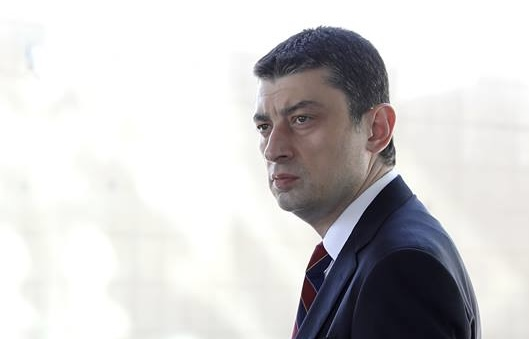
- Date formed: September 8, 2019
- Date dissolved: December 11, 2020

People and organisations
- Head of state: Salome Zourabichvili (Independent)
- Head of government: Giorgi Gakharia (GD)
- No. of ministers: 12
- Member parties: Georgian Dream
- Status in legislature: Majority government

History
- Election: 2016 parliamentary election
- Legislature term: 9th Parliament of Georgia (2016-2020)
- Predecessor: Bakhtadze government
- Successor: Second Gakharia government

The first government of Giorgi Gakharia was the government of Georgia, led by Giorgi Gakharia as Prime Minister from 8 September 2019 to December 11 2020. The cabinet was formed following the dissolution of the Bakhtadze Government. The ruling Georgian Dream party nominated Interior Minister Giorgi Gakharia to form a new administration. His cabinet won the confidence of the Parliament by 98 votes in favor, with no votes cast against it. The first Gakharia Ministry was dissolved following the 2020 parliamentary election.

== Ministers ==
Office	Minister	From	To	Party
Prime Minister	Giorgi Gakharia	20 June 2018		Georgian Dream
Deputy Prime Minister	Maya Tskitishvili	17 July 2018		Georgian Dream
Deputy Prime Minister	Thea Tsulukiani	13 September 2019		Georgian Dream
Minister of Foreign Affairs	Davit Zalkaliani	20 June 2018		Georgian Dream
Minister of Defense	Irakli Garibashvili	9 September 2019		Georgian Dream
Minister of Internal Affairs	Vakhtang Gomelauri	9 September 2019		Georgian Dream
Ministry of Internally Displaced Persons from the Occupied Territories, Labor, Health and Social Protection	Ekaterine Tikaradze	18 June 2019		Georgian Dream
Minister of Justice	Thea Tsulukiani	25 October 2012		Georgian Dream
Minister of Education and Science	Mikheil Chkhenkeli	20 June 2018		Georgian Dream
Minister of Environmental Protection and Agriculture	Levan Davitashvili	20 June 2018		Georgian Dream
State Minister for Reconciliation and Civic Equality	Ketevan Tsikhelashvili	20 June 2018		Georgian Dream
Minister of Finance	Ivane Machavariani	14 July 2018		Georgian Dream
Minister of Economy and Sustainable Development	Natela Turnava	18 April 2019		Georgian Dream
Minister of Regional Development and Infrastructure	Maya Tskitishvili	20 June 2018		Georgian Dream
