= Second Garibashvili government =

Georgian government from 2021 to 2024

- 17th Cabinet of Georgia
- 2021–2024
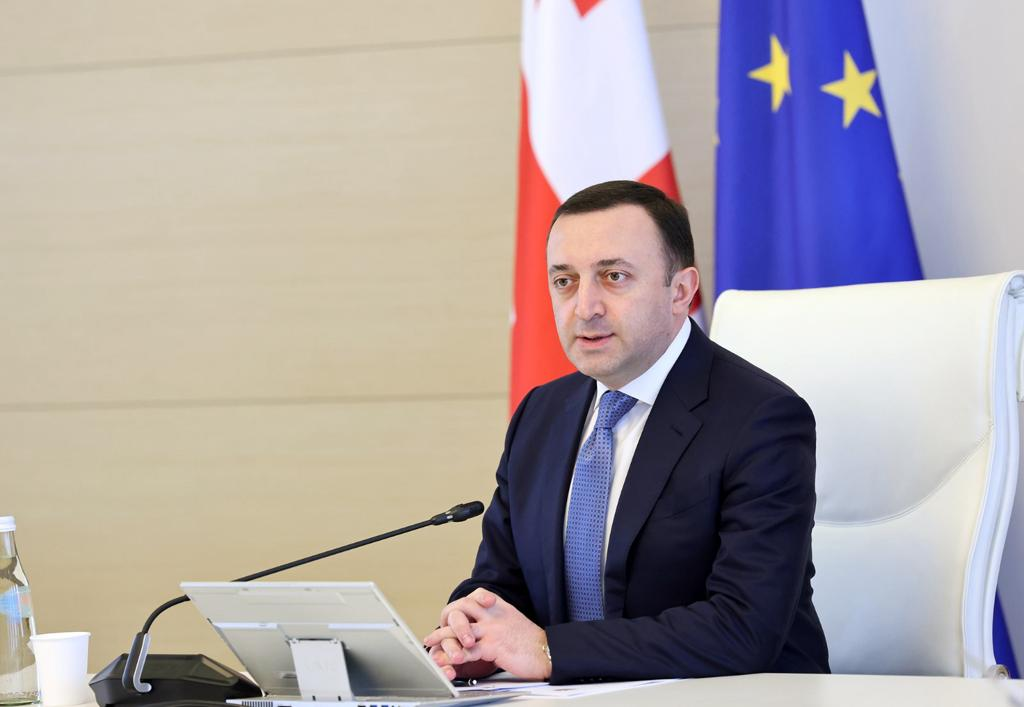
- Date formed: February 22, 2021
- Date dissolved: January 29, 2024

People and organisations
- President: Salome Zourabichvili (Independent)
- Prime Minister: Irakli Garibashvili (GD)
- Deputy Prime Minister: Thea Tsulukiani; Levan Davitashvili
- No. of ministers: 12
- Member parties: Georgian Dream
- Status in legislature: Majority government Minority government (from October 2022)

History
- Election: 2020 parliamentary election
- Legislature term: 10th Parliament of Georgia (2020–2024)
- Predecessor: Second Gakharia government
- Successor: Kobakhidze government

The second government of Irakli Garibashvili was the government of Georgia, led by Irakli Garibashvili as the Prime Minister from February 22, 2021 until January 29, 2024. Following the resignation of Giorgi Gakharia, the ruling Georgian Dream party nominated former Prime Minister and then-Minister of Defence Irakli Garibashvili to form a government. His cabinet was quickly confirmed by the Parliament four days later. The government was dissolved after Prime Minister Garibashvili's resignation on January 29, 2024. Garibashvili cited the rotation process as the main reason for his resignation, implying that other people in the ruling party should also be given a chance to lead. Garibashvili took up the offer to become the Chairman of the Georgian Dream party.

== History ==
Garibashvili took office amid political crisis in Georgia. Nika Melia, chairman of the opposition United National Movement party, was accused of organizing mass violence during the anti-government protests in 2019. In June 2019, a court released him on bail. When Melia declined to pay bail, the Tbilisi City Court satisfied the prosecution's motion to send Melia to pretrial detention. In response, Prime Minister Giorgi Gakharia proposed to postpone Melia's arrest to not exacerbate political tensions between the government and the opposition. On 18 February 2022, Gakharia resigned, citing disagreement with his party colleagues over enforcing an arrest order for Melia. The ruling Georgian Dream party supported Garibashvili to replace Gakharia, and the Parliament voted 89–2 to appoint Garibashvili on 22 February.

In his pre-confirmation address to parliament, Garibashvili promised a hardline approach to the "radical opposition" to curb their activities against "the constitutional order and framework". He referred to UNM as "a refuge of criminals and terrorists". Garibashvili presented his economic vision, criticizing the idea of a minimal state and the "invisible hand of the market". He said that "small state idea is a myth impeding the country's development" and called on the government to play an active role in the economy. Garibashvili stated that "history does not know the precedent of development by allowing processes to flow on their own" and "neither Europe nor America developed in this way". He emphasized that Georgia should become economically more self-sufficient. Garibashvili further criticized the United National Movement, which ruled Georgia for a decade before Georgian Dream took over in 2012, for their free-market approach to economics. Garibashvili's address to parliament was boycotted by the opposition (except European Socialists and Citizens), which was demanding early parliamentary elections. On 23 February, Melia was arrested while at United National Movement party headquarters.

On October 1, 2022, former Georgian President and the UNM's leader Mikhail Saakashvili returned to Georgia after an eight-year exile. Saakashvili entered the country secretly in the container of a sea cargo ship. He went live on Facebook, saying that he was in Batumi. Saakashvili was in hiding since the Georgian Prosecutor's Office filed criminal charges against him in 2014. In 2018, the Tbilisi City Court convicted Saakashvili in absentia on three charges and sentenced him to 6 years in prison. Initially Saakashvili's location was unknown to government officials, with some of them even saying that Saakashvili's arrival was fake and he was actually in Ukraine. However, later prime minister Irakli Garibashvili held press briefing, where he announced that the government successfully captured Saakashvili. He was transferred to No. 12 penitentiary facility in Rustavi and was attending his trials from there.

During the 2022 Russian invasion of Ukraine, Georgia expressed diplomatic and political support for Ukraine. Georgia has provided humanitarian assistance to Ukraine and sheltered Ukrainian refugees. However, Georgia has refused to join the Western economic sanctions against Russia. Prime Minister Irakli Garibashvili has stated that joining sanctions will harm Georgian economy and people and that he has to put Georgia's national interests above everything else. This led to worsening of relations with Ukraine since Ukrainian officials were dissatisfied with Georgia's position. Ukraine further accused Georgia of helping Russia to bypass sanctions, which Georgia denied and asked Ukraine either testify or apologize. Ukrainian President Volodymyr Zelenskyy in response dismissed Ukraine's Ambassador to Georgia.

On 3 March 2022, Georgia applied to the European Union membership ahead of schedule, following the Russian invasion of Ukraine. However, the application was rejected by the European Commission. In June 2022, the European Commission established Georgia's eligibility to become a member of the EU, but deferred giving it official candidate status until after certain conditions were met. Later that month, the European Council expressed readiness to grant Georgia the status of a candidate after completing a set of reforms recommended by the Commission.

Under Garibashvili government, political crisis in Georgia came to an end, restrictions imposed in response to COVID-19 pandemic were lifted and Georgia's post-pandemic economic recovery accelerated. To coordinate the country's economic policy, Irakli Garibashvili established the Economic Council.

== Ministers ==
Office	Minister	From	To	Party
Prime Minister	Irakli Garibashvili	22 February 2021		Georgian Dream
Deputy Prime Minister	Ivane Matchavariani	26 February 2021	31 March 2021	Georgian Dream
Deputy Prime Minister	Davit Zalkaliani	26 February 2021	4 April 2022	Georgian Dream
Deputy Prime Minister	Thea Tsulukiani	12 July 2021		Georgian Dream
Deputy Prime Minister	Levan Davitashvili	12 July 2021		
Minister of Foreign Affairs	Davit Zalkaliani	22 February 2021	4 April 2022	Georgian Dream
Minister of Foreign Affairs	Ilia Darchiashvili	4 April 2022		
Minister of Defense	Juansher Burchuladze	22 February 2021		Georgian Dream
Minister of Internal Affairs	Vakhtang Gomelauri	22 February 2021		Georgian Dream
Ministry of Internally Displaced Persons from the Occupied Territories, Labor, Health and Social Protection	Eka Tikaradze	18 June 2019	9 December, 2021	Georgian Dream
Ministry of Internally Displaced Persons from the Occupied Territories, Labor, Health and Social Protection	Zurab Azarashvili	9 December, 2021		Georgian Dream
Minister of Justice	Rati Bregadze	22 February 2021		Georgian Dream
Minister of Education and Science	Mikheil Chkhenkeli	20 June 2018		Georgian Dream
Minister of Environmental Protection and Agriculture	Levan Davitashvili	20 June 2018	9 February 2022	Georgian Dream
Minister of Environmental Protection and Agriculture	Otar Shamugia	9 February 2022		
State Minister for Reconciliation and Civic Equality	Tea Akhvlediani	6 August 2020		Georgian Dream
Minister of Finance	Ivane Matchavariani	26 February 2021	31 March 2021	Georgian Dream
Minister of Finance	Lasha Khutsishvili	31 March 2021		Georgian Dream
Minister of Economy and Sustainable Development	Natela Turnava	18 April 2019	9 February 2022	Georgian Dream
Minister of Economy and Sustainable Development	Levan Davitashvili	9 February 2022		
Minister of Regional Development and Infrastructure	Irakli Karseladze	22 February 2021		Georgian Dream
