= Second Gakharia government =

Government of Georgia

- 16th Cabinet of Georgia
- 2020-2021
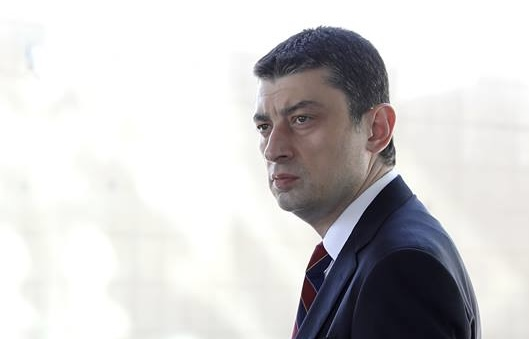
- Date formed: December 24, 2020
- Date dissolved: February 22, 2021

People and organisations
- Head of state: Salome Zourabichvili (Independent)
- Head of government: Giorgi Gakharia (GD); Maya Tskitishvili (acting) (GD)
- Deputy head of government: Maya Tskitishvili (GD)
- No. of ministers: 12
- Member parties: Georgian Dream
- Status in legislature: Majority government

History
- Election: 2020 parliamentary election
- Legislature term: 10th Parliament of Georgia (2020-2024)
- Predecessor: First Gakharia government
- Successor: Second Garibashvili government

The second government of Giorgi Gakharia was the government of Georgia, with Giorgi Gakharia as its head as the country's Prime Minister from 24 December 2020 to February 18, 2021. The cabinet was formed after the 2020 parliamentary elections, in which the victorious Georgian Dream party nominated Giorgi Gakharia as its candidate for prime minister for a second term. Gakharia presented his cabinet to parliament on December 14. The Georgian Dream backed his cabinet and approved it by a parliamentary majority on December 24. The second Gakharia administration was dissolved after his resignation on February 18, 2021, over a dispute within his party on the arrest of opposition leader Nika Melia. The political leadership of Georgian Dream, including the party's founder Bidzina Ivanishvili, later branded Gakharia "a coward and a traitor" for stepping down. Gakharia went on to form a new opposition political party.

== Ministers ==
| Office | Minister | From | To | Party |
|---|---|---|---|---|
| Prime Minister | Giorgi Gakharia | 20 June 2018 | | Georgian Dream |
| First Deputy Prime Minister | Maya Tskitishvili | 9 September 2019 | | Georgian Dream |
| Deputy Prime Minister | David Zalkaliani | 21 January 2021 | | Georgian Dream |
| Minister of Foreign Affairs | Davit Zalkaliani | 20 June 2018 | | Georgian Dream |
| Minister of Defense | Irakli Garibashvili | 9 September 2019 | | Georgian Dream |
| Minister of Internal Affairs | Vakhtang Gomelauri | 9 September 2019 | | Georgian Dream |
| Ministry of Internally Displaced Persons from the Occupied Territories, Labor, Health and Social Protection | Ekaterine Tikaradze | 18 June 2019 | | Georgian Dream |
| Minister of Justice | Gocha Lortkipanidze | 24 December 2020 | | Georgian Dream |
| Minister of Education and Science | Mikheil Chkhenkeli | 20 June 2018 | | Georgian Dream |
| Minister of Environmental Protection and Agriculture | Levan Davitashvili | 20 June 2018 | | Georgian Dream |
| State Minister for Reconciliation and Civic Equality | Ketevan Tsikhelashvili | 20 June 2018 | | Georgian Dream |
| Minister of Finance | Ivane Machavariani | 14 July 2018 | | Georgian Dream |
| Minister of Economy and Sustainable Development | Natela Turnava | 18 April 2019 | | Georgian Dream |
| Minister of Regional Development and Infrastructure | Maya Tskitishvili | 20 June 2018 | | Georgian Dream |
