= Cabinet of Giorgi Kvirikashvili =

The Cabinet of Giorgi Kvirikashvili may refer to one of the two successive cabinets of Georgia led by Giorgi Kvirikashvili:

- First Cabinet of Giorgi Kvirikashvili, 2015–2016
- Second Cabinet of Giorgi Kvirikashvili, 2016–2018
