= Davit Sergeenko =

Georgian physician

Davit Sergeenko დავით სერგეენკო

Adviser to the Prime minister of Georgia
- Incumbent
- Assumed office 8 September 2019
- Prime Minister: Giorgi Gakharia
- In office 18 June 2019 – 3 September 2019
- Prime Minister: Mamuka Bakhtadze

Minister of Internally Displaced Persons from the Occupied Territories, Health, Labour and Social Affairs
- In office 14 July 2018 – 18 June 2019
- President: Giorgi Margvelashvili; Salome Zourabichvili
- Prime Minister: Mamuka Bakhtadze
- Preceded by: Position established
- Succeeded by: Ekaterine Tikaradze

Minister of Health, Labour, and Social Affairs
- In office 25 October 2012 – 14 July 2018
- Prime Minister: Bidzina Ivanishvili; Irakli Garibashvili; Giorgi Kvirikashvili; Mamuka Bakhtadze
- Preceded by: Zurab Tchiaberashvili
- Succeeded by: Position abolished

Member of the Parliament of Georgia
- In office 11 December 2020 – 16 November 2023

Personal details
- Born: 25 September 1963 (age 63) Tbilisi, Georgian SSR, Soviet Union (Now Georgia)
- Party: Georgian Dream
- Spouse: Leila Migriauli
- Children: Two daughters
- Education: Tbilisi State Medical Institute; Moscow Institute for Continued Medical Education

Military service
- Allegiance: Georgia
- Branch/service: Medical Service, Georgian Air Force
- Years of service: 1992–1993

Davit Sergeenko (Georgian: დავით სერგეენკო; born 25 September 1963) is a Georgian physician and healthcare administrator, serving as Georgia's Minister of Health, Labor, and Social Affairs since 25 October 2012. On 13 June 2018 he was named Minister of Internally Displaced Persons from the Occupied Territories, Accommodation and Refugees in the cabinet of Mamuka Bakhtadze.

== Early life and medical career ==
Sergeenko was born in Tbilisi, the capital of then-Soviet Georgia in 1963. He graduated from the Tbilisi State Medical Institute as a pediatrician in 1987 and the Moscow Institute for Continued Medical Education as an intensive care specialist in 1991. Returning to Georgia, he practiced neonatology in Sukhumi and Rustavi from 1987 to 1992. He then served in the Georgian Armed Forces as a physician for an air force regiment from 1992 to 1993 and as a chief of medical service at the State Department of Sports from 1995 to 1997. He worked as an ICU physician at the Jo Ann Medical Center in Tbilisi from 1997 to 2006 and a medical services manager at the MediClub-Georgia clinic from 2002 to 2006. In 2006, he became Director General of a medical center in the provincial town of Sachkhere, funded by the billionaire tycoon Bidzina Ivanishvili, a Sachkhere native who had amassed his wealth in Russia in the 1990s.

== Government career ==
After Ivanishvili's Georgian Dream coalition won the October 2012 parliamentary election and subsequently formed the new government, Sergeenko was made Minister of Health, Labor, and Social Affairs in the cabinets of Ivanishvili and of his protégé and successor, Irakli Garibashvili.

Sergeenko presided over the establishment of the government-funded Universal Health Care system in February 2013. As the Georgian government's support to post-revolutionary Ukraine amid a brewing confrontation with Russia was reserved, Sergeenko was the only Georgian minister to have visited Kyiv in August 2014; he then oversaw Georgia's humanitarian aid, worth of about GEL 1 million (US$570,000), to Ukraine in September 2014. Sergeenko was also behind the controversial law adopted in August 2014, tightening the regulation of prescription drugs. He also suggested, in May 2013, that Georgia might consider decriminalization of marijuana as part of the strategy to tackle on illicit drug-trafficking channels.
