= Cabinet of Zurab Zhvania =

Government of Georgia

On February 17, 2004, the Georgian Parliament approved with 165 votes to 5 Zurab Zhvania as Prime Minister and the new cabinet, which consists of 15 Ministers and four State Ministers. Most of the ministers in the new government are in their thirties and are western-educated. Four cabinet members are women. One part of the ministers are the holdovers of the provisional authorities, which took over the power after the bloodless Rose revolution in November 2003. President Mikheil Saakashvili said also that the new cabinet would be “young, professional and the most progressive in the Eastern Europe.”

Portfolio	Minister
Prime Minister of Georgia	Zurab Zhvania
State Minister in charge of Georgia’s integration into the European structures	Tamar Beruchashvili
State Minister in charge of the national accord policy	Guram Absandze
State Minister in charge of conflict solutions	Goga Khaindrava
State Minister in charge of development of the small and medium business	Jambul Bakuradze
Minister of Foreign Affairs	Tedo Japaridze
Minister of Finance	Zurab Noghaideli
Minister of Internal Affairs	Giorgi Baramidze
Minister of Internally Displaced Persons from the Occupied Territories, Accommodation and Refugees	David Darakhvelidze
Minister of State Security	Zurab Adeishvili
Minister of Defense	Gela Bezhuashvili
Minister of Education and Science	Kakha Lomaia
Minister of Economy and Sustainable Development	Irakli Rekhviashvili
Minister of Agriculture	Davit Shervashidze
Minister of Infrastructure	Tamar Sulukhia
Minister of Refugees and Accommodation	Eter Astemirova
Minister of Justice	Giorgi Papuashvili
Minister of Environment Protection and Natural Resources	Tamar Lebanidze
Minister of Energy	Nikoloz Gilauri
Minister of Health Care	Gigi Tsereteli
Minister of Culture and Sport	Goka Gabashvili

== See also ==
- Cabinet of Bidzina Ivanishvili
- Cabinet of Georgia
- President of Georgia
- Parliament of Georgia
