= Eter Astemirova =

Georgian engineer and politician

- ეთერ ასტემიროვა

Minister of Refugees and Accommodation
- In office 23 December 2003 – 4 November 2005
- President: Mikheil Saakashvili
- Prime Minister: Zurab Zhvania
- Preceded by: Valery Vashakidze
- Succeeded by: Giorgi Kheviashvili

Personal details
- Born: 1943 (age 82–83) Autonomous Republic of Abkhazia, Georgia SSR, Soviet Union
- Education: Russian State Hydrometeorological University

Eter Astemirova (Georgian: ეთერ ასტემიროვა; born 1943), is a Georgian engineer and politician, who served as the Minister of Refugees and Accommodation in the cabinet of Zurab Zhvania from 2003 until 2005.

== Biography ==
Born in a northern town, Astemirova studied at the Hydrometeorological Institute of Leningrad, specializing in terrestrial hydrology, while her family moved to Grozny and she started working in the Checheno-Ingush Autonomous SSR Melioration Ministry. She graduated in 1976.

From 1977 to 1978 she worked as an engineer at the Calgary Construction Research Institute.

During the war and until 1995 she was the Chairman of the Committee on Human Rights and Inter-Ethnic Relations of the Government of the Autonomous Republic of Abkhazia. Also was the head of the Georgian group of trilateral commission and prepared some documents used in the Genocide Commission. Between 1995 and 2003, she was president of the Human Rights, Inter-Ethnic Relations and Ethics Commission of the Supreme Council of Abkhazia.

She was appointed Minister on 23 December 2003 by President Mikheil Saakashvili.

From 2006 to 2010, she was an extraordinary and plenipotentiary ambassador of Georgia in the Republic of Azerbaijan.
