= State Chancellery of Georgia =

Georgian Government headquarters

Administration of the Government of Georgia
- საქართველოს მთავრობის ადმინისტრაცია

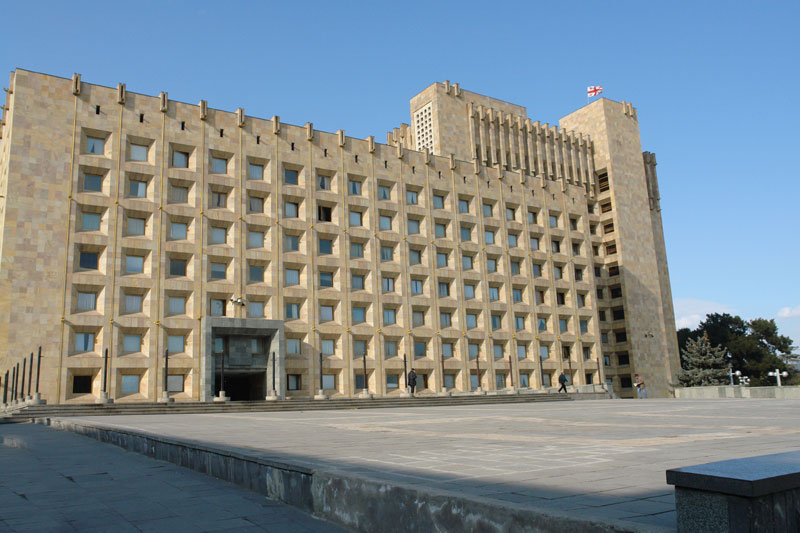
- State Chancellery building

Agency overview
- Formed: 2004; 22 years ago
- Jurisdiction: Government of Georgia
- Headquarters: 7, Pavle Ingorokva Str. Tbilisi, Georgia
- Minister responsible: Irakli Kobakhidze, Prime Minister of Georgia
- Agency executive: Ilia Shamugia, Head of the Administration (Chief of Staff)
- Website: https://www.gov.ge/en/home

The State Chancellery of Georgia (Georgian: სახელმწიფო კანცელარია, sakhelmts'ipo k'antselaria) is the headquarters of the Georgian Government that houses the Administration of the Government of Georgia (Georgian: საქართელოს მთავრობის ადმინისტრაცია, sakartvelos mtavrobis administ'ratsia) and serves as the executive office and official workplace of the Prime Minister of Georgia. The Administration of the Government provides organisational support for the activities of the government, facilitates the preparation of analytical, informational, and other materials, and controls the implementation of the decisions of the government. In addition to serving as the PM's office, the Chancellery is also the meeting place of the Cabinet of Ministers.

== History ==
The State Chancellery building was built in 1981. It initially served as the headquarters of the Central Committee of the Georgian Communist Party, however after Georgia declared its independence from the Soviet Union, it was authorised as the official residence of the President of Georgia. After the Rose Revolution of 2003 and the restoration of the office of Prime Minister, the building was granted a new status as the headquarters of the Government Administration.
