= Givi Javakhishvili =

Givi Javakhishvili (Georgian: გივი ჯავახიშვილი; Russian: Гиви Дмитриевич Джавахишвили; 18 December 1912 – 10 November 1985) was a Soviet and Georgian politician who served as Prime Minister of Georgia from 1953 to 1975.

== Early life and education ==
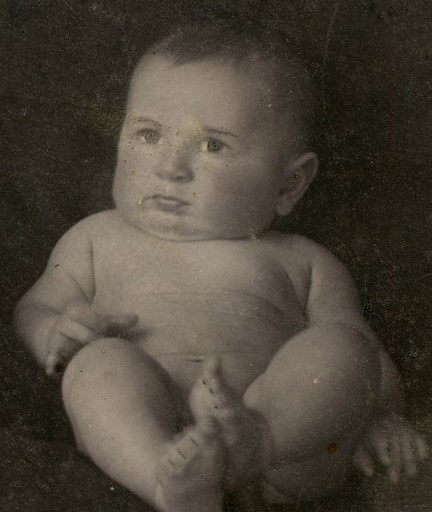
Givi Javakhishvili as a baby, 1912.

Givi Javakhishvili was born on December 18, 1912, in Tbilisi in the family of prominent doctor Dimitri Javakhishvili and Anna Magalashvili. In 1934 he graduated Transcaucasian Industrial Institute (now Georgian Technical University) with qualification of Engineer-Geologist.

== Political career ==
From 1934 to 1952 worked on different positions in local Government and Communist Party structures. From 1952 he served as deputy mayor of the Georgian Capital Tbilisi and same year was promoted to Mayor of Tbilisi, from 1953 he was deputy chairman of the Council of Ministers of Georgian SSR, 1953-1975- Chairman of the Council of Ministers of Georgian SSR (Prime Minister), Member of the Parliament of the Soviet Union and Georgian SSR, elected several times, member of the Bureau of Central Committee. From 1953 to 1975 he was a chairman of the Commission of the Protection of Georgian Language.

== Political life and contributions ==
In 1958 he was a head of Georgian delegation to World Fair EXPO in Brussels, Belgium and in 1967 in Montreal, Quebec, Canada. In 1961 Givi Javakhishvili was heading the delegation of Georgian SSR in Moscow at Congress of the CPSU where he gave the famous speech demanding the removal of Joseph Stalin's body from Lenin's Mausoleum.

By his direct initiative many high-profile buildings were built in Georgian capital Tbilisi, such as State Philharmonic Hall and the Palace of Sport. He inaugurated an opening of Tbilisi Metro in 1966 which had become the fourth underground rail system in the Soviet Union. During his 22 years (the longest period in the Georgian history) chairing Georgian Government Givi Javakhishvili was a member of several official delegations of the USSR and Georgian SSR to European Countries, United States, Canada and Turkey. He also hosted high-profile foreign guests in Tbilisi, such as Indian Prime Minister Jawaharlal Nehru, Queen of Denmark Margrethe II, French President Georges Pompidou, Shah of Iran Mohammad Reza Pahlavi, Cuban leader Fidel Castro and many other prominent figures of the 20th century.

He died on November 10, 1985, in Tbilisi.

== Awards ==
- 2 Orders of Lenin
- Order of the October Revolution
- Order of the Badge of Honour
- Order of the Red Banner of Labour
