= Maya Tskitishvili =

Former Deputy Prime Minister of Georgia

- მაია ცქიტიშვილი
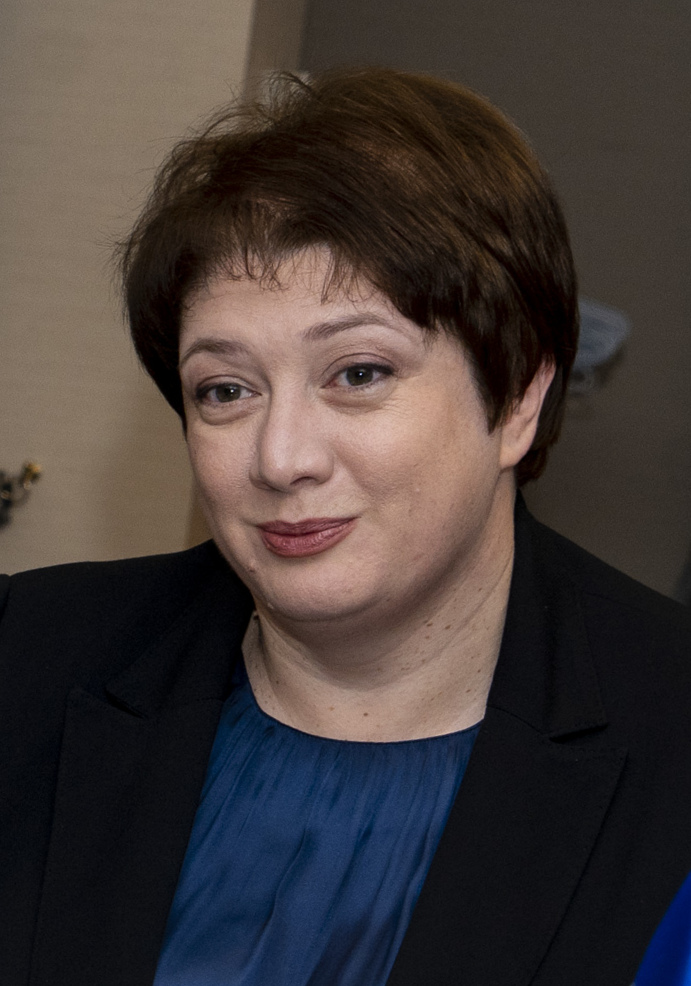
- Tskitishvili in 2019

Prime Minister of Georgia
- Acting
- In office 18 February 2021 – 22 February 2021
- President: Salome Zourabichvili
- Preceded by: Giorgi Gakharia
- Succeeded by: Irakli Gharibashvili

First Deputy Prime Minister of Georgia
- In office 21 January 2021 – 18 February 2021
- President: Salome Zourabichvili
- Prime Minister: Giorgi Gakharia
- Preceded by: Dimitri Kumsishvili (2018)
- Succeeded by: Levan Davitashvili (2024)

Deputy Prime Minister of Georgia
- In office 17 July 2018 – 21 January 2021
- President: Giorgi Margvelashvili; Salome Zourabichvili]
- Prime Minister: Mamuka Bakhtadze; Giorgi Gakharia
- Preceded by: Mikheil Janelidze
- Succeeded by: Davit Zalkaliani

Minister of Regional Development and Infrastructure
- In office 30 March 2018 – 18 February 2021
- Prime Minister: Mamuka Bakhtadze; Giorgi Gakharia
- Preceded by: Zurab Alavidze
- Succeeded by: Irakli Karseladze

Personal details
- Born: 2 June 1974 (age 52) Tbilisi, Georgian SSR, USSR
- Education: Tbilisi State University; University of Economics, Prague

Maya Tskitishvili (Georgian: მაია ცქიტიშვილი; born 2 June 1974), is a Georgian economist and politician, Deputy Prime Minister and Minister of Regional Development and Infrastructure from 2018 to 2021, in the cabinet Mamuka Bakhtadze and Giorgi Gakharia. She briefly served as acting prime minister of Georgia following the resignation of Gakharia.

Born in Tbilisi, then in Soviet Georgia, she got a degree in international economics for the Tbilisi State University and studied International Trade in the University of Economics of Prague and in the Caucasian School of Business. Tskitishvili worked as a manager and director in several companies of the private sector, like Georgian Airways and also was the Head of the Chancellery of the Government until her appointment as a minister.

== See also ==
- Cabinet of Georgia

Political offices
| Preceded by Giorgi Gakharia | Prime Minister of Georgia; Acting; 2021 | Succeeded by Irakli Garibashvili |
