= Sozar Subari =

Georgian politician, journalist, and human rights activist

- სოზარ სუბარი
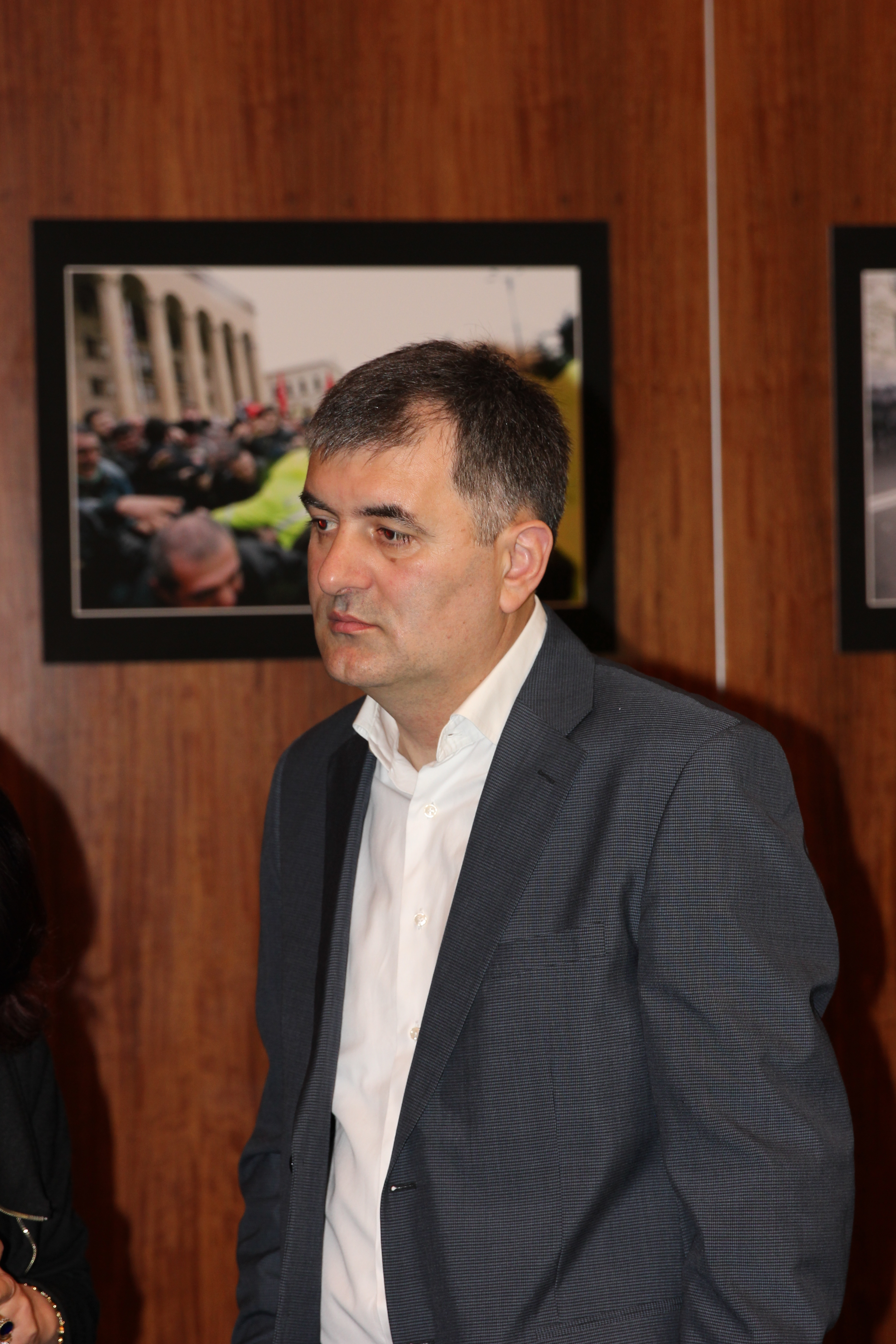
- Subari in 2014

Chairman of People's Power
- Incumbent
- Assumed office 18 March 2024
- Preceded by: party established

Adviser to the Prime Minister of Georgia on topics of regional development
- In office 16 July 2018 – 2 August 2020
- Prime Minister: Mamuka Bakhtadze; Giorgi Gakharia

Minister of Internally Displaced Persons from the Occupied Territories, Accommodation and Refugees
- In office 26 July 2014 – 14 July 2018
- Prime Minister: Irakli Garibashvili; Giorgi Kvirikashvili
- Preceded by: David Darakhvelidze
- Succeeded by: Position abolished

Minister of Corrections
- In office 25 October 2012 – 22 July 2014
- Prime Minister: Bidzina Ivanishvili; Irakli Garibashvili
- Preceded by: Giorgi Tugushi
- Succeeded by: Giorgi Mgebrishvili

Public Defender of Georgia
- In office 16 September 2004 – 16 September 2009
- Preceded by: Nana Devdariani; Temur Lomsadze (acting)
- Succeeded by: Giorgi Tughushi

Member of the Parliament of Georgia
- Incumbent
- Assumed office 1 October 2012

Personal details
- Born: November 4, 1964 (age 61) Chuberi, Georgian SSR, Soviet Union (now Tbilisi, Georgia)
- Party: People's Power (2022-present); Georgian Dream (2012-2022); Georgia Party (2010-2012); Free Democrats (2009-2010)
- Profession: historian, theologian, journalist

Sozar Subari (Georgian: სოზარ სუბარი, Russian: Созар Субари) (born November 4, 1964) is a Georgian politician, journalist, and former human rights activist. He was formerly Georgia's Minister for IDPs, Accommodation and Refugees from 26 July 2014 to 13 June 2018. He served as a Public Defender (Ombudsman) of Georgia from 2004 to 2009 and Minister of Corrections and Legal Assistance from 2012 to 2014.

== Early life and education ==
Subari was born as Sozar Subeliani (სოზარ სუბელიანი) in the highland village Chuberi (Svaneti). He studied history at the Tbilisi State University and theology at the Tbilisi Theological Academy. After a service as a deacon from 1989 to 1991, he took part in the armed conflict in Abkhazia in 1993.

== Career ==
He was involved with the influential NGO Liberty Institute from 2000 to 2004. He also worked as a journalist, including being a correspondent for Radio Liberty, and an editor of the Tbilisi-based Kavkasioni newspaper.

Subari was elected as Public Defender of Georgia by the Parliament of Georgia for five years term in 2004. During his tenure, the ombudsman's role in Georgian society increased. Subari emerged as a prominent critic of the Mikheil Saakashvili government. During the anti-government rally of 2007, he claimed to have been repeatedly beaten by the police, and stated, "Georgia is now the same as Lukashenko’s Belarus." Later he claimed that the police breakdown was masterminded at a secret meeting of top military and police officials and that Georgia's Interior Minister Vano Merabishvili had ordered police to beat protesters, "mainly in the kidneys and the stomach". On their part, the government officials have accused Subari of "politicizing" the Public Defender’s Office and turning into an opposition politician.

Subari's term expired on 16 September 2009. He was succeeded by Giorgi Tughushi, a ruling United National Movement party nominee, who was approved by the parliament in July 2009. Subari himself joined the opposition Alliance for Georgia led by Georgia's former UN envoy, Irakli Alasania. He later became one of the leaders of the Georgian Party, a culturally conservative group which promised to normalize relations with Russia. In 2012, Subari became a member of the Georgian Dream party, founded by the billionaire Bidzina Ivanishvili, whose coalition won the 2012 parliamentary election. After this, Subari became Minister of Corrections and Legal Assistance in the cabinet of Bidzina Ivanishvili on 25 October 2012, succeeding Giorgi Tughushi, his onetime successor as an ombudsman.

On 2 August 2022, Subari co-founded the People's Power, a sovereignist offshoot of the ruling Georgian Dream party. The movement accused the Georgian foreign-funded NGOs of being "foreign agents" and proposed a legislation to curb the foreign influence. The bill was withdrawn after mass protests on 7 March 2023.
