= Nikoloz Gagua =

Georgian politician (born 1975)

Nikoloz Gagua ნიკოლოზ გაგუა

Minister of Finance
- In office 20 June 2018 – 12 July 2018
- Prime Minister: Mamuka Bakhtadze
- Preceded by: Mamuka Bakhtadze
- Succeeded by: Ivane Machavariani

Personal details
- Born: 21 June 1975 (age 51)
- Education: Williams College; Tbilisi State University

Nikoloz Gagua (Georgian: ნიკოლოზ გაგუა; born June 21, 1975) is a Georgian politician who served as the Minister of Finance from 21 June until 12 July 2018, and served as the Deputy Minister of Finance until 2021, a position he previously held from November 2016 until June 2018. Right now he is member of the Council of the National Bank of Georgia and the vice-president of the same institution.

Gagua graduated from the Tbilisi State University in 1997 with the specialization in economics. He got the MA degree in economics at Vienna University (1998) and Williams College (2013) as well.

Political offices
Preceded by Mamuka Bakhtadze	Minister of Finance; 2018	Succeeded by Ivane Machavariani
