= Lasha Khutsishvili =

Georgian politician (born 1985)

- ლაშა ხუციშვილი

Minister of Finance
- Incumbent
- Assumed office 1 April 2021
- President: Salome Zourabichvili; Mikheil Kavelashvili
- Prime Minister: Irakli Garibashvili; Irakli Kobakhidze
- Preceded by: Ivane Matchavariani

Personal details
- Born: 2 September 1985 (age 40) Tbilisi, Georgia
- Citizenship: Georgia
- Party: Georgian Dream

Lasha Khutsishvili (Georgian: ლაშა ხუციშვილი; born 2 September 1985) is a Georgian politician who has been Minister of Finance of Georgia since 1 April 2021.

== Education ==
He was educated at the European High School of Management-Tbilisi (Bachelor's degree in Business Administration) and Preston University (Bachelor of Arts in General Management).

== Career ==
- February 2014 – April 2021 – Deputy Minister of Finance of Georgia
- July 2016 – September 2020 – Elected Member of the Steering Group of the OECD/G20 Inclusive Framework on BEPS (Base erosion and profit shifting)
- January 2013 – February 2014 – Director General, Georgia Revenue Service
- January 2008 – 2013 – Ernst & Young LLC Tbilisi Office, Tax & Legal
- 2007–2008 – Member, The Council of Tax Resolution, Ministry of Finance of Georgia
