= Ivane Matchavariani =

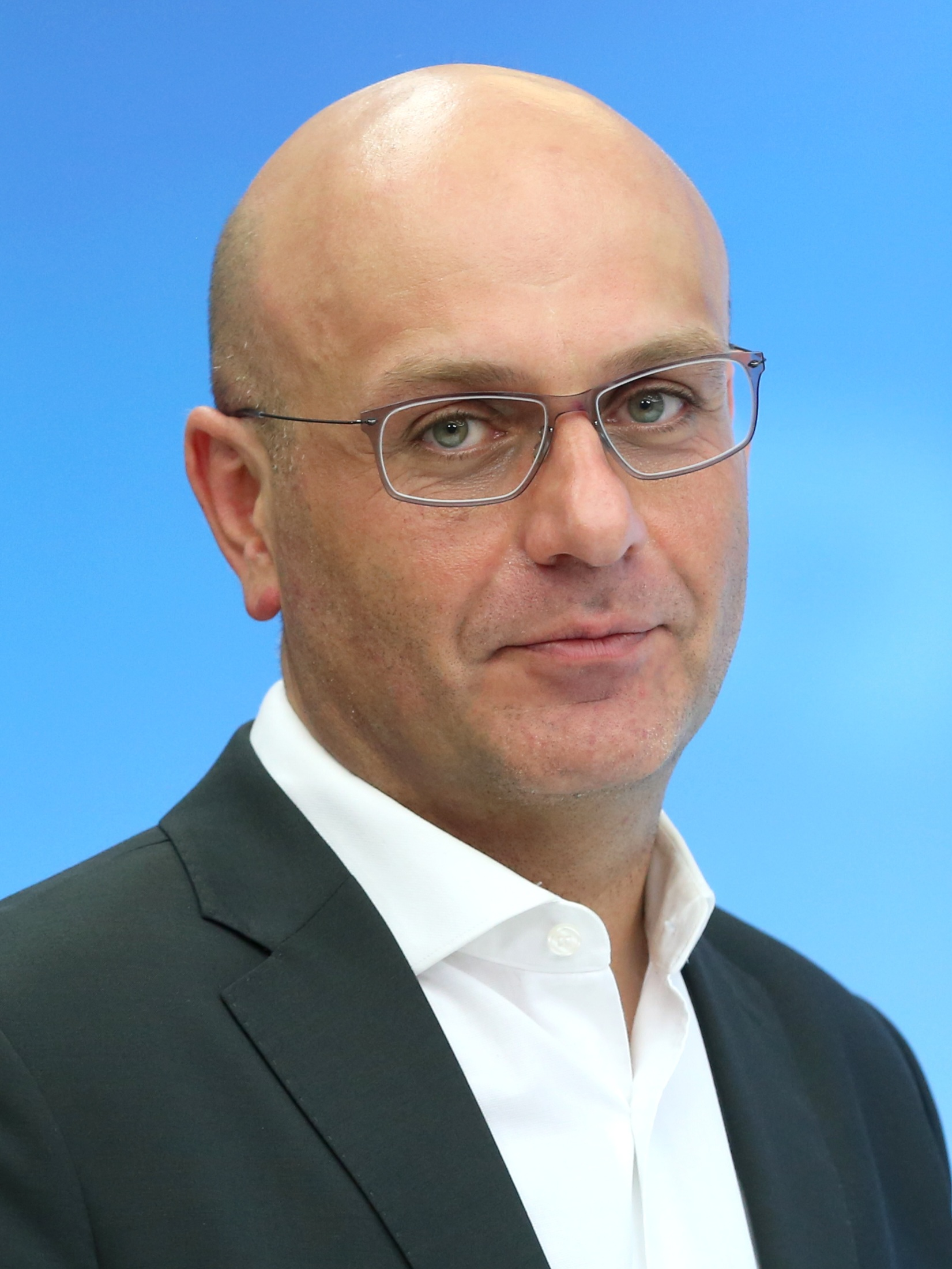

Deputy Prime Minister of Georgia
- In office 22 February 2021 – 31 March 2021
- President: Salome Zourabichvili
- Prime Minister: Irakli Garibashvili
- Preceded by: Thea Tsulukiani
- Succeeded by: Thea Tsulukiani

Minister of Finance
- In office 12 July 2018 – 31 March 2021
- President: Giorgi Margvelashvili; Salome Zourabichvili
- Prime Minister: Mamuka Bakhtadze; Giorgi Gakharia; Irakli Garibashvili
- Preceded by: Nikoloz Gagua
- Succeeded by: Lasha Khutsishvili

Personal details
- Born: 11 February 1974 (age 52) Tbilisi, Georgian SSR, USSR
- Party: Georgian Dream
- Education: Tbilisi State University

Angela Merkel visiting Georgia

Ivane Matchavariani (Georgian: ივანე მაჭავარიანი; born February 11, 1974) Georgian businessman, economist, former Vice Prime Minister and Finance Minister of Georgia. Prior to becoming a member of the Georgian government, Matchavariani worked in various positions at Geocell LLC part of the TeliaSonera group for 21 years.

== Ministerial career ==
On July 12, 2018, Ivane Matchavariani was appointed as a Minister of Finance of Georgia. From the period of his appointment as a Minister of Finance of Georgia in 2018 to his resignation in 2021, Ivane Maatchavariani initiated and actively participated in numerous reforms: Pension reform, VAT refund reform, insolvency legislation, harmonizing tax and custom code to European legislation, PPP Law, Capital Market reform, and many more.

In 2019 after a seven-year-long pause all three rating agencies (S&P FITCH, MOODY’S) raised Georgia's investment rating by one notch reaching BB. Also during Matchavariani's ministerial tenure Georgia achieved the highest level of transparency in public finance management, bringing the country to the position of the top five in the open budget index.

In August 2019 after the appointment of Prime Minister Giorgi Gakharia, Ivane Matchavariani remained on the post of the Minister of Finance of Georgia in Prime Minister Gakharia's cabinet of ministers.

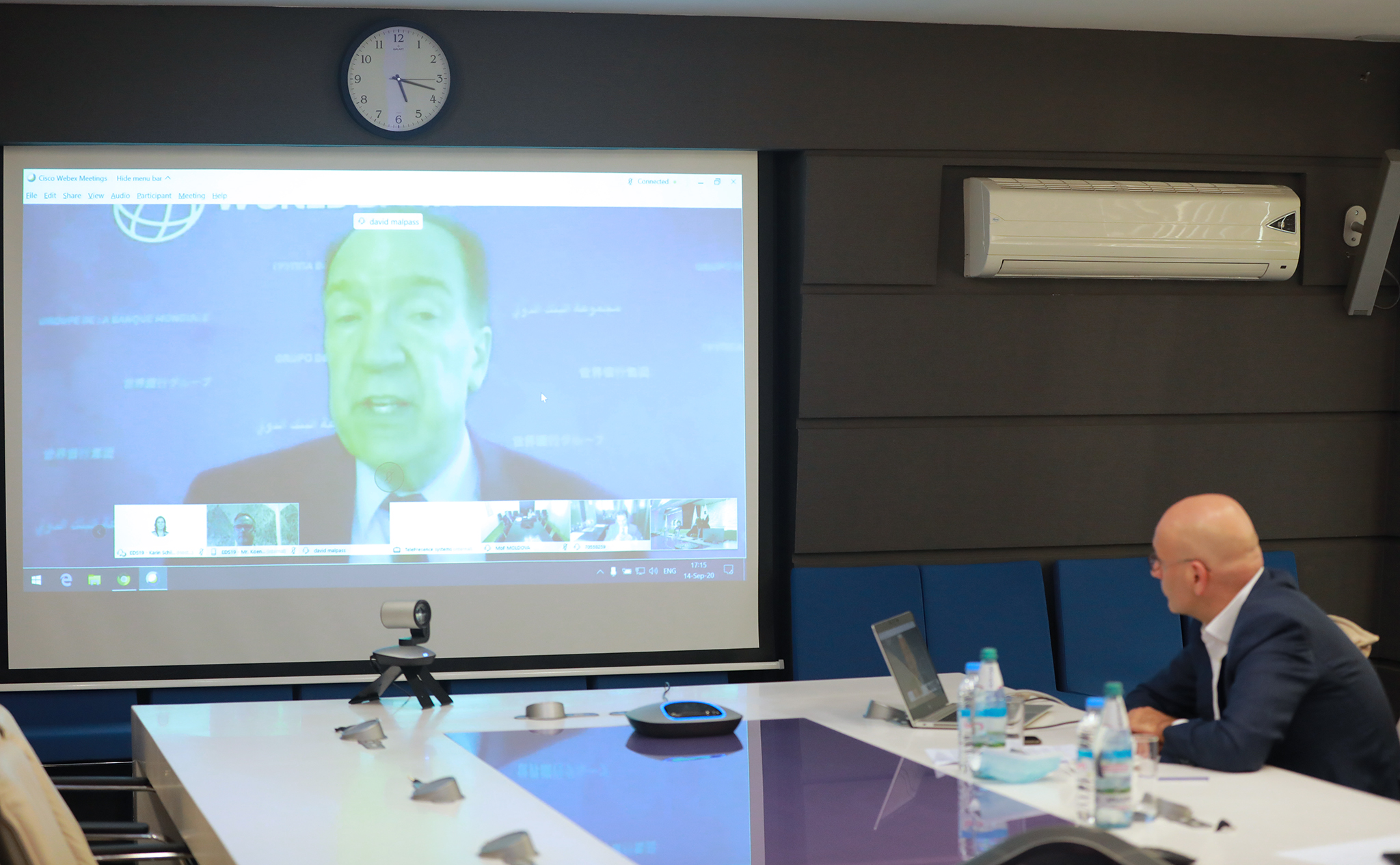
Discussing challenges caused by global COVID-19 pandemic with David Malpass

In the period of the COVID-19 pandemic in 2020, Ivane Matchavariani actively conducted negotiations for accumulating financial resources through various international financial institutions. As a result, Georgia became one of the largest recipients of financial assistance per capita.

From September 2020 Matchavariani was the managing director of the Asian Infrastructure Investment Bank (AIIB).

In 2020 after winning the parliamentary elections, the Georgian Dream party completed the government where Matchavariani has been appointed as the Minister of Finance for the third time. In February 2021 after resignation of Prime Minister Gakharia, Ivane Matchavariani was appointed as the Vice Prime Minister by the new Prime Minister Irakli Gharibashvili.

On March 31, 2021, Ivane Matchavariani resigned from the post of Minister of Finance and the Vice Prime Minister of Georgia.

== Early life and education ==
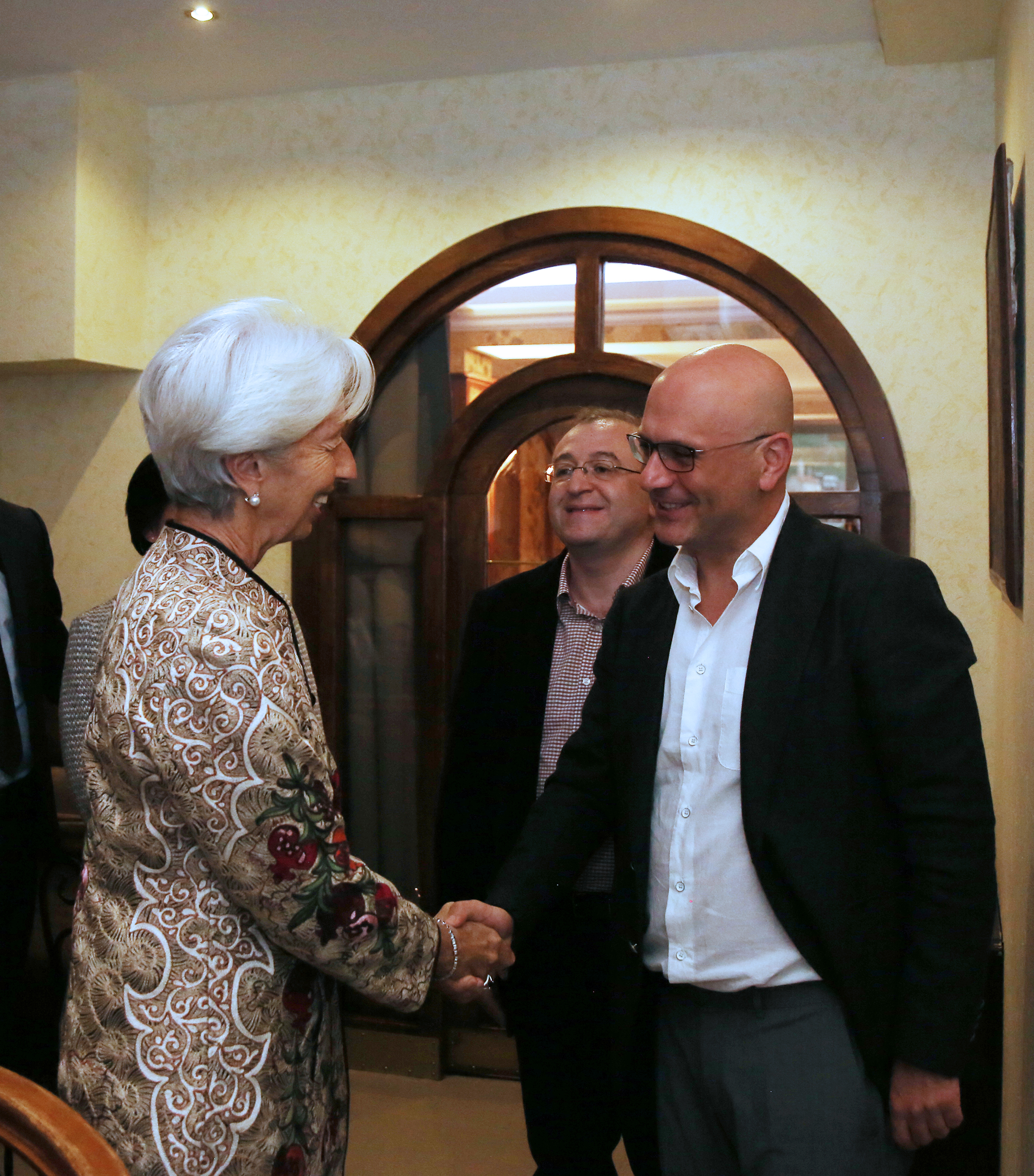
Christine Lagarde visiting Georgia

Ivane Matchavariani was born on February 11, 1974, into a family of medical doctors in Tbilisi, Georgia. His father Otar Matchavariani was a psychiatrist. His mother Irina Gigineishvili – a gynecologist. Matchavariani's paternal grandfather Ivane Matchavariani served as a regiment commander during WWII. Maternal grandfather Polikarpe Gigineishvili, was a prominent Georgian agriculturalist, doctor of science, and scholar. In the years 1960 to 1964 and later in 1971 Polikarpe Gigineishvili served as an adviser in Agricultural affairs to the President of Vietnam, Ho Chi Minh. Ivane Matchavariani graduated from Tbilisi secondary school #23 in 1991. In 1996 he graduated from Ivane Javakhishvili Tbilisi State University with a master's degree in Economics. Ivane Matchavariani is Fluent in English and Russian.

== Business career ==
Ivane Matchavariani worked at Geocell LLC for 21 years holding a variety of managerial positions at the company. From June 2006 to May 2013 he was the Chief Financial Officer of Geocell, and from May 2013 to May 2018 he served as a Chief Commercial Officer of Geocell.

== Personal life ==
He has been married since 1999 and has two children.

== Other activities ==
- Asian Infrastructure Investment Bank (AIIB), Ex-Officio Member of the Board of Governors (since 2018)
- European Bank for Reconstruction and Development (EBRD), Ex-Officio Member of the Board of Governors (since 2018)
- International Monetary Fund (IMF), Ex-Officio Alternate Member of the Board of Governors (since 2018)
- Multilateral Investment Guarantee Agency (MIGA), World Bank Group, Ex-Officio Member of the Board of Governors (since 2018)
- World Bank, Ex-Officio Member of the Board of Governors (since 2018)
