= Ministry of Sport and Youth Affairs of Georgia =

Government ministry of Georgia

Ministry of Sport & Youth Affairs of Georgia
- საქართველოს სპორტისა და ახალგაზრდობის საქმეთა სამინისტრო
- Coat of arms of Georgia

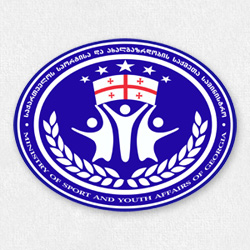

Agency overview
- Formed: June 30, 2010
- Dissolved: December 15, 2017
- Headquarters: Cholokashvili str. N9, Tbilisi, Georgia 0134
- Annual budget: ₾55 million (2015)
- Website: www.msy.gov.ge

The Ministry of Sport & Youth Affairs of Georgia (Georgian: საქართველოს სპორტისა და ახალგაზრდობის საქმეთა სამინისტრო, sakartvelos sportisa da akhalgazrdobis sakmeta saministro) was a governmental agency within the Cabinet of Georgia in charge of regulating activities related to sports and youth development in Georgia. In December 2017 the ministry was merged with that of Culture to form the Ministry of Culture and Sport.

== History ==
The ministry was established in 2010 as a result of restructuring activities within the Georgian government in June 2010. The preceding Ministry of Culture, Monuments Protection and Sports was split into two separate government agencies: Ministry of Sport and Youth Affairs and Ministry of Culture and Monument Protection. The split was made due to growing importance of sports among youth in Georgia. In 2010, the government allocated GEL 29,236.4 million to the ministry; in 2011 - 30,927.6 million.

== See also ==
- Cabinet of Georgia
