= Ministry of Culture and Sports of Georgia =

Government ministry of Georgia

Ministry of Culture, Sport and Youth of Georgia
- საქართველოს კულტურის, სპორტისა და ახალგაზრდობის სამინისტრო
- Coat of Arms of Georgia

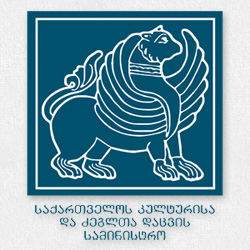

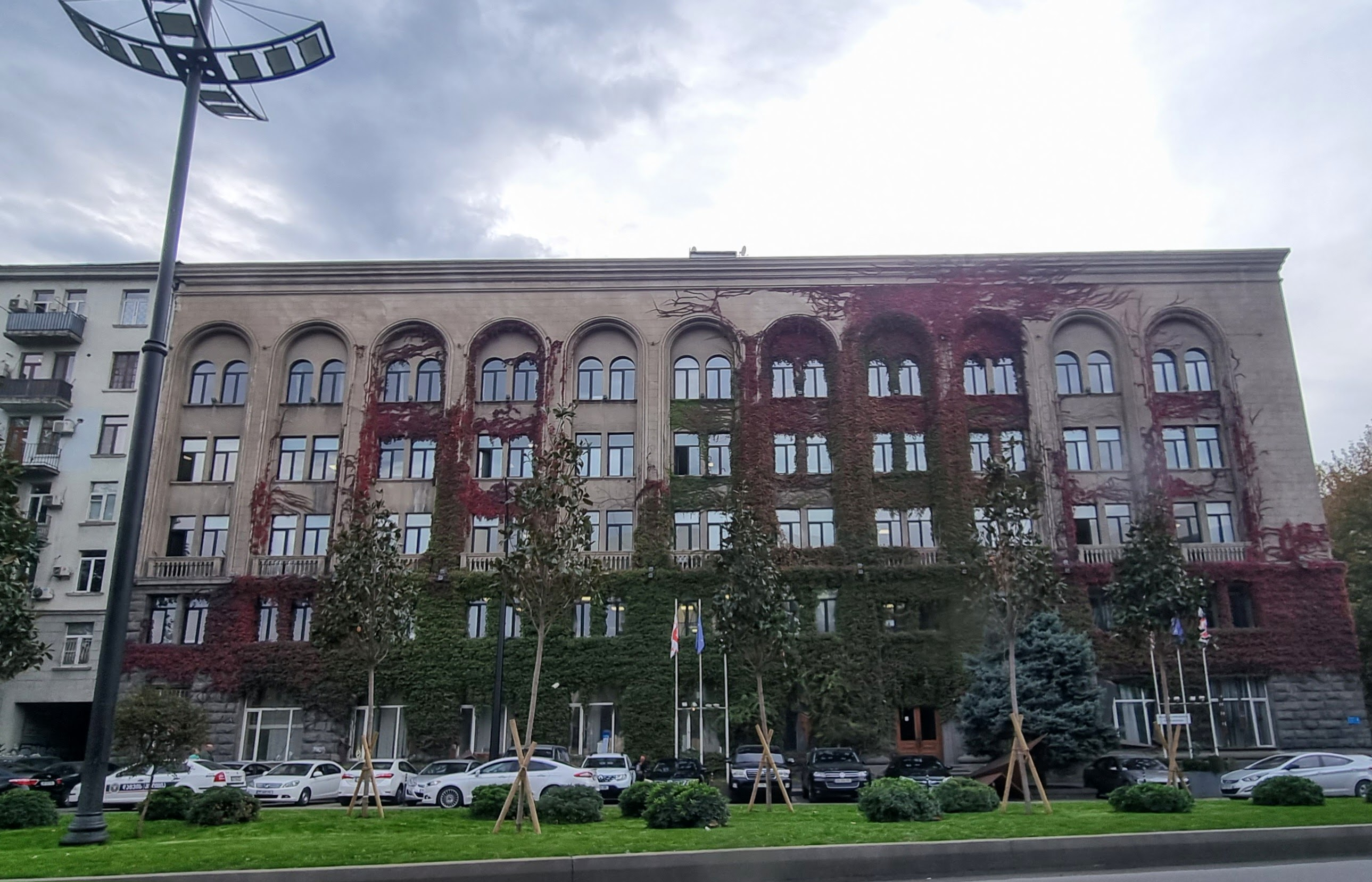

Agency overview
- Formed: 2010
- Jurisdiction: Government of Georgia
- Headquarters: Sanapiro Street q.4, Tbilisi, Georgia 0102
- Annual budget: ₾431.23 million (USD 162.4 million) (2023).
- Agency executive: Tea Tsulukiani (22 March 2021–Disputed), Minister of Culture, Sport and Youth
- Website: culture.gov.ge

The Ministry of Culture, Sport and Youth of Georgia (Georgian: საქართველოს კულტურის, სპორტისა და ახალგაზრდობის სამინისტრო, sakartvelos kulturisa da sportis saministro) is a governmental agency within the Cabinet of Georgia. It is in charge of regulating activities related to preservation of Georgian culture and its cultural monuments as well as activities related to sports and youth development.

== History ==
The ministry was established in 2010 as a result of restructuring activities within the Georgian government in June 2010. The preceding Ministry of Culture, Monuments Protection and Sports was split into two separate government agencies: Ministry of Sport and Youth Affairs and Ministry of Culture and Monument Protection. The agency was merged with the Ministry of Education and Science in July 2018. The Ministry of Culture, Sport and Youth was separated from the Ministry of Education and Science and reestablished as a standalone agency in 2021, by the decree of the prime minister.

== Structure ==
The ministry is headed by the minister aided by the first deputy minister in charge of Cultural Heritage Strategy, Organizations Coordination and Permissions, and International Programs and Georgian Culture Popularization departments; and three deputies in charge of Administrative, Events and Regional Coordination and Legal departments. Parliament exercises control over the ministry's activities. The budget of the ministry in 2010 was GEL 54,977,500 roughly equal to € 21,991,000. By 2023, also with an expanded portfolio, the budget of the ministry was GEL 431.23 million, also with a GEL 30.4 million increase over 2022 funding.

== Budget ==
The budget of the Ministry of Foreign Affairs in 2023 is GEL 431.23 million (USD 162.4 million), up by GEL 30.4 million (USD 11.4 million) compared to the 2022 state budget.

== Ministers after 2004 ==
- Giorgi Gabashvili, 17 February 2004 – 30 January 2008
- Nikoloz Vacheishvili, 31 January 2008 – 2 November 2008
- Grigol Vashadze, 2 November 2008 – 6 December 2008
- Nikoloz Rurua, 9 December 2008 – 25 October 2012
- Guram Odisharia, 25 October 2012 – 21 July 2014
- Mikheil Giorgadze, 23 July 2014 – 12 July 2018
- Mikheil Batiashvili, 12 July 2018 – 7 November 2019
- Mikheil Chkhenkeli, 13 November 2019 — 22 March 2021
- Thea Tsulukiani, 22 March 2021 – 18 October 2024
- Tinatin Rukhadze, 18 October 2024 – 28 July 2026
- Maia Bitadze, 15 September 2026–

== See also ==
- Cabinet of Georgia
- List of monuments in Georgia
