= Ministry of Corrections of Georgia =

Government ministry of Georgia

- საქართველოს სასჯელაღსრულებისა და პრობაციის სამინისტრო
- Coat of Arms of Georgia

- Logo

Agency overview
- Formed: February 1, 2009
- Dissolved: July 14, 2018
- Jurisdiction: Government of Georgia
- Headquarters: Sandro Euli st. No.3, Tbilisi, Georgia 0186
- Annual budget: ₾155 million (2015)
- Agency executive: Kakha Khakhishvili, Minister of Corrections of Georgia
- Website: www.moc.gov.ge

The Ministry of Corrections of Georgia (Georgian: საქართველოს სასჯელაღსრულებისა და პრობაციის სამინისტრო) was a governmental agency of Georgia in charge of regulating activities in the state penitentiary system. Its head office was in Tbilisi.

The ministry was established on February 1, 2009, in accordance with The Law of Georgia on Structure, Proxy and Activity Rule of the Government of Georgia. The agency was dissolved on 14 July 2018 as part of the cabinet structural reforms and merged with the Ministry of Justice.

== About the Ministry ==
The Ministry of Corrections and Probation was founded on February 1, 2009. The Ministry is a body of executive authority created on the basis of Georgian Constitution and “the law of Georgia on the Structure, Authority and Rules of Operation of the Government of Georgia”.

== Governing areas of the Ministry include ==
- Conducting the unified state policy in the area of corrections;
- Organizing execution of imprisonment and detention under the legislation of Georgia and providing unified management of penitentiary facilities and their functions;
- Provision of crime prevention and re-socialization of convicts;
- Execution of non-custodial penalties and probation acts;
- Providing trainings and upgrading qualifications of personnel of the system of the Ministry.

The Ministry provides the implementation of its functions through the structural subdivisions and legal entities working under its remit. The legal entities working under remit of the Ministry are: Non-custodial Penalties and Probation National Agency and Penitentiary and Probation Training Centre. The priorities of the Ministry are: maximal approximation to European standards; providing decent conditions of serving the sentence; protection human rights; provision of rehabilitation/re-socialization of convicts through individual approach and promoting their reintegration in the society. Multilateral reforms are being implemented in the system of the Ministry, which are aimed to improve the human rights conditions of convicts; to establish modern systems of management; re-socialization/rehabilitation of convicts; to improve the service of penitentiary health care; employment of convicts, etc. Many innovations have been implemented in the penitentiary system with the initiative of the Ministry; the infrastructure of the correctional facilities is being improved, as a result of which, serving sentence is provided in decent conditions according to the western standards. The Ministry of Corrections and Probation is still proceeding the establishment of innovations and implementation of new projects in order to fulfil the duties and, in this process, puts great importance to sharing the experiences of partner organizations and friend countries.
