= Thea Tsulukiani =

Georgian politician (born 1975)

- თეა წულუკიანი
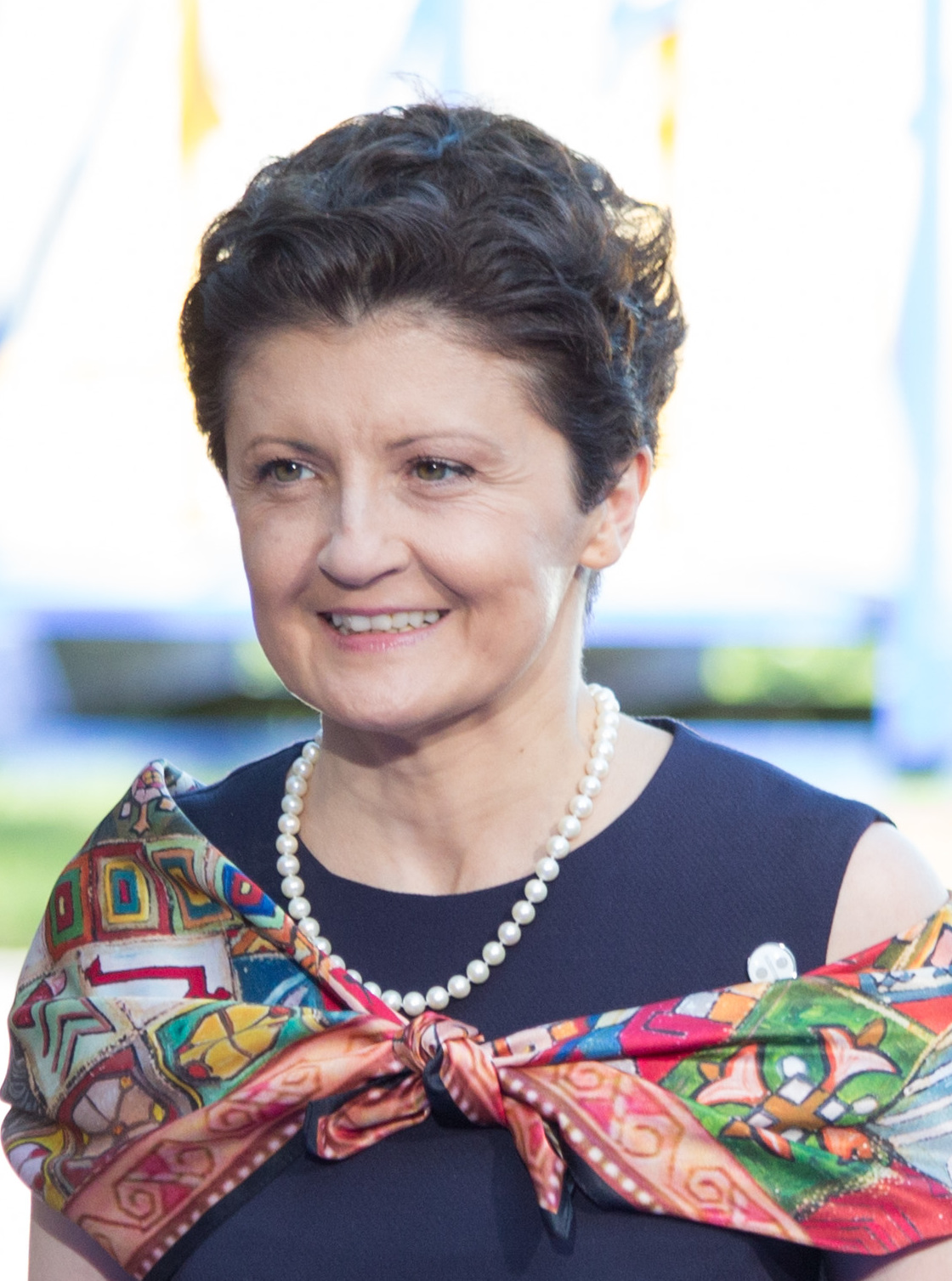
- Tsulukiani in 2017

Deputy Prime Minister of Georgia
- In office 31 March 2021 – 25 September 2024 Serving with Irakli Chikovani
- Prime Minister: Irakli Garibashvili; Irakli Kobakhidze
- Preceded by: Ivane Matchavariani
- In office 13 September 2019 – 1 October 2020
- Prime Minister: Giorgi Gakharia
- Preceded by: Giorgi Gakharia
- Succeeded by: Ivane Matchavariani

Minister of Culture, Sport and Youth
- In office 22 March 2021 – 25 September 2024
- Prime Minister: Irakli Garibashvili; Irakli Kobakhidze
- Preceded by: office re-established

Minister of Justice
- In office 25 October 2012 – 1 October 2020
- Prime Minister: Bidzina Ivanishvili; Irakli Garibashvili; Giorgi Kvirikashvili; Mamuka Bakhtadze; Giorgi Gakharia
- Preceded by: Zurab Adeishvili
- Succeeded by: Gocha Lortkipanidze

Member of the Parliament of Georgia
- Incumbent
- Assumed office 25 November 2024
- In office 11 December 2020 – 30 March 2021
- In office 21 October 2012 – 7 November 2012

Personal details
- Born: 21 January 1975 (age 51) Tbilisi, Georgian SSR, Soviet Union
- Party: Georgian Dream (2014-present); Free Democrats (2010-2014)
- Spouse: Nugzar Kakulia
- Children: 1 daughter
- Education: École nationale d'administration
- Website: Ministry of Justice of Georgia

Thea Tsulukiani (Georgian: თეა წულუკიანი; born 21 January 1975) is a Georgian politician who is currently Member of Parliament for the ruling Georgian Dream and is chair of the Tsulukiani Commission, investigating the alleged crimes of the previous government of United National Movement in 2003-2012. Previously she served as Minister of Justice (2012-2020), Minister of Culture, Sport and Youth (2021-2024) and Deputy Prime Minister (2021-2024).

== Education and professional career ==
Tsulukiani holds MPA degree from École Nationale d'Administration (ENA) in France (Averroès 1998-2000). She also holds the degree in international law and international relations and a diploma from the Academy of Diplomacy of the Ministry of Foreign Affairs of Georgia.

Tsulukiani has 10 years of experience as a lawyer at the European Court of Human Rights in Strasbourg (ECHR) where at the same time she served as a member of the Committee for Rules of Court and as a rapporteur on the cases examined by single-judge compositions.

== Political career ==
Tsulukiani ran in 2012 as a candidate for the Free Democrats, part of the six-party coalition of Georgian Dream, and was elected as Member of Parliament for Nazaladevi, a single- mandate constituency of the capital, with 72% of the vote. She subsequently served two terms as the Minister of Justice in subsequent Georgian Dream governments, from 2012 until 2020. Upon the withdrawal of the Free Democrats from the government and the parliamentary majority in 2014, Tsulukiani stayed with Georgian Dream.

She was the chairperson of 8 Inter-agency Councils in the Government of Georgia, among them the Criminal Justice Reform Council, the Anti-corruption Council, the Anti-drug, Anti-torture and Anti-trafficking Councils as well as the State Commission on Migration Issues and the Inter-agency Commission for Free and Fair Elections. Under her tenure, the court system in Georgia underwent several waves of reform. Her critics have argued that during this period Tsulukiani empowered a clan of judges, to ensure that courts return politically favourable decisions. She resigned on 29 September 2020, effective 1 October, when she was put on the candidate list of Georgian Dream for the 2020 elections.

She became member of Parliament in December 2020, but in March 2021, Tsulukiani was appointed Minister of Culture and Deputy Prime Minister. During her tenure as culture minister, she was criticised for removing experienced cultural managers, and instead appointing political loyalists, across the film, literature, music and museum sectors. In September 2024 she resigned, to be a candidate for Georgian Dream for the parliamentary elections and became member of parliament in November 2024. Tsulukiani then became chair of the so-called "Tsulukiani Commission", which investigated the alleged crimes of the previous government of the United National Movement in 2003-2012.
