= Ekaterine Tikaradze =

Georgian politician

Ekaterina Tikaradze
- ეკატერინე (ეკა) ტიკარაძე
- Born: March 3, 1976 (age 49); Tbilisi, Georgia
- Known for: Former Minister of Health in Georgia
- Title: Minister of Health in Georgia
- Term: 2019-2021
- Children: 2

Ekaterine (Eka) Tikaradze (Georgian: ეკატერინე (ეკა) ტიკარაძე, romanized: ek'at'erine (ek'a) t'ik'aradze; b. 3 March 1976) is a Georgian politician who was Minister of Internally Displaced Persons from the Occupied Territories of Georgia, Labor, Health and Social Affairs of Georgia since 18 June beginning 2019, and managed the largest budget among ministries. She resigned on 9 December 2021, remaining in office until the start of 2022, but announced that she planned to continue working as a political council with the Georgian Dream party.

== Biography ==
Tikaradze was born in 1976 on March 3 in Tbilisi.

=== Education ===
She studied at Tbilisi State Medical University during 1993 to 1998, eventually passing the qualification to become a physician. In 2005, she received a certificate of general profile dentistry.

She completed a full course in maxillofacial implantation at Ludwigshafen Academy of Practice and Science in 2008.

In 2016, she completed the course in Munster, Germany, and received a management competence in the hospitality sector.

=== Career ===
She was the Project Development Manager of the foundation Dentists Without Borders from 2006 to 2008.

From 2008 to 2013, she worked in Switzerland, was a tertiary hospital and the countries of the insurance sector development consultant.

2009 - 2015 she was a legal entity "Dostakari" ( Sachkhere ) Dental Clinic Manager conceptual issues.

2015 – 2019 years JSC General Director of Sachkhere District Hospital Polyclinic Association.

2015 - 2019 she was a legal entity "Dostakari" ( Sachkhere ) Executive Director.

2016 - 2019 she has become a Master of Management and Business Administration.

On 9 December 2022, she resigned from her position as Minister, continuing to hold the office until the end of the year. No motive was given for her resignation.

== Views and decisions ==
- Claimed in December 16 of 2020 that rich figures in the ruling party tried pushing her out to protect 'big business interests'.
- In early 2021, stated to Parliament that “Some doctors are paid 300 Laris [USD 97] a month, while others get 120,000 [USD 39,000]. You will probably agree this is unfair.”
- Discussed setting up Georgian assistance to Armenia regarding the COVID-19 pandemic with Arsen Torosyan, the Armenian Minister of Health.
- Authorized the Emergency Coordination and Emergency Assistance Center "to provide one-time financial assistance to a family in the amount of not more than GEL 10,000 in case of death of an employee of the (COVID-19) Center due to infection with the new coronavirus (SARS-CoV-2)" in November 2020.

== Personal life ==
She is married and has two children. She is fluent in Georgian, English, German, and Russian.
