= Ketevan Tsikhelashvili =

Georgian politician

Ketevan Tsikhelashvili (Georgian: ქეთევან ციხელაშვილი; 21 August 1978) was the State Minister for Reconciliation and Civic Equality in Georgia from 2016 to 2020. In 2020, she became an ambassador to Austria.

== Biography ==
Ketevan was born in 1978. She worked at the Ministry of Foreign Affairs Research and Analysis Center from 1998 to 1999. She completed her Bachelor of Arts from the Tbilisi State University in International relations in 1999. In 2000, she completed her Masters of Art in International Relations and European Studies from Central European University.

== Career ==
In 2001, she worked at the NATO Parliamentary Assembly as a research assistant. She worked in the State Minister for Conflict Resolution Office from 2004 to 2006. She founded the Pro-European integration think tank Liberal Academy Tbilisi in 2006. She worked as a Coordinator of Projects at the German Friedrich Naumann Foundation. She joined Ilia State University as a lecturer in 2008. In Spring 2011, she worked on academic research at the University of Fribourg in Switzerland. From 2012 she was the Chairwoman of the Eastern Partnership Civil Society Forum. She is a PhD candidate at Ilia State University in Philosophy and Social Sciences. In 2016 she was made the Minister for Reconciliation and Civil Equality in Georgia. She was appointed by President Giorgi Margvelashvili.

In May 2020, the Minister of Foreign Affairs, Davit Zalkaliani, announced that Tsikhelashvili had been appointed as an ambassador to Austria and would transition from her duties as State Minister in June that year. It has not yet been revealed who shall succeed her as State Minister.
