= Prime Minister of Georgia =

Head of government

- საქართველოს პრემიერ-მინისტრი (Georgian)
- Coat of arms of Georgia

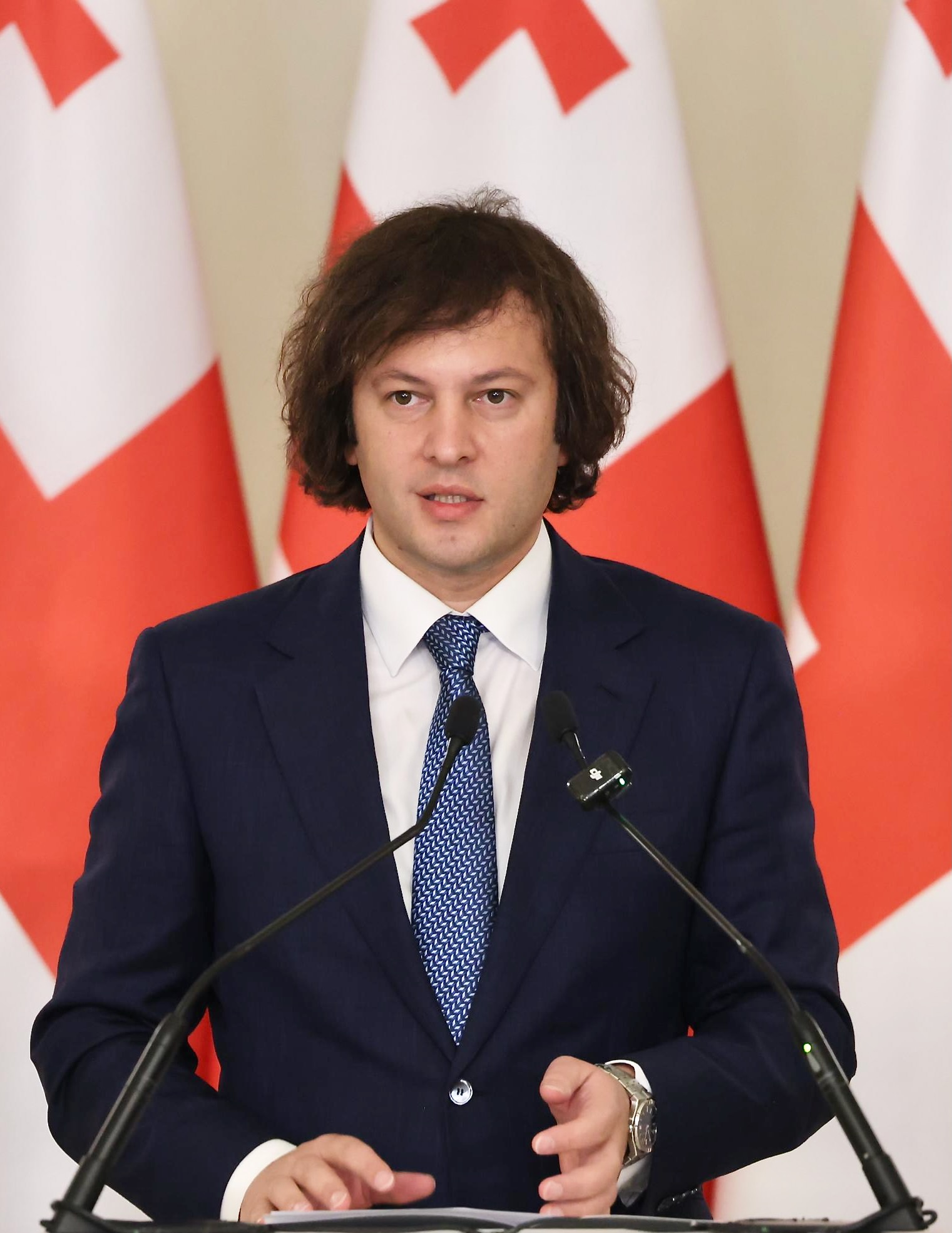
- Incumbent; Irakli Kobakhidze (Note: Due to the disputed 2024 Georgian parliamentary election, Kobakhidze is no longer recognized as a legitimate Prime Minister of Georgia by all elected opposition parties, outgoing president Salome Zourabichvili, and Georgian constitutional experts.) since 8 February 2024
- Administration of the Government of Georgia
- Style: Mr. Prime Minister (informal); His Excellency (diplomatic)
- Type: Head of government
- Member of: Cabinet; National Security Council
- Reports to: Parliament
- Seat: State Chancellery
- Nominator: Parliament
- Appointer: President
- Term length: No fixed term length
- Constituting instrument: Constitution of Georgia
- Formation: 26 May 1918; 108 years ago
- First holder: Noe Ramishvili (Georgian Democratic Republic)
- Deputy: First Deputy Prime Minister
- Salary: ₾13,000 / US$5,019 per month
- Website: Official website

The prime minister of Georgia (Georgian: საქართველოს პრემიერ-მინისტრი, romanized: sakartvelos p'remier-minist'ri) is the head of government and chief executive of Georgia.

In Georgia, the president is a ceremonial head of state and mainly acts as a figurehead. The executive power is vested in the government. The prime minister organizes, directs, and controls the functions of the government. They also sign legal acts and appoint and dismiss cabinet ministers. The prime minister represents Georgia in foreign relations and concludes international treaties on behalf of Georgia. They are accountable for the activities of the government before the Parliament of Georgia.

The prime minister is nominated by a political party that has secured the best results in the parliamentary election. The nominee must win the confidence vote of the Parliament.

The current prime minister is Irakli Kobakhidze, who was nominated by the ruling Georgian Dream party on 2 February and his government was approved on 8 February, 2024.

== History ==
The office of prime minister under the name of the chairman of government was introduced in Georgia upon its declaration of independence in May 1918. It was abolished with the Soviet takeover of the country in February 1921. The newly independent Georgia established the position of prime minister in August 1991, only to be abolished de facto in the aftermath of the January 1992 military coup and legally in the 1995 Constitution. The office was reintroduced in the February 2004 constitutional amendment and further modified as a result of series of amendments passed between 2012 and 2018.

From the office's reestablishment in 2004 and throughout the presidency of Mikheil Saakashvili, the prime minister was appointed by the president and served as his chief adviser, while the President exercised most of the executive powers. However, after the entry into force of the 2012 and 2018 constitutional amendments, that instituted Georgia as a parliamentary republic, the president's executive powers were eliminated and transferred to the prime minister.

== Qualifications ==
The office of prime minister may not be held by a citizen of Georgia who is simultaneously the citizen of another country.

== Appointment ==
The prime minister is nominated by a political party that has secured the best results in the parliamentary election. The nominee for premiership and his ministerial candidates must win the confidence vote of the Parliament and then, within 2 days of a vote of confidence, be formally appointed by the president of Georgia. If the president does not appoint the prime minister within the established time frame, the prime minister will be appointed automatically. If the parliamentary vote of confidence is not passed within the established time frame, the president dissolves the Parliament no earlier than two weeks and no later than three weeks after the respective time frame has expired, and calls extraordinary parliamentary election.

== Functions ==
The prime minister of Georgia is the head of the government, responsible for government activities and appointment and dismissal of ministers. They are accountable before the parliament. The prime minister signs the legal acts of the government and countersigns some of the acts issued by the president of Georgia.

The prime minister has the right to use the defense forces without the Parliament's approval during martial law. During the martial law, the prime minister becomes a member of the National Defense Council, a consultative body chaired by the president of Georgia. Although it is the president who is officially the commander-in-chief, in practice, the military is managed by the Government and prime minister.

The prime minister is also the head of the National Security Council.

== List of officeholders ==
=== Democratic Republic of Georgia (1918–1921) ===
==== Chairman of Government (1918–1921) ====
No.	Portrait	Name (Birth–Death)	Term of office			Political party	Elected	Ref.
No.	Portrait	Name (Birth–Death)	Took office	Left office	Time in office	Political party	Elected	Ref.
1		Noe Ramishvili (1881–1930)	26 May 1918	24 June 1918	29 days	Social Democratic Party of Georgia		
2		Noe Zhordania (1868–1953)	24 June 1918	18 March 1921	2 years, 267 days	Social Democratic Party of Georgia	1919	

=== Georgian Soviet Socialist Republic (1921–1990) ===
==== Chairmen of the Council of People's Commissars (1921–1946) ====
No.	Portrait	Name (Birth–Death)	Term of office			Political party	Elected	Ref.
No.	Portrait	Name (Birth–Death)	Took office	Left office	Time in office	Political party	Elected	Ref.
1		Polikarp Mdivani (1887–1937)	7 March 1922	19 April 1922	43 days	Communist Party of Georgia	—	
2		Sergey Kavtaradze (1885–1971)	19 April 1922	21 January 1923	277 days	Communist Party of Georgia	—	
3		Shalva Eliava (1883–1937)	21 January 1923	14 June 1927	4 years, 144 days	Communist Party of Georgia	—	
4		Lavrenty Kartvelishvili (1890–1938)	14 June 1927	7 June 1929	1 year, 358 days	Communist Party of Georgia	—	
5		Filipp Makharadze (1886–1941)	1 June 1929	20 January 1931	1 year, 233 days	Communist Party of Georgia	—	
6		Levan Sukhishvili (?–?)	20 January 1931	22 September 1931	245 days	Communist Party of Georgia	—	
7		German Mgaloblishvili (?–1937)	22 September 1931	9 July 1937	5 years, 290 days	Communist Party of Georgia	—	
8		Valerian Bakradze (1901–1971)	9 July 1937	15 April 1946	8 years, 280 days	Communist Party of Georgia	1938	

==== Chairmen of the Council of Ministers (1946–1990) ====
No.	Portrait	Name (Birth–Death)	Term of office			Political party	Elected	Ref.
No.	Portrait	Name (Birth–Death)	Took office	Left office	Time in office	Political party	Elected	Ref.
8		Valerian Bakradze (1901–1971)	15 April 1946	26 March 1947	345 days	Communist Party of Georgia	—	
9		Zakhary Chkhubianishvili (1903–1980)	26 March 1947	6 April 1952	5 years, 11 days	Communist Party of Georgia	1947	
10		Zakhary Ketskhoveli (1902–1970)	6 April 1952	16 April 1953	1 year, 10 days	Communist Party of Georgia	1951	
(8)		Valerian Bakradze (1901–1971)	16 April 1953	20 September 1953	157 days	Communist Party of Georgia	—	
11		Givi Javakhishvili (1912–1985)	21 September 1953	17 December 1975	22 years, 88 days	Communist Party of Georgia	1955; 1959; 1963; 1967; 1971	
12		Zurab Aleksandrovich Pataridze (1928–1982)	17 December 1975	5 June 1982	6 years, 170 days	Communist Party of Georgia	1975; 1980	
13		Dmitry Kartvelishvili (1927–2009)	2 July 1982	12 April 1986	3 years, 284 days	Communist Party of Georgia	—	
15		Otar Cherkezia (1933–2004)	12 April 1986	29 March 1989	2 years, 351 days	Communist Party of Georgia	1985	
16		Zurab Chkheidze (1930–2007)	29 March 1989	14 April 1989	16 days	Communist Party of Georgia	—	
17		Nodari Chitanava (born 1936)	14 April 1989	15 November 1990	1 year, 215 days	Communist Party of Georgia	—	

=== Georgia (since 1990) ===
==== Prime minister (1990–1995) ====
No.	Portrait	Name (Birth–Death)	Term of office			Political party	Elected	Ref.
No.	Portrait	Name (Birth–Death)	Took office	Left office	Time in office	Political party	Elected	Ref.
1		Tengiz Sigua (1934–2020)	15 November 1990	18 August 1991	276 days	Rustaveli Society	1990	
—		Murman Omanidze (1938–2020) acting	18 August 1991	23 August 1991	5 days	Independent	—	
2		Besarion Gugushvili (born 1945)	23 August 1991	6 January 1992 (Note: Prime Minister of the rebel government at Zugdidi 24 September—6 November 1993)	136 days	Round Table—Free Georgia	—	
(1)		Tengiz Sigua (1934–2020)	6 January 1992	6 August 1993	1 year, 212 days	Independent	1992	
—		Eduard Shevardnadze (1928–2014) acting	6 August 1993	20 August 1993	14 days	Independent	—	
3		Otar Patsatsia (1929–2021)	20 August 1993	5 October 1995	2 years, 46 days	Independent	—	

==== State Minister (1995–2004) ====
No.	Portrait	Name (Birth–Death)	Term of office			Political party	Ref.
No.	Portrait	Name (Birth–Death)	Took office	Left office	Time in office	Political party	Ref.
1		Niko Lekishvili (1947–2025)	8 December 1995	26 July 1998	2 years, 230 days	Union of Citizens of Georgia	
2		Vazha Lortkipanidze (born 1949)	31 July 1998	11 May 2000	1 year, 285 days	Union of Citizens of Georgia	
3		Giorgi Arsenishvili (1942–2010)	11 May 2000	21 December 2001	1 year, 224 days	Union of Citizens of Georgia	
4		Avtandil Jorbenadze (1951–2024)	21 December 2001	25 November 2003	1 year, 339 days	Union of Citizens of Georgia	
5		Zurab Zhvania (1963–2005)	27 November 2003	17 February 2004	82 days	United National Movement	

==== Prime minister (2004–present) ====
No.	Portrait	Name (Birth–Death)	Term of office			Political party	Elected	Government(s)	Ref.
No.	Portrait	Name (Birth–Death)	Took office	Left office	Time in office	Political party	Elected	Government(s)	Ref.
4		Zurab Zhvania (1963–2005)	17 February 2004	3 February 2005†	352 days	United National Movement	2004	Zhvania	
—		Mikheil Saakashvili (born 1967) acting	3 February 2005	17 February 2005	14 days	United National Movement	—	Zhvania	
5		Zurab Noghaideli (born 1964)	17 February 2005	16 November 2007	2 years, 272 days	United National Movement	—	Noghaideli	
—		Giorgi Baramidze (born 1968) acting	16 November 2007	22 November 2007	6 days	United National Movement	—	Noghaideli	
6		Lado Gurgenidze (born 1970)	22 November 2007	1 November 2008	345 days	Independent	—	Gurgenidze	
7		Grigol Mgaloblishvili (born 1973)	1 November 2008	6 February 2009	97 days	Independent	2008	Mgaloblishvili	
8		Nika Gilauri (born 1975)	6 February 2009	4 July 2012	3 years, 149 days	Independent	—	Gilauri	
9		Vano Merabishvili (born 1968)	4 July 2012	25 October 2012	113 days	United National Movement	—	Merabishvili	
10		Bidzina Ivanishvili (born 1956)	25 October 2012	20 November 2013	1 year, 26 days	Georgian Dream	2012	Ivanishvili	
11		Irakli Garibashvili (born 1982)	20 November 2013	30 December 2015	2 years, 40 days	Georgian Dream	—	Garibashvili I	
12		Giorgi Kvirikashvili (born 1967)	30 December 2015	13 June 2018	2 years, 165 days	Georgian Dream	—	Kvirikashvili I	
12		Giorgi Kvirikashvili (born 1967)	30 December 2015	13 June 2018	2 years, 165 days	Georgian Dream	2016	Kvirikashvili II	
13		Mamuka Bakhtadze (born 1982)	20 June 2018	2 September 2019	1 year, 74 days	Georgian Dream	—	Bakhtadze	
14		Giorgi Gakharia (born 1975)	8 September 2019	18 February 2021	1 year, 163 days	Georgian Dream	—	Gakharia I	
14		Giorgi Gakharia (born 1975)	8 September 2019	18 February 2021	1 year, 163 days	Georgian Dream	2020	Gakharia II	
—		Maya Tskitishvili (born 1974)	18 February 2021	22 February 2021	4 days	Georgian Dream	—	Gakharia II	
15		Irakli Garibashvili (born 1982)	22 February 2021	29 January 2024	2 years, 341 days	Georgian Dream	—	Garibashvili II	
16		Irakli Kobakhidze (born 1978)	8 February 2024	Incumbent (Disputed)	2 years, 211 days	Georgian Dream	—	Kobakhidze I	
16		Irakli Kobakhidze (born 1978)	8 February 2024	Incumbent (Disputed)	2 years, 211 days	Georgian Dream	2024 (Note: Disputed by opposition parties)	Kobakhidze II	

== See also ==
- President of Georgia
