= Ministry of Internally Displaced Persons from the Occupied Territories, Accommodation and Refugees of Georgia =

Government ministry of Georgia

Ministry of Internally Displaced Persons from the Occupied Territories, Accommodation and Refugees
- საქართველოს ოკუპირებული ტერიტორიებიდან იძულებით გადაადგილებულ პირთა, განსახლებისა და ლტოლვილთა სამინისტრო
- Coat of Arms of Georgia

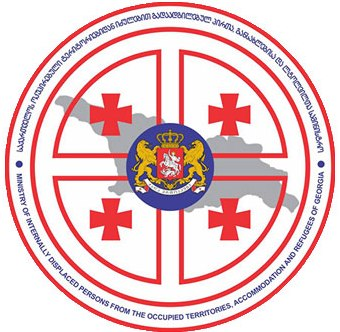
- Logo

Agency overview
- Formed: 1996
- Dissolved: 2018
- Jurisdiction: Government of Georgia
- Headquarters: Tamarashvili Street N 15A, Tbilisi, Georgia 0177
- Agency executive: Sozar Subari, Minister for Internally Displaced Persons from the Occupied Territories, Accommodation and Refugees
- Website: www.mra.gov.ge

The Ministry of Internally Displaced Persons from the Occupied Territories, Accommodation and Refugees of Georgia (Georgian: საქართველოს ოკუპირებული ტერიტორიებიდან იძულებით გადაადგილებულ პირთა, განსახლებისა და ლტოლვილთა სამინისტრო, sakartvelos okupirebuli teritoriebidan gadaadgilebul pirta, gansakhlebisa da ltolvilta saministro), also known as Ministry of Refugees and Accommodation of Georgia, was the Georgian government ministry within the Cabinet of Georgia, in charge of regulation of state policies on refugees and asylum seekers, internally displaced persons, repatriates, victims of natural disasters, their accommodation and migration control in the country. It functioned from 1996 until 2018, when the agency's various tasks were assigned to the ministries of Regional Development and Infrastructure, Interior Ministry, and Ministry of Labor, Health and Social Affairs.

The ministry's last head was Sozar Subari.

== Structure ==
The ministry is headed by the minister, aided by the First Deputy and three deputy ministers. The ministry oversees activities in development and implementation of state policy under Article 1, Paragraph 17 of the Law of Georgia on the "Structure of the Government, its Authority and the Rule of Operation". It has four functioning chapters in:

- Adjara and Samegrelo-Zemo Svaneti;
- Imereti, Guria, Racha-Lechkhumi and Kvemo Svaneti
- Kvemo Kartli, Mtskheta-Mtianeti and Kakheti
- Shida Kartli and Samtskhe-Javakheti

According to Georgian authorities, Georgia has had around 251,000 IDPs from Georgian–Abkhazian and Georgian–Ossetian conflicts, the number which increased by nearly 26,000 due to the Russo-Georgian War. The ministry found itself in the media spotlight when it tried to relocate 1,500 IDPs from Tbilisi to rural areas offering $10,000 or alternative housing to each family affected by conflict.

== See also ==
- Cabinet of Georgia
