= Mamuka Bakhtadze =

Georgian politician

- მამუკა ბახტაძე
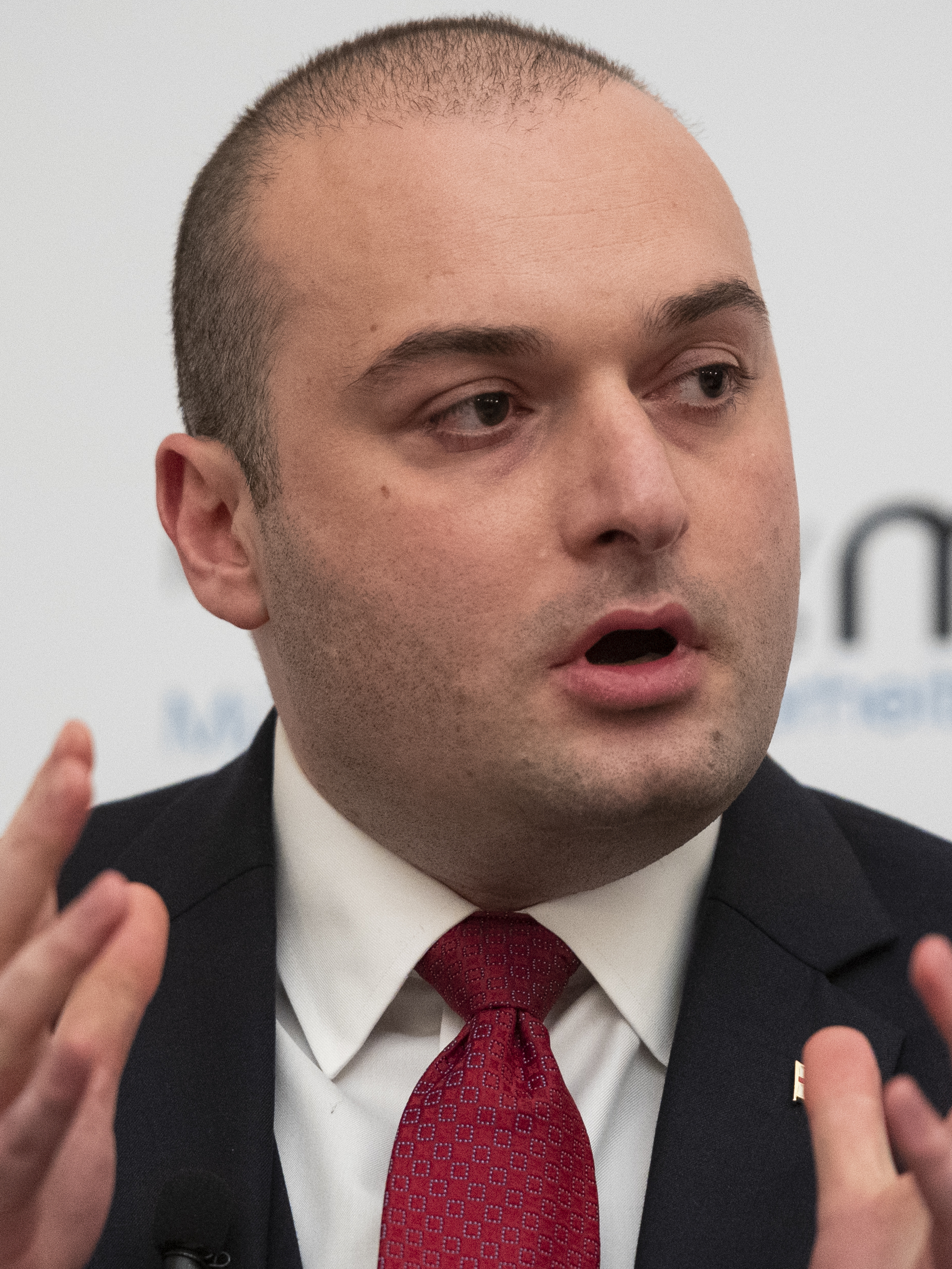
- Bakhtadze in 2019

13th Prime Minister of Georgia
- In office 20 June 2018 – 2 September 2019
- President: Giorgi Margvelashvili; Salome Zourabichvili
- Preceded by: Giorgi Kvirikashvili
- Succeeded by: Giorgi Gakharia

Minister of Finance
- In office 13 November 2017 – 13 June 2018
- President: Giorgi Margvelashvili
- Prime Minister: Giorgi Kvirikashvili
- Preceded by: Dimitri Kumsishvili
- Succeeded by: Nikoloz Gagua

Personal details
- Born: 9 June 1982 (age 44) Tbilisi, Georgian SSR, Soviet Union
- Party: Georgian Dream
- Education: Tbilisi State University, Georgian Technical University, Moscow State University

Mamuka Bakhtadze (Georgian: მამუკა ბახტაძე; born 9 June 1982) is a Georgian politician who served as the country's prime minister from 20 June 2018 until 2 September 2019. Bakhtadze announced his official statement about resignation via Facebook post. He had previously served as minister of finance (2017–2018) and, prior to that, executive director of the Georgian Railway company (2013–2017).

== Education and early career ==
Born in Tbilisi, Georgian SSR, then part of the Soviet Union, Bakhtadze graduated, in 2003, from the Tbilisi State University with a degree in management and microeconomics and from the Georgian Technical University with that in electromechanical engineering. He obtained MBA from the Moscow State University in 2005 and the INSEAD business school in 2010. After serving at the supervisory board of the Georgian International Energy Corporation from October 2010 to November 2012, Bakhtadze became CEO of Georgian Railway LLC, the state-owned railway company of Georgia, in March 2013.

== Government ==
On 13 November 2017, Bakhtadze was appointed minister of finance in the second cabinet of Giorgi Kvirikashvili. Kvirikashvili stepped down as prime minister on 13 June 2018, citing his differences with Bidzina Ivanishvili, a recently reappointed influential chairman of the ruling Georgian Dream party, and triggering the resignation of the entire cabinet.

Georgian Dream nominated Bakhtadze, 36 years old at that time, as Kvirikashvili's successor. By that time, he was largely a political unknown; 55% of respondents had not heard of him according to a survey conducted by the International Republican Institute in May 2018, two weeks before Bakhtadze's nomination. He was widely considered to have been Ivanishvili's personal choice and a close friend of the Ivanishvili family.

Bakhtadze's incoming cabinet won the parliamentary vote of confidence with 99 votes in favor to 6 against on 20 June 2018. The cabinet was reconfirmed, with 101 votes in favor to 12 against, by the parliament on 14 July after the previously announced structural reforms in the cabinet ministries were implemented. Bakhtadze pledged to continue Georgia's Euro-Atlantic integration and implement "fundamental and innovative reforms". Bakhtadze's nomination was heavily criticized by the parliamentary opposition, especially, European Georgia and United National Movement.

=== Prime minister ===
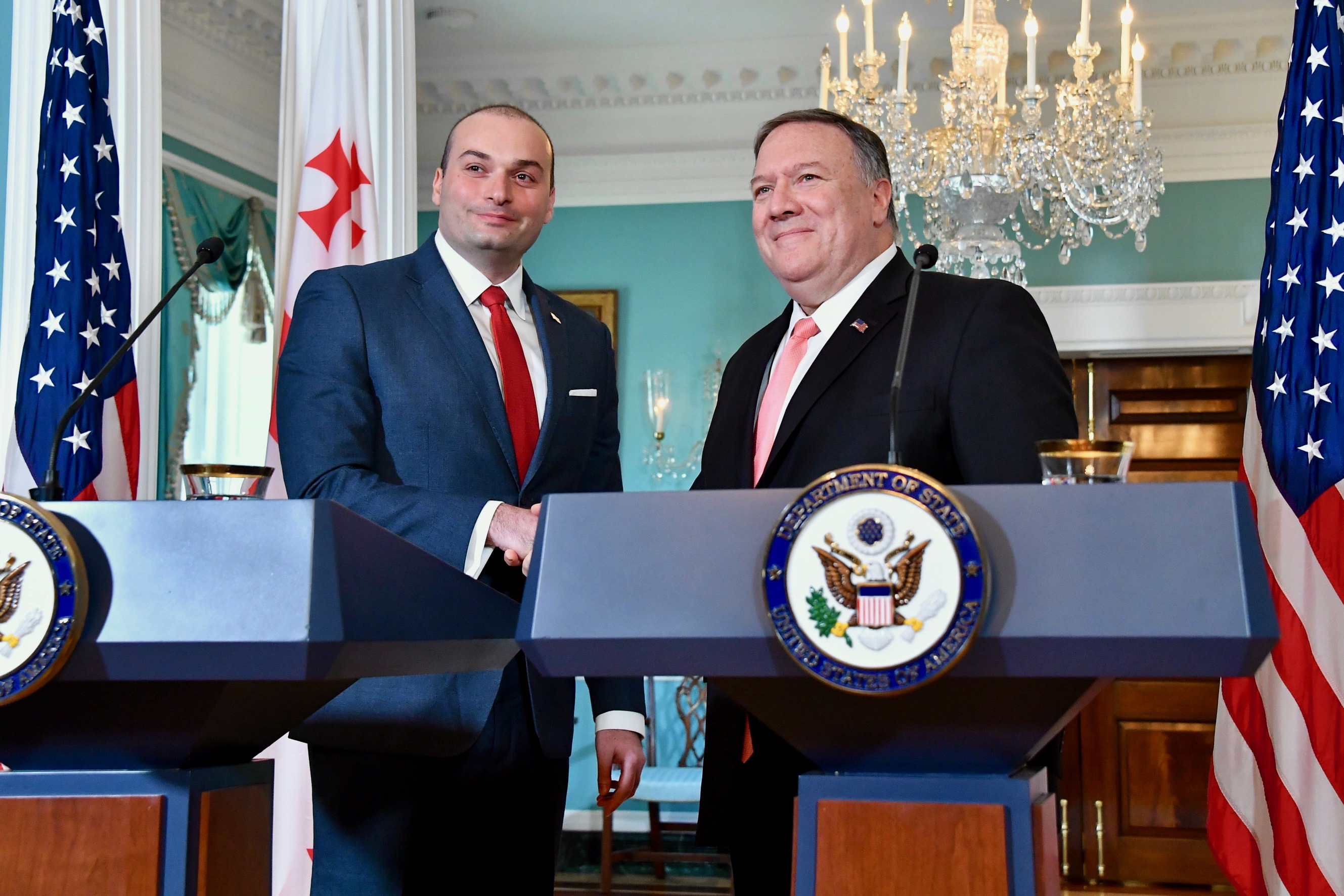
Bakhtadze speaks with U.S. Secretary of State Michael R. Pompeo at the Department of State in Washington, D.C., on June 11, 2019.

Bakhtadze's first foreign visit was to Brussels in July 2018, during which he reaffirmed in his meetings with European officials that Georgia remained committed to its European Union aspirations. In his address to the UN General Assembly in September 2018, Bakhtadze denounced the ongoing Russian military presence in breakaway Abkhazia and South Ossetia and spoke of Georgia's new peace initiatives offered to these entities.

During his tenure as prime minister, the government adopted Otkhozoria–Tatunashvili List to sanction Abkhazians and South Ossetians responsible for crimes committed against Georgians in separatist regions.

Bakhtadze unveiled various economic and political reform plans in 2018, such as those in education system and related to green economy, including the Clean Transport policy. He was involved in a campaign to support Salome Zourabichvili's candidacy to the presidency of Georgia and welcomed her election as a "victory for democracy" in November 2018.

On 2 September 2019 Bakhtadze resigned from his position as prime minister. In a letter he published on Facebook he stated that he "decided to resign because I believe I have fulfilled my mission at this point."

Political offices
Preceded by Dimitri Kumsishvili	Minister of Finance; 2017–2018	Succeeded by Nikoloz Gagua
Preceded by Giorgi Kvirikashvili	Prime Minister of Georgia; 2018–2019	Succeeded by Giorgi Gakharia
