= Ministry of Internally Displaced Persons from the Occupied Territories, Health, Labour and Social Affairs of Georgia =

Government ministry of Georgia

- საქართველოს ოკუპირებული ტერიტორიებიდან იძულებით გადაადგილებულ პირთა, შრომის, ჯანმრთელობისა და სოციალური დაცვის სამინისტრო
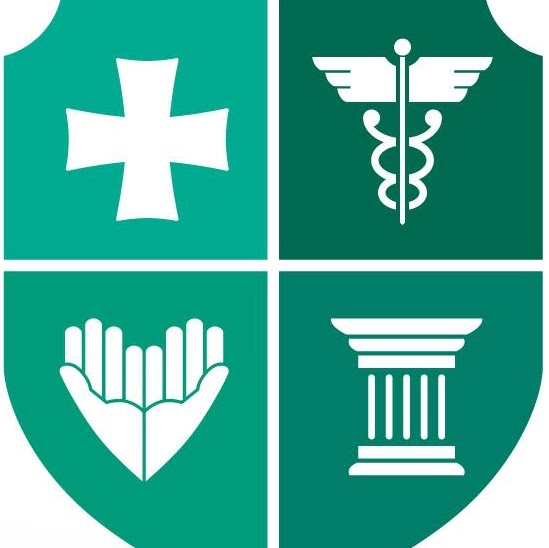
- Logo of the Ministry

Agency overview
- Jurisdiction: Government of Georgia
- Headquarters: A. Tsereteli Ave. N144, Tbilisi, Georgia 0119
- Annual budget: ₾6.86 billion (USD 2.58 billion) (2023)
- Agency executive: Mikheil Sarjveladze (11 March 2024–Disputed), Minister of Labour, Health and Social Affairs
- Website: www.moh.gov.ge

The Ministry of Internally Displaced Persons from the Occupied Territories, Health, Labour and Social Affairs of Georgia (Georgian: საქართველოს ოკუპირებული ტერიტორიებიდან იძულებით გადაადგილებულ პირითა, შრომის, ჯანმრთელობისა და სოციალური დაცვის სამინისტრო, sakartvelos okupirebuli teritoriebidan idzulebit gadaadgilebul pirta, shromis, janmrtelobisa da sotsialuri datsvis saministro) is a governmental agency within the Cabinet of Georgia in charge of regulating the healthcare system, labor and IDP issues, and social security system in Georgia. As of December 2021, the minister is Mikheil Sarjveladze.

== Structure ==
The ministry is headed by a minister appointed by the Prime Minister of Georgia. One first deputy minister and three deputies report directly to the minister. The ministry is made up from 16 departments and agencies. Main functions of the ministry are ensuring provision of good medical and public health services to the population; regulation of medical and pharmaceutical activity in the country; management of state pensions and social security; and protection of rights of children. The ministry has all the power to regulate all medical activities throughout the country through its chapters. The State United Social Insurance Fund and the Ministry of Finance of Georgia are the main sources of funding for the Ministry of Health, Labor and Social Affairs. In recent years, the ministry carried out an expansion of hospitals network by planned completion of 46 new hospitals by the end of 2011.

== Budget ==
The budget of the Ministry of Health, Labour and Social Affairs of Georgia in 2023 is GEL 6.86 billion (USD 2.58 billion), compared to GEL 620.8 million (USD 233.8 million) in 2022 (increased rate by GEL 65.2 million).

== See also ==
- Cabinet of Georgia
- National Center for Disease Control and Public Health (Georgia (country))
