= Ministry of Regional Development and Infrastructure of Georgia =

Government ministry of Georgia

- რეგიონული განვითარებისა და ინფრასტრუქტურის სამინისტრო
- Coat of Arms of Georgia

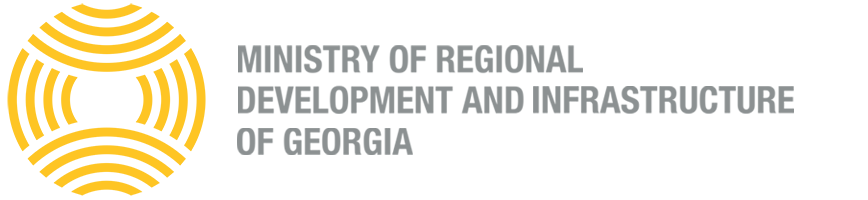

Agency overview
- Formed: February 2, 2009
- Jurisdiction: Government of Georgia
- Headquarters: 12 Al.Kazbegi Avenue, Tbilisi, Georgia 0134
- Annual budget: ₾955 million (2015)
- Agency executive: Kakaber guledani (04 April 2025–Disputed), State Minister of Georgia for Regional Development and Infrastructure
- Website: www.mrdi.gov.ge

The Ministry of Regional Development and Infrastructure of Georgia (Georgian: საქართველოს რეგიონული განვითარებისა და ინფრასტრუქტურის სამინისტრო, sakartvelos regionuli ganvitarebisa da inprastrukturis saministro) is a governmental agency within the Cabinet of Georgia in charge of regional and infrastructure development, regulation of activities in sector of Georgia. The ministry is currently headed by Irakli Karseladze.

== History ==
The ministry was established on the basis of previous government agency called State Ministry in Regional Management Issues on February 2, 2009 according to the Article 81 (2) of Georgian Constitution and law on the Structure, Powers and Order of Activity of the Government of Georgia. A separate state agency United Transport Administration and Department of Roads was abolished and its scope of activities transferred to the newly established ministry. The ministry is funded by the state budget. Davit Tkeshelashvili was the first minister assigned to take the office.

== Structure ==
The ministry oversees regional and infrastructure development throughout the country which includes modification and modernization of state road networks of international and domestic importance. It is also in charge of activities monitoring architectural and construction works in Georgia. The ministry issues proposals and drafts on modernization of Georgian infrastructure which is then reviewed by the Parliament of Georgia. The agency is made up of the Office of the Minister, Administrative Department, General Inspection Department, Department of Legal Support and Reforms, Department of Regional Development, Department of Public Relations, Mobilization and Military Drafting Coordination Office, Office of International Relations as well as its subdivisions (Automobile Roads Department of Georgia, Transport Administration and Main Architectural-Constructions Inspection.

== See also ==
- Cabinet of Georgia
