= Government of Georgia (country) =

National government of Georgia

- Georgian: საქართველოს მთავრობა
- Coat of arms

Overview
- Country: Georgia
- Leader: Prime Minister
- Appointed by: Parliament of Georgia
- Main organ: Cabinet
- Ministries: See members
- Responsible to: Parliament of Georgia
- Annual budget: GEL 24 billion ($9.04 billion) in 2023
- Headquarters: State Chancellery; 7, Pavle Ingorokva Str. Tbilisi, Georgia
- Website: gov.ge

The Government of Georgia (Georgian: საქართველოს მთავრობა, romanized: sakartvelos mtavroba) is the supreme body of executive power in Georgia that implements the domestic and foreign policies of the country. It consists of the prime minister—the head of the government—and ministers and is accountable and responsible to the Parliament of Georgia. The current powers and responsibilities of the government are governed by the amendments of the Constitution of Georgia passed in 2017 and 2018. From 14 May 1991 to 9 November 1996, the executive government of Georgia was referred to as the Cabinet of Ministers of the Republic of Georgia (საქართველოს რესპუბლიკის მინისტრთა კაბინეტი).

The incumbent government of Prime Minister Irakli Kobakhidze was sworn in on February 8, 2024.

== Constitutional framework ==
=== Composition ===
The Government of Georgia consists of a prime minister and ministers. The prime minister is the head of the government. In addition to ministers—who are in charge of ministries and manage a specific sector of public administration—one or several state ministers can be introduced in the government to oversee the government's tasks of particular importance. The government is constitutionally barred from holding any other office except in a political party, being engaged in entrepreneurial activities, or receiving remuneration for any other activity, except for academic and teaching. The government ensures its representation in the country's administrative subdivisions by designating a state representative or governor.

The head of the Government of Georgia is the prime minister, who appoints and dismisses ministers and assigns the duties of vice prime minister to one of the government members. The prime minister and the government are accountable to the Parliament of Georgia.

=== Vote of confidence ===
Upon the recognition of the full powers of the newly elected Parliament, the government relinquishes its authority to the Parliament and continues to perform its duties until a new prime minister is appointed. In case of the resignation of the prime minister or the termination of their authority otherwise, the government continues to act until a new prime minister is appointed. In either case, within two weeks, the Parliament must hold a vote of confidence in the government proposed by a candidate for the office of prime minister nominated by the political party that secured the best results in the parliamentary elections. A majority of the total number of the members of Parliament is required to pass a vote of confidence.

If the Parliament's vote of confidence is not passed within the established time frame, the president of Georgia dissolves the Parliament no earlier than two weeks and no later than three weeks after the respective time frame has expired, and calls extraordinary parliamentary elections. Within two days of a vote of confidence in the government, the president of Georgia appoints a prime minister. The prime minister then appoints within two days of their appointment. If the president does not appoint the prime minister within the established time frame, the prime minister is considered appointed.

=== Vote of no confidence ===
A vote of no confidence in the government can be held if the motion is proposed by more than one third of the total number of the members of Parliament. Together with a no confidence motion, the initiators nominate a candidate for prime minister, and the latter proposes a new government. If the Parliament does not pass a vote of no confidence in the government, the same members of Parliament have no right to propose a vote of no confidence within the next six months. A vote of confidence can also be initiated by the prime minister. An issue of confidence is put to vote no earlier than the 7th day and no later than the 14th day after it has been presented. If the government fails to achieve a vote of confidence from the Parliament, the president of Georgia dissolves the Parliament and calls an extraordinary parliamentary election.

== History ==
The supreme executive body of the first Georgian Republic was the Government of the Republic elected by the National Council of Georgia on 26 May 1918. According to the Constitution, adopted on 21 February 1921, the government consisted of the chairperson, elected by the Parliament for one year and for no more than two consecutive terms, and ministers, invited by the chairperson. Before the Constitution could be fully implemented, amid the Red Army invasion of Georgia, the country's government sailed in exile to France in March 1921 and continued to function as a government-in-exile for some time, while the country was taken over by the Bolshevik Revolutionary Committee (Revkom). Georgia was governed with no constitutional order until 2 March 1922, when the executive power was granted to the Council of People's Commissars of the Georgian SSR, which responsible before Soviet Georgia's legislature, known as the Supreme Council after 1937.

In the 1978 constitution, the Council of People's Commissars was renamed into the Council of Ministers. In the newly independent Georgia, the executive government was organized as the Cabinet of Ministers, chaired by the prime minister, who was appointed by the president of Georgia. After the coup of 1992 and a constitutional hiatus, the first modern constitution of Georgia, adopted on 24 August 1995, made no reference to the government as a separate body of power; all the executive power was exercised by the president through appointed ministers. The February 2004 constitutional amendment reestablished the position of prime minister and the Government of Georgia who were responsible before the president and the Parliament. In a series of amendments passed between 2010 and 2018, Georgia was transformed into a parliamentary democracy, whereby most of the executive powers of the president were granted to the prime minister and the government, while the president remained a ceremonial head of state and the commander-in-chief.

== Budget ==
The budget of the Government of Georgia in 2023 will be GEL 24 billion ($9.04 billion), compared to GEL 4.8 billion in 2022 (increased rate by GEL 19.2 billion).

== Current Cabinet ==
Ministry	Minister	Appointment date
Prime Minister	Irakli Kobakhidze	8 February 2024
Minister of Internal Affairs	Gela Geladze	28 May 2025
Minister of Infrastructure	Revaz Sokhadze	24 April 2025
Minister of Economy and Sustainable Development	Mariam Kvrivishvili	24 June 2025
Minister of Foreign Affairs	Maka Bochorishvili	1 December 2024
Minister of Culture and Youth	Tinatin Rukhadze	18 October 2024
Minister of Finance	Lasha Khutsishvili	1 April 2021
Minister of Defence	Irakli Chikovani	8 February 2024
Minister of Education and Science	Givi Mikanadze	30 June 2025
Minister of Environment Protection and Agriculture	Davit Songhulashvili	30 November 2024
Minister of Justice	Paata Salia	2 April 2025
Minister of IDPs from the Occupied Territories, Labor, Health and Social Protection	Mikheil Sarjveladze	11 March 2024
Minister of Sport	Shalva Gogoladze	1 January 2025
Minister of Regional Development	Kakhaber Guledani	4 April 2025
State Minister for Reconciliation and Civic Equality	Tea Akhvlediani	6 August 2020
