= 2007 Georgian demonstrations =

2007 protests in Georgia against the government of Mikheil Saakashvili

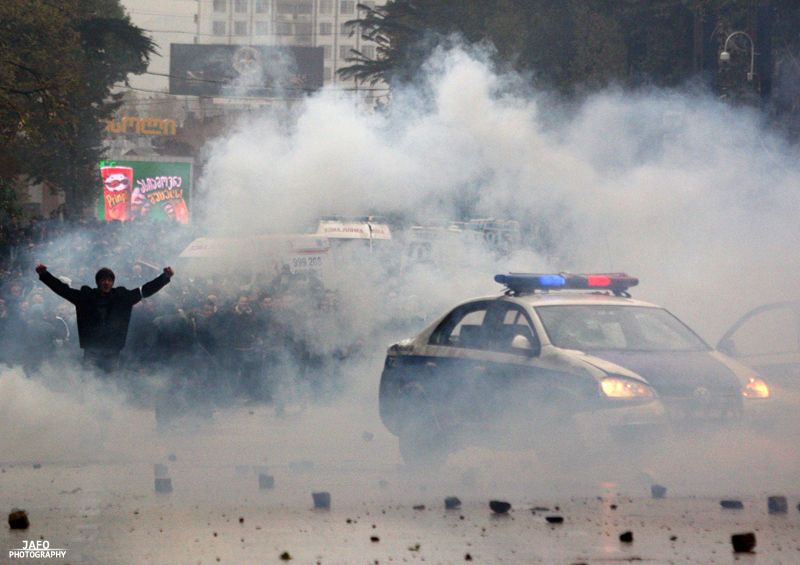
- A demonstration in Tbilisi
- Date: 28 September – 25 November 2007 (1 month and 4 weeks)
- Location: Georgia
- Caused by: Alleged political corruption Poverty; Human rights violations Handling of the 2006 Ortachala prison riots Sandro Girgvliani murder case
- Goals: Resignation of government Release of Irakli Okruashvili from prison Switch to a parliamentary system Establishment of a constitutional monarchy (some)
- Methods: Demonstrations, civil disobedience, picketing of parliament
- Result: Peaceful protests suppressed by force; Mikheil Saakashvili resigns; Early presidential election scheduled for 5 January 2008

Parties
(Georgia (country)) United National Council: National Forum; Republican Party; Conservative Party; Freedom; Georgia's Way; On Our Own; People's Party; Movement for United Georgia; Georgian Troupe; Georgian Labour Party	Government of Georgia: Ministry of Internal Affairs; Police of Georgia; Constitutional Security Department; Special Operative Department; National Security Council

Lead figures
Badri Patarkatsishvili; Irakli Okruashvili; Gubaz Sanikidze; Salome Zourabichvili; Konstantine Gamsakhurdia	Mikheil Saakashvili; Zurab Nogaideli; Vano Merabishvili

The 2007 Georgian demonstrations were a series of anti-government protests that took place across Georgia. The demonstrations peaked on 2 November 2007, when 40,000–50,000 people rallied in downtown Tbilisi. The protests were mostly against allegations of corruption by the government of President Mikheil Saakashvili and also triggered by the detention of Georgian politician Irakli Okruashvili on charges of extortion, money laundering and abuse of office during his tenure as defense minister of the country, being organized by the United National Council, a coalition of ten opposition parties, and financed by the media tycoon Badri Patarkatsishvili. Demonstrations occurred both in September and November 2007 and were initially largely peaceful. The protests went downhill by 6 November 2007, turning violent the next day when the police, using heavy-handed tactics, including tear gas and water cannons, unblocked Rustaveli Avenue, Tbilisi's main boulevard, dislodged the protesters from the territory adjoining to the House of Parliament, and prevented the demonstrators from resuming the protests. The government accused the Russian secret services of being involved in an attempted coup d'état and declared a nationwide state of emergency later that day, which lasted until 16 November 2007.

On 8 November 2007, Saakashvili announced a compromise solution to hold an early presidential election for 5 January 2008. He also proposed to hold a referendum in parallel to snap presidential elections about when to hold parliamentary polls – in spring as pushed for by the opposition parties, or in late 2008.

It is said to have been the worst political crisis in Georgia since the Rose Revolution in 2003, which brought Saakashvili's government to power in the first place.

== Background ==
Georgia saw a massive change of power in 2003, that saw Mikheil Saakashvili coming to power in 2004 after the resignation of Eduard Shevardnadze. Saakashvili, a U.S. trained lawyer and staunch advocate for closer integration with NATO and the European Union, instituted reforms that saw the nation's GDP triple and corruption drop since taking office. In 2006, the World Bank named Georgia as the top reformist country in the world. Despite the progress, a significant portion of Georgia's population still were living below the poverty line and it was one of the poorest countries in the CIS. Growing incomes were offset by rising inflation; radical economic reforms and a crackdown on the black market left thousands unemployed; and since the reforms, many Georgians had to pay tax and utility bills in full. Although the government of Saakashvili had declared war on corruption, its critics alleged corruption in Saakashvili's own team, including his entrepreneur uncle – Temur Alasania – and several ministers. The opponents said that the authorities were using selective application of the law to sideline political opponents, and accused Saakashvili of authoritarian rule. The government hae also come under the fire of criticism due to the use of heavy-handed police against the 2006 prison riots, as well as due to an underinvestigated high-profile murder case involving police officers.

Saakashvili also inherited the issues of the Russian-backed unrecognized breakaway republics of Abkhazia and South Ossetia, which seceded from Georgia in thearly 1990s. At the time of the demonstrations, they were de facto independent but de jure part of Georgia. Saakashvili had made it part of his agenda to reincorporate them through peaceful means. Others within Saakashvili's government however, such as the defence minister Irakli Okruashvili, had been pushing for a military solution.

Saaskashvili reassigned the portfolio of Okruashvili from defence to Minister of the Economy in November 2006. It was believed that the reassignment came due to Okruashvili's aggressive stance on the secessionist conflicts. Okruashvili subsequently resigned his post.

On 25 September 2007, he announced the formation of the new opposition Movement for United Georgia and unleashed criticism on President Saakashvili, accusing him of corruption, incompetency and human rights violations. He also raised new concerns around Zurab Zhvania's death, challenging the official investigation point of view and personally accused the Georgian president of planning the murder of businessman Badri Patarkatsishvili.

== Timeline ==
=== 28 September 2007 protests ===
Protests started on 28 September 2007. There was no major trouble reported at the rally, except for some minor scuffles between protesters and police when the protesters spilled out onto Rustaveli Avenue, blocking Tbilisi's main thoroughfare in front of the parliament. Demonstrators were demanding early elections, more accountability and honesty in politics. The demonstration, held merely a day after Okruashvili's arrest, attracted an estimated 10–15 thousand protesters, making it, at the time, the largest demonstration since Rose Revolution. Some noted the peculiar skill and unusual quickness in how these protests were organized.

The rally was organized by an alliance of major opposition parties with the exception of the New Rights Party (NRP) which didn't participate in manifestation stating that it was "not the way from one temple to another, it is substitute of one leader with another."

==== Okruashvili's comments ====
Previously, former Georgian Minister of Defense and long-time critic of Moscow's policy towards Georgia Irakly Okruashvili has lashed out at his former associate President Mikheil Saakashvili. Okruashvili had been sacked by the president, in November 2006, from his post of Defense Minister allegedly under pressure from the West in September 2006.

At the presentation of his party For United Georgia, he accused Saakashvili of corruption, lobbying the interests of his own family, weakness towards separatists in Abkhazia and South Ossetia. Okruashvili also claimed that the Georgian government had intentionally obscured the true reasons behind the death of former prime minister Zurab Zhvania. Zhvania had died while prime minister in February 2005. Okruashvili said that Zhvania's corpse had been taken to the apartment where he was found dead.

Okruashvili retracted his statements and admitted to the charges raised against him on 8 October 2007 on television, but he later said he made the statements due to being "psychologically pressured".

Okruashvili left Georgia around 1 November 2007. He subsequently said he was forced into exile; the government said he left to seek medical treatment. The following April he was granted political asylum by the government of France. In September 2008, a French court rejected Georgia's extradition request. Okruashvili has been described as "a likely candidate to replace Saakashvili, if and when Georgian public opinion turns against the president."

==== Government's response ====
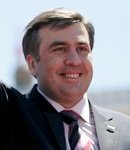
Mikhail Saakashvili, Georgia's president

Okruashvili's political comeback and his arrest coincided with Saakashvili's visit to New York City where he addressed the U.N. General Assembly and heavily criticized Russia's involvement in Georgia's breakaway territories. Meanwhile, Giga Bokeria, an influential member of the Parliament of Georgia from the ruling United National Movement party, said by voicing stunning, but groundless accusations Okruashvili wanted "to create some kind of immunity and untouchable status." On 29 September, President Saakashvili headed to Upper Abkhazia where he attended opening of a new road linking Georgian-controlled areas in breakaway Abkhazia with Georgia proper. He made his first remarks on Okruashvili's accusations:

I want to tell you that personally for me it is very difficult what Okruashvili has done. I am accustomed to any accusations leveled against me and against my relatives. But this person [Okruashvili] – unlike those persons, who just believed in or made allegations – knows precisely that it is a lie.

=== 2 November 2007 protests ===
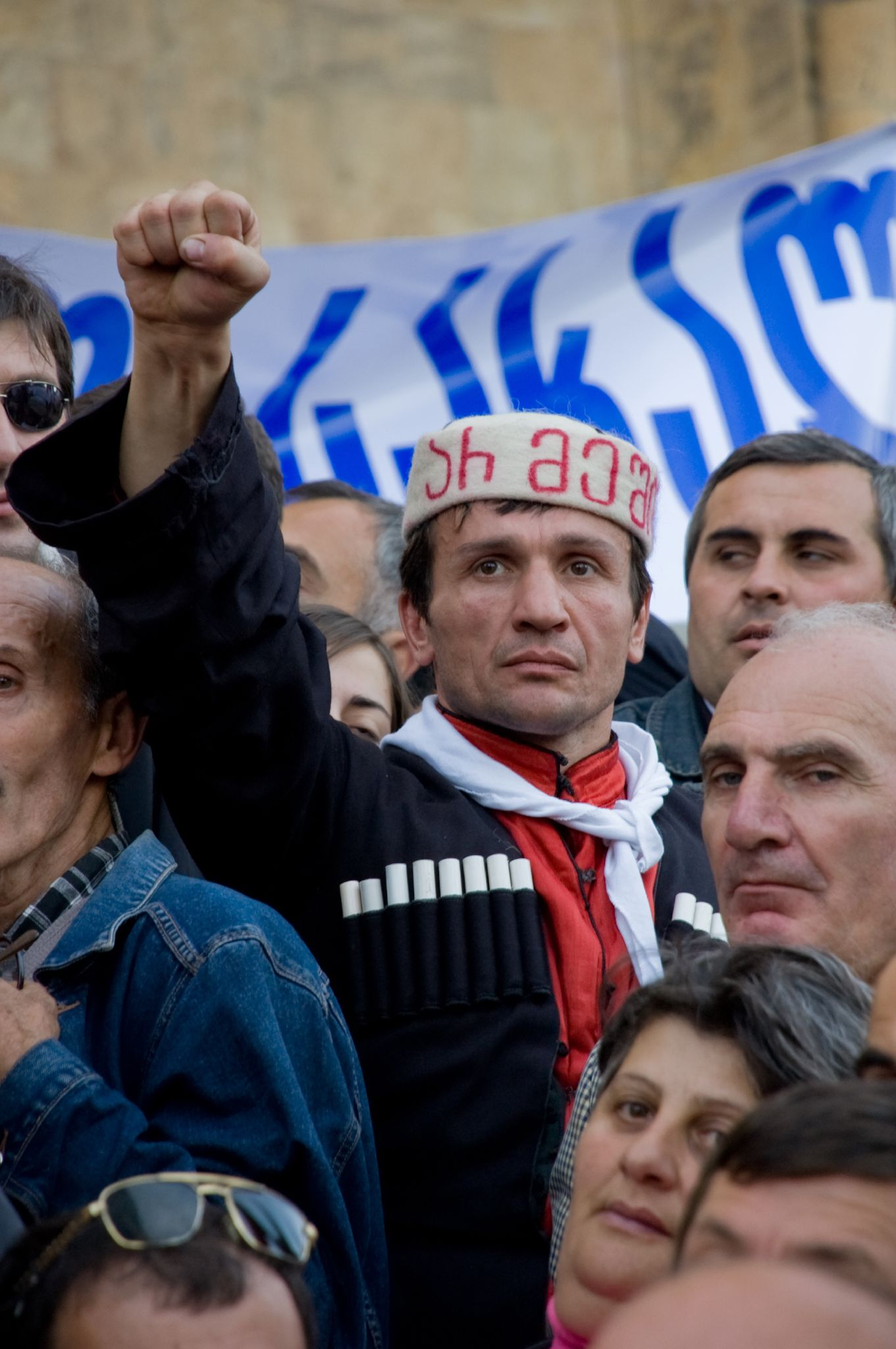
Opposition protests in Tbilisi on 2 November 2007. The inscription says "I am not afraid" in Georgian.

On 2 November 2007, tens of thousands of Georgians protested outside the parliament in the capital, Tbilisi, urging President Mikhail Saakashvili to step down. The crowd also called for early parliamentary elections. They accused Saakashvili of heading a corrupt, authoritarian government and wanted him to be ousted democratically.

The protests continued in the following days; a televised statement from Okruashvili was seen as a boost in support for the opposition.

Twenty-three law enforcement officers were injured and 21 people were arrested during the riots.

TV footage showed some protesters throwing stones at riot policemen. They were dispersed by police a second time.

Two pro-opposition independent TV stations have gone off the air after Badri Patarkatsishvili declared that "Nobody should doubt that all my efforts, my financial resources including the last tetri will be applied for freeing Georgia from Fascist regime": Imedi TV (that is co-owned by the media tycoon Badri Patarkatsishvili who sponsored the United National Council recently set up by the ten opposition parties and has pledged to finance the rallies until the government is removed) and Kavkasia, located in the same building as Imedi TV. Police officers in masks and assault rifles were seen sealing off the Imedi office. Shortly afterwards, Mikheil Saakashvili declared a state of emergency Georgia-wide to last for 15 days. As a result, news programs at all the private television stations will be shut down for 15 days. The publicly funded Georgian Public Broadcaster (GPB) remained the only station allowed to provide news coverage.

On 8 November, a "small group of students" gathered at Batumi State University to rally against what they saw as the "police violence" that had occurred the previous day. According to eyewitnesses interviewed by Human Rights Watch, "police attacked the group without warning, chasing and beating protesters trying to flee." Holly Cartner, Executive Director [of] Europe and Central Asia Division at Human Rights Watch condemned what she described as "police attacks on peaceful protesters".

Soon, Georgia's opposition announced the suspension of anti-government protests in Tbilisi. Most of the opposition parties hailed President Saakashvili's decision as the first step to end the political standoff, and agreed to the negotiations with Nino Burjanadze, the parliamentary chairperson.

By 9 November 2007, riot police and troops had been withdrawn from the main sites of 7 November unrest. On the same day, Ilia II, Catholicos-Patriarch of the Georgian Orthodox Church met separately with Nino Burjanadze and opposition leaders and said that he was ready to mediate between the opposition and the authorities.

==== Government's response ====
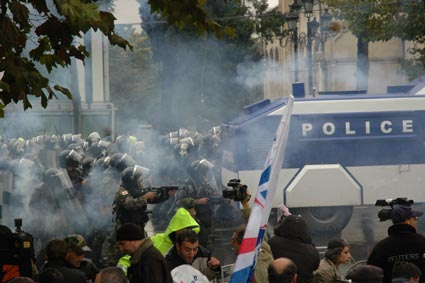
Protesters clash with riot police on 7 November 2007.

Saakashvili commented the clashes by saying "We have been hearing for recent months that turmoil was expected in Georgia by autumn. We have been receiving this information from our intelligence" and that "alternative government has already been set up in Moscow".

Prime Minister Zurab Nogaideli said a coup attempt was made.

On 7 November, Georgia's Interior Ministry released taped audio and video material purporting to show some opposition leaders – Levan Berdzenishvili of the Republican Party, Giorgi Khaindrava of opposition group Equality Institute, Konstantine Gamsakhurdia, the leader of the Freedom Movement and Shalva Natelashvili, the leader of Labor Party – cooperating with the Russian counter-intelligence service during a meeting with three Russian diplomats.

Gigi Ugulava, Tbilisi's mayor, defended the action by police, saying: "I was listening to one of the opposition leaders who was saying proudly they planned to pitch tents and set up a tent town in Tbilisi. What we did is stop this because it is the will of the people not to have a tent town in Tbilisi."

==== Criticism of government actions ====
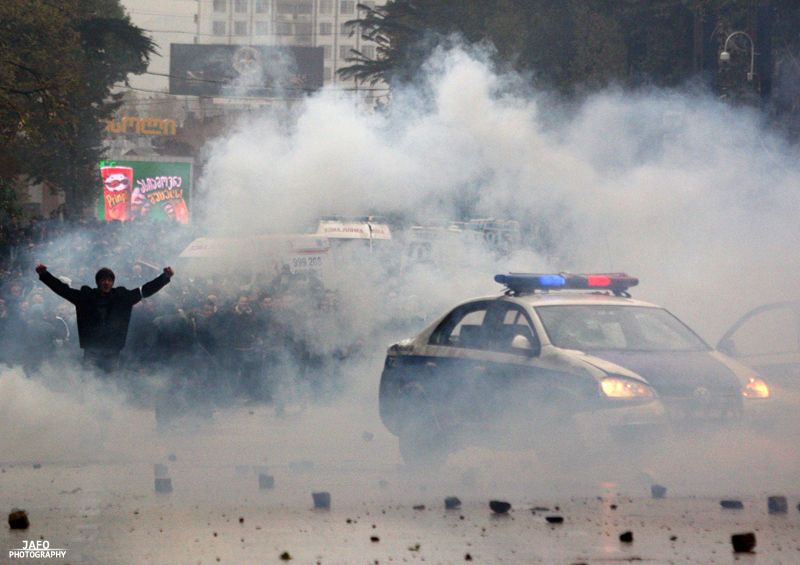
Clashes in Tbilisi on 7 November 2007.

The opposition leaders, NGOs and the public defender of Georgia have harshly criticised the government actions. The police was accused of excessiveness, and it was alleged that groups of organized civilians were also engaged in the crackdown on the protesters. Illegal arrests, beatings and intimidations were reported. Concerns have been expressed about widespread practice of tapping private telephone conversations. The government has been accused of media control.

In December 2008, Sozar Subari, Public Defender (Ombudsman) of Georgia, claimed he had evidence that then Georgia's Interior Minister Vano Merabishvili had ordered police to beat protesters, "mainly in the kidneys and the stomach." In his testimony before Georgian Parliament, Subari claimed that he possessed evidence that Defense Minister Davit Kezerashvili, Justice Minister Zurab Adeishvili and Davit Akhalaia (who had no official office then) had had a secret meeting at the office of Interior Ministry on 4 November 2007 where they had decided on the course of action for handling the demonstrations.

=== 25 November 2007 protests ===
On 25 November 2007, thousands of protesters staged a three-hour peaceful demonstration demanding the re-opening of Imedi TV and radio stations. The protest, organized by a nine party opposition coalition, gathered in an area called the Rike in Tbilisi and then moved to the front of the Parliament.

== International reaction ==
United States – The United States welcomed the Georgian government's decision to hold early presidential elections, while urging to end the state of emergency and restore all media broadcasts. On 13 November 2007, Matthew Bryza, Deputy Assistant Secretary of State for European Affairs and the top U.S. envoy to the Caucasus, told reporters that he would be very surprised if there had been a real threat from Russia to destabilize Georgia.

Russia – The Russian Foreign Ministry rejected Saakashvili's accusations of backing the opposition rally calling it an "irresponsible provocation" designed by Georgian authorities to distract attention from domestic problems and blame them on a foreign scapegoat. It later issued a statement heavily criticizing the Georgian government for police lawlessness, arrests of opposition leaders and human rights activists, ban on activities of the independent media and beating of foreign journalists.

Sweden – Swedish Foreign minister Carl Bildt said that 7 November was a "very dark day for Georgia", but praised the decision to hold early presidential elections, adding that all parties now have to "return to the democratic path". "This is also a way to address the simplistic propaganda that is currently blazoned abroad by the big neighbor in the north (Russia)" /.../ "and to secure long-term stability in the country." Carl Bildt, who met with President Saakashvili in Tbilisi on 2 November, has repeatedly said that: "To support and help the young democracies (in Eastern Europe) /.../ is something we (Europe) must do."

United Nations – Louise Arbour, the UN High Commissioner for Human Rights, rebuked Georgia for its "disproportionate use of force" against protesters and said it must uphold fundamental rights even under a state of emergency. In a statement, she also expressed support for Georgia's public defender, or human rights ombudsman, and voiced concern at the silencing of independent television stations in the former Soviet republic.

NATO – Secretary General Jaap de Hoop Scheffer in a statement on 8 November 2007 said that "The imposition of Emergency Rule, and the closure of media outlets in Georgia, a Partner with which the Alliance has an Intensified Dialogue, are of particular concern and not in line with Euro-Atlantic values"

European Union – The EU foreign policy chief, Javier Solana, urged restraint from both sides, saying "political differences should be resolved within the democratic institutions".

Human Rights Watch – On 20 December 2007, Human Rights Watch released a 102-page report, named Crossing the Line: Georgia's Violent Dispersal of Protestors and Raid on Imedi Television, criticising what it saw as the Government's "usage of excessive force" on protesters the police's raide on Imedi.

== Aftermath ==
=== Crisis recedes ===
On 8 November 2007, Saakashvili announced he was planning snap presidential elections for 5 January 2008. He also proposed to hold a simultaneous plebiscite about when to hold parliamentary polls – in spring as pushed for by the opposition parties, or in late 2008. He also called for dialogue with the opposition parties which, he said, did not cooperate with the Russian intelligence, and promised to end the state of emergency within a few days.

The Georgian authorities charged Patarkatsishvili, who had earlier left for London, with plotting a coup. He died on 12 February 2008, in London.

On 9 November 2007, the Parliament of Georgia, in a complete absence of opposition lawmakers, backed the presidential decree imposing state of emergency and restrictions on media on the entire territory of Georgia to be in force until late 22 November.

On 10 November 2007, the talks regarding the election code resumed between the ruling and opposition parties.

The nationwide state of emergency was lifted at 7 pm local time on 16 November 2007, in accordance to the parliament's decree passed two days earlier. All media sources resumed broadcasting with the exception of Imedi TV which returned on air on 12 December.

=== Economic impact ===
Robert Christiansen, the head of the IMF's Georgia mission, indicated that the turmoil and pre-election uncertainty has dented Georgia's image with investors, adding that recovery was possible. He added that "recent political developments add considerable uncertainty to the projected volume of inflows for the remainder of this year and 2008".

According to prime minister Lado Gurgenidze, during the November turmoils Georgian economy lost nearly half a billion dollars of potential investments.

== See also ==
- 2008 Georgia–Russia crisis
- 2009 Georgian demonstrations
- 2011 Georgian protests
- 2012 Georgian protests
- Badri Patarkatsishvili
- Human Rights in Georgia
- Movement for United Georgia
