= GCF =

GCF may refer to:

- Antillean Creole
- Gauche Communiste de France, a French political party
- Georgian Co-Investment Fund
- Gender critical feminist
- Global Certification Forum
- Global Climate Forum
- Good Clean Fun (band), an American hardcore punk band
- Google Chrome Frame
- Governors' Climate and Forests Task Force, an international environmental agreement
- Grand Council of Fascism, Italy's ruling body from 1928 to 1945
- Greatest common factor
- Green Climate Fund
- Guam Cycling Federation
- Gun Carriage Factory Jabalpur, India

== See also ==
- Good Clean Fun (disambiguation)
