= Prosecutor's Office of Georgia =

Prosecutor's Office of Georgia (Georgian: საქართველოს პროკურატურა, romanized: sakartvelos p'rok'urat'ura) is a government institution in Georgia, a legal party responsible for official prosecution in courts.

As defined by the Constitution of Georgia, amended in 2017 and 2018, the Prosecutor's Office is led by the Prosecutor General (გენერალური პროკურორი), who is elected by the Parliament of Georgia for a term of 6 years. The Prosecutor General's candidacy is nominated by the Prosecutors' Council (საპროკურორო საბჭო), an independent body directly accountable to the Parliament and composed of the Minister of Justice, attorneys, judges, and members of the Parliament as defined by the law. The Council is to ensure the independence, transparency, and efficiency of the Prosecutor's Office.

== List of heads of Prosecutor's Office of Georgia ==
=== Prosecutor General of Georgia ===
- Vazha Abakelia, 1991-1992
- Vakhtang Razmade, 1992
- Tedo Ninidze, 1992–1993
- Jamlet Babilashvili, 1993–2001
- Gia Meparishvili, 1993–2001
- Nugzar Gabrichidze, 30 November 2001 – 14 January 2004
- Irakli Okruashvili, 14 January 2004 – 7 June 2004
- Zurab Adeishvili, 10 June 2004 – 26 April 2007
- Zurab Bibilashvili, 26 April 2007 – 31 January 2008
- Eka Tkeshelashvili, 31 January 2008 – 11 November 2008
- Shalva Tadumadze, 16 July 2018 – 12 December 2019
- Vacant, 12 December 2019 – 18 February 2020
- Irakli Shotadze, 18 February 2020 – present

=== Chief Prosecutor of Georgia ===
- Mamuka Gvaramia, 11 November 2008 – 28 September 2009
- Murtaz Zodelava, 28 September 2009 – 8 October 2012
- Archil Kbilashvili, 8 October 2012 – 7 November 2013
- Otar Partskhaladze, 7 November 2013 – 30 December 2013
- Irakli Shotadze, acting, 30 December 2013 – 21 January 2014
- Giorgi Badashvili, 21 January 2014 – 19 November 2015
- Irakli Shotadze, 19 November 2015 – 31 May 2018
- Mamuka Vasadze, acting, 31 May 2018 – 16 July 2018
- Shalva Tadumadze, since 16 July 2018
