= G3 Good Governance Group in Georgia Project =

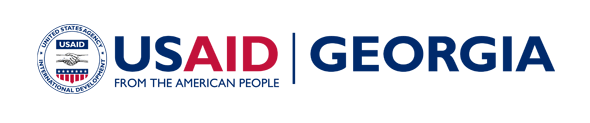
G3 Good Governance Group in Georgia Project logo

The Good Governance Group in Georgia (G3) project addresses the diverse challenges facing governance at the national and local levels. The project was established in 2011 and aims to improve governance and transparency at the federal level promoting more responsive, expert, and engaged neighbouring governments.

The $16 million funded three-year project was launched by U.S. Ambassador John Bass and Georgia’s Minister of Justice Zurab Adeishvili. The project also aims to develop the current push towards e-governance by improving web-based interactive communication between the general public and civil society, enabling them to express their comments, proposals and ideas on government improvements.

In addition to these proposed actions, G3 will also intend to work with Georgia’s Chamber of Control to offer transparency of public spending. G3, which will run till February 2014, is funded by Management Systems International (MSI) which is a subsidiary of Coffey International and the U.S. Agency for International Development (USAID).
