= Okruashvili =

Okruashvili (Georgian: ოქრუაშვილი) is a Georgian surname. Notable people with the surname include:

- Adam Okruashvili (born 1989), Georgian judoka
- Irakli Okruashvili (born 1973), Georgian politician
