= George Bachiashvili =

Georgian businessman

Giorgi Bachiashvili
- Born: გიორგი ბაჩიაშვილი 1985 (age 39–40); Moscow, Russian SFSR, Soviet Union
- Other names: George Bachiashvili
- Occupations: Entrepreneur; venture capitalist; private-equity executive
- Years active: 2005–present
- Known for: Founder & former CEO of the Georgian Co-Investment Fund; founder & CEO of Mission Gate; high-profile legal dispute with Bidzina Ivanishvili

George (or Giorgi) Bachiashvili, born in 1985, is a Georgian businessman and former head of the Georgian Co-Investment Fund (GCF). He was a close associate of billionaire and former Prime Minister of Georgia, Bidzina Ivanishvili, before a public falling out, and legal case. As of May 2025, he was jailed in Georgia. Some commentators consider his imprisonment to be personally and politically motivated.

== Biography ==
Bachiashvili earned a Bachelor of Business Administration from Caucasus University in 2005, and later an MBA (2009-2010) from INSEAD in Paris. He began his business career at the Bank of Georgia (2005-2007), and then working in various jobs, including the Dhabi Group in Tbilisi, and then Booz Company and Unicor in Moscow (2010-2012). In November 2012, after Ivanishvili became Prime Minister, Bachiashvili was appointed Deputy Executive Director of the Partnership Fund, a state-owned investment fund. In 2013, he was selected by Ivanishvili to head the newly established Georgian Co-Investment Fund, which was planned to be a $6 billion private equity fund. He served as the fund's Chief Executive Officer until 2019, after which he became the chairman of its advisory board. After 2019, he focused on Mission Gate, his own venture capital fund.

== Legal issues, escape, rendition ==
In 2023, legal issues for Bachiashvili emerged. Bidzina Ivanishvili accused him of appropriating a significant amount of cryptocurrency, specifically 8,986 bitcoins, which were valued at approximately $43 million at the time of the alleged misappropriation in 2017. Prosecutors claimed that instead of transferring the full profit from an investment to Ivanishvili, Bachiashvili only returned a small fraction of the earnings. He faced charges under Article 182 of the Georgian Criminal Code for the unlawful appropriation of another's property and for money laundering.

In May 2024 his lawyer Robert Amsterdam, published a detailed white paper, describing the relationship and the falling out with BI, which drew wide international attention. Amsterdam argued that the state involvement in what was a civil dispute was a clear indication of state capture. Bachiashvili's interviews on his collaboration with Bidzina Ivanishvili with the public drew significant public interest.

In early March 2025, citing political persecution and threats to his safety, Bachiashvili fled Georgia, reportedly crossing into Armenia. On March 10, 2025, the Tbilisi City Court sentenced him in absentia to 11 years in prison. Subsequently, in May 2025, the State Security Service of Georgia announced his arrest near the country's border.

Following his detention, Bachiashvili alleged that he had been abducted abroad and illegally brought back to Georgia, in a rendition in which he says the politician and head of the State Security Service Anri Okhanashvili was personally involved in. He claimed his prosecution was politically motivated and orchestrated by Ivanishvili. His lawyer have expressed concerns about the risk of torture in detention. Bachiashvili holds dual citizenship of Georgia and the Russian Federation. As of June 2025, he remains imprisoned in Georgia.

== Attack in Prison, July 2025 ==
As Bachiashvili reported, he was attacked on 11 July, while in his prison cell. As Bachiashvili described it, he had previously been told by the prison director that there were "crazy" people in prison, and had suggested him to submit to the demands made by Bidzina Ivanishvili. According to Bachiashvili, the attack was seen but not stopped by prison guards. Bachiashvili sustained several injuries and received medical treatment.

His lawyer had earlier warned about the risk of torture in prison. His lawyer also described the incident as “pure torture, carried out under state supervision. The Georgian authorities are complicit and we are reporting this grave incident to international authorities.”
