= Gia Kavtaradze =

Georgian politician

Minister of Justice of Georgia
- In office December 2005 – 2007
- Preceded by: Konstantin Kemularia
- Succeeded by: Eka Tkeshelashvili

Personal details
- Born: 1970 (age 55–56) Tbilisi, Georgia SSR, Soviet Union

Gia Kavtaradze (Georgian: გია ქავთარაძე; born 1970, in Tbilisi, Georgia) is the member of the Cabinet of Georgia and the Minister of Justice in the nation of Georgia. A lawyer by training, he has practiced law in Georgia, and worked in a series of NGO and Government jobs. He fluently speaks Russian, English and Georgian.

== Biography ==
Kavtaradze was born in Tbilisi in 1970. He studied international law and international relations at Tbilisi State University, followed by a Masters in Law at Indiana University in the USA. From 1994 to 1998 he worked for a series of Non Governmental Organization in Tbilisi, including the Red Cross, UNICEF, and UNDP. From 1998 to 2002 he worked in the Council of Justice, apart from an eight-month period as director of the Justice Training Center, a not-for-profit institution. From 2002 to 2005 he left government, becoming managing partner of the law firm Kavtaradze & Partners.

Kavtaradze returned to politics in 2005, becoming chair of the Central Election Commission, and was appointed Minister of Justice in December 2005.

== See also ==
- Politics of Georgia

== Notes and External Links ==
- Official biography
- Biography from Transparency International
