= Gocha Lordkipanidze =

Georgian legal scholar and civil servant

- გოჩა ლორთქიფანიძე
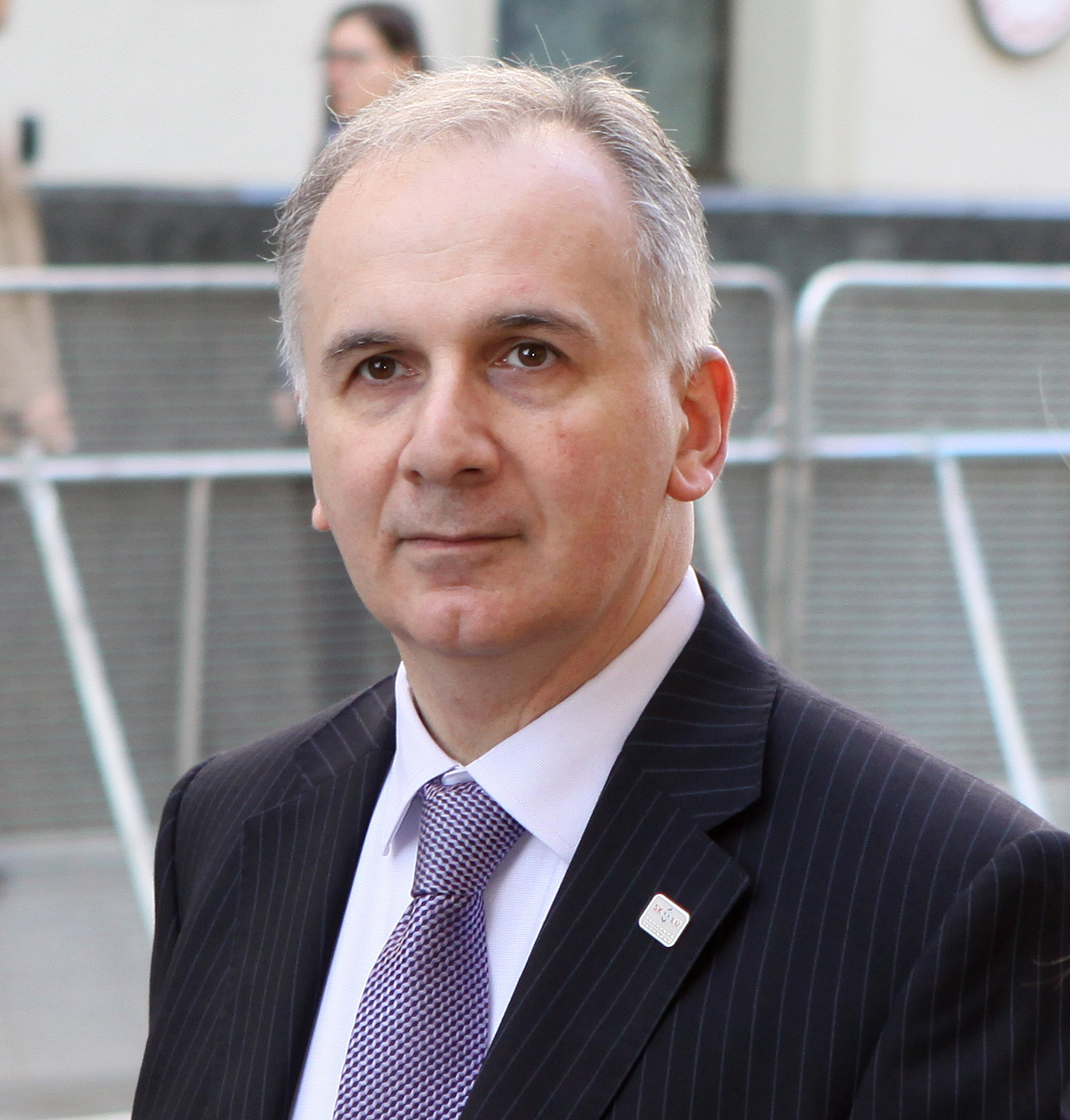
- Gocha Lordkipanidze in 2016

Judge of the International Criminal Court
- Incumbent
- Assumed office 11 March 2021
- Nominated by: Georgia
- Appointed by: Assembly of States Parties

Minister of Justice of Georgia
- In office 20 December 2020 – 31 March 2021
- Preceded by: Tea Tsulukiani
- Succeeded by: Rati Bregadze

Personal details
- Born: 3 February 1964 (age 62) Poti, Georgia, Soviet Union

Gocha Lordkipanidze (Georgian: გოჩა ლორთქიფანიძე; born 3 February 1964) is a Georgian lawyer, legal scholar and civil servant, who has been a judge of the International Criminal Court since 2021. He served as a deputy minister in the Ministry of Justice of Georgia from 2012 to 2020, and then as the Minister of Justice from 2020 to 2021.

== Biography ==
Lordkipanidze was born on 3 February 1964. From 1985 to 1991, he studied law at the Tbilisi State University, graduating with an undergraduate degree and qualified as a lawyer.

Lordkipanidze worked as legal counsel in the Ministry of Foreign Affairs of Georgia from 1992 to 1999. He undertook further study and graduated from the University of Essex with a Master of Laws (LLM) degree in international human rights law in 1995. He joined the Permanent Mission of Georgia to United Nations in 1999, and rose from a counsellor to acting deputy permanent representative. He also studied at Harvard Law School, graduating with a further LLM in international legal studies in 2004. From 2005 to 2009, he was adviser to the prime minister of Georgia in international law and foreign affairs. From 2009 to 2013, he was an adjunct professor at School of International and Public Affairs, Columbia University. In 2012, he was appointed deputy minister of justice in the Ministry of Justice of Georgia. He then served as Minister of Justice from 2020 to 2021.

== ICC Judgeship ==
In December 2020, he was one of six new judges elected to the International Criminal Court (ICC). He was sworn in as an ICC judge on 10 March 2021. He is an Appeals judge of the court.

== U.S. Sanctions ==
Since December 18, 2025, judge Lordkipanidze has been under U.S. sanctions due to his role as an appeals judge in confirming arrest warrants brought by prosecutor Karim Khan against Israeli Prime Minister Benjamin Netanyahu and former Defense Minister Yoav Gallant.
