= Eka Tkeshelashvili =

Georgian jurist and politician

- ეკა ტყეშელაშვილი
- Tkeshelashvili in 2026 at Politics and Prose bookstore

State Minister for Reintegration
- In office 20 November 2010 – 25 October 2012
- President: Mikheil Saakashvili
- Preceded by: Temur Iakobashvili
- Succeeded by: Paata Zakareishvili

Deputy Prime Minister of Georgia
- In office 20 November 2010 – 25 October 2012
- President: Mikheil Saakashvili
- Preceded by: David Tkeshelashvili
- Succeeded by: Kakha Kaladze

Secretary of the National Security Council
- In office 6 December 2008 – 20 November 2010
- President: Mikheil Saakashvili
- Preceded by: Alexander Lomaia
- Succeeded by: Giga Bokeria

Minister of Foreign Affairs
- In office 5 May 2008 – 6 December 2008
- President: Mikheil Saakashvili
- Preceded by: David Bakradze
- Succeeded by: Grigol Vashadze

Prosecutor General
- In office 1 February 2008 – 5 May 2008
- Preceded by: Zurab Bibliashvili
- Succeeded by: Mamuka Gvaramia

Minister of Justice of Georgia
- In office 1 August 2007 – 31 January 2008
- President: Mikheil Saakashvili
- Prime Minister: Zurab Nogaideli; Giorgi Baramidze (acting); Vladimer Gurgenidze
- Preceded by: Gia Kavtaradze
- Succeeded by: Nika Gvaramia

Deputy Minister of Internal Affairs
- In office 1 September 2005 – 1 May 2006

Deputy Minister of Justice
- In office 1 February 2004 – 1 September 2005

Personal details
- Born: 23 May 1977 (age 49) Tbilisi, Georgian SSR, Soviet Union (now Georgia)
- Children: 2
- Education: Tbilisi State University

Ekaterine "Eka" Tkeshelashvili (Georgian: ეკატერინე "ეკა" ტყეშელაშვილი; born 23 May 1977) is a Georgian jurist and politician, formerly serving as Minister of Justice, Minister of Foreign Affairs, Secretary of the National Security Council, and Deputy Prime Minister and State Minister for Reintegration of Georgia under President Mikheil Saakashvili.

== Biography ==
Tkeshelashvili was born on 23 May 1977 in Tbilisi, the capital of what was then Georgian SSR (now Georgia). She graduated from the Faculty of International Law and International Relations at Tbilisi State University in 1999 and worked as a lawyer for the International Committee of the Red Cross, Georgia, and then for IRIS Georgia, a Tbilisi office of the University of Maryland’s Center for Institutional Reform and the Informal Sector. From 9 October 1997 until 10 September 1999 she was the Chief Specialist Centre for Foreign Policy Research and Analysis in the Ministry of Foreign Affairs of Georgia. From 1 June to 1 November 2001 Tkeshelashvili was a lawyer at Lawyers' Committee of Human Rights in New York City, from December 2002 until May 2003, interned at the International Criminal Tribunal for the former Yugoslavia in the Hague, Netherlands. She is a Senior Network Member at the European Leadership Network (ELN).

== Political career ==
Tkeshelashvili was appointed to her first government post as Deputy Minister of Justice of Georgia on February 1, 2004. She was then appointed Deputy Minister of Interior on 1 September 2005 and then became a Chairperson of the Tbilisi Court of Appeals from May 1, 2006 to August 1, 2007.

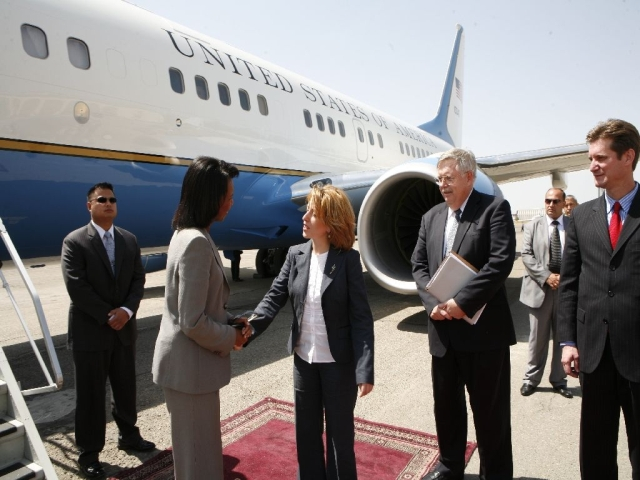
Eka Tkeshelashvili (center) greeting Condoleezza Rice in Georgia, August 2008.

She served as Minister of Justice of Georgia from August 2007 to January 2008, and as Prosecutor General of Georgia from January to May 2008. On 5 May 2008 she was appointed Minister of Foreign Affairs, a post she held until 5 December 2008. Her appointment coincided with Georgia's increasingly tense relations with its northern neighbor Russia over the breakaway regions of Abkhazia and South Ossetia, and Georgia's aspiration to join NATO. During her tenure in this position, she vowed to pursue active diplomacy to find a peaceful solution to all existing problems. Tkeshelashvili was replaced as Minister of Foreign Affairs by Grigol Vashadze on 5 December 2008 in a cabinet shuffle. Later in December, she was appointed to head the National Security Council. From 2010 to 2012, she was State Minister for Reintegration.

From 2017 Tkeshelashvili is Head of EU Anti-Corruption Initiative in Ukraine. She also teaches at Civil and Political School in Kyiv, and in the Black Sea University in Tbilisi.

== Personal life ==
Tkeshelashvili is married and has two children. In addition to her native Georgian, she speaks English, Russian, and French.
