= Vazha Abakelia =

Georgian lawyer and politician

- ვაჟა აბაკელია

1st Prosecutor General of Georgia
- In office 25 November 1991 – 5 January 1992
- President: Zviad Gamsakhurdia
- Prime Minister: Besarion Gugushvili
- Succeeded by: Vakhtang Razmadze

First Deputy Chairman of the Supreme Court of Georgia
- In office 28 December 1991 – 25 November 1991
- President: Zviad Gamsakhurdia
- Succeeded by: Orde Bebia

Member of the Supreme Council of Georgia
- In office 14 November 1990 – 27 January 1991
- Succeeded by: Arkadi Markozia
- Constituency: 65th District

Personal details
- Born: October 26, 1948 Martvili, Georgian SSR
- Died: July 12, 2019 Tbilisi, Georgia
- Resting place: Saburtalo Cemetery
- Party: Communist Party (1971–1991); United National Council (2008)
- Education: Tbilisi State University

Vazha Abakelia (Georgian: ვაჟა აბაკელია; 26 October 1948 – 12 July 2019) was a Georgian jurist, judge, prosecutor, academic, and politician who served as the first Prosecutor General of Georgia following the country's restoration of independence in 1991. He held senior judicial and legislative positions during the late Soviet and early post-Soviet periods, including as a Supreme Court judge and member of the Supreme Council, and played a prominent role during the 1991-92 overthrow of President Zviad Gamsakhurdia. After his removal from office during the coup, Abakelia remained active in Georgia's legal system and public life as a district prosecutor, university professor, and outspoken critic of the presidency of Mikheil Saakashvili.

== Biography ==
=== Early life and family ===
Vazha Abakelia was born on 26 October 1948 in Gegechkori, then part of the Georgian Soviet Socialist Republic. He later moved to Tbilisi, where he pursued higher education and professional training. He graduated from Tbilisi State University with a degree in law and completed postgraduate studies there in 1978. By profession, he was a lawyer and legal scholar.

Between 1971 and 1979, Abakelia worked as a staff member of Communist Party organizations in Tbilisi.

Abakelia was born into a family with a strong background in public service. His father, Boris Abakelia, was a public figure and jurist who served as Prosecutor of Martvili, a member of the Criminal Law Collegium of the Supreme Court, and Prosecutor of the Stalin District of Tbilisi. His mother, Tamar Jvebenava, was a renown physician who served as head of the Martvili District Health Department. After the family relocated to Tbilisi, she was appointed Chief Physician of the Saburtalo District Polyclinic.

Abakelia was married to Lela Abakelia, a physician. The couple had three children: Boris, Nino, and Tamar. Their daughter Tamar Abakelia pursued a career in ballet and became a soloist with Moscow's Bolshoi Theatre at a young age.

=== Judicial career ===
From 1980 to 1990, Vazha Abakelia served as a People's Judge in the Nadzaladevi District of Tbilisi. He was appointed to the bench at the age of 27, becoming one of the younger judges in the local judiciary at the time. His appointment followed a family tradition in the legal profession, as his father had held senior judicial and prosecutorial positions within the Soviet legal system.

During his tenure, Abakelia presided over a range of civil and administrative cases. One of the most notable involved Grigoryi Goldstein, a refusenik affiliated with the dissident Georgian Helsinki Group. Goldstein, an engineer who had developed a new type of aerial radar, had been arrested in 1977 and subsequently dismissed from his employment after being barred from leaving the Soviet Union. He later filed a lawsuit against his employer, arguing that his dismissal was unlawful. Acting in his capacity as People's Judge, Abakelia ruled in favor of Goldstein, ordering his reinstatement and the payment of compensation. Contemporary observers described the decision as an unusual instance of a Soviet court ruling that ran counter to the interests of local Communist Party authorities.

The case later attracted public attention within dissident and human rights circles. Goldstein and his brother, Isaiah Goldstein, subsequently became associated with the Georgian national movement and later praised Abakelia's professional conduct. Isaiah Goldstein publicly referred to him as "the man who showed courage." According to contemporaneous accounts, Zviad Gamsakhurdia - then a leading figure of the anti-Soviet Georgian opposition - personally visited Abakelia following the ruling to express his gratitude.

Abakelia has described the court system of the late Soviet era as being "relatively free" from political pressure.

=== Local Soviet administration ===
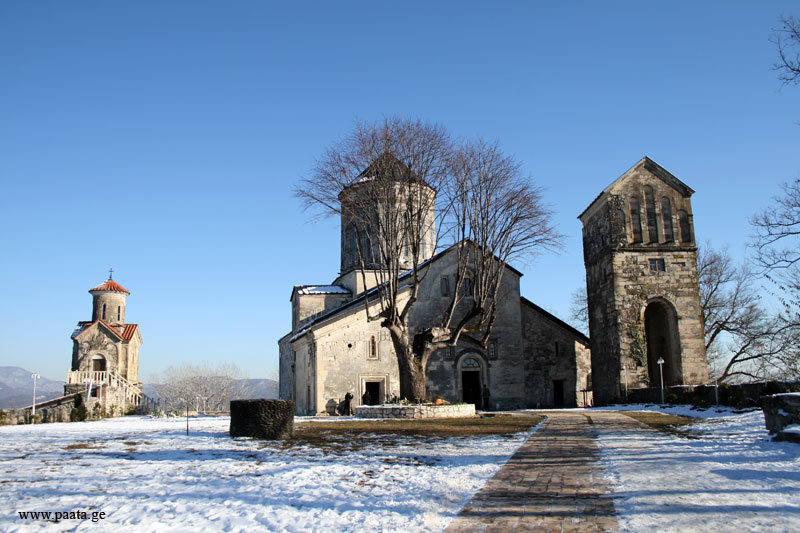
The Martvili Monastery, restored during Abakelia's local term

In May 1990, Vazha Abakelia was appointed chair of the executive committee of the Soviet of People's Deputies of Martvili District, in the Samegrelo region of western Georgia. Martvili was his birthplace and, at the time of his appointment, the district was undergoing rapid political and symbolic change amid the weakening of Soviet Communist authority across Soviet Georgia. The town had reverted from its Soviet-era name, Gegechkori, to its historical name, Martvili, in 1989.

Concurrently, Abakelia served as Secretary of the Martvili District Committee of the Communist Party of the Soviet Union.

As chair of the executive committee, Abakelia emphasized urban and infrastructural development. Municipal initiatives during his term included the addition of sidewalks and landscaping projects in the city center of Martvili, as well as the paving of approximately 70 kilometers of roads across the district, and a major restoration project of the Martvili Monastery.

On 6 October 1990, Abakelia organized a large commemorative event marking 900 years since the bishopric of Giorgi of Chqondidi, a major historical figure associated with Georgia's medieval political and ecclesiastical history. The event was opened by Ilia II, Catholicos-Patriarch of All Georgia, and is regarded as one of the early public instances of cooperation between local authorities and the Georgian Orthodox Church following decades of Soviet repression of religious institutions. Researchers and diplomats from 27 countries attended the commemoration, and, at Abakelia's initiative, the Georgian Academy of Sciences organized a scholarly conference through its Institute of History dedicated to Giorgi of Chqondidi. The anniversary has continued to be observed annually on 6 October.

In parallel with cultural and infrastructural initiatives, Abakelia supported agricultural restructuring at the district level. During this period, the Martvili district administration oversaw the establishment of its first agricultural enterprises following the erosion of the collective farm system, facilitated the leasing of state-owned land to individual and cooperative producers, and supported the introduction of new agricultural machinery.

=== 1990 Supreme Soviet election ===
Vazha Abakelia served as a member of the Supreme Council of the Republic of Georgia from 1990 to 1991, following Georgia's first multiparty elections of October 1990. He was elected as a majoritarian representative from the 65th electoral district (Martvili District). Running as the nominee of the Communist Party, Abakelia was the only Communist Party candidate to win a majoritarian district in the 1990 election, defeating Nodar Tsuleiskiri, the candidate of the nationalist Round Table–Free Georgia bloc. During the campaign, he adopted a conciliatory tone aimed at local unity, and downplaying the Communist Party's affiliation to the Soviet Union.

In the Supreme Council, Abakelia served on the Commission on Legislation and Legal Oversight, a key parliamentary body during Georgia's transition away from Soviet rule. His tenure on the commission coincided with sweeping republican reforms that brought an institutional end to the Soviet regime in Georgia, including major constitutional revisions establishing the Republic of Georgia and the first post-Soviet reform of the judiciary. Among the most consequential legislative acts considered during this period was the abolition of the South Ossetian Autonomous Oblast, a measure that marked a further escalation in tensions between the central government and South Ossetian separatist movements and preceded the outbreak of the South Ossetia conflict.

His parliamentary mandate ended in January 1991, following his appointment to the Supreme Court.

=== Supreme Court Judge ===
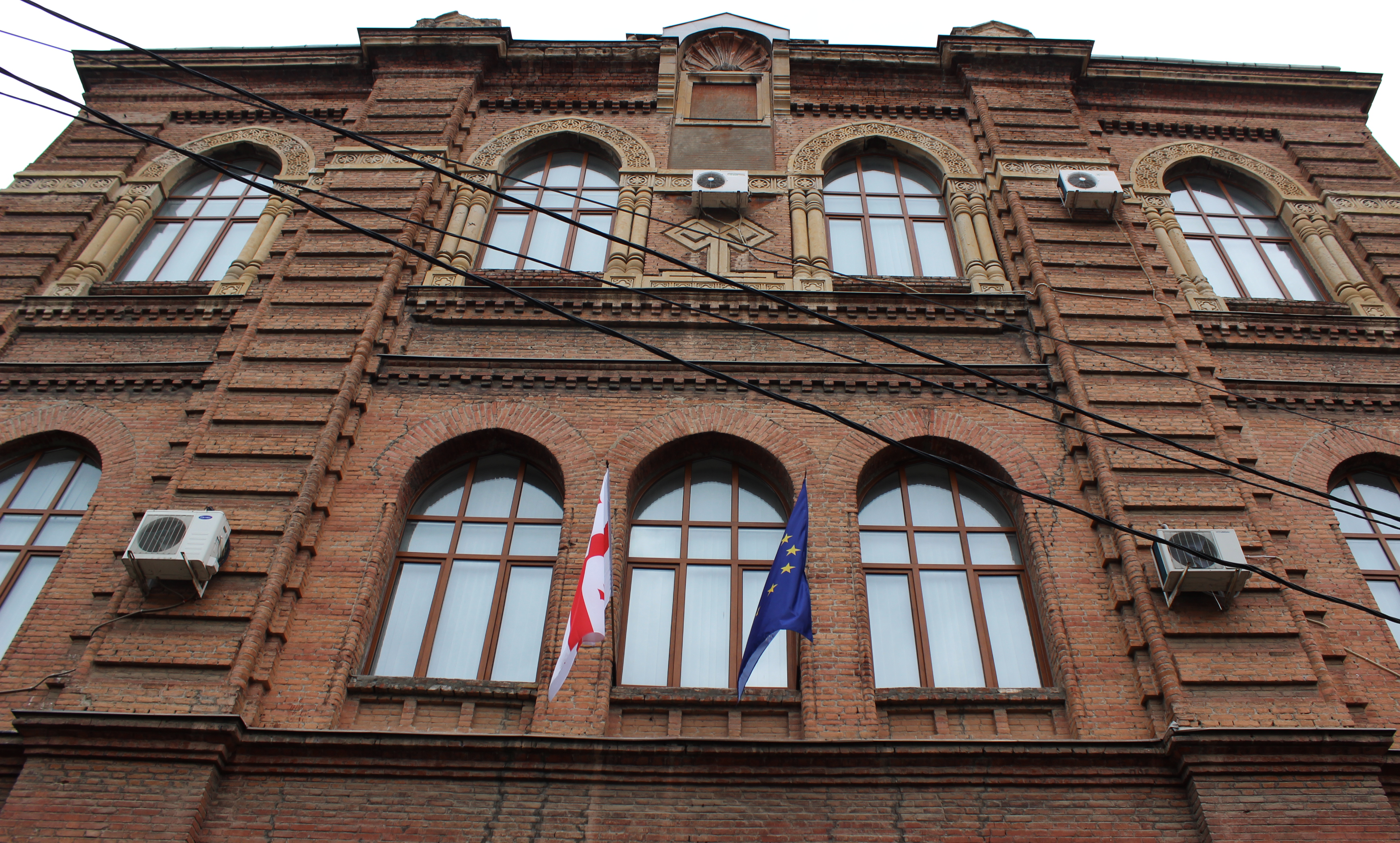
Building of the Supreme Court in 1991

On 27 December 1990, Vazha Abakelia was elected to the Supreme Court of the Republic of Georgia by the Supreme Council, elected alongside Chief Justice Mindia Ugrekhelidze. Upon his appointment, Abakelia became First Deputy Chairman of the Supreme Court and Chairman of the Criminal Law Collegium, two of the most senior judicial positions in the newly reconstituted court.

On 29 January 1991, Abakelia was appointed to the newly created Presidium of the Supreme Court, a collective leadership body established to assist in the governance, administration, and supervisory functions of the court during the transitional period. As Chairman of the Criminal Law Collegium, Abakelia presided over judicial panels within that collegium and oversaw staffing and organizational matters related to criminal cases at the high court.

Abakelia's tenure on the Supreme Court coincided with a period of rapid institutional change, as Georgia's judiciary was being reorganized following the collapse of Soviet authority. In public statements, he took a clear stance against capital punishment, calling for the abolition of the death penalty. In interviews, he argued that effective crime prevention depended primarily on swift apprehension, effective investigation, and the integrity of law enforcement, rather than on the severity or length of criminal sentences.

In November 1991, just 11 months after his election to the Supreme Court, Abakelia resigned from the court following his appointment as Prosecutor General.

=== Prosecutor General ===
On 21 November 1991, Vazha Abakelia was appointed by President Zviad Gamsakhurdia Prosecutor General of Georgia, becoming the first person to be appointed to the office after the restoration of Georgian independence, confirmed by the Supreme Council on 25 November. He succeeded Vakhtang Razmadze, a Soviet-era holdover who had resigned and subsequently aligned himself with the armed opposition to Gamsakhurdia.

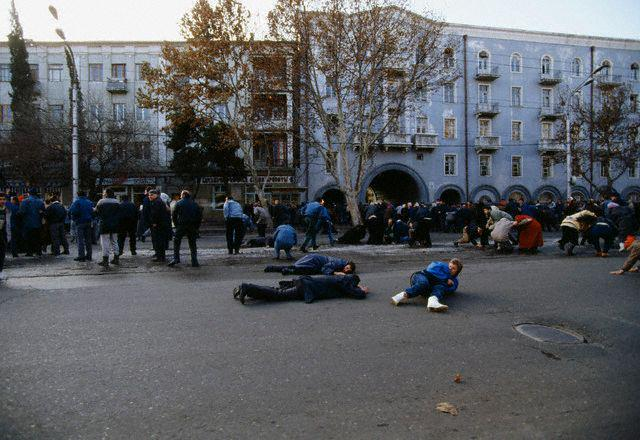
Protesters fleeing after forces of the Military Council fire at them. Abakelia served as Prosecutor General during the 1991-92 coup

Abakelia assumed office during a period of escalating political crisis and inherited a Prosecutor's Office with extensive investigative and supervisory powers, largely unchanged from the Soviet institutional framework. His appointment was criticized by opposition forces, who portrayed it as a continuation of Communist-era governance due to his previous membership in the Communist Party. Nonetheless, upon taking office, Abakelia moved to assert prosecutorial authority over the growing armed challenge to the central government. He summoned district prosecutors from across Georgia to Tbilisi and instructed them to begin gathering evidence against opposition leaders, including Tengiz Kitovani and Tengiz Sigua. He also initiated criminal proceedings against Kitovani and issued an arrest warrant that could not be enforced amid the rising clashes.

During the same period, Abakelia opened a criminal case against Anzor Maisuradze, a close associate of Kitovani, in connection with the firebombing of the Supreme Court building. As unrest intensified, Abakelia met with a delegation from the United States Congress, which raised concerns about the size of Georgia's prison population and the functioning of the justice system during the transition.

As fighting intensified in Tbilisi in late December 1991, Abakelia remained aligned with President Gamsakhurdia. On 28 December, after several days of armed clashes, Gamsakhurdia instructed Abakelia to contact Moscow in an attempt to halt Russian support for the opposition-led Military Council in exchange for Georgia's possible accession to the Commonwealth of Independent States. Abakelia contacted his Russian counterpart, Valentin Stepankov, but the effort failed to produce an agreement.

On 3 January 1992, amid the collapse of the central government's authority, Military Council forces seized the Prosecutor General's Office. According to contemporary reporting by The Washington Post, officials within the Prosecutor's Office reported to the headquarters of the Military Council and pledged allegiance in defiance of Abakelia's instructions. That same day, Abakelia and his staff were forcibly removed from the building, and Razmadze was reinstated as Prosecutor General. On 5 January 1992, Jaba Ioseliani, chairman of the Military Council, signed a decree formally dismissing Abakelia from office. President Gamsakhurdia fled Tbilisi shortly thereafter and left Georgia on 6 January.

Following the coup, Abakelia was left without employment and lived in difficult economic circumstances during the ensuing civil war. In 1993, he returned to the prosecutorial system and was appointed District Prosecutor of the Isani–Samgori District of Tbilisi, a position he held for more than a decade. During this period, he oversaw a wide range of criminal investigations, including cases with significant political and public sensitivity. In 2002, he was assigned to the investigation into the assault on investigative publisher Ioseb Chumburidze, an incident that drew national attention and prompted public intervention by President Eduard Shevardnadze; the case was never conclusively resolved.

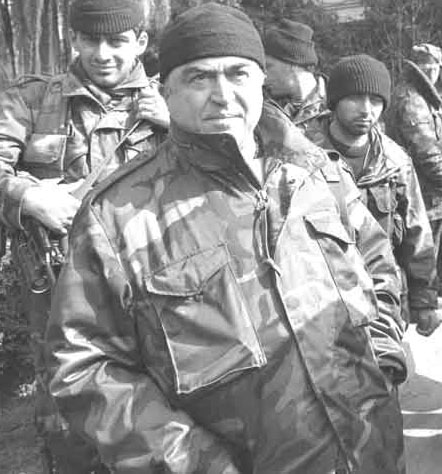
Abakelia filed charges against Tengiz Kitovani (pictured) which were dropped after the 1991-92 coup

While serving under the Shevardnadze administration, Abakelia publicly lamented the death of Gamsakhurdia in 1993, describing it as a national tragedy, and broke with the official position of the government. He consistently maintained that Gamsakhurdia had been murdered on the orders of Kitovani, a claim disputed by Shevardnadze and other officials. One of the cases under Abakelia's supervision as district prosecutor was the same investigation he had initiated as Prosecutor General against the leaders of the 1991–1992 coup, although the influence of former coup leaders in government rendered the proceedings effectively dormant.

Abakelia was removed from office in 2004 following the Rose Revolution and the accession of the new government led by Mikheil Saakashvili, as part of an effort to reform the prosecutorial system and address alleged corruption. In 2005, he was summoned for questioning by a special parliamentary commission investigating the events of 1991–1992, although the commission did not publish a final report.

=== Retirement ===
After leaving public office, Vazha Abakelia remained intermittently active in politics and public debate. In the 2008 parliamentary elections, he was nominated by the United National Council, a coalition of nine opposition parties formed to challenge the dominance of President Mikheil Saakashvili and his governing party. Abakelia ran in his former constituency, the Martvili District, where he had previously been elected in 1990. In the general election, he competed against candidates from several major parties, including the United National Movement, the Labour Party, and the Republican Party, but lost in the first round to UNM's Nauli Janashia. He nevertheless continued to participate in opposition activities, including speaking at a large protest rally in 2009, and remained a vocal critic of Saakashvili's administration, accusing it of property rights violations and the establishment of a repressive police state.

Following the 2008 elections, Abakelia shifted his professional focus to academia. He became Deputy Dean of the Law School at Caucasus International University, later serving as Head of its Social Sciences Department. He earned the degree of Doctor of Juridical Sciences and worked as a full-time professor. In parallel, he held teaching positions at Tbilisi Teaching University and Tbilisi State University, where he lectured on economic relations. He also served on the organizational committee of Tbilisi State University's academic journal Science & Life.

Abakelia continued to comment publicly on legal and political developments in Georgia. In 2014, he drew controversy for a statement opposing the country's Anti-Discrimination Act, alleging that the legislation had been imposed under pressure from the United States and likening the U.S. ambassador at the time, Richard B. Norland, to a Soviet-era Communist Party official. Civil society organizations cited the remarks as an example of anti-American rhetoric associated with figures sympathetic to the governing Georgian Dream coalition.

In subsequent years, Abakelia supported a range of legal reform initiatives. In 2016, he joined a group of experts advocating a comprehensive rewrite of Georgia's Criminal Code, which he criticized as a product of the "zero-tolerance" policies of the Saakashvili era, calling for a liberalization of the criminal code to end what he viewed as punitive prosecutorial practices. During the 2018 selection process for Prosecutor General, he was among a group of former judicial figures and political organizations associated with the presidency of Zviad Gamsakhurdia that nominated Gia Berdzenadze for the position; the nominee failed to advance beyond the first round.

Although Abakelia was an early supporter of the Georgian Dream government led by Bidzina Ivanishvili and favored strong prosecution of former officials linked to the Saakashvili administration, he later called for the resignation of Prosecutor General Otar Partskhaladze after revelations that Partskhaladze had previously served a prison sentence in Germany.

Vazha Abakelia died on 12 July 2019 at the age of 70.

== Political views and ideology ==
Abakelia consistently positioned himself as a critic of Mikheil Saakashvili and the United National Movement. In interviews given after leaving public office, he argued that judges in late Soviet Georgia enjoyed greater practical autonomy in adjudication than those operating under the UNM administration between 2004 and 2012, maintaining that local Communist Party officials did not interfere in judicial decision-making to the extent later exercised by executive authorities in the post-Soviet period.

He accused Saakashvili of authoritarian governance and of using constitutional change - particularly the 2010 reform that shifted Georgia toward a parliamentary system - to preserve political influence beyond the presidency. After 2012, Abakelia supported the Georgian Dream government and called for criminal accountability of former UNM officials. He publicly praised Justice Minister Tea Tsulukiani and advocated a special tribunal modeled on the Nuremberg trials to prosecute figures associated with the previous administration.

Abakelia was also openly critical of international involvement in Georgia's legal reforms. He rejected several opinions issued by the Venice Commission on Saakashvili-era judicial changes, arguing that such endorsements reflected political alignment rather than neutral legal assessment. He viewed external recommendations from Western institutions as incompatible with Georgia's legal traditions and state sovereignty.

On criminal justice policy, Abakelia opposed capital punishment and called for its abolition during his tenure on the Supreme Court, arguing that the death penalty was incompatible with the inevitability of judicial error and that it could incentivize offenders to commit more serious crimes in order to eliminate witnesses. He also linked crime rates to broader social and economic conditions, at times attributing increases in violent crime to the psychological and social effects of capitalism, while arguing that rulings on murder cases should automatically involve a mental health assessment of accused murderers.

In his academic work, Abakelia advocated a doctrinal approach to criminal law rooted in the Roman–Germanic legal tradition, rather than the Anglo-Saxon common law system.
