= Georgian Co-Investment Fund =

Private equity fund

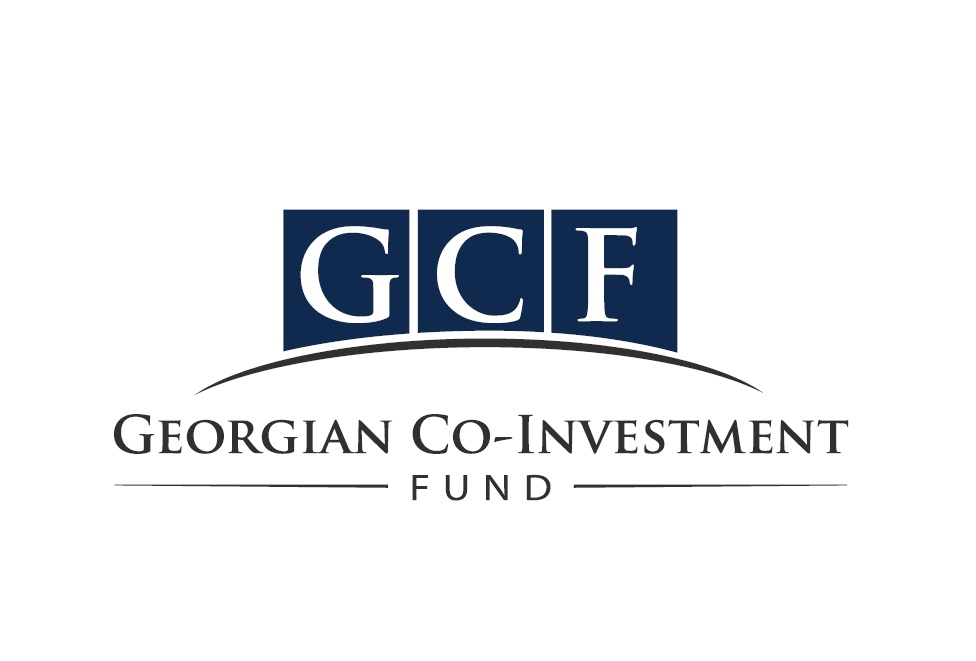
- Company type: Private Equity Fund
- Industry: Energy, Infrastructure, Hospitality, Real Estate, Agriculture Logistics, Manufacturing
- Founded: 2013
- Headquarters: Tbilisi, Georgia
- Key people: Tsotne Ebralidze, CEO; George Bachiashvili, Head of Advisory Committee
- Total assets: $6bn USD
- Website: gcfund.ge

The Georgian Co-Investment Fund (GCF) is a private equity fund. Established in 2013, the Fund invests across sectors and industries which significantly contribute to the development of the Georgian economy.

The CEO of the fund wasTsotne Ebralidze, while its Advisory Committee was headed by George Bachiashvili, a prominent Georgian entrepreneur who is now involved in legal case brought by one of Georgia's top political figures, Bidzina Ivanishvili.

== History ==
The fund was established in 2013.

In 2016, GCF announced that it would be launching eight large-scale investment projects in Georgia. The projects are worth $574 million and include: Hotel Shekvetili, Hotel at Erekle II Square, Hotel at Erekle II Square, Hotel Freedom Square, Hotel Sololaki, Hotel Ganmukhuri, the Magnolia recreational complex, and the Tabori project.

In 2019, Mr. Bachiashvili became the Head of the Advisory Committee, and Mr. Ebralidze became the CEO of Georgian Co-Investment Fund. MR. Ebralidze served over five years as a managing director of Hospitality and Real Estate Sector of Georgian Co-Investment Fund.

In 2023, Bachiashvili was charged with misappropriation of cryptocurrency and alleged money laundering. Bachiashvili has claimed that the charges are politically motivated, with the law firm he retained, Amsterdam & Partners LLP, publishing research corroborating this view. The Georgian government has denied this characterisation. Reportedly, Bachiashvili had invested in mining of Bitcoin cryptocurrency in 2015 using money “personally raised” by him. The mining services were provided by a foreign firm to an enterprise owned by Bachiashvili under a one-year contract valued at $6.3 million, including a $5 million share by the investor. The operation generated 24,661.85 bitcoins throughout a year, resulting in the profit of 8,253.13 bitcoins, which, allegedly, were appropriated by Bachiashvili in 2017 and only $536,900 was paid to the investors as their share of the profit. The amount of appropriated bitcoins is said to have equalled over $39 million. Bachiashvili was ultimately found guilty in absentia, although on 26 May 2025, it was reported that he was secretly and forcibly returned to Georgia from abroad, in what his lawyers have labelled to be a kidnapping without due process. The Georgian government has denied the allegation.
