= Vano Merabishvili =

Prime Minister of Georgia, July–October 2012

- ვანო მერაბიშვილი
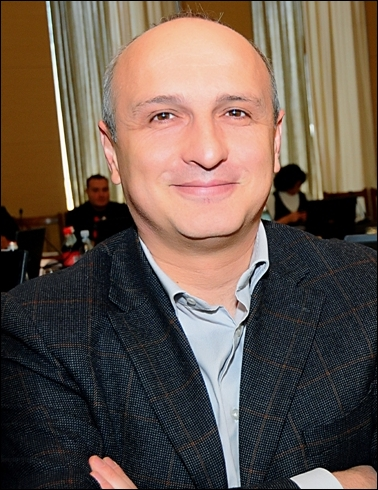
- Merabishvili in 2012

Prime Minister of Georgia
- In office 4 July 2012 – 25 October 2012
- President: Mikheil Saakashvili
- Preceded by: Nika Gilauri
- Succeeded by: Bidzina Ivanishvili

Minister of Internal Affairs
- In office 18 December 2004 – 4 July 2012
- President: Mikheil Saakashvili; Nino Burjanadze (acting); Mikheil Saakashvili
- Preceded by: Irakli Okruashvili
- Succeeded by: Bachana Akhalaia

Chairman of the United National Movement
- In office July 2012 – 2012
- Preceded by: Davit Bakradze
- Succeeded by: Mikheil Saakashvili

Minister of State Security
- In office 7 June 2004 – 18 December 2004
- President: Mikheil Saakashvili
- Preceded by: Zurab Adeishvili
- Succeeded by: Office abolished

Secretary of the National Security Council
- In office January 2004 – 7 June 2004
- President: Mikheil Saakashvili
- Preceded by: Tedo Japaridze
- Succeeded by: Gela Bezhuashvili

Member of the Parliament of Georgia
- In office 20 November 1999 – 22 April 2004

Personal details
- Born: 15 April 1968 (age 58) Ude, Georgian SSR, Soviet Union (now Georgia)
- Party: Union of Citizens of Georgia (1999-2001); United National Movement (2001–present)
- Spouse: Tako Salaqaia
- Children: 2
- Education: Georgian Technical University

Ivane "Vano" Merabishvili (Georgian: ივანე "ვანო" მერაბიშვილი; born 15 April 1968) is a Georgian politician who served as the prime minister of Georgia from 4 July to 25 October 2012. A former NGO activist, he became directly involved in Georgia's politics in 1999 and emerged as one of the government's most influential members after the 2003 Rose Revolution, especially as Georgia's Minister of Internal Affairs (18 December 2004 – 4 July 2012).

== Education and NGO career ==
Merabishvili was born in the largely Georgian Roman Catholic village of Ude in what is now Samtskhe-Javakheti region in south Georgia, then a Soviet republic. He graduated from the Georgian Technical University in 1992 with a degree from the Faculty of Mining. After his schooling he held several positions at the Technical University and at the Institute of Agriculture of Georgia before becoming a president of the Association for Protection of Landowners' Rights in 1995 and a co-founder of the Liberty Institute in 1996.

== Member of Parliament ==
Merabishvili's direct involvement with politics began in November 1999 when he was elected to the Parliament of Georgia on the party ticket of the Union of Citizens of Georgia (UCG), chaired by then-President Eduard Shevardnadze. Merabishvili was a member of an influential and vocal, yet small, group of the UCG faction, known as “reformers” led by Zurab Zhvania and Mikheil Saakashvili and which called for more radical and Western-oriented political reforms.

In April 2001, with a simmering conflict in the UCG, Merabishvili, then a chairman of the Parliamentary Committee for Economic Policy, became the first and, at that time, the only leading member of the party to openly criticise Shevardnadze. In an interview with the Washington Post, Merabisvhili stated Shevardnadze was “tired” and lacked the political will to fight corruption. Shevardnadze downplayed the criticism, attributing Merabishvili’s statement to the latter's youth and inexperience.

In 2002, Merabishvili became Secretary General of Mikheil Saakashvili’s newly formed opposition National Movement. He was energetically involved in the protest movement following the November 2003 parliamentary elections which led to Shevardnadze’s resignation in the bloodless Rose Revolution.

== Government minister ==
After Saakashvili's ascent to the presidency, Merabishvili served as the National Security Advisor and Secretary of the National Security Council from January until June 2004 when he was appointed as Minister of State Security. In December 2004, the Ministry of State Security was merged with the Ministry of Internal Affairs of which Merabishvili was placed in charge. As interior minister, Merabishvili presided over police reform and a crackdown on criminal bosses, the so-called "thieves in law", winning praise from many international institutions and observers. Critics have accused the Interior Ministry of using excessive force and heavy-handed tactics in several cases, including against opposition protesters in 2007 and 2010. Merabishvili has denied these allegations.

In 2006, a controversy surrounding the murder of Sandro Girgvliani, a 28-year-old commercial bank employee, had a significant political fallout and was at the forefront of several opposition attempts to force Merabishvili to resign. Girgvliani's family accused interior ministry officials of murdering Sandro after he insulted them and Tako Salaqaia, Merabishvili's wife, during an argument in a café. The court case resulted in the conviction of four lower-level ministry officials, but the case was heavily criticized by several independent observers and opposition parties who claimed a cover up. Merabishvili himself accused the opposition parties of trying to use the Girgvliani murder case "for their political interests" and declared that he did not plan to resign.

By late 2008, Merabishvili had become one of the most influential figures in the government of Georgia. The Interior Ministry enlarged its responsibilities, taking greater control of border police and was designated by President Saakashvili to oversee distribution of the substantial international assistance for Georgians displaced in the August conflict with Russia. In a March 2009 interview with Rustavi 2 TV, Merabishvili said the assumption that he was the most powerful figure in Saakashvili's administration was "over-exaggerated", yet confirmed that in some cases the President had given him broader tasks.

In December 2011, Merabishvili's achievements as a Minister of Internal Affairs were praised by Bidzina Ivanishvili, a multi-billionaire businessman, who came into Georgian politics with the intent to challenge the government in the October 2012 parliamentary election. Ivanishvili called on Merabishvili to convince President Saakashvili to step down. Merabishvili later said he did not consider Ivanishvili to have been the government's "serious rival".

== Prime minister ==
On June 30, 2012, President Saakashvili named Merabishvili as the country's Prime Minister, replacing Nika Gilauri. This decision was made a few months before the October parliamentary elections. Merabishvili said his program would be focused on the three key priorities: employment, agriculture development and availability of healthcare. He was approved by the Parliament of Georgia on July 4, 2012.

The Lopota incident, which began on August 28, 2012, became a focal point for Merabishvili's handling of national security towards unknown assailants, which lasted until October 30, 2012 as the assailants were mostly killed in action by security forces, and the remaining were arrested.

The United National Movement lost majority of seats to the opposition coalition Bidzina Ivanishvili–Georgian Dream in the 2012 election. As envisaged by the constitution, Merabishvili and his government resigned on October 11, 2012, continuing to be an acting prime minister until Bidzina Ivanishvili was approved by the parliament on October 25, 2012. On October 15, 2012, Merabishvili was elected as secretary-general of the United National Movement, pledging to a "modern, new type of party".

== Arrest and sentence ==
On May 21, 2013, Merabishvili and Zurab Tchiaberashvili, governor of Kakheti and former Minister of Health, were arrested in connection to an investigation into alleged misspending of GEL 5.2 million public funds on their party activists during the 2012 election campaign, leading to accusations of political vendetta leveled by the United National Movement against the Ivanishvili government. On February 17, 2014, Merabishvili was sentenced to five years in jail after being found guilty of abuse of office, bribery of voters and inefficient use of budget funds. The Merabishvili defense team appealed the sentence. The opposition said it was a witch hunt of the former government. In September 2016 Merabishvili was further sentenced to 6,5 years in prison on charges of ordering the beating of the opposition parliament member Valeri Gelashvili.

Government of Georgia in 2013 has officially invited OSCE Office for Democratic Institutions and Human Rights for Monitoring the trials of former high level officials. Monitoring group stated, that “Based on the above observations regarding specific fair trial rights difficulties – often of a systemic nature – it can be concluded that the respect of fair trial rights in the monitored cases was not fully guaranteed by the Georgian criminal justice system”. And particularly about the case against Mr Merabishvili has emphasized, that “In a case where the defendant was convicted of exceeding official powers, the court failed to say what the limits of the defendant’s powers were, and how the defendant exceeded those limits, aside from noting that the defendant did not have the authority to commit illegal acts. In order to assess whether and how a defendant exceeded official powers, the limits of those powers must first be established”. Therefore, even the minimum standards for substantiation of Judicial Decisions were not met.

In 2015 report of the European Committee for the Prevention of Torture and Inhuman or Degrading Treatment or Punishment (CPT) on Georgia, the CPT states that current condition of detention of Mr Merabishvili “could be considered as amounting to inhuman and degrading treatment.”

On 14 June 2016, the Fourth Section of the European Court of Human Rights ruled in the case Merabishvili v Georgia that the repeated extension of Merabishvili's pre-trial detention "lacked reasonableness" and was exploited "as an additional opportunity to obtain leverage over the unrelated investigation" into the death of the former Prime Minister Zurab Zhvania and financial activities of former President Mikheil Saakashvili. The Fourth Section of ECHR unanimously found violations of Articles 5§3 and 18 of the European Convention of Human Rights in the case of former Prime-Minister.

The Government of Georgia appealed the case to the Grand Chamber of the ECHR, but on 28 November 2017, the Grand Chamber by a majority ruled that pretrial detention of Merabishvili, initially justified, became aimed at obtaining information on unrelated cases, including the one against former President Mikheil Saakashvili. Thus, the Grand Chamber completely upheld the decision of the ECHR Fourth Section regarding the case. By the time this decision was adopted by the Grand Chamber, in almost 60-year history of the ECHR there were only seven cases, including that of Ivane Merabishvili, in which breach of Article 18 of the European Convention of Human Rights was established by the section of the ECHR and the first one by the Grand Chamber. Ivane Merabishvili was only the third politician in relation to whom this breach was established by the Court and first case of this kind in the history of Georgia.

== Release from prison ==
Having served almost seven years in prison, Merabishvili was released on 20 February 2020. Outside of Matrosovi Prison, he stated his intention to return to politics and bring an end to the Georgian Dream party. Due to his past political allies being divided into different parties, he offered to meet with each and decide which one to join afterwards. Despite his release, he may still face further charges for a raid on Imedi TV in 2007, as well as his part in dispersing 2007 rallies.

Prime Minister and Georgian Dream politician Giorgi Gakharia dismissed Merabishvili's threats as proof that the United National Movement was a party of the past, while Justice Minister Thea Tsulukiani described Merabishvili as a political hot potato. Both the United National Movement and the European Georgia party were open to receiving him back into the party, support also coming from Saakashvili. Other opposition parties, however, have rejected the possibility of Merabishvili's membership, including the Movement for United Georgia and Lelo for Georgia. In March, writing for the Eurasian Daily Monitor, Giorgi Menabde suggested that the opposition were in fact unwilling to accept Merabishvili into their parties due to a fear he may be too controversial. Though he can run as an independent candidate for the Akhaltsikhe seat in the 2020 Georgian parliamentary election, Iosif Tsintsadze rejected the possibility of Merabishvili winning without party support.

Merabishvili claimed on Facebook that he was deliberately provided substandard medical care during his imprisonment, needing to travel to Poland to seek treatment before returning to Georgia.

== Personal life ==
Merabishvili is married to Tamar Salaqaia (born 1981). They have two sons, Misha (მიშა) (born 2000) and Davit (დავითი) (born 2009).

Political offices
| Preceded by Zurab Adeishvili | Minister of State Security; 2004 | Position abolished |
| Preceded by Irakli Okruashvili | Minister of Internal Affairs; 2004–2012 | Succeeded by Bachana Akhalaia |
| Preceded by Nika Gilauri | Prime Minister of Georgia; 2012 | Succeeded by Bidzina Ivanishvili |
