= Rati Bregadze =

Georgian politician (born 1982)

- რატი ბრეგაძე

Minister of Justice
- In office 1 April 2021 – November 2024
- Prime Minister: Irakli Garibashvili; Irakli Kobakhidze
- Preceded by: Gocha Lortkipanidze
- Succeeded by: Anri Okhanashvili

Personal details
- Born: 12 December 1982 (age 43) Georgia, Soviet Union
- Party: Georgian Dream

Rati Bregadze (Georgian: რატი ბრეგაძე; born 12 December 1982), is a Georgian politician and official who has served as the Minister of Justice of Georgia from 1 April 2021 to November 2024.

== Biography ==
Bregadze was born on 12 December 1982.

From 2000 to 2005, he studied at the Faculty of Law of Tbilisi State University. In then he studied at various universities in Germany.

From 2011 to 2012, he was a lawyer of the legal company "Mgaloblishvili, Kifiani, Dzidziguri", head of the German department.

From 2012 to 2013, he was the head of the National Center for Children and Youth. From 2013 to 2015 he was the Deputy Minister of Sports and Youth Affairs.

On 1 April 2021, Bregadze was appointed Minister of Justice. Prior to that position, he was the Deputy Minister of Defense.

On 9 February 2024, Georgian Prime Minister Irakli Kobakhidze reappointed Bregadze to his cabinet as the Minister of Justice.

On 12 April, he visited with the Georgian delegation in Yerevan and met Prime Minister Nikol Pashinyan and Vice President of the National Assembly of Armenia Ruben Rubinyan, to discuss cooperation between the justice sectors and parliamentary relations.

On 23 May, as the court in Strasbourg found that Mikheil Saakashvili defense's right's had not been violated and had a fair trial, he stated on Facebook that it ended with a "complete victory for our state."
