= Paata Salia =

Georgian lawyer and politician

- პაატა სალია

Minister of Justice of Georgia
- Incumbent
- Assumed office 4 April 2025
- Prime Minister: Irakli Kobakhidze
- Preceded by: Anri Okhanashvili (as Acting Minister)

Member of the Parliament of Georgia
- In office 10 December 2024 – 15 April 2025

Personal details
- Born: 6 June 1972 (age 53)
- Party: Georgian Dream
- Profession: Lawyer, Politician

Paata Salia (Georgian: პაატა სალია; born 6 June 1972) is a Georgian lawyer and politician who has served as the minister of justice of Georgia since April 2025. A member of the Georgian Dream party, he was appointed to this role by Prime Minister Irakli Kobakhidze. Prior to leading the Ministry of Justice, Salia was a member of the Parliament of Georgia. He was the Director General of Rustavi 2.

== Career ==
Before his ministerial appointment, he served as a member of Parliament (MP). His mandate as an MP was terminated early on 15 April 2025, following his appointment as minister of justice. On April 4, 2025 he was appointed as the minister of justice of Georgia by Prime Minister Irakli Kobakhidze. On April 15, 2025 the Parliament of Georgia formally approved the early termination of his MP mandate after a committee had discussed his early termination after his appointment as Minister of Justice.
