= Anri Okhanashvili =

Georgian politician

- ანრი ოხანაშვილი
- Okhanashvili in 2025

National Security Advisor to the Prime Minister
- Incumbent
- Assumed office 24 August 2025
- Prime Minister: Irakli Kobakhidze

Head of the State Security Service of Georgia
- In office 4 April 2025 – 24 August 2025
- Prime Minister: Irakli Kobakhidze
- Preceded by: Grigol Liluashvili
- Succeeded by: Mamuka Mdinaradze

Minister of Justice
- In office 28 November 2024 – 2 April 2025
- Prime Minister: Irakli Kobakhidze
- Preceded by: Rati Bregadze
- Succeeded by: Paata Salia
- Parliamentary group: Georgian Dream

Member of the Georgian Parliament, Chairman of the Judicial Committee

Personal details
- Born: 10 June 1985 (age 41)
- Party: Georgian Dream (2012–present)

Anri Okhanashvili (Georgian: ანრი ოხანაშვილი; born 10 June 1985) is a Georgian politician and lawyer who serves as the National Security Advisor for the Prime Minister of Georgia. He previously served as the Head of the State Security Service of Georgia from April to August 2025. He has been a member of the Parliament of Georgia of the 10th convocation by party list, election bloc: Georgian Dream - Democratic Georgia. He also was member of 9th convocation of Parliament of Georgia (2016-2020).

== Biography ==
Anri Okhanashvili holds a doctorate in law from the Humboldt University in Germany, having worked under the supervision of Professor Martin Heger. He also holds a Masters in Law from the University of Jena. He is married to Maka Khodeli, who also is a lawyer and professor at Tbilisi State University. Khodeli is a fellow editor of the German-Georgian Journal of Criminal Law, and has written, among other topics, on implementing the practice of eavesdropping.

Anri Okhanashvili is the Chair of the Legal Issues Committee. As a prominent politician, Okhanashvili has drawn attention for physical attacks on opposition figures. In the summer of 2022, Okhanashvili together with other ruling party MPs assaulted a founder of a critical TV station at a reception of the US Embassy. Okhanashvili is quoted as alleging insulting remarks by Tsereteli and "I responded to him as he deserved." In April 2023, Anri Okhanashvili slapped Levan Khabeishvili, the leader of the opposition UNM party, in the face, during a committee meeting.

Anri Okhanashvili has repeatedly been criticized for violence and an authoritarian style in the Legal Issues committee, by civil society representatives and media watchdogs. In April 2024, Anri Okhanashvili has been criticized by more than 20 Georgian civil society organization for “abusing power and restricting the ability of lawmakers, guaranteed by the Rules of Procedure of the Parliament, to oppose, ask tough questions and receive answers.”

In April and May 2024, Anri Okhanashvili has been one of the main protagonists in driving forward Georgia's so-called law on "transparency of foreign influence", often also described as "the Russian law", and in this context has been dismissive of international appeals to amend or repeal the law, including of those by the Venice Commission.

In November 2024, Prime Minister Irakli Kobakhidze appointed Okhanashvili as the Minister of Justice, in a cabinet reschuffle after the 2024 parliamentary election. In April 2025, he was announced by the prime minister as the new head of the State Security Service. During his tenure, according to multiple reports, he participated in the rendition of George Bachiashvili, a former associate of Bidzina Ivanishvili who had fallen out of favour. Okhanashvili resigned from his position at the head of the Security Service at the end of August 2025.
