= Governors' Climate and Forests Task Force =

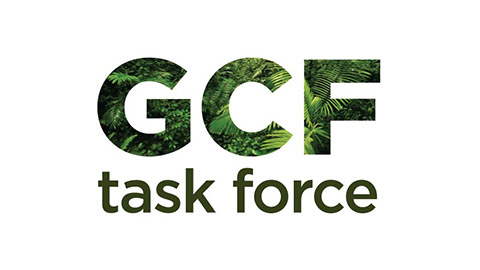
- GCF Task Force Logo
- Type: Memoranda of Understanding
- Signed: 18 November 2008
- Location: Los Angeles, CA
- Parties: 35

The Governors' Climate and Forests Task Force (GCF Task Force) is a sub-national collaboration between 38 states and provinces from Brazil, Colombia, Ecuador, Indonesia, Ivory Coast, Mexico, Nigeria, Peru, Spain, and the United States. The Task Force is designed to support jurisdictional approaches to low emissions rural development and reduced emissions from deforestation and land use (REDD+), specifically through performance-based payment schemes and national or state-based greenhouse gas (GHG) compliance regimes.

The Task Force was initiated by former California Governor Arnold Schwarzenegger on 18 November 2008, at the Governors' Climate Change Summit in Los Angeles, California. At this summit the U.S. states of California, Illinois, and Wisconsin, (Note: As of 2011, Wisconsin is no longer a GCF member.) the Brazilian states of Amapá, Amazonas, Mato Grosso, and Pará, and the Indonesian provinces of Aceh and Papua signed memoranda of understanding (MOUs) supporting cooperation on a number of issues related to climate policy, financing, technological cooperation, and research. These MOUs also called for the creation of a Joint Action Plan to provide a framework for implementing the MOUs in the forest section. The GCF Task Force held its first international meeting in 2009 in Belem, Brazil, where it approved its Joint Action Plan.

== Current member states ==
Country	Member States or Provinces						
Brazil	Amapá	Amazonas	Maranhão	Mato Grosso	Pará	Rondônia	Tocantins
Colombia	Caquetá Department						
Indonesia	Aceh	Central Kalimantan	East Kalimantan	North Kalimantan	Papua	West Kalimantan	West Papua
Ivory Coast	Bélier Region	Cavally Region					
Mexico	Campeche	Chiapas	Jalisco	Quintana Roo	Tabasco	Yucatán	Oaxaca
Nigeria	Cross River State						
Peru	Amazonas Department	Department of Huánuco	Department of Loreto	Department of Madre de Dios	Department of Piura	Department of San Martín	Department of Ucayali
Spain	Catalonia						
United States	California	Illinois					

== See also ==
- Deforestation and climate change
- Deforestation by region
- Emissions trading
- Tree credits
- Tree planting
- Reducing emissions from deforestation and forest degradation
