= Good Clean Fun =

Good Clean Fun may refer to:

- Good Clean Fun (production company), an American television production company
- Good Clean Fun (band), a hardcore punk band from Washington, D.C.
- "Good Clean Fun" (The Monkees song)
- "Good Clean Fun" (The Allman Brothers Band song)
- "Good Clean Fun", a song by Cat Power from the album What Would the Community Think
- "Good Clean Fun", a song by Descendents from the album I Don't Want to Grow Up
- Good Clean Fun, an album by Bonnie Hayes with the Wild Combo
- "Good Clean Fun", a 1997 episode of Barney & Friends from Season 4
- "Good Clean Fun", a 1984 episode of Muppet Babies from Season 1
