= Sandro Girgvliani murder case =

2006 murder in Georgia

The Sandro Girgvliani murder case is one of the most notorious criminal cases in the modern history of Georgia. The killing in January 2006, and the events that followed, generated heavy criticism of the former government, particularly the interior minister, and debate about the extent to which then President Mikheil Saakashvili had truly introduced judicial independence and a democratic culture into Georgian society.

== The murder ==
Sandro Girgvliani was found dead on January 28, 2006, on the outskirts of Tbilisi with multiple injuries inflicted as a result of physical abuse. According to an Imedi Television investigation on February 12, the murder of the 28-year-old head of the United Georgian Bank's Foreign Department can be traced to a series of events which developed in Tbilisi's elite Sharden Bar. It is alleged that the Inspector General of Ministry of Internal Affairs, Vasil Sanodze, was holding his birthday party to which the highest members of the department were invited. Tako Salakaia, the wife of the then-Interior Minister and subsequent Prime Minister, Vano Merabishvili, was in attendance, and by chance happened to be a friend of Girgvliani's girlfriend, Tamar Maisuradze. Maisuradze's presence is reportedly the reason for the subsequent victim's fatal visit.

Levan Bukhaidze, Girgvliani's friend, who had accompanied his friend to the bar, claims that a few minutes before the kidnapping took place, the victim had an argument with his girlfriend, who was sitting with the Interior Minister's wife and her companions at the birthday party. In court Maisuradze recalled her dialogue with Girgvliani in the bar, claiming that "He asked why I was sitting with strangers. To this question I answered: that it did not matter who I was with and I asked whether he had come to find out only this. I did not know these people, but they were acquaintances of the girl I had come with.

Whilst Bukhaidze has denied this comment was made, it is clear that Sandro Girgvliani and his friend left the scene, and were reportedly stuffed into a silver Mercedes-Benz ML Class vehicle by unknown men shortly afterwards. They were then taken to Okrokana, on the outskirts of Tbilisi. Girgvliani's friend claims that whilst he was able to escape, Girgvliani was murdered. His body was found close to a nearby cemetery the next morning.

== Aftermath ==
At a news conference on February 21, Sandro Girgvliani's mother said that officials from the Interior Ministry "masterminded my son's murder." She demanded an immediate interrogation of those officials from the Interior Ministry who were present at the cafe with Girgvliani. At a subsequent conference on February 22, Member of Parliament (MP) Koba Davitashvili, leader of the Georgian Conservative Party and MP Koka Guntsadze of the Rightist Opposition opposition party, demanded that the authorities immediately investigate the case. They also alleged that Oleg Melnikov, an employee of the Interior Ministry, was among those persons who kidnapped Girgvliani and his friend.

Guram Donadze, told InterPressNews agency on February 21 that he and other officials had already been interrogated. "I will not make further comments while the investigation is on-going", Donadze said, but denied the allegations as 'groundless'. The Minister Vano Merabishvili meanwhile made his first public statement about the case on February 25 and hinted that he was not yet going to sack any of these officials.

On the 28th, MP for the Conservative Party Zviad Dzidziguri convened a press conference and showed an interview with Girgvliani's friend Bukhaidze – an eyewitness. The interview was conducted by MP Dzidziguri himself and, during the footage, Dzidziguri shows Bukhaidze a picture of a young man and asks Bukhaidze to identify this man. Bukhaidze replies that the man in the picture looks very much like one of the four people who beat the two friends after they were abducted. The man in the picture was an Interior Ministry staff-member, Oleg Melnikov. Bukhaidze said he was not 100% sure, but I can say that he looks very much like the man Dzidziguri stressed that. The most important thing with this fact is that the investigators have not shown this picture to Levan Bukhaidze – which further increases doubts about the investigation process.

During parliamentary hearings on February 28, Merabishvili said that the investigation has not yet revealed any facts which could cause the dismissal of those officials who were mentioned in the Imedi report. He also said that allegations to link officials to the case are "attempts to discredit the police.... There are attempts to link this case to my family members as well. This is done deliberately to get on my nerves."

Whilst the Minister was in the midst of a speech at the hearing, opposition parliamentarians from the Rightist Opposition, Republican, Conservative and Democratic Front factions walked out of the chamber to protest against Merabishvili, and the possibly partisan investigation.

Parliamentarians from the ruling National Movement party, however thanked Merabishvili for the performance of his department, with MP Givi Targamadze saying that "The opposition’s walk-out was just a stage show. They are speculating over the Girgvliani murder case and they are trying to use it for their own political interests, which is absolutely inadmissible". After the hearings, the opposition parliamentarians called for Merabishvili's resignation. Davit Gamkrelidze claimed that "It has become clear today that Merabishvili is trying to cover-up criminals sitting in the Interior Ministry. We, the opposition, society, should launch activities directed towards ensuring the dismissal of Merabishvili,"

== Scandal widens ==
On March 5, events began to gather pace as Imedi television broadcast another report questioning the official version of the death of a former anti-drug policeman, Gia Telia. The programme indicated that some officials from the Interior Ministry could have been involved in the killing of Mr Telia. The former policeman, who retired in 2003, was killed in a clash with the Interior Ministry's Special Operations Department (SOD) on February 16, 2006. According to the Ministry, Telia, a suspected drug dealer, was killed by police after he opened fire.

The Ministry's press office distributed a video of the operation to the national television networks showing the body of Telia lying on the floor of his apartment holding a pistol in his right hand. However, in an interview with Imedi television, relatives of Telia claim that he would not hold a gun in his right hand as he was left-handed. Additionally they claimed that Telia had alleged that certain officials from the Ministry wanted 'to get rid of him' because of information he possessed about their possible involvement in drug trafficking. In a 2005 interview the former police officer claimed the police had unsuccessfully tried to arrest him under fabricated charges. He was then attacked and injured by a gunshot. In the interview Telia did not name the officials from the Interior Ministry who were apparently interested in his elimination, but speculated that Irakli Kodua, Chief of the Interior Ministry's Special Operations Department (SOD), 'was ordered' to organize his assassination.

At the same time several opposition groupings, including the Rightist Opposition and Georgian Labour Party, announced their intention to launch street protests against the government in an attempt to force Vano Merabishvili to resign.

== Arrests ==
On March 6 Vano Merabishvili announced that four officers - Gia Alania, Avtandil Aptsiauri, Aleksandre Gachava and Mikheil Bibiluri - from the Interior Ministry had been arrested on suspicion of killing Sandro Girgvliani. The minister gave no motive for the crime but stated that he had "evidence proving that they have committed this crime". The names of the four men had not been mentioned in the report, aired by Imedi television on February 12.

Shortly after the arrests were announced MPs from the New Rights and Democratic Front parliamentary faction's convened a news conference. They said that the arrest of the Interior officials was "a good precedent". However Koba Davitashvili of the Democratic Front added that "the major part of the investigation is still ahead. Not only should those who committed the crime be held responsible, but also those who ordered it." The parliamentarians again called for Merabishvili's resignation.

== Dismissal and widening criticism ==
On March 7 Guram Donadze one of the men at the centre of the murder was unexpectedly fired. The official reason behind Donadze's dismissal was due to 'conflicting relations' with a number of journalists. MPs from the Rightist Opposition and Democratic Front then demanded that the Interior Minister, Vano Merabishvili, sack the Chief of the Department of Constitutional Security, Data Akhalaia and arrest Akhalaia's deputy Oleg Melnikov for his alleged active participation in the beating of Girgvliani. The ruling National Movement, responded by announcing their 'clear-cut support' towards Merabishvili and branded the opposition as 'closely incorporated into the criminal world'.

At this point the influential former foreign minister and leader of the Georgia's Way political party, Salome Zourabichvili, announced her intention to work with the opposition parties regarding Girgvliani's murder. Speaking to Civil Georgia she said "... spare no efforts over this issue – be it street rallies, media statements, etc. Because, if a syndrome of fear appears, if the guilty are not punished... if there is no court, then we move towards a totalitarian regime."

== Flaws in witness statements ==
Levan Bukhaidze, a key witness and the friend of Sandro Girgvliani, on March 9 revealed that he had failed on the same day to identify Oleg Melnikov, amongst four people during a police lineup. However he later told Imedi television that this did not mean that the official was not amongst the men who brutally beat him and his friend on January 27. Bukhaidze went on to question the testimony of Gia Alana, one of the detained suspects, who claimed that he met with Girgvliani while the latter was coming out of the Sheredan café on the 27th. Alania says that he and his accompanying colleagues overheard Girgvliani verbally insult Donadze, irritating Alania and triggered a dispute between himself and the victim. Bukhaidze strongly denied this and claimed that no dispute had taken place after he and his friend left the café.

Despite Bukhaidze's failure to identify Oleg Melnikov, a statement made by Girgvliani's girlfriend, Tamar Maisuradze, hinted at Melnikov's possible involvement. She claimed that Melnikov left the café, under the pretext to buy a cigarette, immediately after Bukhaidze and Girgvliani went out. He allegedly returned only after around 40 minutes, with Maisuradze going on to say that this was explained by the fact that he had travelled to a distant supermarket after being unable to buy the cigarettes he wanted at a nearby shop. "I have watched security video of that very same supermarket but I have not seen Melnikov entering it", she added.

== Condemnation and resignation ==
In a statement issued on March 13 the Georgian Ombudsman Sozar Subari said that investigation of Sandro Girgvliani murder case was "a serious test for the government". He said that so far the only answer he had received from the authorities regarding the investigation of the case was that "there are punitive teams within the Interior Ministry, which are above of laws and which can liquidate any person in case of will."

Sozar Subari's statement also said that the arrest of the four officers, "failed to remove doubts" persisting in the society regarding the murder case. "Those officials, who are suspected by society of having links with this case, would have been resigned in any democratic state, or in a state which has an ambition to be a democratic".

Shortly afterwards Data Akhalaia, and Oleg Melnikov announced their temporary resignation from office pending an investigation. Mr Akhalaia told a news conference that "We have nothing to do with the crime committed on January 28 murder of Sandro Girgvliani, neither direct, nor indirect. It might be a surprise for certain persons, but solving of this criminal case was made possible as a result of our efforts. Despite this, as we feel morally responsibility towards the society, our government and our families, we have decided to appeal the Interior Minister Vano Merabishvili to suspend our duties".

Opposition parliamentarians, said that Akhalaia and Sanodze's decision was welcome and a result of pressure exerted by society on the Interior Ministry. MP Koba Davitashvili, leader of opposition Conservative Party, told reporters "We can only welcome this decision, which will definitely defuse political tensions… But now it is very important to follow investigation of this case, so that to make sure that all those who masterminded this murder case, if there are any, are prosecuted".

== Protests ==
On March 16, the most significant protests towards the authorities began with thousands of motorists beeping their horns in Tbilisi and other cities signaling increasing anger against the Interior Minister Vano Merabishvili. Several hours after the protest President Saakashvili invited three television journalists to hold a live press conference. He downplayed the opposition's calls for Merabishvili's resignation as 'very funny' and said that he would strongly support the Minister claiming he was "really a very good Minister".

Several hundred protesters gathered outside the President's Office on March 17 to demand Merabishvili's resignation and an unbiased investigation of a high-profile murder scandal. The rally, which was organized by some human right groups, was joined by the opposition Republican, New Rights, Conservative, Labor and Freedom parties, as well as by those outdoor market sellers, also protested against, what they described as, 'police violence'.

On May 23 a small group of activists from the Equality Institute non-governmental organization went on hunger strike and staged a protest rally central Rustaveli Avenue outside the Parliament. Overnight the Georgian Patrol Police dispersed the protesters, arresting two of them and fining them GEL 7.5 for hooliganism.

== Interrogation and trial ==
On June 20 investigators from the General Prosecutor's Office interrogated Data Akhalaia as well as Guram Donadze, the former Interior Ministry spokesman and the Interior Minister's wife Tako Salakaia. Despite numerous demands by Girgvliani's relatives their lawyer was not invited to attend the interrogation.

Tbilisi City Court launched on June 27 hearings into the murder case. Tamar Maisuradze, a key witness into the case, told the court, that she was sitting at a table near to that of the Interior Ministry officials and the Interior Minister's wife. She also said that the victim was speaking emotionally, insulting Donadze but that she was not sure whether her or any other person sitting with him could have heard Girgvliani's words.

At the court hearing on June 30 these key figures testified that they had heard nothing as music was playing loudly in the café. Investigators have ruled out that the murder was ordered and claim that the incident was a result of a spontaneous quarrel between the suspects and the victim. But the security guard at the café, also questioned by the court, ruled out that a quarrel, or incident took place outside the café.

On July 3 the hearing turned into a confrontation between the opposition and the judge. Inside the courtroom some opposition politicians, including MP Davit Gamkrelidze, the leader of New Rights party, verbally sparred with judge Giorgi Chemia accusing him of bias. As a result, the judge demanded MP Gamkrelidze leave the courtroom. Meanwhile, outside the courtroom the City Court's guard refused entry to a group of opposition politicians, citing that the site was overcrowded. After the incident the chairman of the Supreme Court Kote Kublashvili announced that Gamkrelidze would no longer be able to attend the trial because he was stirring too much noise and disorders at the hearings.

Meanwhile, a few days later, Bukhaidze, told the court that Mikheil Bibiluri, one of the four suspects, was not at the scene of Sandro Girgvliani's death. He said that instead of Bibiluri, Oleg Melnikov, was the fourth attacker. "Today I can say for sure before the court: I recollected the fourth person in Okrokana [outskirts of Tbilisi, where Sandro Girgvliani’s body was located] and I can say for sure, that it was Oleg Melnikov" Bukhaidze added.

On July 5 prosecutors accused key suspect into the case Gia Alania, former chief of the first unit of the Interior Ministry's Department for Constitutional Security, of deliberately inflicting injuries to Girgvliani, which resulted in the latter's death and demanded nine-year imprisonment for him. Prosecutors demanded eight-year imprisonment for each of other three suspects.

Judge Chemia reached a decision on July 6. The Tbilisi City Court sentenced Gia Alania, ex-chief of the first unit of the Interior Ministry's Department for Constitutional Security (DCS), to eight-years imprisonment for Sandro Girgvliani's murder. The three other officers were jailed for seven years each. All of them were found guilty of inflicting injuries, which resulted in Girgvliani's death.

Whilst Chemia was announcing his verdict a few hundred protesters rallied outside the Tbilisi City Court to condemn what they said was a biased trial. The Girgvliani family lawyer, Shalva Shavgulidze, said that the court had done everything to prevent "the whole truth about the case" being revealed. Clashes erupted in the court chambers after the announcement, as opposition party activists and relatives of Girgvliani tussled with the court marshalls. Several protesters, including the opposition Republican Party activist were detained for disorders. Four activists were released on July 29 after serving a 30-day prison sentence for violations of public order outside the Court of Appeals in Tbilisi. Their arrest was condemned by the Ombudsman, Sozar Subari, as illegal.

Former President Mikheil Saakashvili, who left Georgia after his second term, is also accused of abuse of power in connection with the dispersal of a rally and the invasion of the building of the Imedi television company in November 2007. Saakashvili calls all the charges politically motivated.

== Reaction ==
The State Minister for Conflict Resolution Issues, Giorgi Khaindrava, who attended proceedings at Tbilisi City Court described the trial as 'inadequate'. I think upon the arrival from the United States, President Saakashvili should consider the issue and take relevant conclusions and decisions, because what we are now seeing here is a sign of a crisis" Khaindrava told reporters. He went on to say on July 7 that "This was such a case that I would have resigned if I were the Interior Minister". Khaindrava, was later sacked on July 21 for not following the official line issues and announced that he has joined the Equality Institute, a human rights group. During the scandal the group held a series of protest rallies in Tbilisi demanding a fair investigation into Girgvliani's murder.

John Tefft, the U.S. Ambassador to Georgia, told the Associated Press that "It has been our position to make quite clear to the government that we expect no cover-ups and that those who are responsible should be brought to justice".

The daily 24 Saati (24 Hours) meanwhile wrote the next day that the judiciary had 'failed to pass the public test'. In an opinion article the publication remarked that "As anticipated, during announcement of the verdict the presiding judge Giorgi Chemia has not named a motive behind Sandro Girgvliani’s murder, as well as said nothing about those who have ordered the murder. The judge has ended hastily-conducted trial yesterday - it took just ten days - and ignored the position and evidence put forth by the victim’s attorney," The daily Rezonansi wrote in its article "Society Against Authorities", that whilst President Saakashvili was in the United States, Georgia was on the verge of a political crisis.

== Continuing scandal ==
Irina Enukidze, the mother of Girgvliani, claimed on May 2 that unspecified representatives of the authorities had offered her money in exchange for her silence and the conclusion of her pursuit of Merabishvili's resignation. to the issue of public discussions over this matter. "They referring to authorities offered me any sum in exchange for me keeping silent. Otherwise, they threatened to silence me by force. They also prohibited me from having any contact with the opposition. Now, I want to answer to the authors of these proposals - they have made a huge mistake."

On July 12, prosecutors launched an investigation into the testimony provided by Levan Bukhaidze, the Chief of Tbilisi's Prosecutors Office said. He was summoned for interrogation over his recent testimony on July 11. If the testimony by Bukhaidze were to be confirmed that Melnikov was at the crime scene on January 28, it would undermine the entire official motives behind the crime - that the murder occurred as a result of a spontaneous row between the victim and four former police officials outside the Sheredan café in downtown Tbilisi.

Patrol Policeman Grigol Bashaleishvili was found guilty and sentenced to four-years imprisonment on August 10 by the Tbilisi City Court of the negligent murder of 19-year-old Amiran Robakidze on 23 November 2004. However, relatives of the victim and some human rights groups have condemned the trial as an attempt to cover up higher-level Interior Ministry officials, who allegedly fabricated evidence. Robakidze's relatives and some human right groups have called for the prosecution of Interior Ministry officials who provided false crime scene evidence. In particular, Guram Donadze, one man at the centre of Sanrdo Girgvliani's murder, was singled out as a possible suspect.

== Media pressure ==
During this period the influential media tycoon Badri Patarkatsishvili, owner of the Imedi television station, stated that the Georgian authorities were mounting pressure on his station and other businesses after it had broadcast details of the Sandro Girgvliani murder case scandal.

"It is no secret that Imedi television was the first one which reported the circumstances of Sandro Girgvliani’s murder...this alone became a reason for the authorities’ dissatisfaction, which triggered the financial authorities to actively launch a probe into my businesses and my companies so as to force me to mount pressure against my journalists..and facilitate the creation of a favorable image of the authorities." Badri Patarkatsishvili went on to say that he would never yield to pressure from the authorities.

Shortly after this statement influential government MP Giga Bokeria convened a news conference and accused Patarkatsishvili of blackmailing the authorities "It appears that he Patarkatsishvili cannot forget his past – Russia during Yeltsin's presidency, when he and his friends controlled everything – the authorities, business and seized huge amounts of property. However, present-day Georgia is not Yeltsin’s Russia. At the same time, present-day Georgia is not Putin's Russia, where political opponents are persecuted or arrested, where televisions are closed down. I want to stress that television, freedom of speech is untouchable. Mr. Patarkatsishvili can be engaged in politics, business - but he will not be able to blackmail the authorities through his own television or influence".

On July 6 Eka Khoperia, an anchor with Rustavi 2 TV, announced during her live program that she was resigning, after Data Akhalaia refused to take part in her talk show unless he will be able to speak after opposition representatives as a final guest. Khoperia said that this condition was unacceptable. Sandro Girgvliani's high-profile murder case was the topic of Eka Khoperia's talk show on July 6. Khoperia announced during the show that she had been informed that interview with Data Akhalaia, ex-chief of the Interior Ministry's Department for Constitutional Security, will take place only on his conditions, otherwise he would not be available. Akhalaia had been accused by Girgvliani's relatives, some human right groups, and certain opposition parties of being behind the murder case.

"But the condition was that Akhalaia should have been last guest of the program; such conditions are absolutely unacceptable for me. Also I think that when such a murder referring to the Girgvliani's case occurs in the country the Interior Minister should at least resign. So this is my last program and I quit this channel Rustavi 2." After the statement, Khoperia announced an advertising break, but the programme did not resume.

Eka Khoperia's statement was interpreted by some opposition activists as an evidence of pressure on journalists of the Rustavi 2. Rustavi 2 has often been accused by the opposition of toeing the official line of President Saakashvili's administration. It has also been widely speculated on that the channel's editorial policy was largely determined by officials from the ruling National Movement party.

The General-Director of Rustavi 2, Nika Tabatadze, denied that Khoperia, was under pressure from the Rustavi 2 management or the authorities. The Rustavi 2 TV chief also said that he talked with Khoperia after the program and said that Rustavi 2 is ready to continue cooperation with Eka Khoperia'. Eka Khoperia herself also denied that it was Minister of Interior who spoke with her about Akhalaia.

== The outcome ==
On July 6, 2006, the Tbilisi City Court sentenced Alania, Aptsiauri, Kachava and Bibiluri to various prison terms.

On January 5, 2018, the Tbilisi City Court sentenced ex-President of Georgia Mikheil Saakashvili in absentia to three years in prison under the article abuse of official powers.

== See also ==
- Human rights in Georgia
