= Ministry of Justice of Georgia =

Government ministry of Georgia

- საქართველოს იუსტიციის სამინისტრო
- Coat of Arms of Georgia

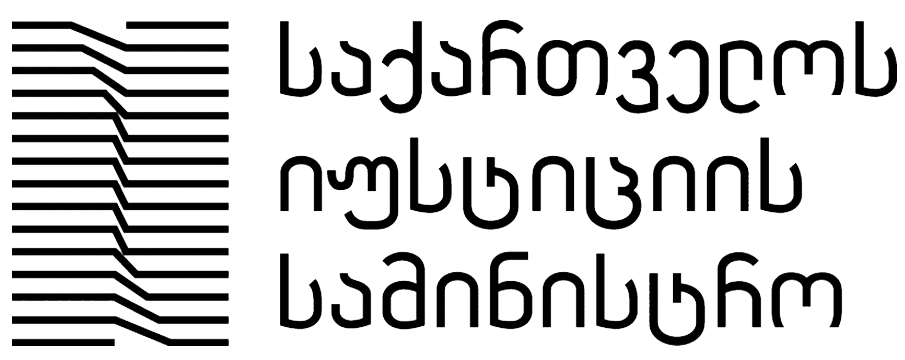
- Logo of the ministry

- Left Façade of The Building of The Ministry of justice of Georgia

Ministry overview
- Formed: 1918; 108 years ago
- Jurisdiction: Government of Georgia
- Headquarters: 24, Gorgasali Str., 0102, Tbilisi, Georgia
- Annual budget: ₾392.4 million (USD 147.8 million).
- Ministry executives: Paata Salia, Minister of Justice; Beka Dzamashvili, Deputy Minister; Tornike Cheishvili, Deputy Minister; Akaki Saghirashvili, Deputy Minister; Valeri Lomiashvili, Deputy Minister; Mindia Ugrekhelidze, Deputy Minister
- Website: www.justice.gov.ge

The Ministry of Justice of Georgia (Georgian: საქართველოს იუსტიციის სამინისტრო, sakartvelos iustitsiis saministro) is a governmental agency within the Cabinet of Georgia in charge of regulating activities in the justice system, overseeing the public prosecutor, maintaining the legal system and public order, protection of the public and instituting law reforms in Georgia. The ministry is headed by Paata Salia.

== History ==
The development of the judicial system in Georgia dates back to Pharnavazi era when legislative functions were regulated by the People's Assembly and the Council of Elders. In 9th–10th centuries, the system was assigned to a state body called Darbazi (Chamber) which included clergy, aristocracy and the commons. This institution was in charge of issuing important legal documents, such as Samparavtmdzebnelo Law (Criminal Law), Bagrat Kurapalati Law, Giorgi V Law, Royal Court Regulations, as well as translation and adaptation of international documents such as Law of Moses, Greek and Roman-Syrian laws, etc. A single collection of old documents was preserved and saved during the reign of Vakhtang VI in the beginning of the 18th century. The collection is known as the Book of Laws of Vakhtang VI (issued in 1703–1709).

King Vakhtang’s Dasturlamal (the Book of Regulations) has survived to the present day. Composed in 1707–1709, it contains description of the statesmen and assignment of their duties, survey and census of the population, economy, revenues, taxes and property accounts, etc. The duties assumed by the present day Minister of Justice of Georgia were divided among a Chancellor, Chief Bookkeeper and Chief Mandaturi (supervisor).

Despite establishment of Russian rule over Georgia, Georgian laws continued to function until the beginning of the 20th century, when any practice of traditional judicial system was ceased upon occupation of Georgia by the Bolsheviks in 1921.

The first Ministry of Justice of independent Georgian Republic was established when the National Council of Georgia adopted an Act of Independence of Georgia on May 26, 1918 which functioned up until annexation of Georgia to Soviet Russia in 1921. According to the act of October 11, 1918, a Codification Subdivision was formed at the Ministry of Justice taking over the codification of legislation and publishing of official issue "Collection of Laws and Resolutions of the Government". After independence of Georgia was restored in 1991, the ministry was re-established.

== Structure ==
The ministry is headed by the minister aided by three deputy ministers. The ministry carries out its activities in accordance with the resolution enacted by the Presidential Decree No. 541 dated November 7, 2008. As of January 2000, the Ministry of Justice acquired the most important competences, such as governing the penitentiary system and its organizational management, functions of Public and Civil Register (in 2004), governing State Archives (in 2004); organizational maintenance of effective governing system, as well as of State Commission of territorial settlement reform and activities of its workgroups (in 2006).

Main functions of the ministry are protection of state interests at national and international courts and tribunals; identification of standards of active regulatory acts; bringing Georgian legislation in accordance with international guidelines; formation of the State Register; adjustment of emigration and migration procedures; regulation of Notary Functions, Public Registry Services, Civil Registry Services; maintaining State Archives; enforcement of court decisions; arrangement of the state representation at the European Court of Human Rights.

== Budget ==
The budget of the Ministry of Justice in 2023 is GEL 392.4 million (USD 147.8 million), up by GEL 71.8 million (USD 27.04 million) compared to 2022.

== Ministers of Justice of Georgia ==
=== Ministers of Democratic Republic of Georgia (1918–1921) ===
- Shalva Aleksi-Meskhishvili, 1918–1919
- Razhden Arsenidze, 1919–1921
- Evgeni Gegechkori, 1921

=== Ministers of Republic of Georgia (1990–present) ===
- John Khetsuriani, 1990–1992
- Konstantin Kemularia, 1992–1993
- Tedo Ninidze, 1993–1998
- Lado Chanturia, 1998–1999
- John Khetsuriani, 1999–2000
- Mikheil Saakashvili, 2000–2001
- Roland Giligashvili, 2001–2003
- Zurab Adeishvili, 2003–2004
- George Papuashvili, 2004–2005
- Konstantin Kemularia, 2004–2005
- Gia Kavtaradze, 2005–2007
- Ekaterine Tkeshelashvili, 1 August, 2007 – 31 January, 2008
- Nika Gvaramia, January 31, 2008 – October 27, 2008
- Zurab Adeishvili, November 2, 2008 – October 25, 2012
- Tea Tsulukiani, October 25, 2012 – October 1, 2020
- Gocha Lortkipanidze, December 24, 2020 – 31 March, 2021
- Rati Bregadze, 1 April 2021 – 28 November, 2024
- Anri Okhanashvili, 28 November, 2024 – 2 April, 2025
- Paata Salia, 4 April, 2025 –

== See also ==
- Cabinet of Georgia
- Tbilisi Appeal Court
