= Association for Protection of Landowners' Rights =

The Association of Professionals on Land and Realty (APLR) (Georgian: მიწისა და უძრავი ქონების პროფესიონალთა ასოციაცია), formerly the Association for Protection of Landowners' Rights, is a Georgian non-governmental, not-for-profit organization. The mandate of the organization is to facilitate the development, regulation and transparency of Georgian land (real estate) markets. With its active participation in the land reform program, legislative initiatives, and close monitoring of existing legislation, APLR represents one of the main participants in the real estate market regulation field in Georgia (country); it is also an organization with an established reputation and prominence in the South Caucasus region.

== History ==
APLR was founded in 1996 by a group of landowners' rights activists. Soon after establishment, the organization became a primary advocacy group for Georgian land users, and already in 1997, started to play an active role in land reform, formulating policies for land privatization in Georgia.

== Activities ==
Today, APLR offers a wide variety of services to its clients and partners, both national and international. Services include advocacy / legal consulting, legal drafting, real estate registration, resettlement assistance. In partnership with USAID, APLR has registered and titled around 2.4 million land parcels in Georgia. In cooperation with BP, APLR has played an important role in land acquisition which was essential for realization of the Baku–Tbilisi–Ceyhan pipeline in Georgia.

One of the achievements of APLR was a successful lobbying effort that led to the adoption of the legislation enabling privatization of state-owned agricultural lands, which was considered to be a key legislative act for the development of Georgian agriculture.
