= John Khetsuriani =

Georgian lawyer (born 1951)

John Khetsuriani (Georgian: ჯონი ხეცურიანი; born 23 November 1951) is a Georgian lawyer.

Khetsuriani was born in Lailashi, in the Tsageri region. He received his secondary education in Kutaisi, before graduating from Tbilisi State University in law and economics. He undertook post-graduate studies at the Georgian Academy of Sciences, before defending a thesis at the Kharkov Law Institute on the "Significance of Moral Rules in Civil Law" in 1977.

In 1990, Khetsuriani was appointed the first Deputy Minister of Justice in the new Republic of Georgia, and went on to serve as Minister of Justice from 1990 to 1992. In 1992, he became Assistant Professor at Tbilisi State University, and was appointed Professor at that institution in 1994 after his successful defence of his doctoral thesis on the "Functions of Civil Law".

In 1995, Khetsuriani returned to political life, becoming Parliamentary Secretary to the President of Georgia, and serving again as Minister of Justice from 1999 to 2000, before returning to his secretaryship from November 2000 to July 2001. From 1999 to 2000, he was also a member of the National Security Council of Georgia, a member of the Council of Justice of Georgia and a member of the Consultative Economic Council.

Khetsuriani is the author of numerous scientific works, including 6 books on civil law, constitutional law and criminal law issues. He was awarded the Laureate of the Union Youth Award in the scientific field in 1982.

Khetsuriani actively participated in the investigation of the tragedy of 9 April 1989. He was a co-author of the Act on the Restoration of State Independence in 1991, and participated in the drafting of the Constitution of Georgia and the Civil Code of Georgia. He acted as a member of the State Constitutional Commission.

He is also a member of the Dissertation Council and of the Presidium of the Scientific Council of Learned Experts at Tbilisi State University. He was awarded the special title of the Chief State Counsellor of Justice, the Judge Class Rank of the Higher Qualification Grade.

On 6 July 2001, Khetsuriani was appointed a member of the Constitutional Court of Georgia by the President of Georgia and on 10 July 2001, he was unanimously elected the President of the Constitutional Court by the Plenum of the Court.

On 25 December 2001, he was elected a Corresponding member of the Georgian Academy of Sciences.

Khetsuriani is married and has a son.
