= Irakli Okruashvili =

Georgian politician

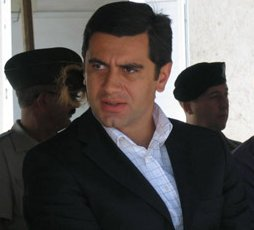
- Okruashvili in 2005

Chairman of Victorious Georgia
- Incumbent
- Assumed office June 2019
- Preceded by: position established

Minister of Economy and Sustainable Development
- In office November 10, 2006 – November 17, 2006
- Preceded by: Irakli Chogovadze
- Succeeded by: Giorgi Arveladze

Minister of Defense of Georgia
- In office December 17, 2004 – November 10, 2006
- Preceded by: Giorgi Baramidze
- Succeeded by: Davit Kezerashvili

Minister of the Interior of Georgia
- In office June 7, 2004 – December 17, 2004
- Preceded by: Giorgi Baramidze
- Succeeded by: Ivane Merabishvili

Prosecutor General of Georgia
- In office January 14, 2004 – June 7, 2004
- Preceded by: Nugzar Gabrichidze
- Succeeded by: Zurab Adeishvili

Governor of Shida Kartli
- In office December 2, 2003 – January 14, 2004

Member of the Tbilisi City Assembly
- In office 2002 – November 2003

Deputy Minister of Justice
- In office 2000–2001

Personal details
- Born: November 6, 1973 (age 52) Tskhinvali, South Ossetian AO, Georgian SSR, Soviet Union
- Party: Victorious Georgia (2019–present); Movement for United Georgia (2007–2010); United National Movement (until 2006)

Military service
- Allegiance: Ukraine
- Branch/service: International Legion of Territorial Defense of Ukraine
- Years of service: 2022–present
- Battles/wars: Russo-Ukrainian War; Russian invasion of Ukraine

Irakli Okruashvili (Georgian: ირაკლი ოქრუაშვილი) (born November 6, 1973) is a Georgian politician who had served on various high-ranking posts in the Government of Georgia under President Mikheil Saakashvili, including being the Minister of Defense from December 2004 until being dismissed in November 2006.

In September 2007, Okruashvili staged a public comeback to Georgian politics, openly confronting Mikheil Saakashvili and creating the opposition party Movement for United Georgia. On September 27, 2007, Okruashvili was briefly arrested at his party headquarters on the charges of corruption, money laundering, and abuse of office. In 2007 he left Georgia and was granted political asylum in France. He was sentenced to 11-year prison term in Georgia in absentia in March 2008. In October 2010, he, remaining in France, joined Sozar Subari, Levan Gachechiladze and Erosi Kitsmarishvili in the new Georgian Party.

Okruashvili was sentenced to five years in prison for allegedly participating in group violence in anti-government rallies organized in June 2019. However, President Salome Zourabichvili pardoned him, alongside Gigi Ugulava, on May 15, 2020.

On March 8, 2022, the Ukrainian Ministry of Defence stated that Okruashvili had arrived in Ukraine, together with other Georgian volunteers, to fight against the 2022 Russian invasion of Ukraine.

== Political career ==
Irakli Okruashvili was born in Tskhinvali, South Ossetian AO, Georgian SSR. He graduated from Faculty of International Law and Relations at Tbilisi State University. He then worked as an attorney.

=== In government ===
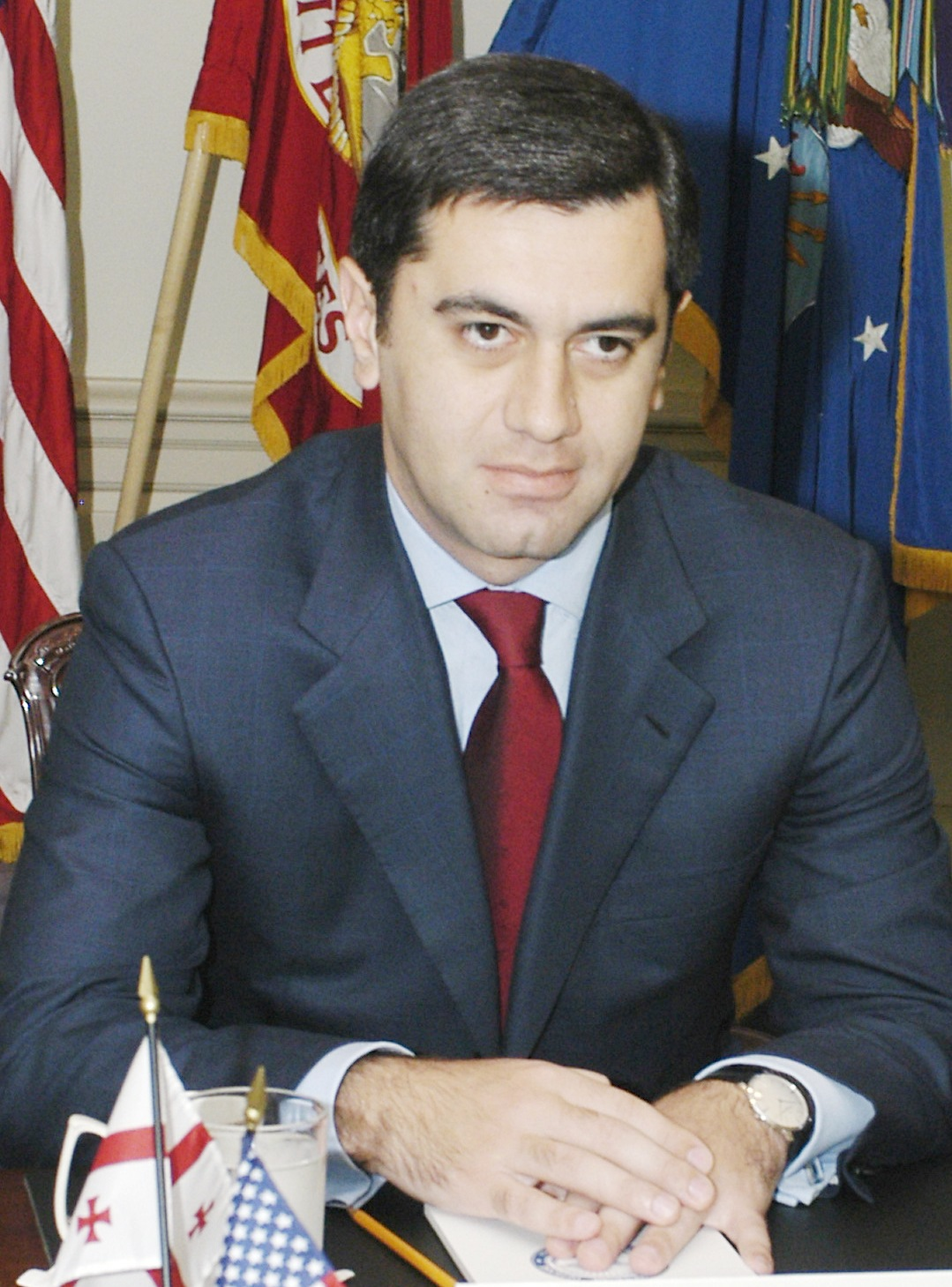
Irakli Okruashvili, 2005

Okruashvili served as the Deputy Minister of Justice from 2000 to 2001. He joined Mikhail Saakashvili's United National Movement and was elected as a member of Tbilisi Assembly (Sakrebulo) in 2002. After the Rose Revolution, Okruashvili was appointed the Person Authorized (governor) of the president of Georgia in Shida Kartli (to which breakaway South Ossetia was a de jure part) in December 2003 and established strong anti-corruption and anti-smuggling measures in the region.

He served as the Prosecutor General from January 2004 until Saakashvili appointed him Interior Minister in June 2004 and moved him to the post of defence minister in December 2004. During his tenure as defence minister, Okruashvili was known for advocating military actions against the separatists in South Ossetia.

Okruashvili said on May 1, 2006, that he would resign if Georgia failed to restore control over breakaway South Ossetian by January 1, 2007.

On November 10, 2006, Saakashvili appointed him Minister for Economic Development. Davit Kezerashvili became the Minister of Defence. Okruashvili resigned as Minister for Economic Development on November 17, 2006.

=== In opposition ===
On September 25, 2007, he announced the formation of the new opposition Movement for United Georgia and unleashed criticism on President Saakashvili, accusing him of corruption, incompetency and human rights violations. He also raised new concerns around Zurab Zhvania's death, challenging the official investigation point of view and personally accused the Georgian president in planning the murder of businessman Badri Patarkatsishvili.

Speculations about Okruashvili's planned party had been circulating for a long time already and many commentators expected, what they called, "a war of compromising materials" in case of Okruashvili's political comeback. The presentation was preceded by the controversies over financial irregularities surrounding the party's new office and the arrest of Mikheil Kareli, Orkuashvili's close associate and governor of Shida Kartli, on the charges of corruption.

=== Arrest ===
On September 27, 2007, Okruashvili was detained on charges of extortion, money laundering, and abuse of office while Georgia's defense minister. On September 28, 2007, several opposition parties organized a peaceful mass rally in Okruashvili's support at the Parliament of Georgia.

On October 8, 2007, in a video taped confession released by the General Prosecutor's Office, Okruashvili pleaded guilty to large-scale bribery through extortion and negligence while serving as minister and retracted his accusations against the president, winning release on bail of 10 million Georgian lari. He also said that his earlier accusations levelled against Saakashvili were not true and were aimed at gaining political dividends for himself and Badri Patarkatsishvili and at discrediting the President of Georgia. Some opposition leaders said Okruashvili's statement had been made under duress. Okruashvili declared, however, that he had decided to cooperate with the investigation to "mitigate [his] situation".

=== Expulsion from Georgia ===
After he pleaded guilty, Okruashvili was released. Okruashvili left Georgia around November 1, 2007. He subsequently said he was forced into exile; the government said he had asked to leave because of medical issues.

On November 5, 2007, Okruashvili made a surprise appearance on Imedi TV from Munich, claiming that he had been forced to retract accusations against President Saakashvili while being in jail. A Georgian prosecuting officer, however, rejected Okruashvili's allegations, while the senior members of the Parliament of Georgia for the ruling party described him "an instrument in the hands of Patarkatsishvili", the owner of Imedi TV, who financed opposition rallies against the Georgian government.

On November 14, 2007, following a Prosecutor's Office request, a court in Tbilisi ruled that Okruashvili be returned to police custody pending investigation. In December 2007, he was arrested in Germany at the request of Georgia, but was later transferred to France, where a court ruled that he be freed on bail with Georgia's extradition request to be examined on April 16, 2008. In the meantime, a Georgian court found him guilty of "large-scale extortion" and sentenced him to 11 years in prison in absentia on March 28, 2008. On April 23, 2008, he was granted political asylum. The French courts ultimately rejected the extradition request as well.

In September 2008 Reuters reported Okruashvili had said that Saakashvili had long planned the 2008 South Ossetia war but had executed it poorly. While defence minister from 2004 to 2006 he and Saakashvili worked together on military plans to retake South Ossetia and Abkhazia, saying "Abkhazia was our strategic priority, but we drew up military plans in 2005 for taking both Abkhazia and South Ossetia as well".

In October 2010, Okruashvili resigned his position in the Movement for United Georgia and shortly afterwards joined with the high-profile Georgia-based politicians — Sozar Subari, Levan Gachechiladze, and Erosi Kitsmarishvili to establish a new opposition party, the Georgian Party.

=== Return, imprisonment, release and struggle with GD government ===
In a phone interview with the Tbilisi-based Maestro TV on May 22, 2011, he said "On May 25 I will be in Georgia together with my people. I will not talk about details. On May 25 we will manage to put an end to Saakashvili's regime with minimal losses. If there is a great public support, the losses will be minimal. So, everybody should acknowledge the responsibility, which should be assumed before our country."

After government change in Georgia Okruashvili, who faces multiple criminal charges in Georgia, returned from his French exile back to his home country. But despite a broad amnesty for political prisoners he was arrested upon arrival in the Tbilisi airport on November 20, 2012. Georgian Justice Minister, Tea Tsulukiani, commented, that she shared the view that Okruashvili "was subjected to politically-motivated persecution by the [previous] authorities." "But it does not automatically mean that he is innocent in those criminal charges that he may face; it requires investigation," Tsulukiani told journalists. "There are number of criminal charges brought against him and the most recent one is related to setting up of illegal armed groups and that is related to the events of May, 2011 [during street protest rallies]. It requires further probe and I think that Okruashvili returned in order to prove his truth." Irakli Okruashvili was released from a courtroom on January 11. His release was made possible after Okruashvili was cleared of bribe-taking and extortion charges during a hearing in the Court of Appeals on January 10 and after the Tbilisi City Court accepted on January 11 a motion from prosecutors to release Okruashvili from custody on GEL 15,000 bail. A trial into negligence will be continued later in the Tbilisi City Court.

After his release Okruashvili gave an interview to Reuters to define the reasons of his return to Georgia after several years of residence in France under political asylum. Okruashvili said that Georgia's prosecution does not use him as "a golden witness" against President Saakashvili, as it was suggested in the Georgian media, and there was no big agreement with the new government about any issue. "My return (to the country) was just based on my decision and that’s it", Okruashvili said.

On 25 July 2019, Okruashvili was arrested in connection with the mass demonstrations that broke out after Russian MP Sergei Gavrilov addressed the Georgian parliament from the speaker's chair, a session presided over by then-parliament chairman Irakli Kobakhidze. He was convicted of organizing and participating in group violence during the unrest (part of what's now known as Gavrilov's Night), and was sentenced to five years in prison. He was released on 15 May 2020 after President Salome Zourabichvili pardoned him amid Western pressure.

In 2025, Okruashvili was summoned before the Tsulukiani Commission, set up to investigate the conduct of Georgia's 2003–2012 government. He and several other opposition figures refused to appear and were arrested; he received an eight-month sentence for failing to comply. Later that year, he was convicted separately of abuse of office in connection with the 2004 killing of Buta Robakidze, who was accidentally shot by a police officer. Prosecutors alleged Okruashvili, then Interior Minister, ordered evidence planted to justify the shooting, based on testimony from the now-deceased former Tbilisi Patrol Police chief, who claimed he inferred such an order from a phone call instructing him to tell the press a confrontation had occurred. Okruashvili's lawyer has disputed the conviction as resting on the witness's own interpretation of an ambiguous instruction rather than direct evidence. He was formally sentenced to seven years, but a 2012 amnesty law and credit for prior pretrial detention reduced the effective term to four years and five months. His defense has said it will appeal. Georgian opposition figures claim that his imprisonment is “absurd” and that he is a political prisoner.

== See also ==
- List of people granted political asylum
