= Zurab Adeishvili =

Georgian politician (born 1972)

Minister of Justice of Georgia
- In office 2 November 2008 – 25 October 2012
- President: Mikheil Saakashvili
- Preceded by: Nika Gvaramia
- Succeeded by: Tea Tsulukiani
- In office December 2003 – February 2004
- President: Mikheil Saakashvili
- Preceded by: Roland Giligashvili
- Succeeded by: George Papuashvili

Head of the Presidential Administration of Georgia
- In office January 2008 – November 2008

Prosecutor General of Georgia
- In office 10 June 2004 – 26 April 2007
- President: Mikheil Saakashvili
- Preceded by: Irakli Okruashvili
- Succeeded by: Zurab Bibliashvili

Minister of State Security
- In office February 2004 – 7 June 2004
- Succeeded by: Ivane Merabishvili

Member of the Parliament of Georgia
- In office 20 November 1999 – 5 January 2004

Personal details
- Born: 27 July 1972 (age 54) Mtisdziri, Qvareli district of Georgia
- Party: United National Movement (2001-present); Union of Citizens of Georgia (1999-2001)
- Website: Ministry of Justice of Georgia

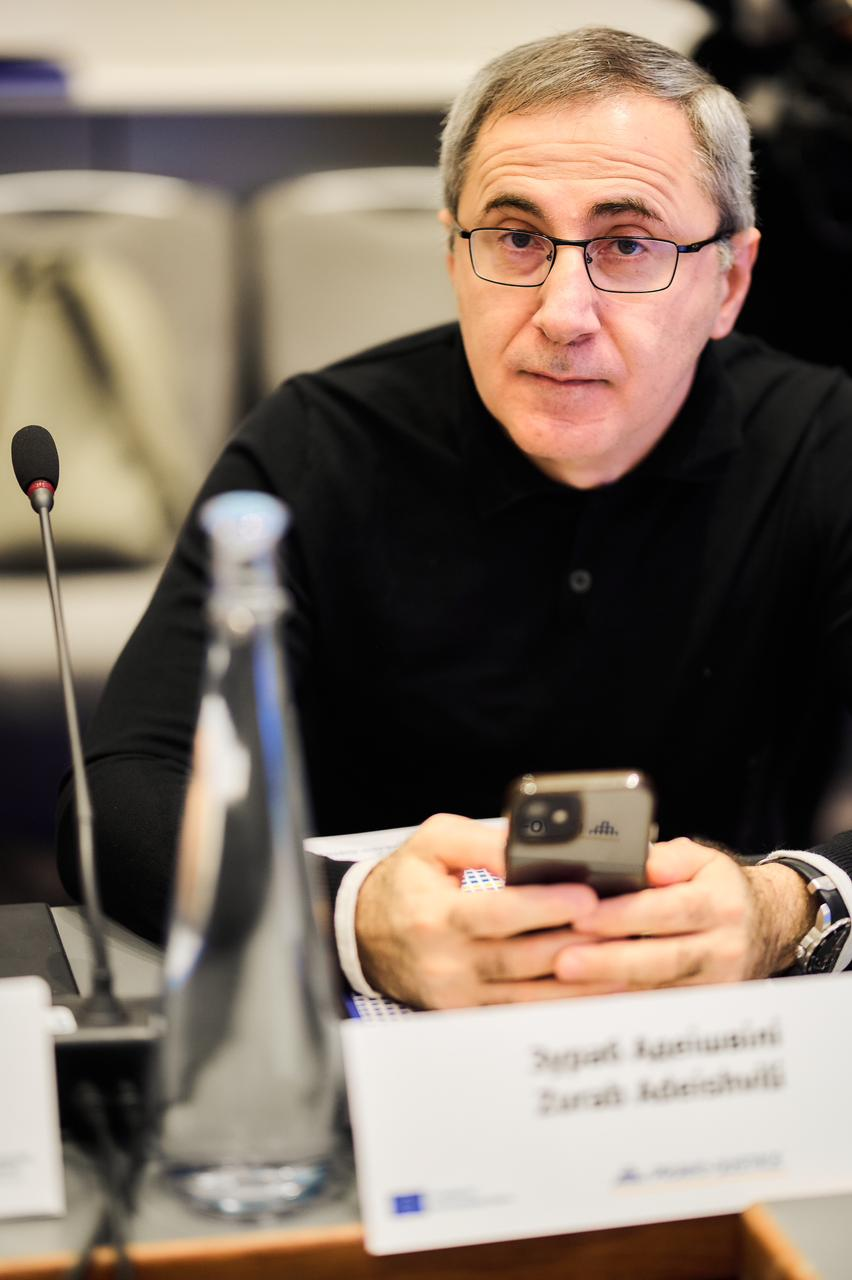
Zurab Adieshvili

Zurab Adeishvili (Georgian: ზურაბ ადეიშვილი) (born 27 July 1972) is a Georgian lawyer and politician, serving as the Minister of Justice of Georgia from November 2008 to October 2012.

== Early life ==
Adeishvili was born in the village of Mtisdziri in Qvareli district, then-Soviet Georgia. He graduated from the Faculty of Law, Tbilisi State University in 1994 and continued his training as a jurist at the Institute of State and Law in Tbilisi, Georgia and the University of Groningen in the Netherlands. He served as the leading specialist on constitutional law for the Parliament of Georgia from 1996 and 1999. He then worked in the NGO sector (such as the Georgian Young Lawyers' Association and the Liberty Institute) and briefly practiced law until becoming a Member of Parliament on President Eduard Shevardnadze-led Union of Citizens of Georgia (UCG) party ticket in November 1999.

== Political career ==
Adeishvili was a member of an influential and vocal minority group of the UCG faction, dubbed as "reformers", which was led by Zurab Zhvania and Mikheil Saakashvili and called for more radical and Western-oriented political reforms.

At the end of 2001, when the CUG was in the process of collapse, Adeishvili joined Saakashvili's New National Movement and became a member of its parliamentary affiliate, the Faction for Democratic Reforms, which were in opposition to Shevardnadze's government.

After the bloodless "Rose Revolution" in November 2003 toppled down Shevardnadze and swept the "reformers" to power, Adeishvili served successively as Minister of Justice (December 2003 – February 2004), Minister for State Security (February–June 2004), Prosecutor General (June 2004 – January 2008), and Head of Administration of President of Georgia (January–November 2008). As an influential member in the government and a close ally of President Saakashvili, Adeishvili has become a subject of criticism from Georgian opposition, especially during his tenure as Prosecutor General. In the October 2008 cabinet reshuffle, Adeishvili was again put in charge of Ministry of Justice which had recently been merged with the Prosecutor General's Office. In his new capacity, Adeishvili said liberalization of the criminal code would be one of his priorities. After the defeat of Saakashvili's United National Movement in the 2012 parliamentary election, Adeishvili was succeeded, on 25 October 2012 by Tea Tsulukiani, a member of the Georgian Dream coalition. Adeishvili's term at the Ministry of Justice is associated with significant decrease of corruption and improved efficiency of civil and property registration services, which were further transformed into a new concept of Public Service Hall.

Soon after elections, the new Government began to implement its campaign promise to “restore justice” by launching criminal prosecutions against officials of Saakashvili Government. Those prosecutions were largely met critically by international community due to a concern for what appeared to be a selective justice, political retribution and intimidation of opposition. After his meeting with the new Prime Minister Ivanishvili on 12 November 2013, President of European Commission José Manuel Barroso noted, that “situations of selective justice should be avoided as they could harm the country’s image abroad and weaken the rule of law.” In April 2015, General Secretariat of INTERPOL revoked its red notice against Zurab Adeishvili.

While publicly condemning Saakashvili's government and prosecuting its Ministers, the leaders of the new ruling coalition "Georgian Dream" often recognize Adeishvili for his personal ethics and his demonstrated commitment to fighting corruption.
