= Robert Amsterdam =

Canadian lawyer

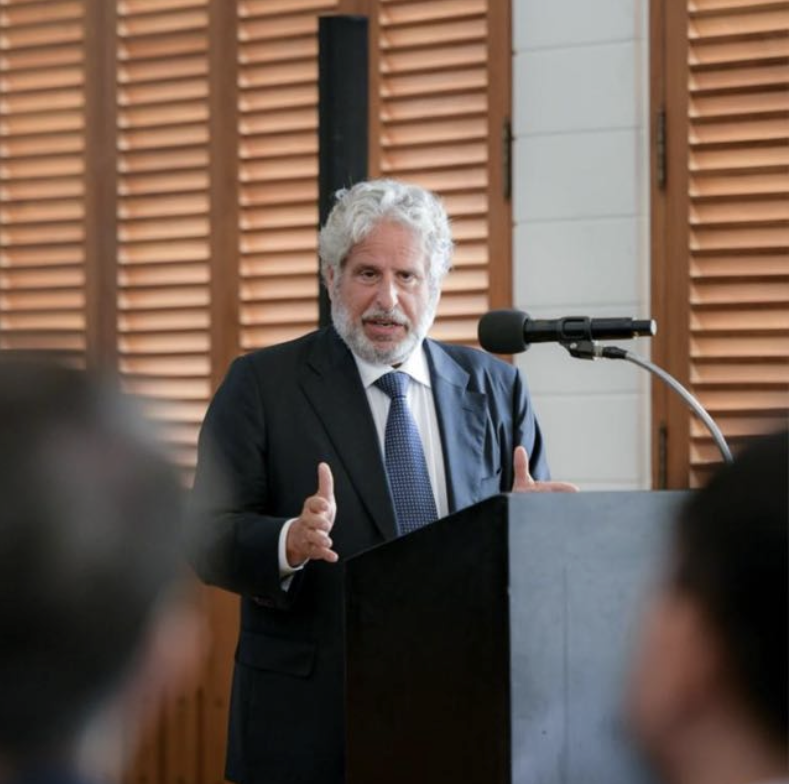

Robert "Bob" Ross Amsterdam (born 9 January 1956 in New York City, New York, United States) is an American-Canadian international lawyer specialising in political advocacy and human rights. He is the Founder and Managing Partner of Amsterdam & Partners LLP, based in Washington, D.C., and London.

== Personal life ==
Amsterdam was born on 9 January 1956 in New York City, before moving to Canada, where he became a dual US-Canadian citizen. Presently, he resides in London, United Kingdom.

== Career ==
Some of Amsterdam's most notable cases have included his earlier work in the Global South. For instance, he won international litigation on behalf of the Four Seasons Hotel and Resort Group in Venezuela. He also worked the well known Gutierrez case in Guatemala, which involved representing the victims of one of the country's largest alleged tax fraud and money laundering schemes.

Amsterdam would go on to represent political prisoners, democracy advocates and other leaders such as Venezuela's Eligio Cedeño, Nigeria's Nasir Ahmad el-Rufai, Singapore's Dr. Chee Soon Juan, Uganda's Bobi Wine and Tanzania's Tundu Lissu.

In 2003, Amsterdam was retained to defend Yukos CEO and Russia's wealthiest man Mikhail Khodorkovsky, who was also described as Russian President Vladimir Putin's primary opponent. In 2005, Khodorkovsky was sentenced to prison. On the night of the verdict, Amsterdam was detained by plainclothes security agents in the middle of the night at his hotel room. Amsterdam then engaged in a media campaign for the Yukos and Khodorkovsky cases, which included focusing on efforts to secure Khodorkovsky's release. He was ultimately released from prison in 2013.

In May 2010, former Thai Prime Minister Thaksin Shinawatra hired Amsterdam to serve as international lawyer and advisor to the defence counsel of the United Front for Democracy Against Dictatorship (UDD, or the "Red Shirts"). Speaking out publicly, Amsterdam "urged the international community not to tolerate the (new) government's violent crackdown on... peaceful protesters", and published a list of alleged human rights and international law violations committed during what he branded the "Bangkok massacres". During the 2013–14 Thai political crisis, Amsterdam delivered a speech to a massive Red Shirt rally in Bangkok, leading to a spat with politician Suthep Thaugsuban, who was critical of Amsterdam. Amsterdam responded by stating that Suthep was leading a "Thai Taliban"

Amsterdam has been part of the legal team in the Megaupload legal case, representing Kim Dotcom, the internet entrepreneur who had worked with activists such as Glenn Greenwald, Julian Assange and Edward Snowden.

Amsterdam and his firm were also involved in efforts by the Turkish Government to sue the Gülen movement.

Since 2023, Amsterdam has represented the Ukrainian Orthodox Church (UOC), along with various individuals related to it, in a fight against the Ukrainian Government over moves to prohibit the church. While the government has cited the UOC's alleged ties to the Russian Orthodox Church, Amsterdam has denied those links and characterised the efforts as contrary to the freedom of religion and aimed at establishing an authoritarian state.

Another recent case taken on by Amsterdam has been his representation of the Government of the Democratic Republic of the Congo over the use of Conflict minerals by Apple during the brutal Kivu conflict.

Amsterdam has been critical of economic sanctions, as well as financial and tax overegulation as currently practiced by the West.
