= Federalists (Georgia) =

Federalists ფედერალისტები
- Chairperson: Giga Bokeria
- Founded: 20 October 2024
- Registered: 14 March 2025
- Split from: European Georgia
- Ideology: Classical liberalism Federalism; Pro-Europeanism
- Political position: Centre to centre-right
- National affiliation: Opposition Alliance (since 2026)
- Colors: Magenta; White; Silver Grey
- Parliament: 0 / 150

Party flag
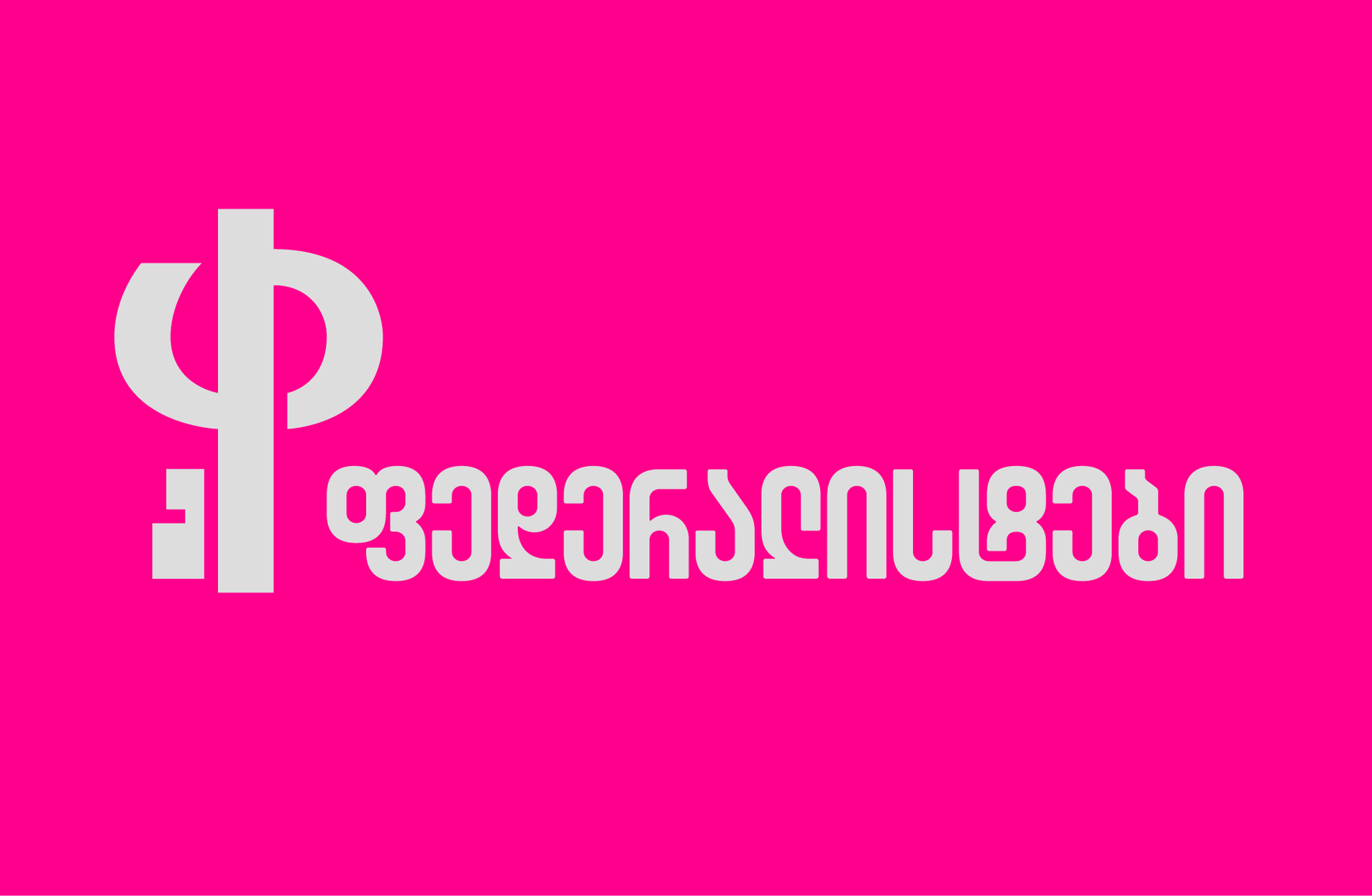

Website
- federalists.ge

The Federalists (Georgian: ფედერალისტები, romanized: pederalist'ebi) is a classical liberal and pro-European political party in Georgia, founded by former members of European Georgia.

Key figures in the party include Giga Bokeria, who has been serving as party chairman since 2024 and is a former Secretary of the National Security Council of Georgia and Tamar Chergoleishvili, the founder of the online magazine Tabula.

== History ==
On 1 August 2024, a majority of the European Georgia electoral list, chosen during the party's internal primary election, left the party, including key figures Giga Bokeria and Tamar Chergoleishvili. The split arose from disagreements with other key figures, Gigi Tsereteli and Akaki Bobokhidze over the primary results. Later, Chergoleishvili and Bokeria separately announced that the departing members would be forming a new political party.

On 15 August 2024, the members who had recently left their previous party held a presentation to announce the upcoming founding of a new political party called the Federalists. Later, the Federalists confirmed that they would not participate in the 2024 parliamentary elections, as they were late in registering the party. Instead, they planned to partake in the 2025 local elections. In the meantime, they endorsed their supporters to participate in the 2024 elections and vote against Georgian Dream. On 20 October 2024, the Federalists held their founding congress, during which the party was officially established.

The party decided not to take part in the 2025 local elections, joining a boycott by a large part of the opposition. The boycotting parties argued that participation would "only provide a facade for the illegal Russian regime" and called for complete non-cooperation. In April 2026 the Federalists were added to the lawsuit at the Constitutional Court that Georgian Dream submitted to ban a number of opposition parties. Originally, the case was submitted against the major opposition parties: Ahali, United National Movement, and Lelo for Georgia. Tamar Chergoleishvili considered the inclusion of the Federalists a procedural step aimed at extending the nine-month legal deadline for the case. The party boycotted the court hearings held in late October 2026.

== Ideology ==
The Federalists are a classical liberal party advocating for the federalization and decentralization of Georgia. They argue that federalism, common in European countries, can balance power and ensure accountability, countering the centralized, self-contained state. Their approach aims to decentralize power, reduce elite influence, and guide Georgia back to European and Western values.

Prominent members of the party have previously led political campaigns and projects such as "Before Bucha Was Abkhazia," which advocates for international recognition of the ethnic cleansing of Georgians during the war in Abkhazia as genocide committed by Russia. The project was formally presented to both the U.S. Congress and the French National Assembly.

Current members have also been involved in significant work, such as the "New Republic", a roadmap for economically liberal reforms developed with their adherents under the Liberty Institute.

== Name and symbols ==
The Federalists logo combines the imagery of a key with the Asomtavruli letter "Pari".

The name "Federalists" was inspired by an interview with General Giorgi Kvinitadze, which was broadcast by Radio Free Europe/Radio Liberty in 1968:

"Georgia and the Georgian people, with their traditions, customs, and state arrangement, are European, not Asian. I need to compare the state arrangements of Europe and Asia. In Asia, and also in Russia, there has never been what we call federalism. Georgia, like Europe, has had federalism. Therefore, the Georgian people are European, not Asian. As I mentioned, the Russians had a different approach; they never had federalism, so their leaders were endowed with terrible force, while ours were not. For example, during the time of Queen Tamar, she often spoke to her people not as a sovereign but as an obedient servant of her nation. This has always been the case in Georgia, as it has been in Europe. That is why we are more prepared to be a democratic country than Russia."
