= Akaki Minashvili =

Georgian politician

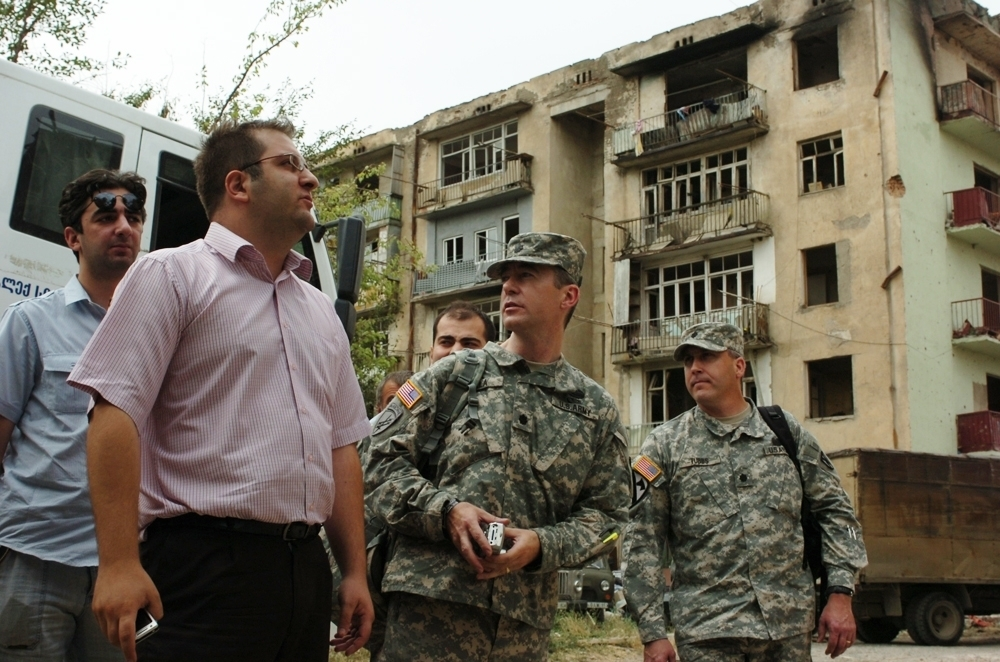
- Minashvili (l) in Gori during the 2008 Russo-Georgian War

Member of the Parliament of Georgia
- In office 11 December 2020 – 25 November 2024
- In office 7 June 2008 – 18 November 2016

Chairman of the Foreign Affairs Committee
- In office 26 December 2008 – 21 October 2012
- Preceded by: Lasha Zhvania
- Succeeded by: Tedo Japaridze

Personal details
- Born: September 24, 1980 (age 46) Tbilisi (Georgian SSR)
- Party: United National Movement
- Education: Tbilisi State University; Central European University

Akaki "Ako" Minashvili (Georgian: აკაკი მინაშვილი; born on September 24, 1980) is a Georgian politician, a member of Parliament in 2008-2016 and 2020-2024, and a former Chairman of its Foreign Relations Committee.

A civil activist, he worked for several civil society organizations, including the Liberty Institute and Article 19 and co-founded the youth group Kmara that would eventually take a leading role in the Rose Revolution. Executive Director of the liberal Liberty Institute in 2004–2007 at a time when the organization had close ties with the Saakashvili administration, he would regularly provide legislative assistance to the United National Movement and would be appointed to the National Security Council for a short term in 2007–2008, before being elected to Parliament.

Foreign Relations Committee Chairman in 2008–2012, Minashvili's term was marked with a reconfiguration of Georgia's foreign policy in the aftermath of the 2008 Russo-Georgian War. In this context, he sought to have the occupied status of Abkhazia and South Ossetia recognized by Western legislatures, became known for his criticism of European institutions in their lack of attention to the region, and was a staunch opponent to the normalization of relations with Russia. His influence led to President Saakashvili entrusting him with domestic responsibilities as well and he would represent the ruling United National Movement in its electoral reform negotiations with the opposition.

In the opposition since 2012, he has been one of the most vocal critics of the Georgian Dream-led government and remained in UNM when its European Georgia faction split in 2017. Reelected to Parliament in 2020, he became the lead negotiator on behalf of UNM during the political crisis that followed the 2020 parliamentary election and the arrest of UNM Chairman Nika Melia, and refused to sign the 19 April 2021 Agreement facilitated by the European Union. In late 2021, he was involved in two separate hunger strikes to call for the release of imprisoned former president Mikheil Saakashvili.

== Early life and education ==
Minashvili was born on September 24, 1980, in Tbilisi, capital of then-Soviet Georgia. He graduated in 2003 from the Faculty of Law of Tbilisi State University. One year later, he received a degree in human rights from the Vienna-based Central European University.

He is married to Ketevan Kobiashvili and has one daughter.

== Civil activism ==
Akaki Minashvili first joined the civil sector in 1999, participating at the time in the Student Government Association of Tbilisi State University, a youth group focused on advocating for the rights of students in the institution. In 2001, while still a student in Tbilisi, he was hired as an attorney by the Liberty Institute, a civil society organization affiliated with the Ilia Chavchavadze University promoting liberal values in the newly independent republic. Through his work, he became a co-founder of Kmara, a youth-based activist movement aimed at fighting against the presidency of Eduard Shevardnadze that would later become one of the main players in the Rose Revolution.

Following the rise to power of the pro-Western Mikheil Saakashvili, Minashvili moved to Article 19, a British non-profit organization dedicated to promoting freedom of speech. He also became a professor on media freedom at TSU and of human rights at the Chavchavadze University. In 2004, he was appointed executive director of the Liberty Institute, whose influence had considerably grown within the Saakashvili administration, and assisted the new government in drafting major pieces of legislation, including a Police Code of Conduct after an uptick in police violence cases, a failed alternative to a Lustration Law that had been advocated by the opposition (the latter envisioning a ban on all Soviet-era officials from holding public office) that would have required all political operatives to disclose their meetings with Russian officials, as well as a theoretical monetary compensation plan for Ossetian victims of discrimination in the 1990s. In some occasions, he criticized decisions of the government, such as the 2004 sentencing of three individuals to prison for spitting on the car of a cabinet minister.

== Political career ==
=== Entry in politics ===
Akaki Minashvili (2008)

In 2007, Akaki Minashvili was appointed as the Director for Defense and Law and Order at the National Security Council, at the time led by Alexandre Lomaia. His term at the time was marked by the November 2007 demonstrations that resulted in a violent police dispersal, the resignation of President Saakashvili, and his reelection in the January snap presidential polls. In the subsequent 2008 parliamentary election, he was placed in 35th position in the ruling United National Movement's electoral list and won a seat in Parliament.

His political influence grew rapidly in the aftermath of the August 2008 Russo-Georgia War and he would be appointed by the end of the year to the High Council of Justice, the Presidential Pardon Commission, and the opposition-chaired investigative committee created to study the circumstances of the war. In the latter, he hit back against suggestions that the Georgian authorities may have been at fault for the start of the war, providing evidence for a planned Russian massive invasion in the days leading to the conflict.

=== Legal Affairs Committee ===
Minashvili was selected as Deputy Chairman of the Legal Affairs Committee. As such, he was instrumental in the passage of major pieces of legislation, including the Meskhetian Repatriation Act of 2009, a bill banning offshore ownership of media in 2010, and a ban on political parties promising financial compensation in exchange of votes in 2011. He was also an opponent of a proposed Lustration Law that would have banned USSR-era Communist Party members from holding public office and took part in the Constitutional Commissions that passed amendments in 2011 moving Parliament to Kutaisi and reducing significantly the powers of the presidency. During his term, he was often critical of Public Defender Sozar Subari, himself a vocal critique of the government's human rights record.

In March 2009, Minashvili was appointed as the UNM representative to an electoral reform working group set up by the National Democratic Institute, tasked with negotiating a new electoral code ahead of the 2012 parliamentary election. During the talks, he pushed back against the opposition's demands for direct mayoral elections in all municipalities and the expansion of the proportional election system in Municipal Assembly elections, compromising with a 25–25 formula that guaranteed half of the seats in the Tbilisi City Assembly to be elected in a majoritarian format. Despite pushback by opposition groups, he took the negotiation process outside of the helm of NDI and held consultations individually with political parties. In December 2011, he pushed for the approval of new political party funding regulations that proved to be controversial.

=== Foreign Relations Committee Chair ===
On December 26, 2008, Akaki Minashvili was selected as Chairman of Parliament's Foreign Relations Committee, a position previously vacated by Lasha Zhvania who had been appointed as Minister of Economy. His term shortly following the Russo-Georgian War was marked with a new foreign policy course aggressively focused on countering Russian lobbying against Georgia on the international scene. He successfully negotiated with Western counterparts for the recognition of the occupied status of Abkhazia and South Ossetia by European legislatures and secured strong condemnation words against Russia in a 2009 PACE resolution for Moscow's recognition of the independence of Abkhazia and South Ossetia. He was notably involved in a debate in April 2011 at PACE with Russian MP Konstantin Kosachev, who had compared Mikheil Saakashvili to Muammar Gaddafi.

Minashvili often criticized European institutions for their ambiguous relationship towards Russia. He called for the resignation of COE Human Rights Commissioner Thomas Hammarberg for failing to intervene in the liberation of four Georgian civilians captured in Tskhinvali in November 2009. He also criticized the European Union Monitoring Mission for being ineffective, instead calling for the mission to become a peacekeeping force covering the occupied territories. He was also a co-author of the 2012 State Strategy on the North Caucasus, which provided for visa-free travel for Russian citizens coming from North Caucasian republics, in addition to education and cultural programs. He was opposed to any direct negotiations with Russia as long as it maintained military forces in the occupied territories and shot down a debate started by the Christian-Democratic Movement to launch talks over the restoration of direct flights between Georgia and Russia.

Akaki Minashvili was critical of opposition forces for their alleged links with Russia. After the revelation of a confidential meeting between two opposition leaders with a former Georgian government official in exile in Russia in June 2009, he stated that the opposition was "controlled by Russia". He also suggested former Speaker Nino Burjanadze leave Georgia after her announced pro-Russian foreign policy orientation. Bidzina Ivanishvili, founder of Georgian Dream and a Russia-tied businessman, called him one of the "Saakashvili regime's ideologists", while Minashvili accused the bloody May 2011 protests of being planned by the Kremlin.

In 2012, he was appointed to a special commission set up in Parliament to study the feasibility of the planned Lazika City, a major infrastructure project of the Saakashvili administration, and was in charge of implementing an autonomous local judiciary system based on common law.

Reelected in the 2012 parliamentary election that saw the nationwide victory of Georgian Dream, he would remain as vice-chairman of the Foreign Relations Committee until 2016.

=== In the opposition ===
==== Second term in Parliament ====
In the opposition since 2012, Akaki Minashvili has long alleged that Georgian Dream's victory had been beneficial to Russia and has accused the current authorities of maintaining a pro-Russian foreign policy course. He was originally opposed to the restoration of the Georgian citizenship to Bidzina Ivanishvili, which had been removed by President Saakashvili months before the 2012 parliamentary election, and later accused State Minister for Reintegration Paata Zakareishvili of seeking a "policy of appeasement" with Russia. In January 2013, he called for the dismissal of Foreign Minister Maia Panjikidze for allegedly causing diplomatic tensions between Tbilisi, Brussels, and Washington. In September 2014, he skipped a vote on a resolution condemning the Russian aggression of Ukraine as the bill did not provide for sanctions against Russia.

A close ally of Bacho Akhalaia, a powerful Defense Minister in the Saakashvili administration, he condemned his arrest in 2013 as "politically motivated" and sent a lewd phone message to the judge in charge of Akhalaia's case, something that would later be condemned by the High Council of Justice and would lead to Prime Minister Irakli Gharibashvili to call for an investigation into whether or not Minashvili sought to threaten the court. When visiting Akhalaia in prison, it was revealed that the new prison administration had installed microphones to listen in to some prisoners' conversations in violation of Georgian law.

A vocal critique of the Georgian Dream government, he has been involved in several skirmishes with political activists. On December 19, 2012, he was assaulted by GD activists after exiting a meeting with President Saakashvili in Kutaisi. He was also injured in May 2016 in Samegrelo as he was observing local elections. In September 2016, the MIA would summon him after a leaked audio recording allegedly heard Saakashvili plan with him a series of protests to destabilize the government after that year's parliamentary election, leading the State Security Service of Georgia to investigate a coup plot, while Minashvili refused to attend his subpoena. In 2015, he voted against bill that separated the SSSG from the Ministry of Internal Affairs.

==== UNM Leadership ====
Akaki Minashvili left Parliament in the aftermath of the 2016 parliamentary election. As the ranks of UNM started to split between those supporting a radical struggle including a boycott and those choosing to leave the leadership of Mikheil Saakashvili to become a right-wing parliamentary opposition party, Minashvili originally opposed Saakashvili's call for a boycott and was largely believed to have joined the ranks of Giga Bokeria and his new European Georgia party. However, he would eventually vote in favor of the boycott during a special session of UNM's Political Council on October 13, 2016, making him one of the few public figures to remain in the party in 2017. In January 2017, he was elected to UNM's Political Council, becoming its Vice-chairman and Political Secretary in 2022.

While no longer holding public office, he remained a vocal figure in Georgian politics. He came out against a 2017 moratorium on the sale of agricultural land to foreign citizens and alleged that the authorities had deleted video surveillance footage from the scene of the kidnapping of Azerbaijani journalist Afgan Mukhtarli in 2017, linking his abduction to a potential deal between Georgian and Azerbaijani special services. In October 2018, he was nominated by the Strength Is in Unity coalition, an electoral bloc led by UNM, to run for Mayor of Samtredia, but was defeated by GD's Ramaz Rukhadze. In May 2019, he was involved in a highly mediatized scuffle in Zugdidi when local UNM mayoral candidate Sandra Roelofs was refused a meeting with local voters.

On January 30, 2023, following the election of Levan Khabeishvili as chairman of the party, Minashvili announced his resignation from the position of Political Secretary and decided to "distance" himself from the party's leadership, although he confirmed he would remain a party member. On February 5, a party congress held to inaugurate Khabeishvili's chairmanship also selected Minashvili to seat on the party's Political Council (in an ex-officio capacity as an MP), although Minashvili rejected the appointment and called the process "undemocratic".

==== 2020 elections and parliamentary boycott ====
In the 2020 parliamentary election, Akaki Minashvili was in 31st place in the Strength is in Unity's electoral list, winning him a seat that he refused to accept after allegations of massive voter fraud surfaced. The boycott launched by 49 opposition MPs caused a political crisis that would involve the resignation of Prime Minister Giorgi Gakharia, the return to power of Irakli Gharibashvili, and the arrest of UNM Chairman Nika Melia. In an attempt to mediate an end to the crisis, EU Council President Charles Michel visited Georgia to begin negotiations between the opposition and Georgian Dream, while Minashvili was selected as lead negotiator on behalf of UNM, alongside Salome Samadashvili and Republican Party chair Khatuna Samnidze.

Minashvili's stance during the negotiations became known as uncompromising, pushing for the release of individuals the party considered to be political prisoners before formally agreeing to sit down at the negotiation table. This stance led to the failure of an original agreement negotiated by EU Special Representative Christian Danielsson, pushing both President Salome Zourabichvili and Charles Michel to seek direct involvement. In the second round of negotiations, he was opposed to the proposal of conditioning repeat parliamentary elections to GD's performance in the upcoming local elections and publicly stated that UNM would agree to end its boycott only once repeat elections were scheduled. Ultimately, President Zourabichvili pardoned Giorgi Rurua, while the European Union paid Nika Melia's bail, but Minashvili refused to sign the 19 April 2021 Agreement, arguing that it failed to provide mechanisms for judicial reform. Throughout this time, political observers noted him to be the de facto leader of UNM.

While UNM did not sign the agreement, Minashvili and his other party colleagues ended their boycott after the release of Melia, and he visited Kyiv to meet with Mikheil Saakashvili shortly thereafter. When the latter was arrested after his secret return to Georgia in October 2021, Minashvili called for his release and was part of 9 MPs to launch a five-day hunger strike to call for Saakashvili's transfer to a private clinic for treatment after medical complications. On December 21, he was again one of 300 party activists to launch a new hunger strike calling for his release, although it would be short-lived.

Akaki Minashvili is a member of the European Integration Committee and serves on the Georgian delegations to PACE and the EU-Georgia Parliamentary Association Committee.
