= David Zurabishvili =

Georgian politician

David Zurabishvili (Georgian: დავით ზურაბიშვილი; born 16 March 1957) is a Georgian politician and the leading member of the Republican Party of Georgia. He has been a member of parliament since 2004 and is Chairman of opposition faction Democratic Front in Parliament of Georgia.

In 1996 together with Levan Ramishvili, Givi Targamadze and Giga Bokeria he co-founded the Liberty Institute, a non-profit, non-partisan, liberal public policy advocacy foundation based in the capital Tbilisi. He was deputy chair of parliamentary faction of United National Movement and deputy chair of the Committee on Education, Culture and Science.

In September 2005 Zurabishvili switched to the opposition Republican Party of Georgia.
