= Dumbadze =

Dumbadze (Georgian: დუმბაძე) is a Georgian surname, which may refer to:

- Gela Dumbadze (born 1965), a Georgian diplomat and government official
- Ivan Dumbadze (1851–1916), an Imperial Russian general
- Nina Dumbadze (1919–1983), a Soviet-Georgian discus thrower
- Nodar Dumbadze (1928–1984), a Georgian writer
- Roman Dumbadze (1964–2012), a Georgian general
