= Irakli Beraia =

Georgian politician and diplomat

- ირაკლი ბერაია
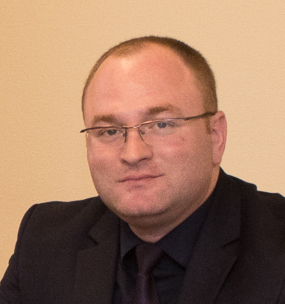

Chief of the Georgian Intelligence Service
- Incumbent
- Assumed office 5 April 2024
- Prime Minister: Irakli Kobakhidze
- Preceded by: Shalva Lomidze

Chairman of the Defense and Security Committee of the Parliament of Georgia
- In office 11 December 2020 – 5 April 2024
- Deputy: Alexandre Tabatadze; Teona Akubardia; Tengiz Sharmanashvili
- Preceded by: Irakli Sesiashvili

Chairman of the Foreign Relations Committee of the Parliament of Georgia
- In office 26 November 2019 – 11 December 2020
- Preceded by: Sophie Katsarava
- Succeeded by: Nikoloz Samkharadze

Member of the Parliament of Georgia
- In office 18 November 2016 – 5 April 2024
- Preceded by: Guram Misablishvili
- Succeeded by: Incorporated in the 26th District (MP: Irakli Khakhubia)
- Constituency: 63rd Parliamentary District

Personal details
- Born: 26 October 1978 (age 47) Senaki, Georgia SSR, Soviet Union
- Party: Georgian Dream
- Education: Diplomatic Academy of Georgia; University of Westminster

Irakli Beraia (born on 26 October 1978; in Georgian: ირაკლი ბერაია) is a Georgian politician and intelligence officer, former director for intelligence gathering in the State Security Service of Georgia and a member of Parliament since 2016, affiliated with the ruling Georgian Dream party since its rise to power.

Chairman of the Foreign Affairs Committee in the Parliament of Georgia in 2019-2020 and then chair of the Defense and Security Committee since 2020, Beraia has been one of the highest-ranking members of the ruling majority in Georgia and has played a major role in several political developments in recent years. He is known for having made controversial statements about President Volodymyr Zelenskyy of Ukraine, whom he accused of seeking to force Georgia into a war with Russia, for having supported a controversial bill against Western funding of civil society organizations known as the "Foreign Agents bill", for having co-sponsored a bill imposing strict restrictions on public protests, and for having sided with Russia in his vote record as a member of the Parliamentary Assembly of the Council of Europe.

On 31 October 2023, Irakli Beraia was involved in a scandal after using lewd comments against a female member of Parliament during a live session of Parliament.

== Early life and education ==
Irakli Beraia was born on 26 October 1978 in then-Soviet Tskhakaia (modern-day Senaki), a large town in Mingrelia. In 1998, he graduated from the Diplomatic Academy of Georgia. In 2006, he received a degree in diplomatic studies from the University of Westminster in London.

Shortly after graduating in 1999, Beraia became the West Georgia coordinator for the Red Cross Society of Georgia, at a time when the region was suffering from an economic and refugee crisis in the fallout of the Georgian Civil War and the war in Abkhazia. In 2001, he briefly served as Red Cross Coordinator for the Samegrelo-Zemo Svaneti region.

== Early career ==
In 2002, Irakli Beraia joined the private sector as Deputy Director General of Ksilotransi, a subsidiary of a major timber company involved in deforestation activities in the Samegrelo-Zemo Svaneti region. Until 2004, he worked as the Forest and Raw Material Department head for that same company, at a time when illegal timber was considered a major challenge related to corruption in Georgian public affairs.

He departed from the company in 2004 and after a three-year gap to study in the United Kingdom, he returned to Georgia and became Deputy Director General of Spetsteknikaresursi, an LLC owned by Russian-Georgian businessman Gocha Khelaia.

In 2007, he was appointed by Economy Minister Giorgi Arveladze as Director of the National Investment Agency, a post he held for a few months only. His official biography fails to mention Irakli Beraia's career between 2008 and 2012.

== Government career ==
During the 2012 parliamentary elections, Irakli Beraia joined Georgian Dream, a party created in opposition to the Mikheil Saakashvili administration by Russian-Georgian oligarch Bidzina Ivanishvili, managing the party's campaign in Samegrelo-Zemo Svaneti, a region solidly backing the United National Movement.

Upon the victory of Georgian Dream in those elections, Beraia was appointed by the new Interior Minister Irakli Gharibashvili as Director of the Ministry's Reforms and Development Department. As such, he was responsible for the "depoliticization" campaign within the MIA and for drafting annual strategy papers on behalf of the MIA. In 2014, he announced the introduction of a reform of driving license exam procedures that would have required practical exams, although that reform was never enforced.

Beraia served in that post under the ministerships of Gharibashvili and Alexandre Chikaidze. He received a Special Merit Medal for his work in May 2013.

== Intelligence officer ==
After the 2015 creation of the State Security Service as Georgia's leading domestic intelligence agency, Irakli Beraia was appointed director of the powerful Information-Analytical Department inside the agency, responsible for intelligence gathering.

In the SSSG, he was named the point-person responsible for negotiations with South Ossetian de facto authorities as part of the Incident Prevention and Response Mechanism (IPRM), held monthly in Ergneti. In December 2015, Beraia claimed that he had convinced the South Ossetian side to agree to restore a trilateral human rights dialogue mediated by the Red Cross that had been boycotted by Tskhinvali since 2013, although the format was never factually restored. In May 2016, Beraia took part in the first IPRM meeting with Abkhazian authorities since 2012, although tensions surrounding the murder of Georgian civilian Giga Otkhozoria by Abkhazian security forces made the format collapse.

Under his posting, the SSSG took over all monitoring activities related to the conflict zones of Abkhazia and South Ossetia, especially related to increased borderization activities by Russian forces around Tskhinvali.

On 31 December 2015, he was promoted to the rank of Senior Lieutenant of State Security.

== Parliament of Georgia ==
=== 2016 election ===
In the 2016 parliamentary elections, Irakli Beraia was nominated by Georgian Dream to run for the 63rd Parliamentary District, which included the Senaki Municipality before the redistricting of 2020. His campaign was inaugurated by Prime Minister Giorgi Kvirikashvili, who called him "young but experienced". He ran against six candidates, including incumbent Guram Misabishvili (SFP), Koba Nakopia (UNM), and Senaki Municipal Assembly Chairman Khvicha Jishkariani (FD). During the campaign, questions were raised about the involvement of the SSSG to attack opponents. Beraia failed to secure a win in the first round, facing Nakopia in a runoff that he won with 75% of the vote.

In the 9th Parliament of Georgia, he served as Deputy Chairman of the Defense and Security Committee. He was also one of the co-sponsors of a controversial bill that banned the sale of agricultural land to foreign citizens, a bill that Transparency International called "unconstitutional".

=== Foreign Affairs Committee Chair ===
Irakli Beraia was selected as Chair of the Foreign Relations Committee in November 2019 following the resignation of Sophie Katsarava, the latter being one of a dozen Georgian Dream MPs resigning due to the party's failure to back a major electoral reform constitutional amendment. During a major political crisis that followed the failure of that constitutional amendment, Beraia was one of the leading negotiators on behalf of Georgian Dream during talks with the opposition mediated by Western diplomats.

Beraia's term as chairman of the Georgian legislature's foreign policy arm was characterized by controversy over several of his statements regarding Georgia's relations with the United States and the European Union. He accused the United States Congress of being a target of "contradictory information... as part of destructive steps and deliberate attempt of the radical opposition to affect the country's image abroad," after a series of criticisms by several Congressmen over democratic backsliding in Georgia. In January 2020, he sided with the Russian delegation to the Parliamentary Assembly of the Council of Europe against a resolution reauthorizing democratic monitoring by the Assembly in Georgia and several Eastern European countries.

In response to an interview by Russian Foreign Minister Sergey Lavrov in which he praised Georgian Dream, Beraia criticized the previous administration of Mikheil Saakashvili for having started the 2008 Russo-Georgian war. In 2020, Beraia backed the restoration of direct flights between Russia and Georgia, interrupted a year prior.

=== Defense and Security Committee Chair ===
Upon his reelection in the 2020 parliamentary elections, Irakli Beraia was appointed Chairman of the Defense and Security Committee, amidst a boycott by the opposition. His term has largely coincided with the Russian invasion of Ukraine and a controversial response by the Georgian government. In October 2022, Beraia claimed holding evidence that President Volodymyr Zelenskyy was seeking to start a war between Georgia and the Russian Federation after Ukraine sanctioned several relatives of Bidzina Ivanishvili. Following the July 2023 NATO Summit in Vilnius which communicated a decoupling of the Alliance's policy towards Ukraine and Georgia, Beraia stated that he "did not have special expectations from the Summit and the expansion of the Alliance to the East is not expected." In October 2023, he voted in favor of the impeachment of President Salome Zourabichvili over her visits to European countries, saying "she gets what she deserves."

Beraia was one of the leading Georgian Dream members pushing in March 2023 for the adoption of the Transparency of Foreign Influence Act (also known as the "Foreign Agents bill") which would have granted the government leverage to prosecute civil society and media organizations receiving Western funding. In a controversial move, he expelled from a session of the Defense and Security Committee MP Iago Khvichia (Girchi) after the latter criticized the bill.

In June 2023, he facilitated the fast-track approval of a controversial bill that granted the SSSG all oversight over the import and export of "special equipment", a law that opponents claimed would facilitate the transit of sanctioned goods to Russia. During discussions of the bill in the Defense and Security Committee, he expelled his own Deputy Chair Teona Akubardia for criticizing the law.

In October 2023, he co-sponsored an amendment to the Assembly and Demonstrations Act that banned temporary installations during public protests and increased administrative penalties for arrested demonstrators. That bill has been largely criticized by the international community.

== Controversies ==
=== Gender-based attacks ===
On 31 October 2023, Irakli Beraia made a series of controversial comments during a live parliamentary session against opposition MP Teona Akubardia after the latter criticized the Defense and Security Committee for failing to address the installation of a Russian naval military base in Abkhazia. He called the female MP a "shameless and disgraceful liar" who failed to take part in international delegations for "going on shopping trips or being too hungover and lazy to lift her head from the pillow." He eventually added "I urge her to refrain from mentioning me and my committee with her long tongue, considering everywhere it's been."

The comments were described as lewd, obscene, and deplorable. A group of female MPs held a briefing moments after the incident accusing Beraia of using a SSSG playbook to scare Akubardia from speaking out against the government. Beraia's speech was condemned by civil society and President Salome Zourabichvili, and criticized by Public Defender Levan Ioseliani and fellow Georgian Dream MP Nino Tsilosani.

The Democracy Research Institute called the statement "discriminatory" and called on the Ethics Council and Gender Equality Council to issue rulings against Beraia. Though Beraia made a formal apology, the United National Movement's parliamentary faction called it "perfunctory" and called for his resignation as Defense and Security Committee chair. Teona Akubardia stated that "these SSSG methods will not silence me."

Already in June 2022, Irakli Beraia was involved in an altercation with a female journalist from Mtavari Arkhi, insulting her publicly after refusing to answer a question.

=== Defense of domestic wiretapping ===
In February 2022, Irakli Beraia defended the SSSG after a massive leak of domestic intelligence files revealed that the agency had been collecting information on members of the opposition and had been protecting a call service racketeering operation in Georgia. Despite several calls by the opposition to hold a hearing of SSSG Director Grigol Liluashvili, Beraia blocked the proposal. In a statement released to the media, he stated:

I don't see the need for a hearing. The only one that can call such a hearing is my committee and not the agenda of the United National Movement. The SSSG is headed by a patriot, a highly-qualified professional, under the leadership of which the Agency works effectively for the prevention and neutralization of internal and external threats against Georgia, which goes against the agenda of the pests in the opposition.

=== Argentina trip ===
In April 2022, a media investigation by TV Pirveli revealed that Irakli Beraia was one of four Georgian MPs who had spent more than 40,000 GEL on a trip to Argentina. Beraia claimed the purpose of his visit was to deliver a lecture on Georgian foreign policy in Latin America, but it was eventually shown that the MPs had attended a soccer match in Buenos Aires. The episode was not investigated by the Ethics Council.
