= Ramishvili =

Ramishvili (Georgian: რამიშვილი) is a Georgian surname. Notable people with the surname include:

- Isidore Ramishvili (1859–1937), Georgian Social Democratic politician and journalist
- Levan Ramishvili (born 1973), Georgian politician
- Nino Ramishvili (1910–2000), Georgian dancer
- Noe Ramishvili (1881–1930), Georgian politician
- Teimuraz Ramishvili (born 1955), Russian diplomat of Georgian origin
