= State Ministry on Diaspora Issues of Georgia =

2008–2016 Georgian ministry

State Ministry on the Diaspora Issues of Georgia
- Coat of arms of Georgia

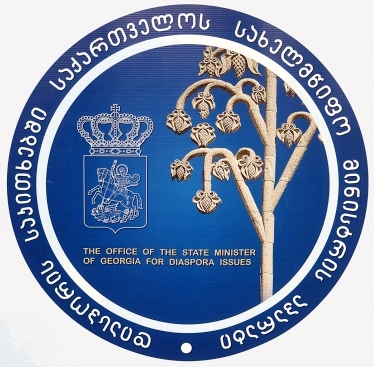
- Logo

Agency overview
- Formed: 2008
- Dissolved: 2016
- Headquarters: 7 Ingorokva str. Tbilisi, Georgia 0134
- Agency executive: Kote Surguladze, State Minister of Georgia on Diaspora Issues
- Website: www.diaspora.gov.ge

The State Minister's Office on Diaspora Issues of Georgia (Georgian: დიასპორის საკითხებში საქართველოს სახელმწიფო მინისტრის აპარატი, diasporis sakitkhebshi sakartvelos sakhelmtsipo ministris aparati) was a governmental agency within the Cabinet of Georgia in charge of establishing and maintaining contacts with the Georgian diaspora abroad. The ministry was established in 2008. In November 2016, the Office was dissolved and merged with the Ministry of Foreign Affairs.

== Ministers ==
- Iulon Gagoshidze, 2008–2009
- Mirza Davitaia, 2009–2012
- Kote Surguladze, 2012–2014
- Gela Dumbadze, 2014–2016

== See also ==
- Cabinet of Georgia
