= David Bezhuashvili =

Georgian businessman (born 1969)

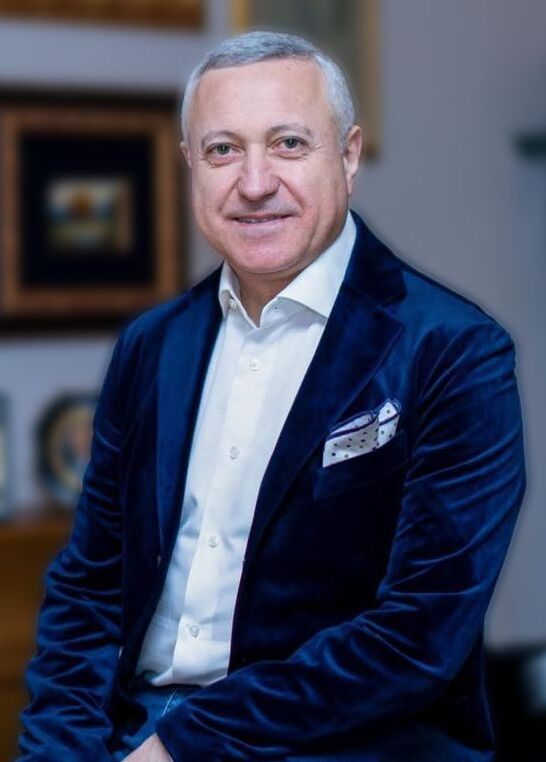
- David Bezhuashvili

Chairman of the Board, GIG Holding
- Incumbent
- Assumed office 2016

Member of the Parliament of Georgia
- In office 20 November 1999 – 18 November 2016

Personal details
- Born: 19 January 1969 (age 57) Manglisi, Tetritskaro Municipality, Georgia
- Citizenship: Georgian
- Party: United National Movement; Union of Citizens of Georgia
- Spouse: Tea Tcheishvili
- Children: 2 (Irakli and Nika)
- Relatives: Gela Bezhuashvili (brother)
- Education: Ivane Javakhishvili Tbilisi State University
- Occupation: Businessman, philanthropist
- Known for: Founder of GIG Holding and the David Bezhuashvili Education Foundation
- Awards: St. George's Order of Victory (Georgia, 2013); Order of Friendship (Kazakhstan, 2021)

David Bezhuashvili (born 19 January 1969, Manglisi, Tetritskaro Municipality) is a Georgian businessman and philanthropist. In 1994, Bezhuashvili established a company that was later restructured into what is now known as GIG Holding, one of Georgia's largest multi-industry holdings, with activities in energy (thermal and renewable), logistics & transportation, mechanical engineering, agriculture, pharmaceutical production, healthcare, insurance, cement production, real estate development, and the service sector.

From 1999 to 2016, Bezhuashvili was a Member of the Parliament of Georgia, elected as a majoritarian deputy from the Tetritskaro district. During his parliamentary career, he was involved in matters concerning Georgia’s European integration, regional development, and international cooperation.

From 2002 to 2014, he served as the President of the National Weightlifting Federation of Georgia, contributing to the development of sports infrastructure and the promotion of young Georgian athletes on the international stage. In 2015, he founded the David Bezhuashvili Education Foundation, which focuses on advancing education, expanding youth opportunities, and safeguarding Georgia’s cultural heritage.

== Early life and education ==
David Bezhuashvili was born and raised in Manglisi, Tetritskaro District, Georgia. He studied at Manglisi Secondary School No. 2 and later attended Ivane Javakhishvili Tbilisi State University, graduating in 1993 from the Faculty of Economics with a specialization in macroeconomics and a master's degree in economics. In the same year, he earned a bachelor's degree from the Faculty of Arts and Humanities. He has a PHD in Economics.

From 1987 to 1989, he completed mandatory military service.

== Private sector activity ==
In 1989, while still a student, Bezhuashvili began his entrepreneurial career by trading petroleum products in his local district. He also founded “Imedi” LLC, a stone-processing company that operated successfully until 1993.

After graduating, he expanded his business activities to Kazakhstan and Russia, particularly in Tomsk, establishing supply chains serving major chemical, oil refining, and automobile manufacturing enterprises. In Georgia, he founded “Interpack” LLC, which became the only manufacturer in the South Caucasus producing polypropylene packaging materials for fertilizers and food products.

In 1996, Bezhuashvili began investing in cement production and the natural gas transportation and distribution sectors. In 1998, he founded JSC “Sakgazi” and also served as the managing executive of JSC “Saktransgazmretsvi”.

In 1999, he suspended his business activity, transferred his shares to a trust management structure, and ran for Parliament. After leaving politics in 2016, he returned to business, becoming Chairman of the Board of Directors of GIG Holding. Under his leadership, the company expanded internationally and diversified its portfolio.

== Parliamentary activities ==
From 1999 to 2016, Bezhuashvili served four consecutive terms in the Parliament of Georgia, representing the Tetritskaro district. He was a member of several key committees, including those on Sectoral Economy, Foreign Relations, Mountainous Regions, Regional Policy and Self-Governance, Sports and Youth Affairs, and European Integration.

He chaired the Subcommittee on Taxes and Tax Revenues and was active in parliamentary diplomacy. From 2000 to 2004, he led Georgia’s parliamentary delegation to Ukraine, and from 2008 to 2012 he headed the Georgia–Kazakhstan Friendship Group. Between 2008 and 2016, he was part of Georgia’s delegation to the Inter-Parliamentary Union (IPU).

== Philanthropy ==
Bezhuashvili has supported numerous educational, cultural, and humanitarian initiatives through the David Bezhuashvili Education Foundation, founded in 2015. The Fund promotes modern, progressive education and civic values in Georgia.

Among its projects are the establishment of the “Book Museum” at the National Library of Georgia, the “Nature of the Caucasus” exhibition at the Georgian National Museum, scholarships for Georgian students, humanitarian aid for internally displaced persons affected by conflict, and cultural projects in cooperation with the Patriarchate of Georgia.

In 2025, the Fund announced the creation of the Sabado Leadership Academy, aimed at developing future Georgian leaders.

== Personal life ==
David Bezhuashvili is married to Tea Tcheishvili (born 1976), founder of the European School in Tbilisi, one of the largest private educational institutions in Georgia offering the national curriculum, International Baccalaureate (IB) programs, and Advanced Placement (AP) courses.

They have two sons, Irakli and Nika. Irakli Bezhuashvili, graduated from Columbia University(2024) with the Bachellor’s Degree and currently pursuing his Master’s Degree at the University of Oxford, UK(Class 2026). Nika Bezhuashvili (born 2004) – studying at Columbia University (Class of 2026).

His brother, Gela Bezhuashvili, is a Georgian statesman and career diplomat.

== Recognition ==
- St. George's Order of Victory (No. 073, 2013) — awarded by the President of Georgia for outstanding contribution to national development.
- Order of Friendship (No. 42246, 2021) — awarded by the President of Kazakhstan for contributions to Kazakhstan’s economy and strengthening friendship and cooperation between Georgia and Kazakhstan.
