= National Security Council (Georgia) =

Georgian government advisory body

- Georgian: ეროვნული უსაფრთხოების საბჭო
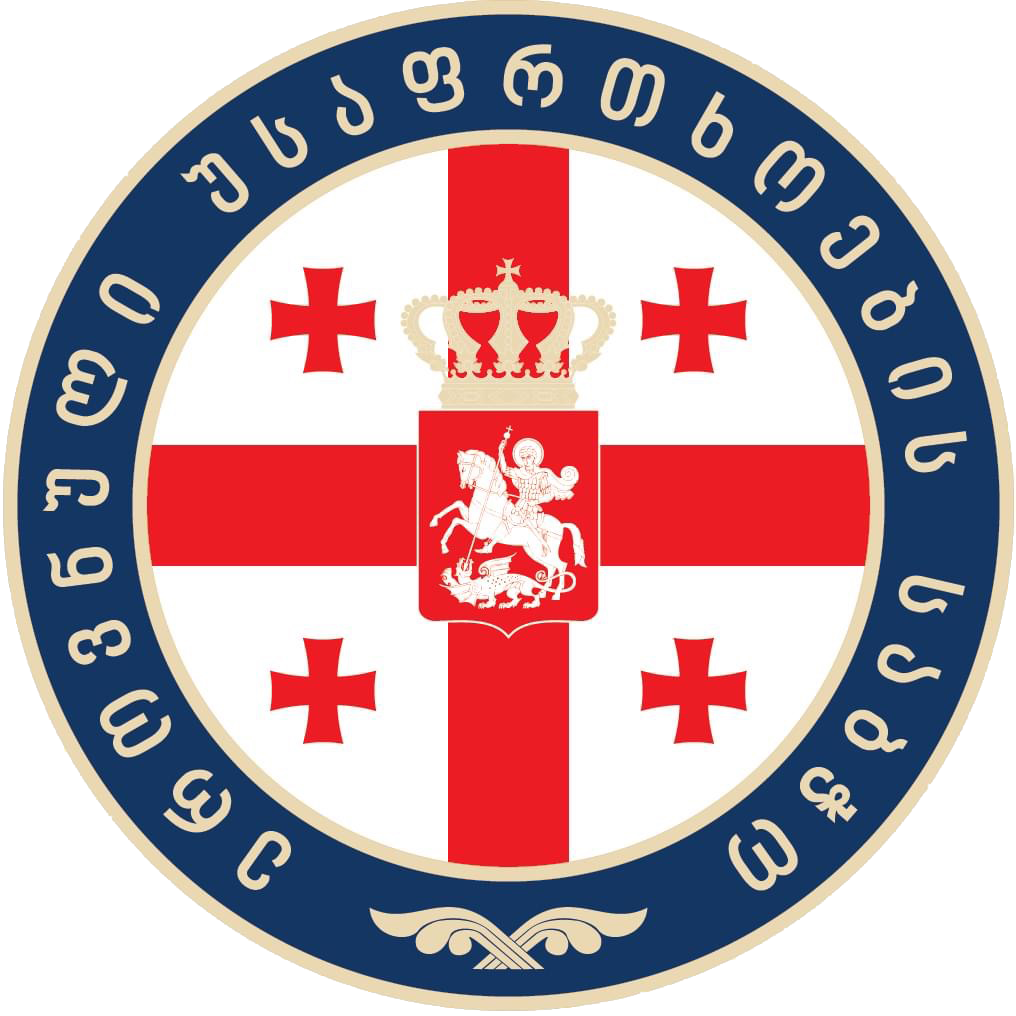
- Seal

Advisory body overview
- Formed: November 6, 1992; 32 years ago (as National Security and Defence Council)
- Advisory body executives: Irakli Kobakhidze, Prime Minister (Chair); Vakhtang Gomelauri Minister of Internal Affairs of Georgia; Council Secretary
- Website: www.nsc.gov.ge

The National Security Council (NSC; Georgian: ეროვნული უსაფრთხოების საბჭო, romanized: erovnuli usaprtkhoebis sabch'o) is an advisory body for the government of Georgia dealing with matters of national security. The council is led by the prime minister and includes other high ranking government, intelligence and military officials.

== History ==
The National Security Council (NSC) of Georgia was established under President Eduard Shevardnadze on 24 January 1996. The respective law defined the council as an advisory body of the President of Georgia for decision-making on strategic questions of the organisation of military construction and defence, international and foreign policy related to the security of the country, maintenance of stability, law and order.

The National Security Council included the minister of state (later the prime minister), the minister of foreign affairs, the minister of defense, the minister of state security (abolished in 2004), the minister of internal affairs, and the secretary of the NSC. The president served as the chairperson of the Council. The chairperson of Parliament and those of the supreme representative bodies of the Abkhazia and Adjara autonomous republics, though not members, were to participate in the NSC activities. The NSC secretary had a number of duties, including general organizational, coordination, and management duties related to the functioning of the NSC and the NSC Apparatus. The secretary also serves in the role of assistant to the president of Georgia "on questions of national security".

The NSC was abolished by a controversial law passed by the Parliament of Georgia on 31 October 2018, which became effective upon the inauguration of President Salome Zurabishvili on 16 December 2018. The decision was criticized by the then-President Giorgi Margvelashvili, the incumbent NSC secretary David Rakviashvili, and foreign commentators such as Ronald S. Mangum.

In April 2019, the NSC was reestablished under the leadership of Prime Minister. It also includes seven other permanent members: ministers of defense, internal affairs, foreign affairs, and finances, as well as heads of state security and intelligence services, and the chief of defense forces. The reconstituted council had its inaugural meeting on 1 May 2019.

== National Defense Council ==
According to the 2018 constitutional amendment, a consultative body—the National Defense Council—is called for only during martial law. It is chaired by the president of Georgia and also includes the prime minister, the chairperson of Parliament, the minister of defense, and the chief of defense forces. The president of Georgia can invite individual members of the Parliament and of the government to join the council as members.

== Members ==
- Irakli Kobakhidze, Prime Minister of Georgia; Chairman
- Vakhtang Gomelauri, Minister of Internal Affairs of Georgia; NSC Secretary
- Grigol Liluashvili, Chief of the State Security Service of Georgia
- Irakli Chikovani, Minister of Defense of Georgia
- Irakli Beraia, Chief of Intelligence Service of Georgia
- Lasha Khutsishvili, Minister of Finance of Georgia
- Maka Bochorishvili, Minister of Foreign Affairs of Georgia
- Giorgi Matiashvili, Chief of the Defense Forces

== List of secretaries of the National Security Council ==
- Vakhtang Gomelauri, 19 February 2020 -
- Levan Izoria, 8 September 2019 - 27 January 2020
- Giorgi Gakharia, 1 May 2019 – 3 September 2019
- David Rakviashvili, October 2016 – December 2018
- Irina Imerlishvili, November 2013 – October 2016
- Giga Bokeria, November 2010 – November 2013
- Eka Tkeshelashvili, December 2008 – November 2010
- Alexander Lomaia, November 2007 – December 2008
- Kote Kemularia, December 2005 – November 2007
- Levan Choladze, October 2005 – December 2005
- Gela Bezhuashvili, June 2004 – October 2005
- Ivane Merabishvili, January 2004 – June 2004
- Tedo Japaridze, March 2002 – November 2003
- Nugzar Sajaia, 1996 – February 2002
