= Levan Choladze =

Georgian politician and diplomat

Levan Choladze ლევან ჭოლაძე

Secretary of the National security council
- In office October 2005 – December 2005
- Preceded by: Gela Bezhuashvili
- Succeeded by: Kote Kemularia

Personal details
- Born: April 9, 1978 (age 48) Tbilisi, Georgian SSR, Soviet Union
- Education: Tbilisi State University
- Occupation: politician

Levan Choladze (Georgian: ლევან ჭოლაძე, born April 9, 1978) is a Georgian politician and diplomat. He formerly served as Chairman of Chamber of Control of Georgia (2007-2008), Secretary of the National Security Council of Georgia from October to December 2005, and Deputy Minister of Foreign Affairs of Georgia (2006-2007)

== Educational Background ==
- 2003 - Attended NATO Defense College, (Rome, Italy).
- Summer 2003 - Studied at York St. John College of the University of Leeds, School of International Education (Great Britain).
- 2002 - Royal Netherlands Military Academy, Georgian-Netherlands International Security Course.
- 2000 - graduated from faculty of International Law and International Relations, Tbilisi State University, majoring in International Law and was conferred qualification of Lawyer.

== Professional experience ==
- 2008-2011 - First Deputy Minister of Agriculture of Georgia.
- 2007-2008 - Chairman of the Chamber of Control of Georgia.
- 2005-2007 - Deputy Minister of Foreign Affairs.
- October–December 2005 - National Security Advisor to the President of Georgia - Secretary of the National Security Council.
- 2004-2005 - First Deputy Secretary of the National Security Council.
- June–October 2004 - Director of State and Public Security Department. NSC.
- February–June 2004 - Head of Defense Minister's Office.
- 2003-2004 - Deputy Director of Defense Policy and International Relations Department. Ministry of Defense.
- 2002-2003 - Head of International Legal Division. Ministry of Defense.
- 1998–2002 - Different positions at the International Legal Division. Ministry of Defense.
- 1996–1998 - General Prosecutors Office of Georgia.

Preceded by Zurab Soselia	Chairman, Chamber of Control of Georgia; 2007-2008	Succeeded by Levan Bezhashvili

Preceded by Gela Bezhuashvili	Secretary of the National Security Council of Georgia; October–December 2005	Succeeded by Konstantin Kemularia
