= 5 Days of War =

2011 war film

- Official teaser poster
- Directed by: Renny Harlin
- Screenplay by: Mikko Alanne
- Story by: David Battle
- Produced by: Mirza Davitaia; Koba Nakopia; Renny Harlin; George Lascu
- Starring: Rupert Friend; Emmanuelle Chriqui; Richard Coyle; Heather Graham; Johnathon Schaech; Rade Šerbedžija; Kenneth Cranham; Antje Traue; Dean Cain; Andy García; Val Kilmer
- Cinematography: Checco Varese
- Edited by: Brian Berdan
- Music by: Trevor Rabin
- Production company: RexMedia
- Distributed by: Anchor Bay Entertainment
- Release date: June 5, 2011 (Georgia)
- Running time: 113 minutes
- Country: United States
- Languages: English; Georgian; Russian
- Budget: $12 million
- Box office: $316,944

5 Days of War is a 2011 war film directed by Renny Harlin. The story is about the Russo-Georgian War over the Russian-backed breakaway autonomous republic of South Ossetia in Georgia, including the events leading up to the conflict.

The film was released in Georgia as 5 Days of August, and in other countries as 5 Days of War and also City on Fire.

== Plot ==
In 2007, during the Iraq War, a Georgian contingent of the coalition forces saves the life of American reporter Thomas Anders, although one of his colleagues, Miriam Eisner, is killed in the process. One year later, in 2008, he returns to Los Angeles, California but soon goes to Georgia on the advice of some of his friends in Tbilisi, who suspect that a large conflict is brewing. He, along with his cameraman Sebastian Ganz, delve deeper into Georgian life as conflict escalates and they get caught in the crossfire when an air raid strikes a local wedding they stumble upon.

With members of the wedding party, including Tatia Medoev, and the help of Georgian soldier Rezo Avaliani, who had earlier saved them in Iraq, Thomas and Sebastian's mission becomes getting their footage of an atrocity by Russian irregulars out of the country. They find themselves faced with international apathy due to the opening of the 2008 Olympic Games and their flight leads them to the Gori. The film ends with a long series of testimonials from Georgian citizens who lost family members during the conflict.

== Cast ==
- Rupert Friend as Thomas Anders, an American reporter
- Emmanuelle Chriqui as Tatia Medoev, a young Georgian woman
- Richard Coyle as Sebastian Ganz, an English reporter
- Heather Graham as Miriam Eisner, an American reporter in Iraq
- Johnathon Schaech as Rezo Avaliani, a young Georgian officer
- Rade Serbedzija as Col. Alexandr Demidov
- Andy García as Mikheil Saakashvili, the President of Georgia
- Val Kilmer as "Dutchman", a journalist
- Mikko Nousiainen as Daniil
- Mikheil Gomiashvili as Anton Medoev, father of Tatia
- Ani Imnadze as Sofi Medoev
- Antje Traue as Zoe, an American reporter
- Kenneth Cranham as Michael Stilton, an English war reporter
- Dean Cain as Chris Bailot, secretary of Saakashvili
- Sergo Shvedkov as Temur Iakobashvili, Georgian Minister of Reintegration
- Steven Robertson as Davit Kezerashvili, Georgian Defense Minister
- Alan McKenna as Alexander Lomaia, Georgian Representative to the U.N.
- Malkhaz Abuladze as Mayor of Tbilisi, Giorgi Ugulava
- Marshall Manesh as Lech Kaczyński, President of Poland, Chairman of the delegation leaders of the former Eastern bloc
- Givi Sikharulidze as Valdas Adamkus, President of Lithuania
- Zura Tsintsqiladze as Valdis Zatlers, President of Latvia

== Production ==
Filming started in October 2009, in Tbilisi. Filming took 36 days with a budget of 12 million dollars. According to Georgian President Mikheil Saakashvili, the film was not financed by the Georgian government; however one of the producers, David Imedashvili, said that the initial funding for the project came from a Georgian government fund. According to Georgian media the movie was financed by Koba Nakopia, a parliamentarian from the ruling United National Movement party of Saakashvili. Also credited as producer are director Renny Harlin, George Lascu and Mirza Davitaia, who served as Georgian State Minister for "diaspora issues" from 2009 to 2012, who at the time of filming was the Georgian Deputy Minister, Ministry of Culture, Monument Protection and Sports.

One of the buildings of the Georgian Presidential administration was used for filming parts of 5 Days of War. Some members of the special effects team were Russian and had previously worked on Night Watch. The military equipment and personnel used in the film were lent by the Georgian army.

== Release ==
The film first premiered in Tbilisi, Georgia on June 5, 2011 and was attended by the participating actors, as well as actress Sharon Stone, who helped raise approximately $1 million during the subsequent fundraiser for the victims of the Russo-Georgian war. The film subsequently premiered in London on June 9, 2011 Georgia on June 6, 2011 the United States on August 19, 2011 and Poland on April 27, 2012

== Reception ==
On review aggregator Rotten Tomatoes, the film holds an approval rating of 34% based on 35 reviews, with an average rating of 4.44/10. On Metacritic, the film has a weighted average score of 31 out of 100, based on 14 critics, indicating "generally unfavorable" reviews. Both Bloomberg and The Washington Post gave it a one-star rating.

5 Days of War opened in limited release in the United States on August 19, 2011 in two theatres in New York City and Washington D.C. It grossed $6,254 in its opening weekend. The film was vehemently denounced by the government of South Ossetia with their Minister of Media Georgiy Kabisov, calling it "Hitler propaganda" and the people that made it as "Nazis." Kabisov also went on to say that the Georgian people and government where "spiteful aggressors" and that the film rejects the "truth" of the war.

== Home media ==
5 Days of War was released on DVD (Region 2) and Blu-ray (Region B) on June 13, 2011. The DVD is a one-disc set. The Blu-ray is a one-disc set that includes DTS-HD 5.1 sound, as well as subtitles, in English, German and French.

== Bibliography ==
- Fedorov, Alexander. The Analysis of Stereotypes of Politically Engaged Media Texts in Media Studies in Student Audience (by the Example of Renny Harlin’s films "Born American" (1986) and "Five Days of War" (2011)
