= Levan Izoria =

Georgian politician (born 1974)

Levan Izoria ლევან იზორია
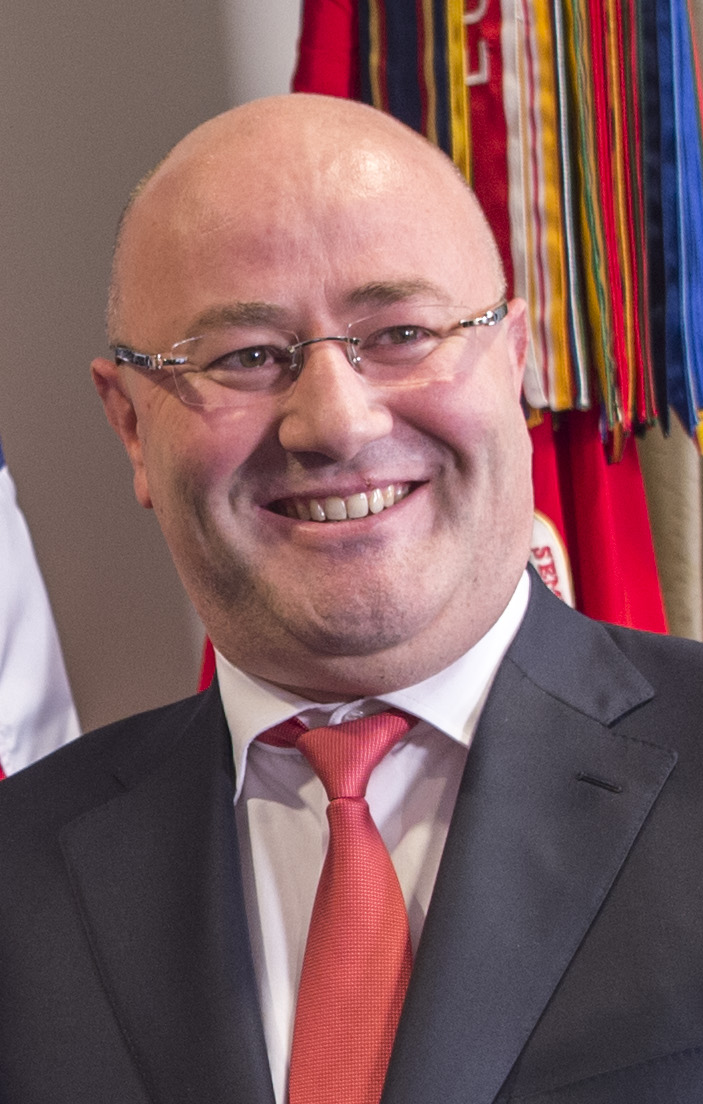
- Izoria in 2017

Georgian Ambassador to Germany
- Incumbent
- Assumed office March 1, 2020
- Prime Minister: Giorgi Gakharia; Irakli Garibashvili
- Preceded by: Elguja Khokrishvili

Head of the Georgian Intelligence Service
- In office September 8, 2019 – January 27, 2020
- Prime Minister: Giorgi Gakharia
- Preceded by: Davit Sujashvili
- Succeeded by: Shalva Lomidze

Secretary of the National Security Council
- In office September 8, 2019 – January 27, 2020
- Prime Minister: Giorgi Gakharia
- Preceded by: Giorgi Gakharia

Minister of Defense
- In office August 1, 2016 – September 8, 2019
- Prime Minister: Giorgi Kvirikashvili; Mamuka Bakhtadze
- Preceded by: Tina Khidasheli
- Succeeded by: Irakli Gharibashvili

Deputy Head of the State Security Service of Georgia
- In office 2015 – August 1, 2016

Deputy Minister of Internal Affairs
- In office 2012–2015

Personal details
- Born: 5 February 1974 (age 52) Tbilisi, Georgian SSR, USSR
- Citizenship: Georgia
- Party: Georgian Dream (2012–present); Free Democrats (2009–2011); United National Movement (formerly)

Levan Izoria (Georgian: ლევან იზორია; born 5 February 1974) is a Georgian politician, Ambassador Extraordinary and Plenipotentiary of Georgia to the Federal Republic of Germany.

== Education and early years ==
Levan Izoria was born in Georgia on February 5, 1974. He graduated from the law faculty of the Ivane Javakhishvili Tbilisi State University (with honors) in 1996 and subsequently completed master's degree at the law faculty of the Georg-August University Göttingen, Germany (with honors) between 1998 and 1999. Levan Izoria holds a PhD degree in law from the Georg-August University Göttingen, Germany (with honors).

In 1992–1995, Levan Izoria worked for Ivane Javakhishvili Tbilisi State University as the chair of Student's Scientific Council and a lecturer of Theory of Law and Constitutional Law (1995–1998). Between 1999 and 2002 Levan Izoria worked as an assistant to the Director of Göttingen State Teaching and Political Science Institute.

== Career ==
=== Scientific and Academic life ===
Since 2002, Levan Izoria was Senior Scientific Officer at T. Tsereteli Law Institute of Science Academy. Between 2002 and 2005, he worked as an assistant-Professor of Law Theory and Constitutional Law Department of law faculty at Ivane Javakhishvili Tbilisi State University.

Izoria was a representative of the German Konrad-Adenauer Political Foundation in the South Caucasus (2003–2004) and Rector of the Academy of the Ministry of Internal Affairs of Georgia (2004–2006).

Between 2006 and 2007, Levan Izoria was the dean and a professor as well as scientific researcher at the law faculty of University of Georgia at University of Georgia. In 2007–2009 worked as the professor at The German Research Institute for Public Administration-speyer (Scholarship of Humboldt Foundation). He served as an associate professor at Georgian-American University (2009–2011) and at Caucasus Law School (2009–2010). Between 2010 and 2011, Izoria conducted academic research at Heidelberg Max Planck Institute for Comparative Public Law and International Law. Between 2011 and 2014, he became a full professor at Grigol Robakhidze University and in 2014–2016 the Academy of the Ministry of Internal Affairs of Georgia.

=== Political career ===
Since 2003, Izoria worked on the reforms of the Ministry of Internal Affairs of Georgia and was the author of Concept of Strategic Development.

Between 2004 and 2006, Levan Izoria was a Rector of the Academy of the Ministry of Internal Affairs of Georgia. His name was related to the reform of Patrol Police of Georgia, which contributed to his status of a reformer. Izoria resigned the abovementioned position in 2006.

Levan Izoria started active political life since 2009, as a member of opposition. He joined political party of Irakli Alasania “Free Democrats” and became the member of political board. Meanwhile, he was one of the active supporter of reorganization and depolarization of Police and in this regard was the author of various projects. Among those projects is “Protected Citizen – Protected Policeman”.

In 2011, Levan Izoria was one of the leaders of coalition “Georgian Dream”. He led the thematic subgroup of National security and Defence group named Law enforcement and Security.

After “Georgian Dream” came to power, Izoria continued working at Law enforcement Ministries. From October 30, 2012 to August 3, 2015, he was a deputy Minister of Internal Affairs of Georgia From August 3, 2015 to August 1, 2016, he hold the position of State Security Service of Georgia.

On August 1, 2016, he was appointed as the Minister of Defence of Georgia. On August 1, 2019, Military Team of the United States Embassy to Tbilisi presented Certificate of Achievement in recognition of successful three-years contribution to the Ministry of Defence of Georgia.

On September 11, 2019, Levan Izoria was appointed as the Head of Georgian Intelligence Service. Parallel to that, on November, 13 – as the Secretary of the National Security Council of Georgia.

On March 1, 2020, Levan Izoria was appointed as the Ambassador Extraordinary and Plenipotentiary of Georgia to the Federal Republic of Germany.

Levan Izoria has a wife and three children.

He speaks English, German and Russian languages.

== Bibliography ==
• "Eigentumsschutz von Grund und Boden, insbesondere im Naturschutzrecht". Cuvillier Verlag, Göttingen, 2002

• "Transformation der Verwaltung Georgiens in eine klassisch-europäische Verwaltung". In: DöV, Stuttgart, 2008

• "Verfassungsentwicklung in Georgien". In: JöR, Tübingen, 2010

• "Development of Democracy in Georgia". Publishing house "BON KAUSA", 2005

• "საქართველოს კონსტიტუციის კომენტარები. ადამიანის ძირითადი უფლებანი და თავისუფლებანი", (co-author), 2005

• "თანამედროვე სახელმწიფო, თანამედროვე ადმინისტრაცია". Publishing house "SIESTA", 2009

• "საქართველოს კონსტიტუციის კომენტარები" (co-author), 2013

• "თავისუფლება — პროცესი სამართლიანობისთვის". Bakur Sulakauri Publishing, 2021

• "Freiheit – Ein Prozess für Gerechtigkeit". Mitteldeutscher Verlag, 2022
