= Mirza Davitaia =

Georgian politician

Mirza (Papuna) Davitaia მირზა (პაპუნა) დავითაია

State Minister on Diaspora Issues
- In office December 21, 2009 – October 25, 2012
- President: Mikheil Saakashvili
- Preceded by: Iulon Gagoshidze
- Succeeded by: Kote Surguladze

Personal details
- Born: August 30, 1975 (age 50) Tbilisi, Georgia

Mirza Davitaia (Georgian: მირზა (პაპუნა) დავითაია; born August 30, 1975) is a Georgian politician who served as the State Minister of Georgia on Diaspora Issues from 2009 to 2012.

== Early years ==
Davitaia was born on August 30, 1975. He graduated from Nuremberg Academy of Fine Arts and Tbilisi State University. In 1993–1994, he worked as the artist-animator in Georgian State Film Production Studio, in 1994–1995 in Cartoon Film in Berlin. Throughout 1995, he worked for Penta TV in Hamburg, from 1996 through 1999, as Arts Director for Intermedien company in Nuremberg. From 1999 until 2002, he was Art and design director at Publicis MSD in Erlangen.

== Political career ==
Davitaia, a member of the United National Movement, was elected deputy to Parliament of Georgia during 2008 parliamentary elections. He was then elected a member to Parliamentary Committee for Relations with Compatriots Residing Abroad. From June 2004 until April 2008, he worked as first the Director of Regions Department, then as Deputy Minister of Ministry of Culture, Monument Protection and Sports. As the Deputy Minister of Culture, he played an important role in the production of the Hollywood made action drama 5 Days of War starring Andy Garcia, Val Kilmer, Heather Graham, Emmanuelle Chriqui.

From December 21, 2009, to October 25, 2012, Davitaia was State Minister of Georgia on Diaspora Issues.

Davitaia is married and has two children.

== See also ==
- Cabinet of Georgia

== See also ==
- List of Georgians
- Cabinet of Georgia
