= Levan Ramishvili =

- ლევან რამიშვილი
- Born: March 28, 1973 (age 53)
- Education: Tbilisi State University (BA, MA, DA); Ilia State University (PhD)
- Occupations: Sociologist, Political Scientist, Journalist, Philosopher, Political Analyst, Activist
- Years active: 1992–present

Levan Ramishvili (Georgian: ლევან რამიშვილი) is a Georgian political activist, philosopher, sociologist, publicist and a key figure in the Liberty Institute, an organization known for its work in promoting civil liberties, democratic reforms, and human rights in Georgia.

== Life and career ==
For several decades, Levan Ramishvili has been an influential journalist, analyst, and activist, playing a pivotal role in the liberal transformation of Georgia. He was a key figure in the country's democracy movement, which successfully used strategic nonviolent action to force the resignation of authoritarian leader Eduard Shevardnadze during the Rose Revolution. Since 1996, Ramishvili has been one of the founders and the director of the Liberty Institute, a Georgian organization dedicated to human rights and public interest advocacy.

In 1992 he got involved with the Center of Social Management at the Cabinet of Ministries. In 1994 he was appointed as a chair of the division of sociology at the International Center for Federal Development of Georgia. He was actively engaged in journalistic work working as a co-editor for newspaper Mimomkhilveli in 1992, co-editor with newspapers: Business Courier (international politics, world economy) 1994 and Argumenti (International reporting, letters to editor) 1995 and 1996. In 1996 and 1997 he worked as a political analyst with the independent TV Channel Rustavi 2.

He is a long-time civil liberties activist, and became involved in civil liberties battles in 1991 as an active member of the student movement for Georgia's Liberation. Later in 1992 he was actively campaigning against the nationalist government of Zviad Gamsakhurdia.

He was actively involved in trainings for civil activists, and in 2003, trained Kmara activists in nonviolent campaigning techniques. He is author of the country's Freedom of Information Law, the law on Freedom of Speech and Expression, law on Broadcasting, student's rights and academic freedom chapter in laws on General Education and Higher Education.

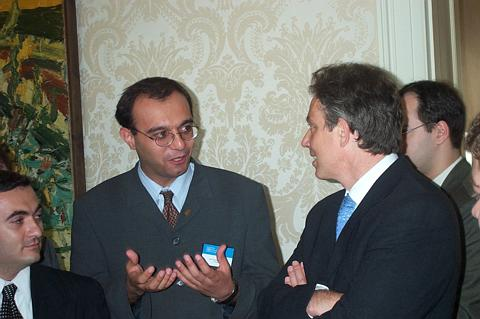
Levan Ramishvili and Tony Blair

Since 2010, Ramishvili has taught various courses in philosophy of law, constitutional law, political theory, and international relations at Free university of Tbilisi and Ilia State University. He has served as the chairman of the board of the Liberty Institute since 1996, an organization dedicated to promoting law and freedom through research and advocacy. Since 2010, Ramishvili has also been the editor of the news and analysis media outlet Tabula. He is the author of numerous laws, including those related to freedom of speech and expression, broadcasting, jury trials in the Criminal Procedure Code, freedom of information in the General Administrative Code, non-commercial legal entities in the Civil Code, rights of pupils, parents, and teachers in the General Education Law, and patient rights.

Over the years, Ramishvili has held various roles, including newspaper columnist, editor of Business Courier and Argument, sociologist at the Social Management Center of the government, head of the Department of the Center for the Development of Federalism, and member of the State Constitutional Commission.

In November 2023, Levan Ramishvili became an associate professor at Free University of Tbilisi.
