= Shalva Lomidze =

Georgian general of intelligence

- შალვა ლომიძე

Head of the Georgian Intelligence Service
- In office April 23, 2021 – April 4, 2024
- Prime Minister: Irakli Garibashvili; Irakli Kobakhidze
- Preceded by: Levan Izoria
- Succeeded by: Irakli Beraia

First Deputy Head of Georgian Intelligence Service
- In office 2014–2020

Personal details
- Born: December 31, 1977 (age 48) Sokhumi, Abkhaz ASSR, Georgia SSR, Soviet Union
- Children: 1
- Education: Academy of the Ministry of State Security of Georgia
- Military career
- Allegiance: Georgia
- Service: Georgian Intelligence Service
- Rank: Major General

Shalva Lomidze (Georgian: შალვა ლომიძე, romanized: Shalva Lomidze; born December 31, 1977) is a major general of intelligence who served as the 8th head of the Georgian Intelligence Service from April 24, 2021 until April 4, 2024, when he was dismissed by Prime Minister Irakli Kobakhidze.

== Career ==
Shalva Lomidze started his career in 1999 on various positions in Counterintelligence Service of the Ministry of State Security of Georgia and in 2004 he continued working in the Counter-Espionage Department of the Ministry of State Security of Georgia.

He joined the Ministry of Internal Affairs of Georgia (MIA) in 2005 and from 2005 to 2012, he held several positions in Counterintelligence Department. In 2012 Lomidze was appointed as the Head of the Main Division of Information-Analytical Department of MIA.

In 2014 he started working in Georgian Intelligence Service (GIS), where he Served as Deputy Head of the Directorate and as Head of Directorate. He became First Deputy Head of Georgian Intelligence Service in 2014 and from 2020 to 2021 he served as acting Head of GIS.

on April 23, 2021, Shalva Lomidze was appointed as the Head of Georgian Intelligence Service.
