= Giga Bokeria =

Georgian politician

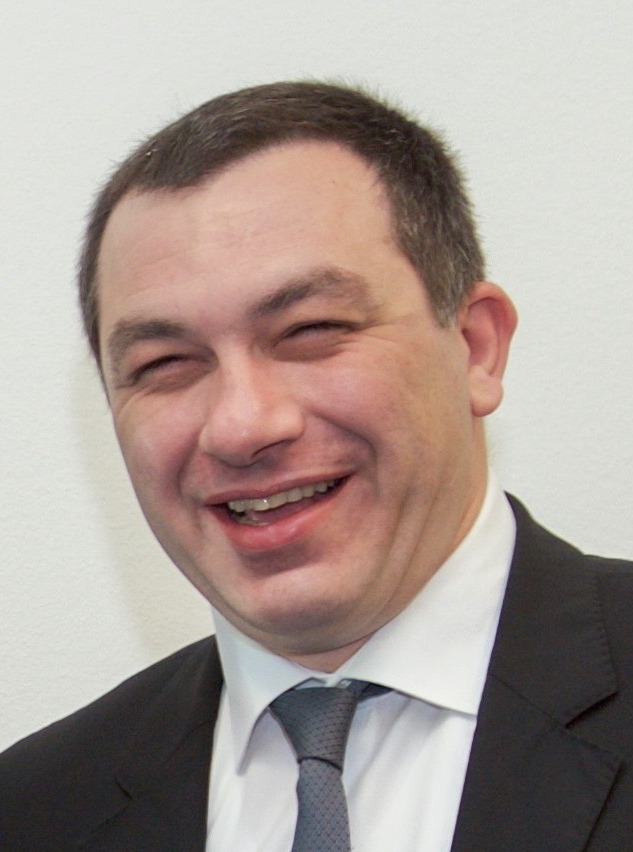
- Bokeria in 2016

Chairman of the Federalists
- Incumbent
- Assumed office 20 October 2024
- Preceded by: position established

Secretary of the National Security Council
- In office 20 November 2010 – 21 November 2013
- President: Mikheil Saakashvili; Giorgi Margvelashvili
- Preceded by: Eka Tkeshelashvili
- Succeeded by: Irina Imerlishvili

Chairman of European Georgia
- In office 10 April 2021 – 1 August 2024
- Preceded by: David Bakradze
- Succeeded by: Gigi Tsereteli

Deputy Chairman of Leader of the Parliamentary Minority
- In office 18 November 2016 – 11 March 2019

Member of the Parliament of Georgia
- In office 18 November 2016 – 11 December 2020
- Parliamentary group: United National Movement (2016–2017); European Georgia (2017–2020)
- In office 22 April 2004 – 7 June 2008
- Parliamentary group: National Movement - Democrats

Personal details
- Born: 20 April 1972 (age 54) Tbilisi, Georgian SSR, Soviet Union
- Party: Federalists (2024–present)
- Other political affiliations: United National Movement (2004–2017); European Georgia (2017–2024)
- Relations: Nana Alexandria (Mother)
- Education: Tbilisi State University

Giorgi (Giga) Bokeria (Georgian: გიორგი (გიგა) ბოკერია, born 20 April 1972 in Tbilisi) is a Georgian politician and was the secretary of the National Security Council of Georgia from November 2010 to November 2013.

== Career ==
From 1989 to 1995, Bokeria was one of the leaders of various student movements, in particular an active member of the Press Club of Tbilisi State University. In 1992, he began working as a journalist, in the newspaper 7 Dge (7 Days), as a political editor of newspaper Mimomkhilveli (Observer) – 1992–1993, journalist with the Pikis Saati (Rush Hour) program of Channel 1 of State Radio −1993, journalist of Radio Liberty – 1994, political editor of newspaper Argumenti (Argument) – 1995–1996, Akcentebi (Accents) talk show host of Rustavi 2 broadcasting company – 1996.

In 1996, together with Levan Ramishvili, Bokeria co-founded the Liberty Institute, a Georgian non-profit, non-partisan, liberal public policy advocacy foundation, taking the job of coordinating human rights programs and later the position of senior legal advisor.

In 2003, after a visit to Serbia to study peaceful revolution techniques, Bokeria helped bring Serb activists from the youth movement Otpor! to Georgia to train students in the same techniques. As a result, the youth movement "Kmara" was established, which played a leading role in the November 2003 Rose Revolution. After the Revolution, Bokeria was elected to Parliament where he has authored a number laws to strengthen human rights in Georgia.

Bokeria was a Member of Parliament from 2004 to 2008. He is the Deputy Chairman of the Committee on Legal Issues and is a Member of Committee on Defense and Security. From 2005 to 2008 he was Vice-President of the Parliamentary Assembly of the Council of Europe (PACE) and he was vice-chairman of the Alliance of Liberals and Democrats for Europe group in the assembly and in 2008 along with United National Movement and later European Georgia - Movement for Liberty he moved to EPP Group. In April 2008, he was moved to the post of deputy Foreign Minister of Georgia, and in November 2010 to Secretary of the National Security Council. He resigned on 15 November 2013 after Georgia elected its new president, Giorgi Margvelashvili. He was succeeded by the Georgian Dream lawmaker Irina Imerlishvili. From 2016 to 2020 he was member of Parliament of Georgia. In 2017 after the split in the United National Movement, together with other former leaders of UNM, Bokeria co-founded the European Georgia - Movement for Liberty party and remained the chairman of the party until his departure in 2024.

== Personal life ==
Bokeria is married to Tamar Chergoleishvili, a former editor-in-chief of the Tbilisi-based magazine Tabula and politician. Bokeria's mother is the chess grandmaster Nana Alexandria.
