= Tamar Chergoleishvili =

Georgian journalist and politician

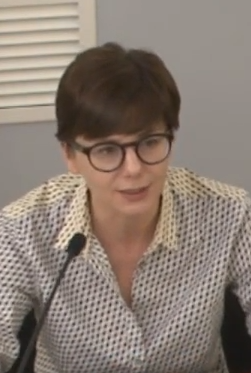
- Chergoleishvili in 2015

Personal details
- Born: May 25, 1975 (age 51) Tbilisi, Georgian SSR, USSR
- Party: European Georgia (2023-2024) Federalists (since 2024)
- Spouse: Giga Bokeria
- Education: Tbilisi State University (BA)

Tamar Chergoleishvili (Georgian: თამარ ჩერგოლეიშვილი, born May 25, 1975, in Tbilisi) is a Georgian journalist and politician. She is founder of online magazine Tabula and co-founder of the Federalists Party.

== Early life and education ==
Born on May 25, 1975, Chergoleishvili graduated in 1997 from the Faculty of International Law and Relations at Tbilisi State University, majoring in international relations.

== Professional career ==
Chergoleishvili began her professional career in the mid-1990s, collaborating with the humanitarian mission of the United Methodist Church from 1996 to 1997. Between 1997 and 1998, she worked for the American Bar Association (ABA), where she was actively involved in the process of judicial reform, the development of judicial ethics, and the creation of legislation regarding freedom of speech. From 1999 to 2000, she cooperated with the United States Department of Justice in the process of prosecution reform in Georgia.

In 2000, she began working for the Council of Europe (CoE), holding various positions over a ten-year tenure. From 2006 to 2010, she served as the head of the CoE legal group. During this period, she played an active role in aligning Georgian legislation with European standards, specifically in the fields of criminal law, economic crime, cybercrime, human rights, and media freedom.

In 2009, she transitioned into media, founding the magazine Tabula, and later launched Tabula Television at the end of 2012, serving as its director and a prominent commentator.

== Political Career ==
In 2023, Chergoleishvili entered politics by joining European Georgia. In August 2024, she left the party along with several colleagues following an internal dispute regarding the party's primary elections and leadership direction in the run-up to the 2024 parliamentary elections.

Following her departure, Chergoleishvili was one of the founders of the Federalists Party in 2024. The party was established in response to what its founders described as democratic backsliding and the concentration of informal power in Georgia. Chergoleishvili has been a key figure in shaping the party’s platform, which emphasizes decentralization, federalism, the rule of law, and a steadfast pro-Western foreign policy.

== Personal life ==
Chergoleishvili is married to Georgian politician Giga Bokeria.
