= David Rakviashvili =

Georgian politician (born 1968)

Datuna Rakviashvili დათუნა რაქვიაშვილი

Secretary of the National Security Council of Georgia
- In office October 2016 – December 2018
- President: Giorgi Margvelashvili
- Preceded by: Irina Imerlishvili
- Succeeded by: Giorgi Gakharia

Deputy Chief of Mission, Embassy of Georgia in Washington, D.C.
- In office February 2011 – July 2013

Deputy Director, Department of International Organizations, Ministry of Foreign Affairs of Georgia
- In office 2010–2011

Deputy State Minister, State Ministry for Reconciliation and Civic Equality of Georgia
- In office January 2008 – December 2010

Personal details
- Born: 16 July 1968 (age 58) Tbilisi, Georgian SSR, Soviet Union (Now Georgia)
- Spouse: Sophio Mamardashvili
- Children: 4
- Education: Ivane Javakhishvili Tbilisi State University

Datuna Rakviashvili (Georgian: დათუნა რაქვიაშვილი; born 16 July 1968) is a Georgian politician. He was a Deputy State Minister at the State Ministry for Reintegration of Georgia from January 2008 to December 2010. From February 2011 to July 2013, he served as a Deputy Chief of Mission at Embassy of Georgia in US. In October 2016, he was appointed as a Secretary of National Security Council of Georgia.

== Early life and career ==
Rakviashvili was born in Tbilisi, the capital of then-Soviet Georgia in 1968. He studied Geography-Geology at the Ivane Javakhishvili Tbilisi State University during 1985–1992, and International Politics at Georgian Institute of Public Affairs (GIPA) -- and mountain guiding at Swiss Mountain Guide School. He was amountaineer carrier and founded and led several groups, including Georgian Mountaineering and Climbing Association (1993-1996), Georgian Mountain Guide School, (1993-2002), Adventure Tourism School (2015-2017); Georgian Mountain Guide Association (GMGA).

Rakviashvili is co-founder and was chairman of the supervisory board of the Georgian Institute of Public Affairs (2008-2010).

In the capacity of Deputy State Minister for Reintegration he participated in the Geneva discussions and in the Incident Prevention and Response Mechanism (IPRM). He was co-chair of the People to People working group of the U.S. - Georgia Strategic Charter. He worked in various Government of Georgia inter-agency working groups, including NSC council inter-agency group on Threat Assessment and Crisis Management Center Development.

Rakviashvili worked on the State Strategy on Occupied Territories: Engagement through Cooperation and Engagement Action Plan and was liaison with local and international NGOs, international organizations, operating in Abkhazia, Georgia and Tskhinvali region/South Ossetia, Georgia. As a Deputy Chief of Mission at the Embassy of Georgia in the US, Rakviashvili was supervising the political and economic departments of the embassy.

== Secretary of the National Security Council of Georgia ==
On October 24, 2016, President Giorgi Margvelashvili appointed David Rakviashvili as the new Secretary of the National Security Council (NSC).

Rakviashvili initiated a shared platform of discussions titled National Security-Whole of a Nation with the goal of increasing broad public involvement in the country's security policy. Discussions were held on February 25, March 15, April 5 and 10 of 2017 throughout various regions of Georgia.
