= Gela Bezhuashvili =

Georgian politician (born 1967)

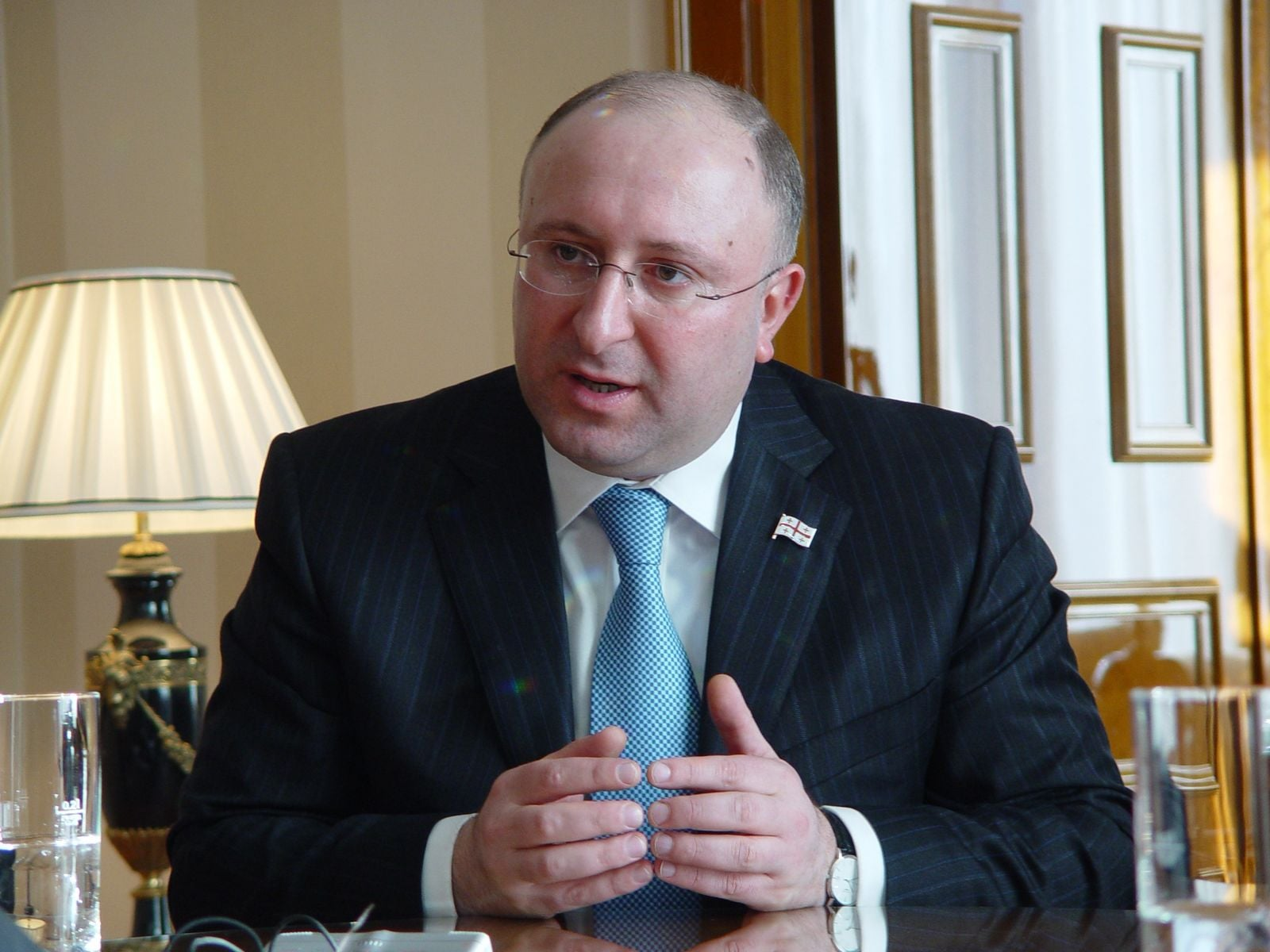

Minister of Foreign Affairs
- In office 19 October 2005 – 31 January 2008
- President: Mikheil Saakashvili; Nino Burjanadze (acting); Mikheil Saakashvili
- Preceded by: Salome Zurabishvili
- Succeeded by: David Bakradze

Minister of Defense
- In office February 17 – June 20, 2004
- Preceded by: David Tevzadze
- Succeeded by: Giorgi Baramidze

Personal details
- Born: March 1, 1967 (age 59) Manglisi, Georgian SSR, Soviet Union
- Education: Taras Shevchenko National University of Kyiv; Southern Methodist University; Harvard University
- Awards: , Order of the Cross of Terra Mariana (III Rank), Vakhtang Gorgasali Order (First Class)

Gela Bezhuashvili (Georgian: გელა ბეჟუაშვილი born March 1, 1967) is a Georgian diplomat and educator, who served as the head of the Georgian Intelligence Service from February 1, 2008 to December 27, 2013. Bezhuashvili was the first civilian Minister of Defence from February 2004 to June 2004, the Secretary of the National Security Council of Georgia from June 2004 to October 2005, and Minister of Foreign Affairs of Georgia from October 19, 2005 to January 31, 2008.

== Education ==
He was born in the townlet of Manglisi, Georgia, in 1967. In 1991, he graduated from the Ukrainian Institute of International Relations and International Law, Kiev State University, Faculty of International Law. In 1997 obtained Master of Law degree, LL.M-International and Comparative Law, Southern Methodist University (SMU) School of Law, Dallas, United States. In 2003 he entered the JFK School of Government, Harvard University as a mid-career student and is a Master of Public Administration (MPA).

== Political and government career ==
Bezhuashvili started his career at the Georgian Foreign Ministry in the early 1990s, including being the Envoy Plenipotentiary and Extraordinary to Kazakhstan between 1993 and 1996. Throughout the 1990s, he was also actively involved in cooperation with the Council of Europe (CoE) and served as a chief negotiator at the accession of Georgia to the CoE in 1999. He then served as deputy Defense Minister from 2000 to 2004, and Defense Minister from February 2004 to June 2004, being the first civilian to be appointed to this post in post-Soviet Georgia. From June 2004 to October 2005, he was the Secretary of the National Security Council of Georgia, and replaced Salome Zourabichvili as Minister of Foreign Affairs on October 19, 2005.

In January 2008, he was replaced with David Bakradze as a foreign minister, and was reported to have decided to quit public life in favour of the private sector. On January 30, 2008, he was appointed a head of the Intelligence Department of Georgia, succeeding Anna Zhvania. Bezhuashvili continued to occupy the office under the new government of Bidzina Ivanishvili and his successor, Irakli Garibashvili, until December 27, 2013, when he was replaced with Davit Sujashvili.

Since 2000, along with his official duties, he was involved in scientific research on International Law issues. He is author of the book "International legal aspects of Georgian Foreign Policy", and a number of articles. He holds the diplomatic rank of Ambassador Extraordinary and Plenipotentiary and the civil service rank of State Chancellor.

Bezhuashvili also led Georgia's delegations to the Black Sea Economic Cooperation (BSEC) high-level meetings in Istanbul, Thessaloniki, and Chișinău in 1999. Between 1997 and 1999, he chaired the national working group on Georgia’s accession to the Council of Europe and was instrumental in drafting key legal documents, including the Law on International Treaties (1997), Law on Diplomatic Service (1999, 2007), Organic Law on the National Security Council (2005), and the Law on Intelligence Service (2010).

== Academic and business involvement ==
In parallel with his public service, Bezhuashvili has been involved in academic research, teaching, and publishing, especially in the field of international law. In 2017-2019 he was teaching at the Georgian Institute of Public Affairs (GIPA) course The Art of Governance.

He has also held a number of positions in the private sector and international advisory roles. Since 2014, he has served as a non-Executive Director and Managing Board Member of GIG Holding, and is a Member of the International Advisory Council at Fundação Dom Cabral Business School in Brazil. From 2015 to 2017, he was chairman of the Supervisory Board at Heidelberg Cement Georgia.

He is the founder, chairman, and CEO of the David Bezhuashvili Education Foundation, a non-profit organization focused on youth education and development, and has served as Chairman of the Supervisory Board of the European School in Tbilisi since 2015.

He has been a member of the International Advisory Board at San Diego State University (USA/Georgia campus), the Advisory Board of CSGS at American University in Dubai, and the International Industrial Advisory Board at the University of York Europe Campus in Thessaloniki, Greece.

Since 2022, he has been an Advisory Board member of Strategy International, a consulting firm and think tank based in Nicosia, Cyprus. In 2023, he joined the Supervisory Board of the American University in Kyiv, and in 2025, he became the Chairman of the Supervisory Board of East-West Teaching University in Tbilisi, as well as a board member at the American Technology University in Tashkent and the SABADO Leadership Academy in Georgia.

== Awards and honors ==
Bezhuashvili holds the highest diplomatic rank of Ambassador Extraordinary and Plenipotentiary and the civil service rank of State Chancellor.

In 2004, he was named "Man of the Year" by the American Biographical Institute. In 2006, he was awarded the Order of Merit, First Rank by the President of Ukraine for his contributions to bilateral relations and international diplomacy. In 2007, he received the Order of the Cross of Terra Mariana (III Rank), Estonia’s highest state honor.

In 2008, he was proclaimed a Charter Member of the Leading Intellectuals of the World by the American Biographical Institute for his work on defense reforms, civil oversight of the military, and institutional modernization. The same year, he was also declared a Distinguished Member of the American Hall of Fame for his inspirational leadership and public service.

In 2013, he was awarded the Vakhtang Gorgasali Order (First Class), one of Georgia’s highest honors.

== Personal life ==
Bezhuashvili is married and has two sons and one daughter. He speaks Georgian, English, Russian and Spanish.

Political offices
| Preceded by David Tevzadze | Minister of Defense of Georgia; February 17, 2004 – June 10, 2004 | Succeeded by Giorgi Baramidze |
| Preceded by Salome Zourabichvili | Minister of Foreign Affairs of Georgia; October 19, 2005 – January 31, 2008 | Succeeded by David Bakradze |
| Preceded by Anna Zhvania | Head of Georgian Intelligence Service; February 1, 2008 – December 27, 2013 | Succeeded by Davit Sujashvili |
