= Georgian Intelligence Service =

Georgian governmental intelligence agency

- საქართველოს დაზვერვის სამსახური
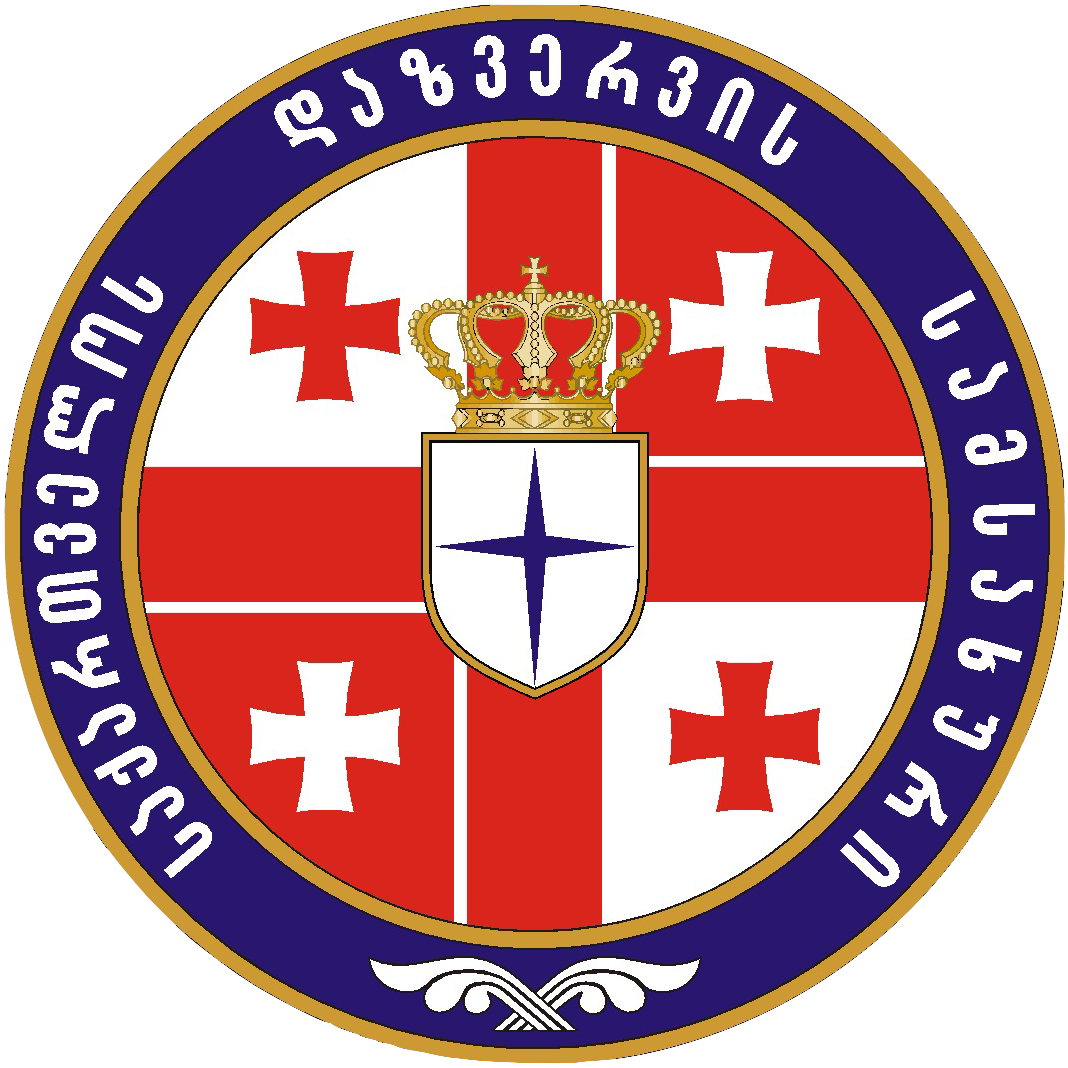
- Emblem of the Georgian Intelligence Service

- Flag of the Georgian Intelligence Service

Agency overview
- Formed: September 19, 1997; 29 years ago
- Headquarters: 51/53 Unknown Heroes' St., Tbilisi, Georgia
- Agency executive: Irakli Beraia, Chief of the Georgian Intelligence Service
- Website: www.gis.gov.ge

The Georgian Intelligence Service (GIS) (Georgian: საქართველოს დაზვერვის სამსახური, sakartvelos dazvervis samsakhuri) is a national intelligence agency of Georgia, with its headquarters in Tbilisi. The current chief of the service is Irakli Beraia, appointed in 2024.

The GIS is directly subordinated to the Prime Minister of Georgia. It is responsible for providing national security intelligence assessment and conducting counter-intelligence duties abroad.

== History ==
After the declaration of independence from the Soviet Union in 1991, Georgia established its own intelligence agency, the Service for Information and Intelligence (საინფორმაციო–სადაზვერვო სამსახური), on the basis of the Soviet-era Committee for State Security. The Georgian KGB was notable in that it was considered to be one of the most effective of the KGB's regional Soviet branches, under the command of Aleksi Inauri and Givi Gumbaridze for most of its existence.

From 1993 to 1997, the SII functioned as the Chief Directorate for Foreign Intelligence (საგარეო დაზვერვის მთავარი სამმართველო) under the Ministry for State Security. On September 19, 1997, the agency was transformed into an independent State Intelligence Department (დაზვერვის სახელმწიფო დეპარტამენტი), with two regional divisions for Adjara and Abkhazia. Being briefly under the Ministry for State Security from 2004 to 2005, the agency was again made independent as the Foreign Intelligence Special Service (საგარეო დაზვერვის სპეციალური სამსახური) on January 24, 2005.

The current name was adopted in compliance with the new intelligence legislation passed in the Parliament of Georgia on April 27, 2010.

== Structure ==
The GIS consists of five principal subdivisions. These are:

- Analytical Directorate
- Information Directorate
- Security Directorate
- Administrative Directorate
- Training Center

== Chiefs of Georgian intelligence agency (1997–present) ==
- Avtandil Ioseliani (September 1997 – February 2004)
- Valeri Chkheidze (February–June 2004)
- Batu Kutelia (June–October 2004)
- Anna Zhvania (October 2004 – February 2008)
- Gela Bezhuashvili (February 2008 – December 2013)
- Davit Sujashvili (December 2013 – September 2019)
- Levan Izoria (September 2019 – 2020)
- Shalva Lomidze (February 2020- April 3, 2024)
- Irakli Beraia (April 5, 2024- present)
