= Dedoplis Mindori =

- დედოფლის მინდორი (Georgian)
- Location within Georgia
- 42.046850°N 43.860486°E
- Location: Kareli Municipality; Shida Kartli, Georgia

Immovable Cultural Monument of National Significance of Georgia
- Type: Archaeological
- Designated: 2007

Dedoplis Mindori (Georgian: დედოფლის მინდორი, romanized: dedoplis mindori, literally, "the queen's meadow") is an archaeological site in Georgia's east-central region of Shida Kartli, at the confluence of eastern and western Prone, tributaries of the Kura. A multi-layer site, it has yielded some Acheulean and Mousterian stone tools, burials from the Late Bronze to the Iron ages, and several settlements and burials from the Classical Antiquity and Middle Ages. Of particular importance is a substantial complex of what once were religious buildings, dated to the 2nd–1st century BC, and inscribed on the list of the Immovable Cultural Monuments of National Significance. The Dedoplis Mindori plain is adjoined by a group of mounds, known as Aradetis Orgora, where archaeological finds span several periods of local culture sequence, from the Chalcolithic to the Early Middle Ages.

== Overview ==
Dedoplis Mindori is a gently sloping plain at the confluence of eastern and western Prone, tributaries of the Kura, occupying an area of approximately 25 km^{2}, some 3 km west of the village of Aradeti, Kareli Municipality. At its southern edge, where the river Ptsa joins the Kura near the village of Doghlauri, there is Aradetis Orgora, a group of three mounds, the dominant of which is known as Dedoplis Gora ("the queen's hill") and rises to 34 m above the river. A series of archaeological reconnaissance surveys explored both the plain and mounds in the 1950s and 1960s, but systematic archaeological study of the area was undertaken under the direction of Iulon Gagoshidze from 1972 to 1982. The excavations revealed an extensive complex of religious buildings at Dedoplis Mindori and a palace complex at Dedoplis Gora. Digs at Aradetis Orgora are ongoing, as part of the Georgian–Italian Shida Kartli Archaeological Project, a collaboration of the Georgian National Museum and Ca' Foscari University of Venice launched in 2009.

The Dedoplis Mindori sanctuary is unknown from written history. According to its excavator, Iulon Gagoshidze, it might have served as one of the principal pre-Christian shrines, and probably a royal one, of the ancient kingdom of Kartli, known to the Classical world as Iberia. The temples are dated by archaeologists to the 2nd–1st century BC. In the later 1st century AD, the complex was destroyed by fire. This dating is supported by combined archaeological evidence from a palace complex at nearby Dedoplis Gora: pottery, imported bronze-ware from the Roman Empire, and the radiocarbon analysis of grain stores. Arrowheads found in the destruction deposits suggest the fire was the result of a military conflict.

== Layout ==
The middle portion of the Dedoplis Mindori plain is occupied by a complex of religious buildings, with the total area of 4 ha (225 × 180 m). The complex consists of eight temples, two gateways, dwellings, and other accessory structures, built simultaneously according to a well-designed uniform rectangular plan. The buildings, oriented south–north, surround a central square courtyard, measuring 105 × 103 m. They had mudbrick walls, with cobblestone socles and, with the exception of the main temple, were roofed with terracotta tiles. Wooden columns of the temples and gateways were crowned with sandstone capitals, adorned with elaborate carvings.

The main temple is located at the southern end of the complex. With a columned hall as a central architectural element, its design is inspired by an Achaemenid architectural tradition. Its large open columned portico and square cella are surrounded by an ambulatory on three sides. At the north end of the building there is a two-column portico with a balcony. The cella, with the area of 300 sq. m, housed an altar under a cupola, supported by four columns; its mudbrick podium has survived. The walls of the temple had been plastered and adorned with murals. A smaller temple of similar design lies at the northern edge of the courtyard, with an ambulatory and a tiled pitched roof, which gives it a "Hellenistic" appearance. Six more, architecturally simpler places of worship are nearby, each having an open portico connected to a square cella with a doorway. The religious buildings are surrounded by the contemporaneous dwellings, probably for those who served at the sanctuary. Further 400 m north-west, there are remnants of a settlement of construction workers and craftsmen as well as a clay pit, with a number of discarded and broken pottery.
