= Koba Nakopia =

Georgian businessman and politician

Member of the Parliament of Georgia
- Incumbent
- Assumed office 18 November 2016
- In office 7 June 2008 – 18 November 2016
- Preceded by: Sophio Lartsuliani
- Succeeded by: Goga Meshveliani
- Constituency: Bolnisi

Personal details
- Born: 22 February 1969 (age 57) Gali (Abkhazian ASSR)
- Party: United National Movement
- Education: Tbilisi State University; Diplomatic Academy of the MFA of Russia

Koba Nakopia (Georgian: კობა ნაყოფია; born 22 February 1969) is a Georgian businessman and politician who has served as a member of Parliament since 2008 and as Chairman of the Political Council of the United National Movement since January 2022.

Studying in Tbilisi and Moscow, he launched a private career in the 1990s in Russia, involved in several investment companies that would eventually allow him to hold several portfolios in Georgia. The largest one of them was the privatized Madneuli gold mine and Nakopia rapidly became one of the largest mining magnates in the country, founding GeoProMining, a company holding mining interests in Georgia, Russia, and Armenia.

His political career began with his election to represent the Bolnisi Majoritarian District in Parliament in 2008 as the United National Movement's nominee. He would be reelected in Bolnisi in 2012, and then would remain in Parliament through UNM's electoral list. One of the party's wealthiest members, he has been a large financial donor of the Georgian opposition and has served several leadership positions, the latest being Chairman of the party's Political Council since 2022, the position he left early 2023.

== Early life and education ==
Koba Nakopia was born on 22 February 1969 in Gali, a town at the time in the Autonomous Soviet Socialist Republic of Abkhazia. Graduating from the Third Secondary School of Gali, he has to this day a house in the town, although it is located in the separatist republic of Abkhazia, under Russian military occupation.

In 1993, he graduated from Tbilisi State University with a major in statistics and a minor in business law. Until 1995, he received a doctorate in economic science from the same institution, after which he moved to Moscow to study at the Diplomatic Academy of the Ministry of Foreign Affairs of the Russian Federation. According to an interview he would later give, he first traveled outside of the Soviet Union in 1991 when he traveled to Vienna.

Koba Nakopia has two sons. His oldest, Nikoloz, has been closely associated with his father's companies and is married to model and Miss Georgia 2009 winner Nanuka Gogichaishvili.

== Private sector ==
Having moved to Moscow to study at the Diplomatic Academy of Russia, he would become an adviser to the International Economic Committee of the Russia-led Commonwealth of Independent States from 1996 to 1999, a period that coincided with attempts to integrate the economies of CIS member states through a treaty that came into force in 1998.

In 2003 he joined the Supervisory Board of the Zestaponi Ferroalloy Factory at a time when the plant was undergoing a restructuring. In 2004, the firm purchased the state-owned Madneuli goldmine in Georgia, of which Nakopia became General Director and Board chairman until 2008. He would maintain large shares in the company until the fall of 2011, selling it at the same time as the Georgian Ministry of Natural Resources' decision to revoke up to 37 mining licenses from the company. Also in 2004, he became Chairman of Quartzite LLC.

Nakopia's largest investments have remained in the mining industry. He founded Bioneli Limited in 2008, a company registered in the British Virgin Islands and a majority shareholder of the RMG Gold company. He also owns GoldInvest Sakartvelo since 2006, which owns Zarapxana, one of Georgia's largest jewelry store networks. He owns two mines in Armenia, including the Agarak Copper-Molybdenum Combine, which has been accused of several environmental and labor rights violations, and the Ararat Gold Refinery.

Koba Nakopia's portfolio has also largely involved the entertainment and media industries. In 2009 he was a producer of the movie 5 Days of War, a Hollywood production portraying the 2008 Russo-Georgian War. His family owns 50% of LTD Sakartvelo, itself a majority shareholder of the Rustavi 2 television channel until the European Court of Human Rights authorized the Georgian government's decision to transfer its ownership in 2019. After this, Sakartvelo became a founding investor of Mtavari TV, a leading opposition-leaning television channel in Georgia.

== Political career ==
=== As Bolnisi Majoritarian ===
During the 2008 parliamentary election, Koba Nakopia was nominated by President Mikheil Saakashvili's United National Movement (UNM) to run in the Bolnisi Majoritarian District, replacing incumbent Sophio Lartsuliani who had previously announced her intention to run for reelection. He would easily win in the first round with 83% of the vote and became one of Saakashvili's closest confidants, while he remained heavily involved in the private sector. He was awarded the Order of Excellence in 2010 for "patriotism and the introduction of new standards in Georgian business".

Nakopia was nominated for reelection in Bolnisi during the 2012 parliamentary election, facing Georgian Dream's Darejan Ckhetiani in a close campaign that saw Speaker Davit Bakradze stump for him in Bolnisi, while civil society organizations accused the Bolnisi Municipality of using administrative resources to help him. He won with close to 68% of the vote in the first round, although UNM lost nationwide, making him an opposition leader. A report by media agency Netgazeti revealed in 2016 that Nakopia had been one of the least active members of Parliament, not voting a single time since 2013 and missing key bills, including the 2014 Anti-Discrimination Act and that same year's ratification of the EU-Georgia Association Agreement, despite his pledge to back all pro-European integration documents.

=== Third and fourth terms as MP ===
In the 2016 parliamentary election, Koba Nakopia was nominated by UNM to run in another constituency, the Senaki Majoritarian District, where he faced Gaeorgian Dream's Irakli Beraia, a State Security Service official. He won 30.7% of the vote in the first round and lost in the runoff to Beraia with only 24.7%. He nonetheless won a seat in Parliament by being in 16th position on the party's electoral list. In January 2017, he was one of six UNM MPs that opted to remain in the party after a major split caused a majority of the party's elected officials to create the European Georgia party.

On 15 October 2017 Koba Nakopia was prevented from entering Ukraine and subsequently banned for a period of three years, a short time after a political fallout between Ukrainian President Petro Poroshenko and Saakashvili that led to the deportation of several high-ranking Georgian-born Ukrainian officials. His entry ban was lifted after the election of [[Volodymyr Zelenskyy]] and Nakopia visited Ukraine in May 2021 along with UNM chairman Nika Melia and once again in April 2022 with former Georgian President Giorgi Margvelashvili to show support for Kyiv facing the Russian invasion, visiting Bucha, meeting with Ukrainian officials, and with members of the Georgian Legion.

In the 2020 parliamentary election he was placed in 5th position on the UNM electoral list and won a fourth term, although massive voter fraud allegations led Nakopia and 48 other MPs to refuse to recognize the electoral results and boycott their seats in Parliament. He was staunchly critical of the authorities after the subsequent arrest of Nika Melia, calling charges against him "politically motivated" and visiting him in jail. In the midst of negotiations between Georgian Dream and the opposition facilitated by Western ambassadors, he met on a personal basis with the facilitators but was originally opposed to UNM joining the negotiating sides as long as long as its chairman remained in jail. Nakopia accepted his parliamentary seat in May 2021 after the sides struck a short-lived agreement. Political tensions reemerged when former President Saakashvili returned to Georgia and was arrested in October 2021, with Nakopia calling for his release, visiting him several times in prison and criticizing the restrictions imposed on Saakashvili's mail delivery, the ban on his phone calls, and the removal of windows from his cell.

He is a member of the Diaspora and Caucasus Committee and serves on the Georgian delegation of the Georgia-Moldova-Ukraine Parliamentary Assembly.

=== UNM Leadership ===
Koba Nakopia remained largely active in the party's work in the Samegrelo region, himself originally from neighboring Abkhazia. In May 2019, he led protests calling for the resignation of Miranda Meskhi, the chair of the District Election Commission of Zugdidi that had admitted delivering voter lists to precincts days before the special local election in which he had endorsed former First Lady Sandra Roelofs. During the 2020 parliamentary election, he backed Giuli Alasania, mother of Saakashvili, as a candidate for the Zugdidi Majoritarian District, although the party eventually nominated Anzor Melia. He himself ran for Mayor of Senaki in 2021 against three other candidates, including Georgian Dream's Vakhtang Gadelia, whom he came on top of in the first round but lost to in the runoff. During that election, Prime Minister Irakli Gharibashvili campaigned for Gadelia and delivered a controversial speech threatening to block local projects in the event of a victory by Nakopia, a statement that would be heavily criticized as authoritarian by civil society organizations.

Koba Nakopia was elected to the Political Council of UNM following the European Georgia split in January 2017. On 25 March 2019, he was elected as Executive Secretary of the party. On 10 January 2022, he became Chairman of the Political Council of the party, a post traditionally held by the party's chairman. His election to that position has been interpreted by many political observers as part of an intra-partisan struggle against Nika Melia, a charge Melia denied. At the helm of the Political Council, he has been in charge of organizing the special election for the party's chairmanship scheduled for January 2023, in which he has endorsed Nika Melia for reelection.

Following the election of Levan Khabeishvili as chair of UNM on 30 January 2023, Nakopia announced he would not seek reelection as chair of the party's political council, but stated he would remain a member of the party "as long as Mikheil Saakashvili remains in prison". Though selected by the new party leadership to sit on the party's new Political Council, he refused to take his mandate, in opposition to the new chairman.
