= Gela Dumbadze =

Georgian diplomat

Gela Dumbadze (გელა დუმბაძე)

Georgian Ambassador to Ukraine
- Incumbent
- Assumed office 15 June 2017

State Minister of Diaspora Issues
- President: Giorgi Margvelashvili
- Prime Minister: Irakli Garibashvili; Giorgi Kvirikashvili
- Preceded by: Konstantine Surguladze
- Succeeded by: Position abolished

Personal details
- Born: 12 June 1965 (age 61) Tbilisi, Georgian SSR, Soviet Union
- Education: Tbilisi State University; Diplomatic Academy of Georgia

Gela Dumbadze (Georgian: გელა დუმბაძე; born 12 June 1965) is a Georgian diplomat. He is serving as Ambassador Extraordinary and Plenipotentiary of Georgia to Ukraine since June 15, 2017. He was the State Minister of Georgia for Diaspora Issues from 2014 to 2016.

== Biography ==
He was born in Tbilisi on June 12, 1965 and studied in N55 Tbilisi Public School. In 1989 he graduated from Ivane Javakhishvili Tbilisi State University, Philological Department (Diploma with Honour). From 1999 to 2001 he studied at the Diplomatic Academy of Georgia.

From 1987 to 1989 he was the founder and the chairman of the Youth Association for the Protection of Monuments. In 1989 he founded the Children's Aesthetic and Educational School and was the director from the day of foundation until 1996.

From 1998 to 1999 he worked as a First Secretary of the Department of Information and Public Relations of the Ministry of Foreign Affairs of Georgia, and in 1999-2000 was the Head of the Press Center. From 2000 to 2001 he was transferred to the post of Deputy Director of the Department of Foreign Policy Information and Public Relations in the Ministry of Foreign Affairs of Georgia.

From 2001 to 2005 he served as a Counselor at the Embassy of Georgia to the Republic of Azerbaijan. From 2005 to 2007 he was Head of the Department for Cultural Heritage and Relations with the Diaspora, and from 2007 to 2009 he was a Counselor at the Embassy of Georgia in the Russian Federation. From 2009 to 2013 he worked as a Senior Counselor at the Georgian Embassy to Ukraine. From 2013 to 2014 he served as Charge d'Affaires a.i. in Uzbekistan and Tajikistan.

From 2 June 2014 to 22 July he hold the position of Deputy State Minister for Diaspora Issues of Georgia, and on July 26, 2014 he was appointed to the post of the State Minister of Georgia for Diaspora Issues. From 2014 to 2016 he presided in the Commission on the return of the estate in France purchased by the Government of the Democratic Republic of Georgia. On September 23, 2016, he signed the Act on the Return of the Le Ville estate to Georgia. In 2016, he was awarded Ivane Javakhishvili medal for his contribution to the return of the Le Ville estate to Georgia.

Since June 15, 2017 he holds the position of Ambassador Extraordinary and Plenipotentiary of Georgia to Ukraine and is the Permanent Representative of Georgia to the Organization for Democracy and Economic Development (GUAM).

He is the author of the collection of short stories: "The Yellow Trolleybus", "I - the runner" and "I Love Apples". He is also a member of the "Art Gallery Line" art gallery.

Gela Dumbadze is Married and has a daughter. He speaks English and Russian.
