= Teona Akubardia =

Georgian politician

Teona Akubardia (Georgian: თეონა აქუბარდია; born 9 October 1978 in Tbilisi) is a Georgian politician. Since 2020, she is member of Parliament of Georgia by party list, from bloc "Giorgi Vashadze – Strategy Aghmashenebeli".

She has boycotted parliament (with her party and opposition) due to alleged election fraud.

From 2014 to 2018, Akubardia served as the deputy secretary of Georgia's National Security Council. She is a co-founder of Georgian Strategic Analysis Center. In 2020 she joined Strategy Aghmashenebeli and was elected in parliament for that party during the 2020 Georgian parliamentary election. In October 2022 she left the party and became an independent MP. In August 2024 she decided to join For Georgia for the 2024 Georgian parliamentary election, commenting that without the active involvement of this party led by Giorgi Gakharia it would be impossible to defeat Bidzina Ivanishvili.
