= GIG Holding =

- Trade name: GIG Holding
- Native name: ჯიაიჯი ჰოლდინგი
- Type: Private
- Industry: Conglomerate, Energy, Manufacturing, Real estate, Insurance, Healthcare, Education
- Incorporated: Georgia
- Founded: 1994; 32 years ago in Tbilisi, Georgia
- Founder: David Bezhuashvili
- Headquarters: Tbilisi, Georgia, Tbilisi, Georgia
- Area served: Georgia, Ukraine, Kazakhstan, Uzbekistan, United Arab Emirates
- Key people: David Bezhuashvili (Founder)
- Products: Energy, Real estate, Insurance, Healthcare, Education, Pharmaceuticals, Machinery, Cement
- Number of employees: 10,000+ (2025)
- Website: gig.ge

GIG Holding (Georgian: ჯიაიჯი ჰოლდინგი) is a Georgian multi-industry holding company with diversified operations in energy (thermal and renewable energy), logistics and transport, machinery manufacturing, agriculture, pharmaceutical production, healthcare and insurance, cement production, real estate, and education.

Headquartered in Tbilisi, Georgia, the company has played a notable role in the country’s economic development and expanded its presence across the wider region. Through investments and industrial partnerships, GIG Holding operates in Georgia, Ukraine, Kazakhstan, Uzbekistan, and the United Arab Emirates.

== Business activities ==
GIG Holding’s operations span a broad range of sectors:

- Energy – The holding owns and operates thermal and hydroelectric power plants that supply electricity to domestic and regional markets. It is also involved in energy trading and distribution.
- Real estate – Through its real estate arm, the company develops commercial and residential properties.
- Insurance – GIG owns one of Georgia’s leading insurance companies, offering life, health, and property coverage.
- Healthcare – GIG Holding operates 25 regional clinics and hospitals in Georgia, providing inpatient and outpatient services across five regions.
- Education – GIG Holding owns a premium private international school and holds shares in universities in Georgia, Ukraine, and Uzbekistan in partnership with Arizona State University (United States).
- Pharmacy – Holding operates a pharmaceutical company in Ukraine, specializing in the production of insulin and heparin.
- Agricultural and special-purpose equipment – GIG Holding owns agricultural equipment manufacturing companies in Kazakhstan. These companies are market leaders in the production and sales of tractors, combines and other specialized machinery.
- Infrastructure – In 2020, GIG Holding won an open tenderin partnership with a Ukrainian company, won a concession to operate the Kherson Sea Port.
- Industrial production – Within Georgia, the company produces materials used in railway, infrastructure, construction, and furniture manufacturing. In cooperation with other firms, GIG operates the country’s only clinker plant and its largest cement production facility.

== History ==
GIG Holding was established in 1994 by David Bezhuashvili. Initially focused on acquiring and consolidating industrial assets, the company expanded into the cement acquiring the Rustavi and Kaspi cement plants. The company later bought the Tbilisi Thermal Power Plant and entered the natural gas market through ownership of the Georgian International Energy Corporation.

In the early 2000s, the company formalized its structure as GIG Holding to manage its growing portfolio.

Domestically, it strengthened its healthcare network with 25 regional clinics and continued real estate development projects. GIG Holding entered new renewable energy ventures in Georgia (including hydropower, wind and solar projects), and expanded its work in agribusiness and higher education. The company continues to manage Georgia’s largest cement operations and remains active in regional electricity trade.

GIG Holding has launched several major projects internationally as well. The company began operating the Kherson Sea Port in Ukraine.

== Economic impact ==
GIG Holding is among Georgia’s largest private-sector employers, with a workforce exceeding 10,000 people in Georgia and abroad. The holding contributes to national industry through its energy generation, cement production, and manufacturing activities. Its energy production and trading activities also play a role in Georgia’s energy security and electricity exchanges with neighboring states. The company’s export-oriented operations include cement and agricultural machinery production for regional markets, and pharmaceutical exports from Ukraine.

== Corporate social responsibility and philanthropy ==
GIG Holding emphasizes workforce development and community engagement. It supports initiatives in education, healthcare, and regional development. In 2015, David Bezhuashvili and his family founded the David Bezhuashvili Education Foundation, which focuses on fostering education, research, and cultural heritage projects in Georgia. Although the foundation operates independently from GIG Holding, it reflects the broader philanthropic vision of the Bezhuashvili family to promote knowledge-based national development.

== See also ==
- Economy of Georgia (country)
- Energy in Georgia (country)
