= Liberty Institute (Georgia) =

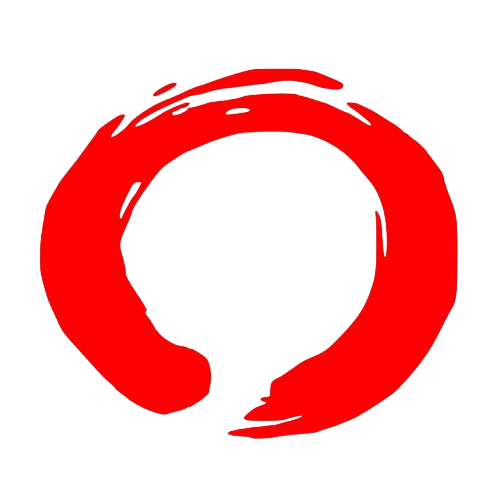
Logo of Liberty Institute

Liberty Institute is a Georgian research and advocacy organization affiliated with Ilia Chavchavadze State University. The Institute provides legal services in the field of civil and human rights and conducts legislative activities.

== History ==
The Liberty Institute was founded in 1996.

On July 10, 2002, around 10 aggressors entered the office of the Liberty Institute and physically injured organization members Sozar Subari and ransacked the office.

Giga Bokeria became the deputy chairman of the Committee on Legal Issues and a member of the Committee on Defense and Security. Givi Targamadze became the chair of the Georgian Parliamentary Committee on Defense and Security. In 2004, Sozar Subari was elected by the Parliament of Georgia as Public Defender (ombudsman) for a 5-year term.

Konstantine Vardzelashvili was appointed as the Deputy Minister of Justice in 2004. Anna Zhvania was appointed initially as an advisor to the President in 2006, and then she was appointed as the first female head of the Foreign Intelligence Special Service of Georgia. Former executive director of the Liberty Institute, Akaki Minashvili, was elected to the Parliament of Georgia. In December 2008, he was elected as chairman of the Committee on Foreign Affairs. Before that, he was the deputy chairman of the Committee on Legal Issues.

== Activities ==
In February 2003, a constitutional amendment backed by the Liberty Institute was adopted to introduce trial by jury in Georgia. In 1998–2000, anti-corruption campaigns by the Institute have been against the illegal business activities of then President Eduard Shevardnadze's family.

Since 2001, the Liberty Institute has carried out the anti-corruption campaign at the Tbilisi Ivane Javakhishvili State University. The LI denounced the attack on the Baptist Church by police in the Tianeti region. The Liberty Institute also created the youth movement Kmara in 2003 in Georgia. The Law on the Freedom of Speech and Expression adopted by the Parliament of Georgia in 2004 was prepared by the LI. In 2004, the Parliament of Georgia adopted the Law on Broadcasting.

The Liberty Institute has a monthly magazine, Liberty.
