= Alexander Lomaia =

Georgian politician (born 1963)

- ალექსანდრე ლომაია
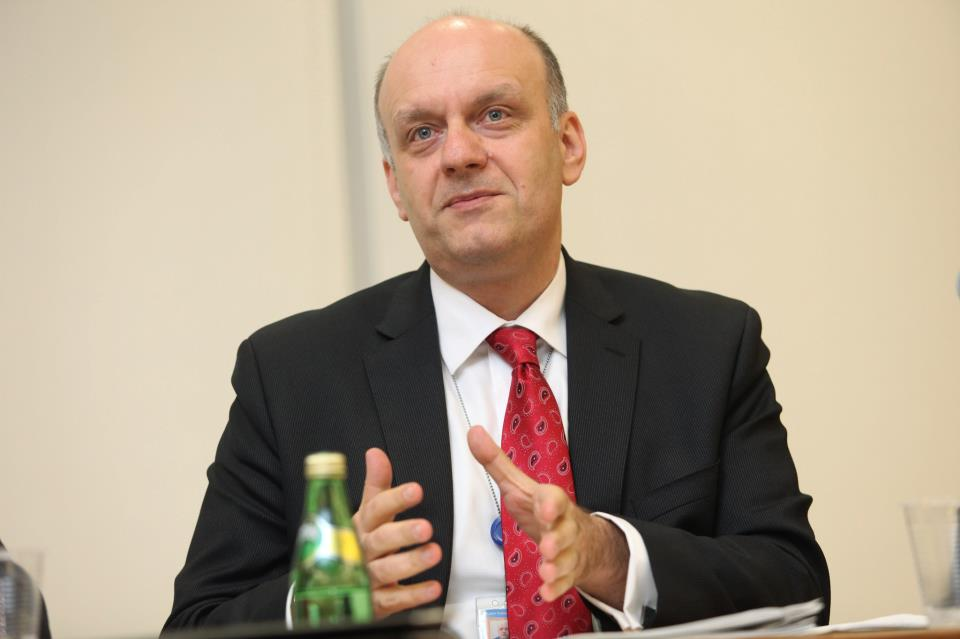

Ambassador of Georgia to The United Nations
- In office January 1, 2009 – October 27, 2012
- President: Mikheil Saakashvili
- Succeeded by: Kakha Imnadze

Minister of Education and Science
- In office 2004–2007

Secretary of the National Security Council of Georgia
- In office November 2007-December 2008

Ambassador of Georgia to Russia
- In office 1991

Personal details
- Born: July 27, 1963 (age 63) Tbilisi, Georgian SSR, Soviet Union
- Education: Moscow Civil Engineering Institute (doctorate)
- Awards

Alexander "Kakha" Lomaia (Georgian: ალექსანდრე [კახა] ლომაია; born 1963) is a Georgian politician who was Permanent Representative of Georgia to the United Nations from January 2009 to October 2012. His prior appointments in the government of Georgia included Minister of Education and Science and Secretary of the National Security Council of Georgia.

== Professional career ==
Lomaia briefly served as the Ambassador of Georgia to Russia in 1991. From 1993 to 1995, he was the Secretary General of the Georgian Christian-Democratic Union. Between 1995 and 2002, he worked for the Georgia Office of the Eurasia Foundation, first as a Programme Officer and then as Country Director. Later, he served as a Regional Director for the Democracy Coalition Project in the territories of the former Soviet Union, based in Tbilisi, from 2002 to 2003. From 2003 to 2004, he was the executive director of the Open Society Georgia Foundation (Soros Foundation).

Lomaia played a prominent role in the peaceful Rose Revolution which ousted President of Georgia Eduard Shevardnadze in November 2003. He was appointed the Minister of Education and Science in the new government of President Mikheil Saakashvili and spearheaded a large-scale reform which eradicated corruption from the university enrollment process. In 2007, he became the Secretary of the National Security Council and was one of the key figures of the Russo-Georgian War. In 2011, Mikheil Saakashvili awarded Lomaia St. George's Order of Victory for his exceptional role in the nation-building process and diplomatic success of Georgia.

== Education ==
Lomaia earned a master of science degree at the Georgian Polytechnic Institute in 1985 with a specialty in hydraulic engineering. Lomaia continued his postgraduate studies at the Moscow Civil Engineering Institute, where, in 1992, he successfully defended his doctoral thesis on the topic of "Investigation of the dynamic characteristics of massive power plants" and was awarded Doctor of Philosophy degree in Hydropower Engineering.
