= Tabula (magazine) =

Georgian magazine

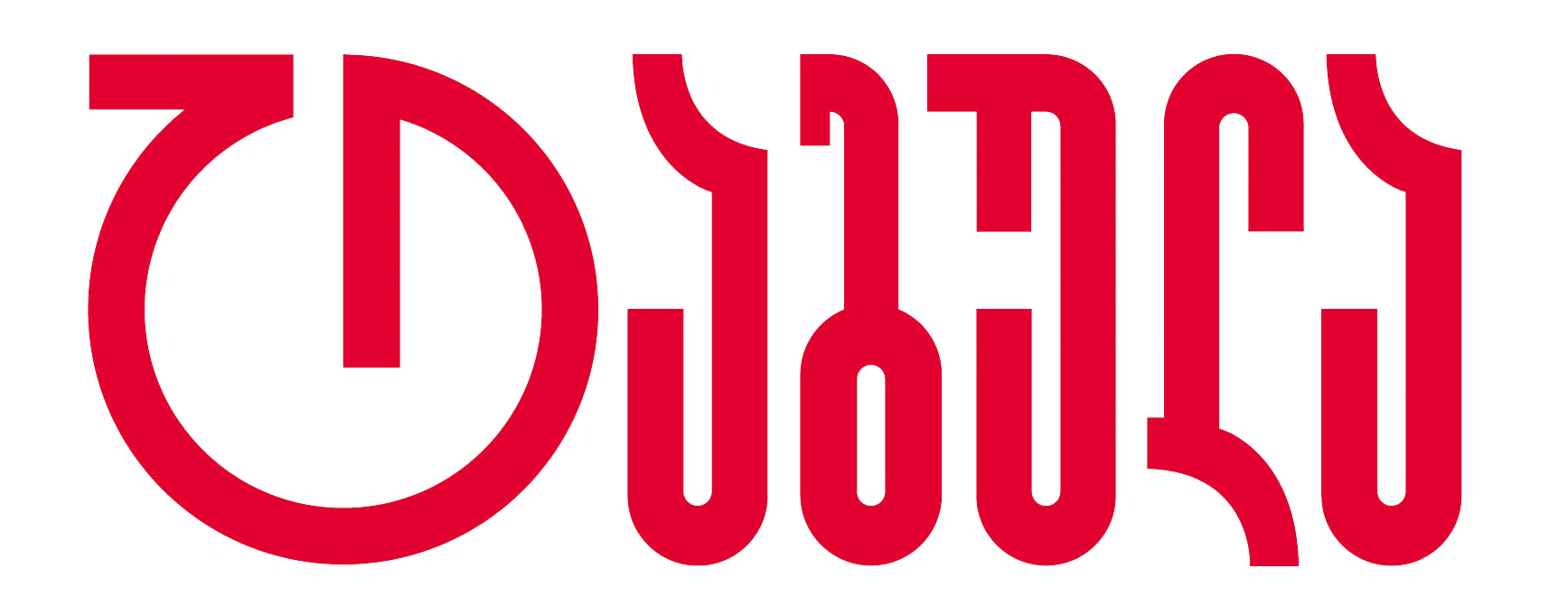
- Editor: Levan Sutidze
- Categories: Politics, Society, Business
- Founder: Tamar Chergoleishvili
- Founded: 2010
- Country: Georgia
- Language: English, Georgian
- Website: http://tabula.ge
- ISSN: 1987-8931

Tabula (Georgian: ტაბულა, romanized: t'abula) is a Georgian online news platform and magazine published by the Civic Education Foundation since 2010, follows a clear editorial policy grounded in a right-libertarian worldview. The editor-in-chief of Tabula as of 2020 is Levan Sutidze.

Tabula covers a number of topics including local politics, business and society issues. The official website provides daily blogs and news updates covering various topics.

== History ==
The Civic Education Foundation, founded in 2010, launched Tabula as one of its key projects. The magazine was published weekly from March 15, 2010, and switched to a monthly format from November 1, 2013, until September 2014. Additionally, an English-language version of Tabula has been published monthly since May 2010, providing analysis of political and societal developments in Georgia to the diplomatic corps and foreign non-governmental organizations in the country. Since May 2010, Tabula has also delivered content through its website.

The founder of Tabula was Tamar Chergoleishvili, the spouse of Giga Bokeria, a prominent political figure who held various high-ranking government positions from 2003 to 2013.

To further expand its presence in the media market, the Civic Education Foundation purchased a television frequency on October 15, 2012, and began broadcasting on January 9, 2013. However, television broadcasting is currently temporarily suspended.
