= Iulon Gagoshidze =

Iulon Gagoshidze (Georgian: იულონ გაგოშიძე) (born 17 July 1935) is a Georgian historian, archaeologist, scholar and politician who served as the State Minister for Diaspora Issues in the Government of Georgia from November 2007 to December 2009, when he was moved to lead the recently created Archeological Research Center at the President's Administration. As a scholar, Gagoshidze is chiefly known for his excavations at Dedoplis Mindori and studies of the Achaemenid relics in Georgia.

== Biography ==
Gagoshidze was born in 1935 in Tbilisi, then-Soviet Georgia. He graduated from the Department of History of Tbilisi State University in 1958 and obtained a Doctorate in Historical Sciences in 1985. Beginning in 1968, Gagoshidze has led various archaeological expeditions to Israel, Cyprus, Azerbaijan, Georgia's Ksani river valley, Samadlo, Dedoplistsqaro and other localities. In 1991 he served as the head of local administration (prefect) of Mtskheta. Later, from 2004 to 2005, he was a member of Tbilisi City Council. From 2007 to 2009, Gagoshidze was a minister for Diaspora Issues in the Mikheil Saakashvili administration. He became a member of the advisory board of the Ancient West and East (Leiden-Boston-Cologne) in 2002.

== Publications ==
Iulon Gagoshidze has published nine monographs

- Antiques from Ksani Valley, Tbilisi, 1964;
- Самадло. Археологические раскопки, Тб.,1979;
- Самадло. Каталог археологического материала, Тб.,1981;
- The Georgian women jewelry, Tbilisi, 1981 (in Georgian, Russian and Spanish languages);
- Trialeti burials, III, Trialeti antique burials, Tb., 1982 (in Georgian and Russian);
- Au pays de la Toison d’or. Art ancien de Géorgie Soviétique, Paris, 1982 (co-author);
- Money in Georgia, Tb., 2000 (in Georgian and English; co-author);
- Iberia and Rome. The Excavations of the Palace at Dedoplis Gora and the Roman Influence in the Caucasian Kingdom of Iberia, Langenweis-sbach: Beier & Beran, 2008 (co-author and co-publisher);
- The Georgian monastery in Cyprus, Tb., 2014 (in Georgian and English, co-author).
