= Anna Zhvania =

Anna Zhvania (Georgian: ანა ჟვანია) (born July 24, 1970) is a Georgian sociologist and former (2006–2012) governmental official who served as head of the foreign intelligence branch of Georgia from 2006 until 2008, being the first female to have been appointed to this post in Georgia.

== Education ==
Born in St. Petersburg, Zhvania graduated from Saint-Petersburg State University of Culture and Arts in 1994. She holds an MA in Modern History of the Central European University in Budapest. She participated in LAD program of Stanford University Center on Democracy, Development and the Rule of Law (CDDRL) in 2017.

== Career ==
Zhvania worked at the Liberty Institute (1998-2001), different Georgian NGOs, at Eurasia Foundation (2001-2005), Open Society Georgia Foundation (2000-2001), Public Defendre’s (Ombudsman) Office.

In 2006, Zhvania served as an advisor to President of Georgia Mikheil Saakashvili on civic integration. She later headed the Georgian Foreign Intelligence Service, from 2006 until 2008. She was replaced by Gela Bezhuashvili.

In the government of President Saakashvili, Zhvania served as First Deputy Minister for Education and Science from 2008 until 2009, under the leadership of ministers Ghia Nodia and Nika Gvaramia. She went on to work as an adviser to the Minister of Defence in the field of policy advising and communication with partners from 2009 until 2013, serving under successive ministers Vasil Sikharulidze, Bacho Akhalaia, Dimitri Shashkini and Irakli Alasania.

Zhvania was the first director at the Richard G. Lugar Center for Public Health Research (CPHR) in Tbilisi (2009-2013). Since 2013, she has been a senior research fellow at the Georgian Institute for Strategic Studies (GISS). She is also a lecturer and head of Social Research Lab at Ilia State University.
