= Davit Sujashvili =

Georgian intelligence official (born 1976)

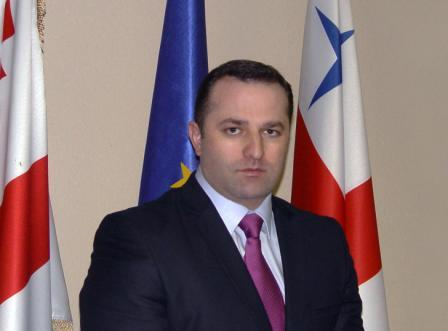
Davit Sujashvili

Davit Sujashvili (Georgian: დავით სუჯაშვილი; born June 15, 1976) is the current Head of the Georgian Intelligence Service since December 2013. Married, has three children. Military rank: Colonel. Awards: 1st Dan Black Belt in Kyokushin karate. Speaks Georgian, English, Russian and Turkish.

== Education ==
In 1999 Davit Sujashvili graduated with honors the Academy of the Ministry of State Security of Georgia.

== Career ==
Sujashvili started his career at the Georgian Foreign Intelligence Service in November 1999. From November 2012 to December 2013 he was the Head of Department of Information and Analysis of the Ministry of Internal Affairs of Georgia. In December 2013 he was appointed to the position of the Head of Georgian Intelligence Service.
