= Kmara =

Georgian civic youth resistance movement

The Kmara logo

Kmara (Georgian: კმარა, lit. 'Enough') was a civic youth resistance movement in Georgia, active in the protests prior to and during the November 2003 Rose Revolution, which toppled down the government of Eduard Shevardnadze. Consciously modeled on the Serbian nongovernmental organization (NGO) Otpor!, which had been instrumental in defeating Slobodan Milošević's regime in 2000, the Kmara members were trained and advised by the influential Georgian NGO Liberty Institute and funded by the United States–based Open Society Institute (OSI). The movement was a hybrid of social movement and virtual NGO, which was highly successful in mobilizing the young Georgians, mostly students, against Shevardnadze's rule. Although Kmara was allied with the opposition parties, especially Mikheil Saakashvili's United National Movement, its behavior and tactics were nonpartisan, focusing on criticizing corruption and failures of the Shevardnadze regime, rather than promoting any particular politician or political party.

== Origin ==
The Kmara movement emerged in April 2003. It was formed by the Georgian student activists which received training by the Serbian Otpor! through the funding of the OSI. The training was focused on sharing the Serbian experience of nonviolent action and Kmara's logo was a near-exact copy of the Otpor's clenched fist.

== Tactics ==
Kmara organized a loose, decentralized network of the regional cells and employed simple, but effective methods to create a large-scale social movement against the government of Eduard Shevardnadze. Members spray-painted the word "kmara" ("Enough!") on walls, buildings, streets, and elsewhere in even most remote places in Georgia. The slogan was quickly upheld by those who saw the Shevardnadze regime increasingly corrupt and failing. This effort was supplemented by noisy protest marches and aggressive media campaign. According to one of the co-founders of Kmara, Giorgi Kandelaki, "Kmara succeeded in breaking through the public’s political apathy, particularly among young people."

== Activity ==
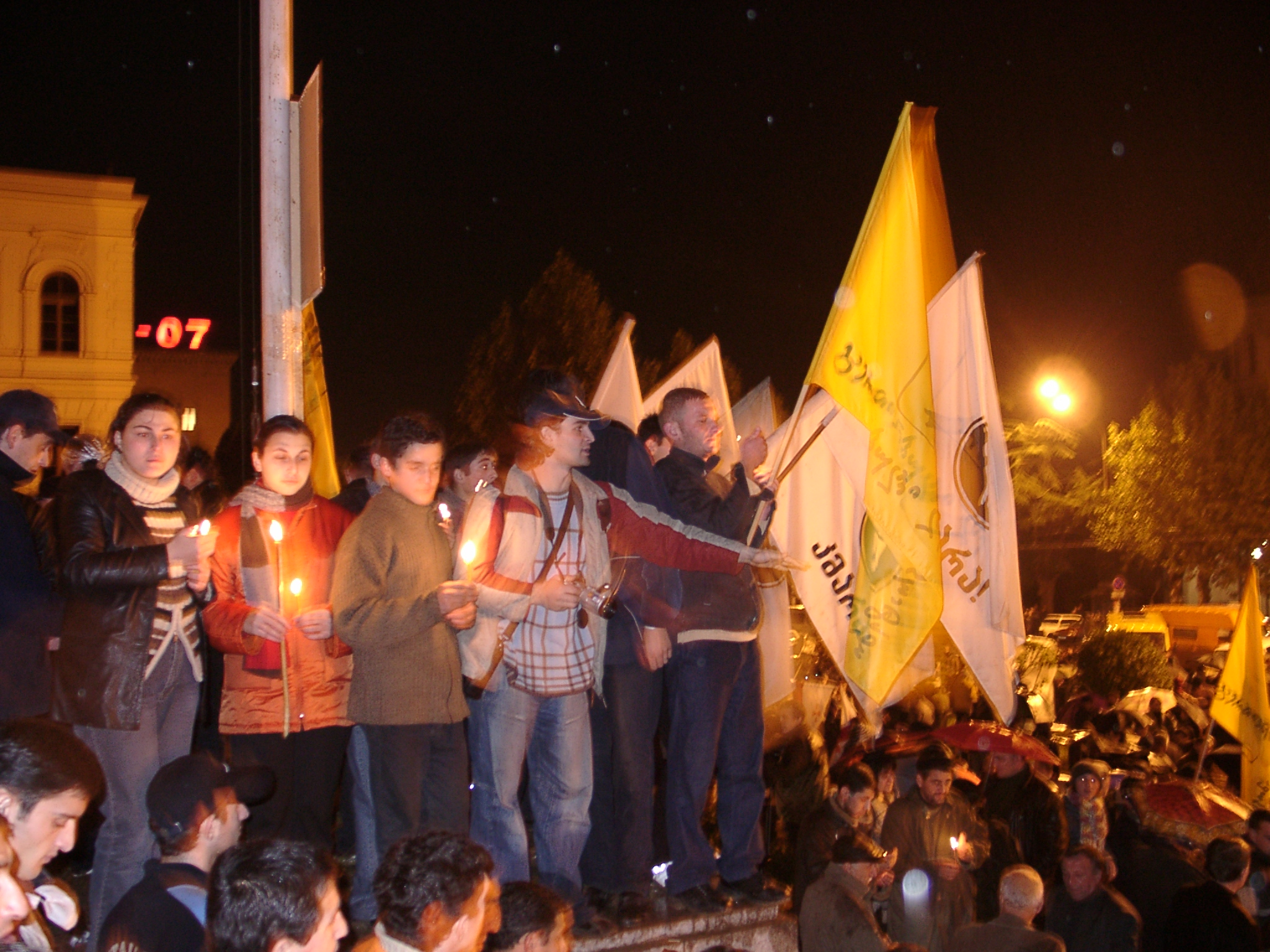
Young Georgians holding the Kmara flags during the Rose Revolution in November 2003

The scale of Kmara's actions grew as the November 2003 parliamentary election was approaching and many Georgians feared the government was ready to resort to election fraud. On April 14, 2003, Kmara made its first major appearance, staging a march of some 200 students from the Tbilisi State University to the State Chancellery, chanting their slogan "kmara" and demanding resignation of the "corrupt government" and President Shevardnadze. Since then, Kmara conducted several anti-government actions, drawing criticism from Shevardnadze's allies, who, initially suggested that the movement was financed by the "Russian special services". On August 6, 2003, police force was used to disperse the Kmara rally, protesting against the arrival of the Russian state-owned power company Unified Energy Systems (UES) to the Georgian energy market.

Kmara remained at the forefront of the mass rallies following the November 2003 parliamentary election, which was criticized by the opposition, NGOs and international observers. After the demonstrations brought about the resignation of Shevradnadze, Kmara shifted its focus in Adjara, a southwestern autonomous republic ran by Aslan Abashidze. The movement was continuously harassed by the Adjarian regime, which, in its turn, fell to the increasing pressure from the new Georgian government of Mikheil Saakashvili.

In 2005, Kmara worked with their counterparts in Belarus, named Zubr. In August 2005, two activists of the Georgian youth movement Kmara, Giorgi Kandelaki and Luka Tsuladze, were arrested in Minsk and held in prison for 15 days on charges of "hooliganism". The human rights NGO Amnesty International condemned the arrest and said that it "considers Luka Tsuladze and Giorgi Kandelaki to be prisoners of conscience."
