= Gantiadi (magazine) =

Gantiadi Georgian: განთიადი
- Editor-in-Chief: Avtandil Kurashvili
- Deputy Editor-in-Chief: Temur Amkoladze
- Categories: Literary
- Publisher: Georgian Writers' Union, Kutaisi Branch
- Founder: Guram Panjikidze
- First issue: January 1975; 51 years ago
- Country: Georgia
- Based in: Kutaisi, Imereti region
- Language: Georgian
- Website: gantiadial.simplesite.com

Gantiadi (Georgian: განთიადი, Russian: рассвет, The Dawn) is a monthly literary magazine published in Georgia. It was founded in 1975 at a time when the Soviet Union was trying to promote Russian and discourage use of other languages, so at first disguised itself as an "almanac". In 2019 the government recognized it as an intangible cultural heritage monument.

== History ==
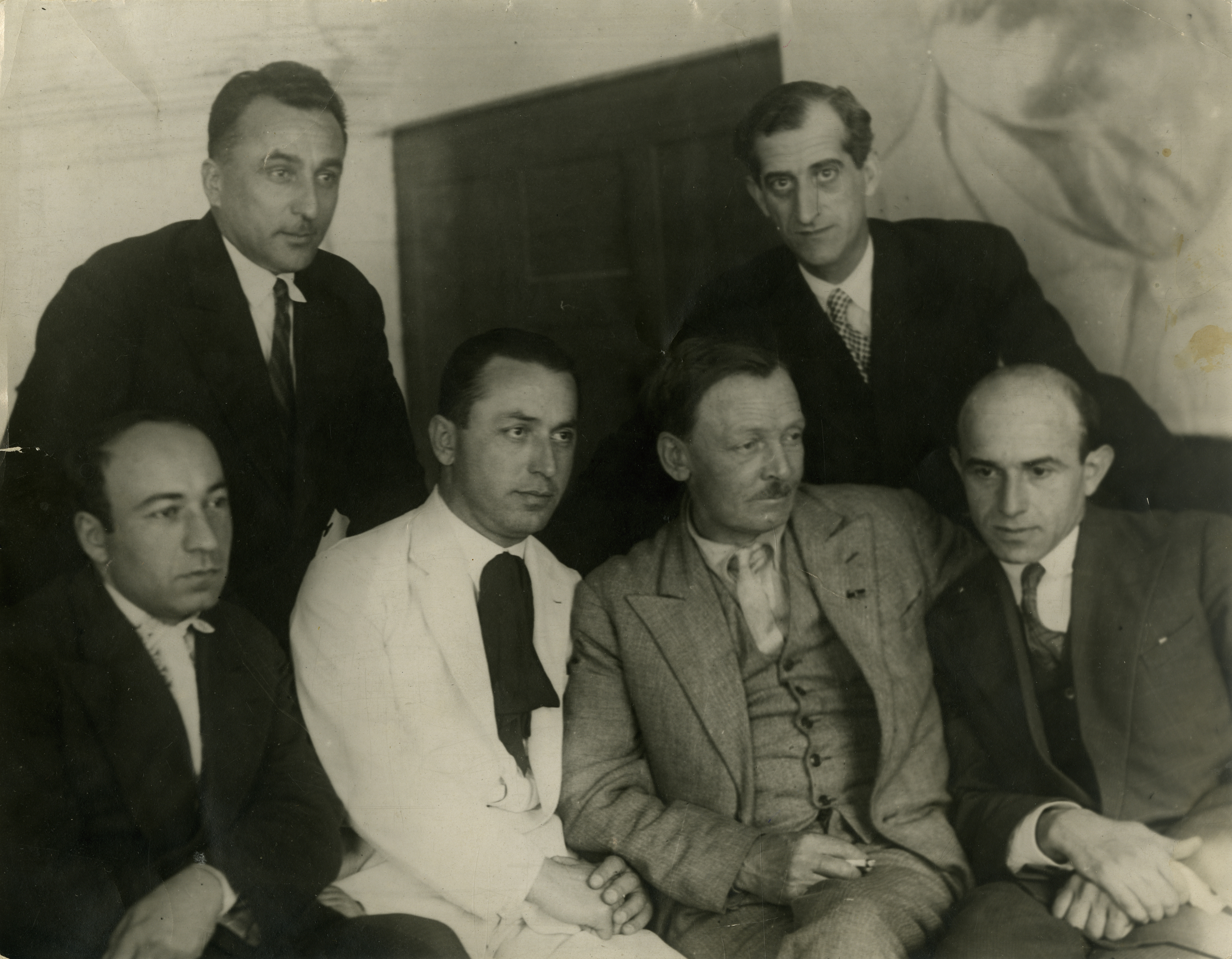
Georgian writers in 1935. Sitting: Benito Buachidze, Razhden Gvetadze, unknown, Konstantine Lortkipanidze (future editor of Gantiadi), Standing: Ilo Mosashvili, Alexander Kutateli

Gantiadi may be seen as a revival of the magazine of the same name published in Tsarist Georgia, founded by students of the Kutaisi Gymnasium in 1887, with the aim of supporting national liberation ideas. The government suppressed it in its second year, but it was revived in 1904. Revived again, Gantiadi was published from 1913 to 1915.

Based in the city of Kutaisi, the present Gantiadi was established in 1975. (Note: Another source gives 1972 as the year of establishment, though this looks in context likely to be a typo.) At this time the Soviet Union was trying to make Russian the only official language. A newspaper, magazine, or even a single printed page could only be published with the approval of the Bureau of the Central Committee of the Communist Party of the Soviet Union. Gantiadi was initially published in the form of almanac to divert the attention of the censors.

Gantiadi's editor-in-chief in the mid-1970s was the writer and journalist Guram Panjikidze (1933–1997). The circulation was 30,000 in 1976. It soon became firmly established in the Imereti region to preserve and strengthen the pure Georgian language. At its peak it had a circulation of 35,000.

The editor-in-chief from 1977 was the poet, journalist and writer Konstantine Lortkipanidze (1905–1986). He was succeeded by the novelist and playwright Rezo Cheishvili (1933–2015). Cheishvili was appointed editor-in chief of the magazine in January 1987. Under Cheishvili the almanac, with the permission of the Kremlin, was converted to a magazine and was published regularly, with solid content and a large circulation, before the outbreak of the revolutionary upheavals of 1988 and 1991–1993.

== Contents ==
The literary almanac is published by the Georgian Writers' Union, Kutaisi Branch. It is published in Kutaisi once every two months. It includes works of Georgian writers, publicist and critical letters, reviews, translations and more. In 2015 the National Agency for Cultural Heritage Preservation of Georgia listed the journal as an intangible cultural heritage monument for its "continuous tradition of Georgian periodical publication". This designation was made official by Decree No 143 of the Government of Georgia, Tbilisi, dated 25 March 2019. The magazine was one of 45 to receive this designation, most of the others being traditional forms of expression, cuisine and technology. The literary children's magazine Dila was the only other publication.

== Sources ==
- Alexander Mikaberidze (2015). "Literature". Historical Dictionary of Georgia. Rowman & Littlefield. p. 445. ISBN 9781442241466.
- Chachanidze, Irine; Tsuleiskiri, Nato; Guchua, Tamar (2019), The Discussion on the Status of the Russian Language in Georgian Schools (PDF), Akaki Tsereteli State University, Georgia, doi:10.22333/ijme.2019.14005, ISSN 1512-3146, S2CID 239773466, archived from the original on July 11, 2020
- Decree No 143 25 March 2019 of the Government of Georgia, Tbilisi (PDF) – via UNESCO
- Rayfield, Donald (2001). "Georgia". In Jones, Derek (ed.). Censorship: a World Encyclopedia. Routledge. p. 914. ISBN 9781136798641.
- Georgian Soviet Encyclopedia (ქართული საბჭოთა ენციკლოპედია) (PDF) (in Georgian), vol. 2, Tbilisi, 1977, p. 681
- Kurashvili, Avtandil, "განთიადი ლიტერატურული ჟურნალი სრული ორმოცი წელიწადი! (Gantiadi Literary Magazine for a full forty years!)", Gantiadi (in Georgian)
- Mchedlishvili, David A. (2010–2012), "კონსტანტინე ლორთქიფანიძე (Konstantine Lortkipanidze)", Biographical Dictionary of Georgia (in Georgian)
- "Panjikidze Guram". Georgian National Book Center.
- "Rezo Cheishvili died (გარდაიცვალა რეზო ჭეიშვილი)", PSnews.ge (in Georgian), 9 November 2015
- "Rezo Cheishvili passed away". Writer's House of Georgia. 11 September 2015. Archived from the original on 15 September 2021.
- "UNESCO Culture for Development Indicators: Georgie's Analytical and Technical Report" (PDF). 2017. p. 86.
