= Ivanishvili government =

Government of Georgia

- 10th Cabinet of Georgia
- 2012-2013
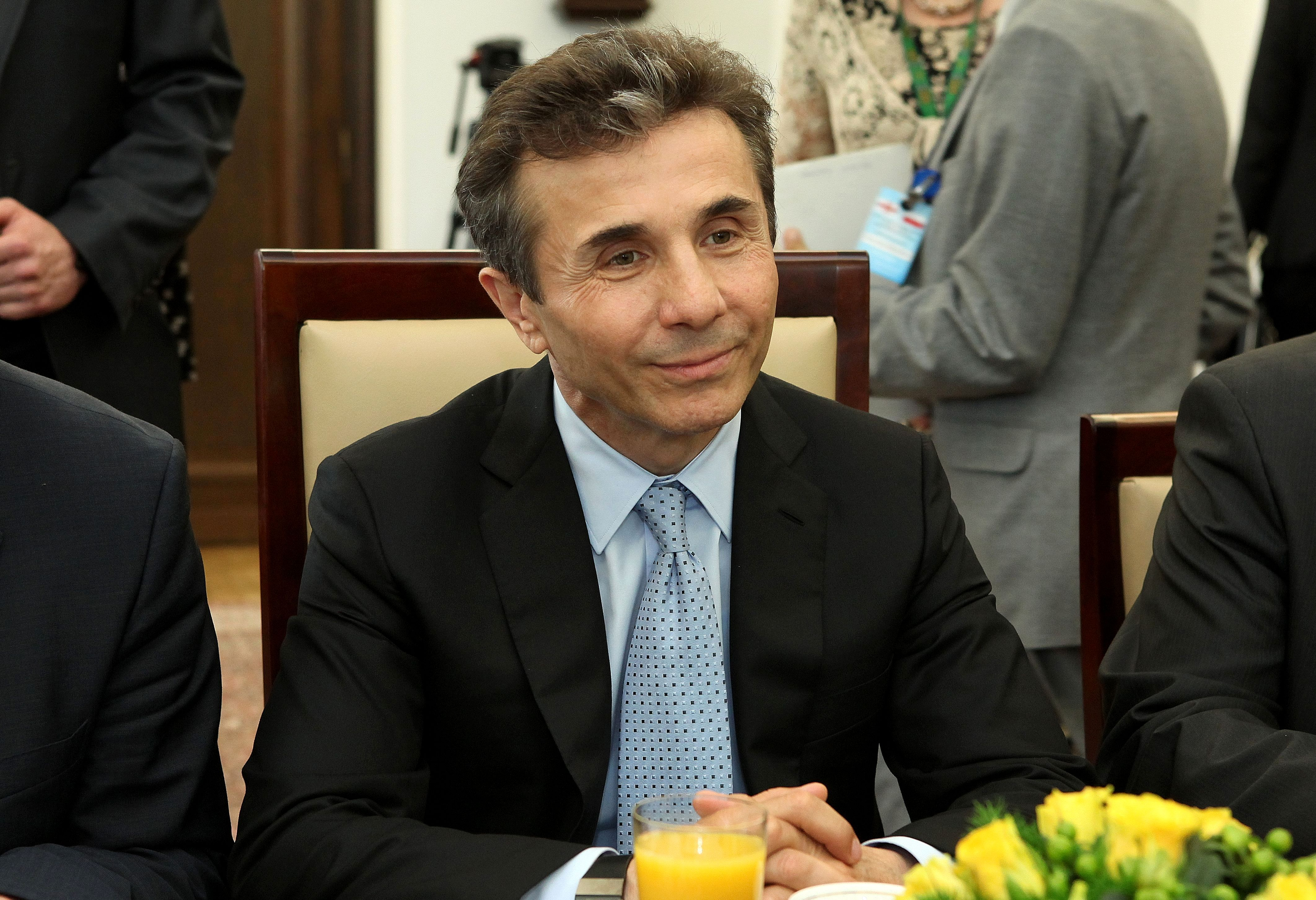
- Date formed: October 25, 2012
- Date dissolved: November 20, 2013

People and organisations
- Head of state: Mikheil Saakashvili (UNM); Giorgi Margvelashvili (GD)
- Head of government: Bidzina Ivanishvili (GD)
- No. of ministers: 21
- Member parties: Georgian Dream Coalition
- Status in legislature: Majority government

History
- Election: 2012 parliamentary election
- Legislature term: 8th Parliament of Georgia (2012–2016)
- Predecessor: Merabishvili government
- Successor: First Garibashvili government

The government of Bidzina Ivanishvili was the government of Georgia, led by Bidzina Ivanishvili as the Prime Minister. It was formed by the members of the Bidzina Ivanishvili–Georgian Dream coalition after the victory in the October 1, 2012 parliamentary election. The cabinet was confirmed by the Parliament of Georgia on October 25, 2012. It was succeeded, on November 20, 2013, by the government of Irakli Garibashvili, whom Ivanishvili named as his successor on his voluntary resignation from the government.

== List of ministers and portfolios ==
Portfolio	Minister	Period	Party
Prime Minister	Bidzina Ivanishvili	October 25, 2012 – November 20, 2013	Georgian Dream
First Deputy Prime Minister	Irakli Alasania; Giorgi Margvelashvili; Giorgi Kvirikashvili	October 25, 2012 – January 23, 2013; January 23, 2013 – July 18, 2013; July 26, 2013 –	Free Democrats; Georgian Dream; Georgian Dream
Deputy Prime Minister	Kakha Kaladze	October 25, 2012 –	Georgian Dream
Minister of Finance	Nodar Khaduri	October 25, 2012 –	Georgian Dream
Minister of Economy and Sustainable Development	Giorgi Kvirikashvili	October 25, 2012 –	Georgian Dream
Minister for Labor, Healthcare and Social Affairs	David Sergeenko	October 25, 2012 –	Independent
Minister of Energy	Kakha Kaladze	October 25, 2012 –	Georgian Dream
Minister of Internal Affairs	Irakli Gharibashvili	October 25, 2012 – November 20, 2013	Georgian Dream
Minister of Justice	Thea Tsulukiani	October 25, 2012 –	Our Georgia – Free Democrats
Minister of Foreign Affairs	Maia Panjikidze	October 25, 2012 –	Georgian Dream
Minister of Education and Science	Giorgi Margvelashvili; Tamar Sanikidze	October 25, 2012 – July 18, 2013; July 18, 2013 –	Georgian Dream; Independent
Minister for IDPs, Accommodation and Refugees	David Darakhvelidze	October 25, 2012 –	National Forum
Minister of Environment Protection and Natural Resources	Khatuna Gogoladze	October 25, 2012 –	Independent
Minister of Defense	Irakli Alasania	October 25, 2012 –	Our Georgia – Free Democrats
Minister of Regional Development and Infrastructure	David Narmania	October 25, 2012 –	Republican Party of Georgia
Minister of Agriculture	David Kirvalidze; Shalva Pipia	October 25, 2012 – May 2, 2013; May 10, 2013 –	Independent; Independent
Minister of Corrections and Legal Assistance	Sozar Subari	October 25, 2012 –	Georgian Dream
Minister of Culture and Monument Protection	Guram Odisharia	October 25, 2012 –	Georgian Dream
Minister of Sport and Youth Affairs	Levan Kipiani	October 25, 2012 –	Georgian Dream
State Minister for European and Euro-Atlantic Integration	Alexi Petriashvili	October 25, 2012 -	Our Georgia – Free Democrats
State Minister for Reintegration	Paata Zakareishvili	October 25, 2012 –	Republican Party of Georgia
State Minister on the Diaspora Issues	Kote Surguladze	October 25, 2012 –	Our Georgia – Free Democrats
State Minister for Employment	Kakha Sakandelidze	October 25, 2012 – January 11, 2013 (the office abolished on that date)	Independent

== See also ==
- Government of Georgia
- Cabinet of Zurab Zhvania
