= Konstantine Lortkipanidze =

Soviet and Georgian writer

- კონსტანტინე ლორთქიფანიძე
- Born: 7 January 1905; Didi Jikhaishi village, Kutais Governorate, Russian Empire
- Died: 30 July 1986 (aged 81); Tbilisi, Georgian SSR, Soviet Union
- Occupation: Writer

Konstantine Lortkipanidze (Georgian: კონსტანტინე ლორთქიფანიძე, Russian: Константин Лордкипанидзе; 7 January 1905 – 30 July 1986) was a Soviet and Georgian writer.

== Life ==
=== Early years ===
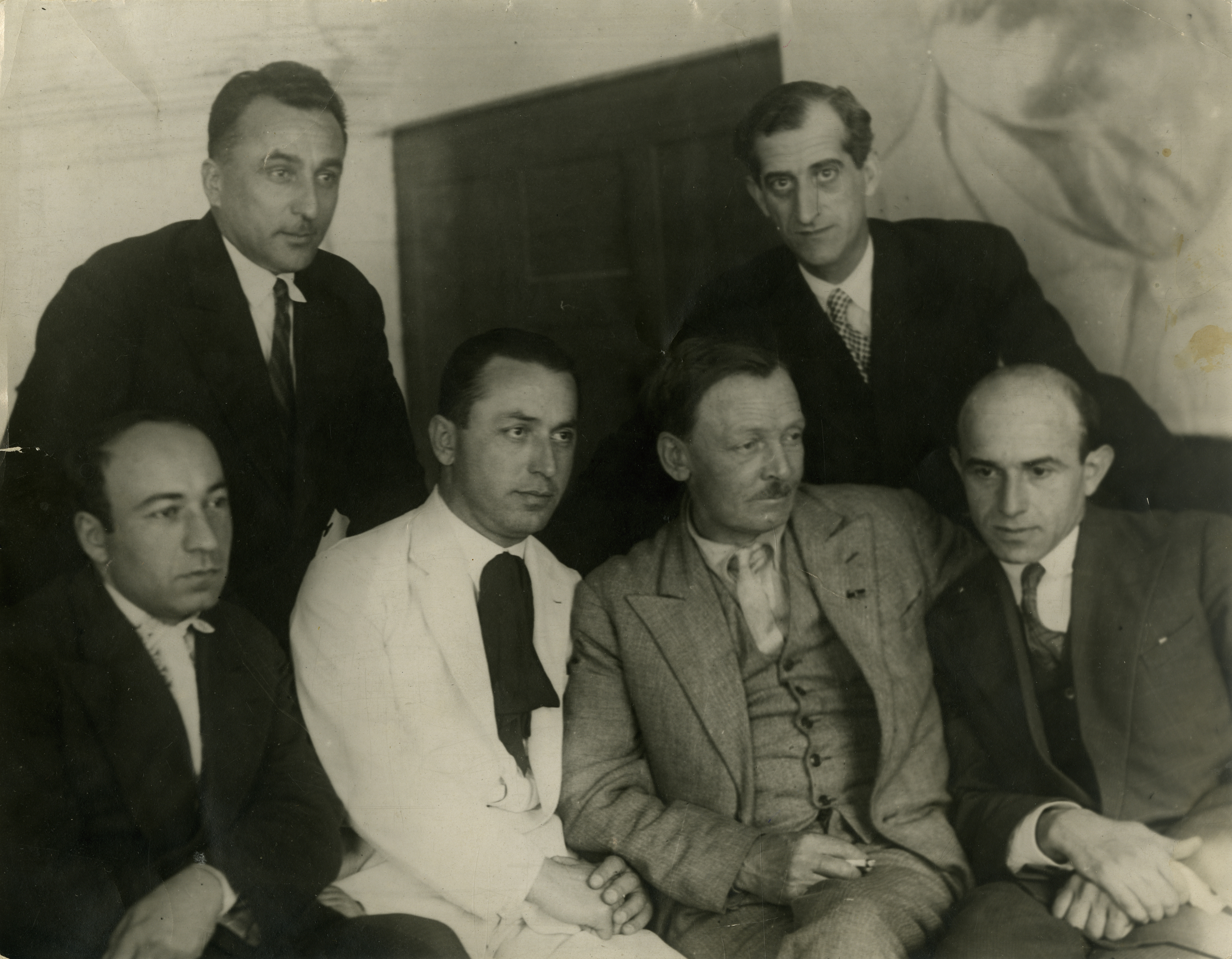
Georgian writers in 1935. Sitting: Benito Buachidze, Razhden Gvetadze, unknown, Konstantin Lortkipanidze, Standing: Ilo Mosashvili, Alexander Kutateli

Konstantine Lortkipanidze was born on 7 January 1905 in the village of Didi Jikhaishi. He attended Kutaisi Humanitarian Technical School, and graduated in 1924. That year he published his first poem. In 1926 he published his first collection of poetry. At first he was strongly influenced by the Georgian Symbolists, but soon left them and declared himself a proletarian poet. He wrote many pompous poems about the revolutionary struggle. Lortkipanidze was an active participant and agitator in the 1937 purges that led to the deaths of many of his writer colleagues, as a detailed historical study has shown.

From the early 1930s he began to write only in prose. Themes in his prose works were new social relations, breaking away from old ideas, the heroism of the Soviet people and active humanism. His novel The Dawn of Kolkhida (1931, reprinted 1952) described the great changes in the life of a Georgian village. The collection of stories Immortality (1938) tells of the struggles of the Belarusians during the civil war of 1918–1920.

=== World War II ===
During World War II (1939–1945) in 1942 the Central Committee of the Communist Party of Georgia sent Lortkipanidze and other activists to strengthen the Georgian 414th Rifle Division of the Red Army. He joined the active army in September 1943, first as a telephone operator in a communications company and then from 1944 as correspondent and organizer of the Georgian-language divisional newspaper Forward for the Motherland. He fought in the North Caucasian Front and in the separate Primorsky Army, and participated in the Novorossiysk-Taman and Crimean offensive operations. He was awarded two military orders for his exemplary performance in combat. He was demobilized in 1945.

=== Post-war ===
The heroism of the people during the war was an important theme of several of Lortkipanidze's later works such as A Blade Without Rust (1949), Death Will Wait (1968, stories), How the Old Fishermen Died and others. His award-winning collection of true stories Death Will Wait (1968) was dedicated to the heroism of the Soviet people during World War II. The novel The Magic Stone (1955 part 1, 1965 part 2) is a broad canvas about Soviet Georgia. Contemporary ethical problems are at the center of the short stories Ortachal Fishermen (1969), Long Live Don Quixote (1970) and others.

His works were translated into French, German, Turkic, Ukrainian and Armenian. He translated his own works into Russian. He translated the works of Taras Shevchenko and Vladimir Mayakovsky into Georgian. He also translated works by A. Mitskevich, P. Eluaris, I. Franco, Kh. Aboviani, A. Isaakian, poetic works of Takuboku and several chapters of the Armenian epic Daredevils of Sassoun. Lordkipanidze wrote scripts for the films Friendship (1941), Shadow on the Road (1957), Interrupted Song (1960).

Lordnipanidze was editor-in-chief to the Literaturnaya Gruziya magazine (1956–1962) and Tsikari magazine (1962–1966). He was director of the Nakaduli publishing house in 1966–1973. He was editor of the Zarya almanac in 1973–1986. In 1977 he was appointed editor-in-chief of the almanac Gantiadi. He was a deputy to the eighth convocation of the Supreme Soviet of the Georgian SSR. Lortkipanidze died on 30 July 1986, and is buried in the Didube Pantheon in Tbilisi.

== Awards ==
- Hero of Socialist Labour (1985)
- Two Orders of Lenin (1975, 1985)
- Three Orders of the Red Banner of Labour (1939, 1955, 1965)
- Two Orders of the Red Star (1943, 1944)
- Order of the Badge of Honour (1971)
- Shota Rustaveli Prize (1971)

== Publications ==
- Konstantine Lortkipanidze (1927), Xavsi (in Georgian), Tbilisi
- Konstantine Lortkipanidze (1929), Birveli deda (in Georgian), Tbilisi
- Konstantine Lortkipanidze (1930), Axali glexebi: Narkvevi (in Georgian), Tbilisi
- Konstantine Lortkipanidze (1955–1956), Rch'eshli Nacerebi (in Georgian), vol. 1–2, Tbilisi
- Konstantine Lortkipanidze (1958), Natvris t'vali (in Georgian), Tbilisi
- Konstantine Lortkipanidze (1959), The Dawn of Kolkhida (novel) (in Georgian), Tbilisi: Tsodna, p. 303
- Konstantine Lortkipanidze (1966), Death Will Wait : True Stories (in Georgian), Tbilisi: Council. Georgia, p. 95
- Konstantine Lortkipanidze (1967), One-volume (in Georgian), Tbilisi: Literature and Art, p. 542
- Konstantine Lortkipanidze (1969), Tsabunia : Story. For school-age children (in Georgian), Tbilisi: Nakaduli, p. 25
- Konstantine Lortkipanidze (1975), How the Old Fisherman Died : Story (in Georgian), Tbilisi: Merani, p. 131

== Sources ==
- "Лордкипанидзе Константин Александрович", warheroes.ru (in Russian)
- "Konstantin Lordkipanidze", The Great Soviet Encyclopedia, 1979
- "Константин Лордкипанидзе", peoples.ru (in Russian)
- Mchedlishvili, David A. (2010–2012), "კონსტანტინე ლორთქიფანიძე (Konstantine Lortkipanidze)", Biographical Dictionary (in Georgian)
