= Aleksandre Jejelava =

Georgian politician (born 1973)

Aleksandre Jejelava ალექსანდრე ჯეჯელავა

Minister of Education and Science of Georgia
- In office 3 June 2016 – 13 November 2017
- President: Giorgi Margvelashvili
- Prime Minister: Giorgi Kvirikashvili
- Preceded by: Tamar Sanikidze
- Succeeded by: Mikheil Chkhenkeli

Deputy Prime Minister of Georgia
- In office 21 February 2017 – 13 November 2017
- President: Giorgi Margvelashvili
- Prime Minister: Giorgi Kvirikashvili
- Succeeded by: Giorgi Gakharia

Personal details
- Born: 24 May 1973 (age 53) Tbilisi, Georgian SSR, Soviet Union (Now Georgia)
- Party: Georgian Dream (2016-June 2018); Independent (until 2016)
- Education: Tbilisi State University

Military service
- Allegiance: Georgia

Aleksandre Jejelava (Georgian: ალექსანდრე ჯეჯელავა; (born May 24, 1973) — was the Minister of Education and Science of Georgia from June 2016 to June 2018.

== Early life and education ==
Aleksandre Jejelava was born in Tbilisi. In 1995, he graduated from Tbilisi State University, with a degree in Applied Mathematics and Computer Sciences. In 2003-2005, he obtained a master's degree in General Management at ESM Business School – in Tbilisi. In 2009-2010, he studied at George Washington University, where he acquired a master's degree in Project Management. Since 2015, he is a certified international coach.

== Career ==
Since June 3, 2016, Aleksandre Jejelava holds a position as the Minister of Education and Science of Georgia. In 2010-2016, he held a position as a Chairman and a head coach at Management Academy. At the same time, he was a professor at the Bank of Georgia University and Caucasus School of Business. He was a professor at Tbilisi Free University, Caucasus University and a dean for the master's degree program at Georgian Institute of Public Affairs.

Aleksandre Jejelava also held a variety of positions at Open Society Georgia Foundation, the National Bank of Georgia, TBC Bank and the Intellect Bank. He was a speaker for the TEDx Tbilisi; and held a position as a Chairman of the board at V. Komarov Physics and Mathematics Public School N199. Furthermore, Aleksandre Jejelava was in charge of the IT strategic development at the Georgian Lottery Company.

== Family ==
He is married and has three daughters and one son.
