= Nika Rurua =

Georgian politician

- ნიკოლოზ რურუა
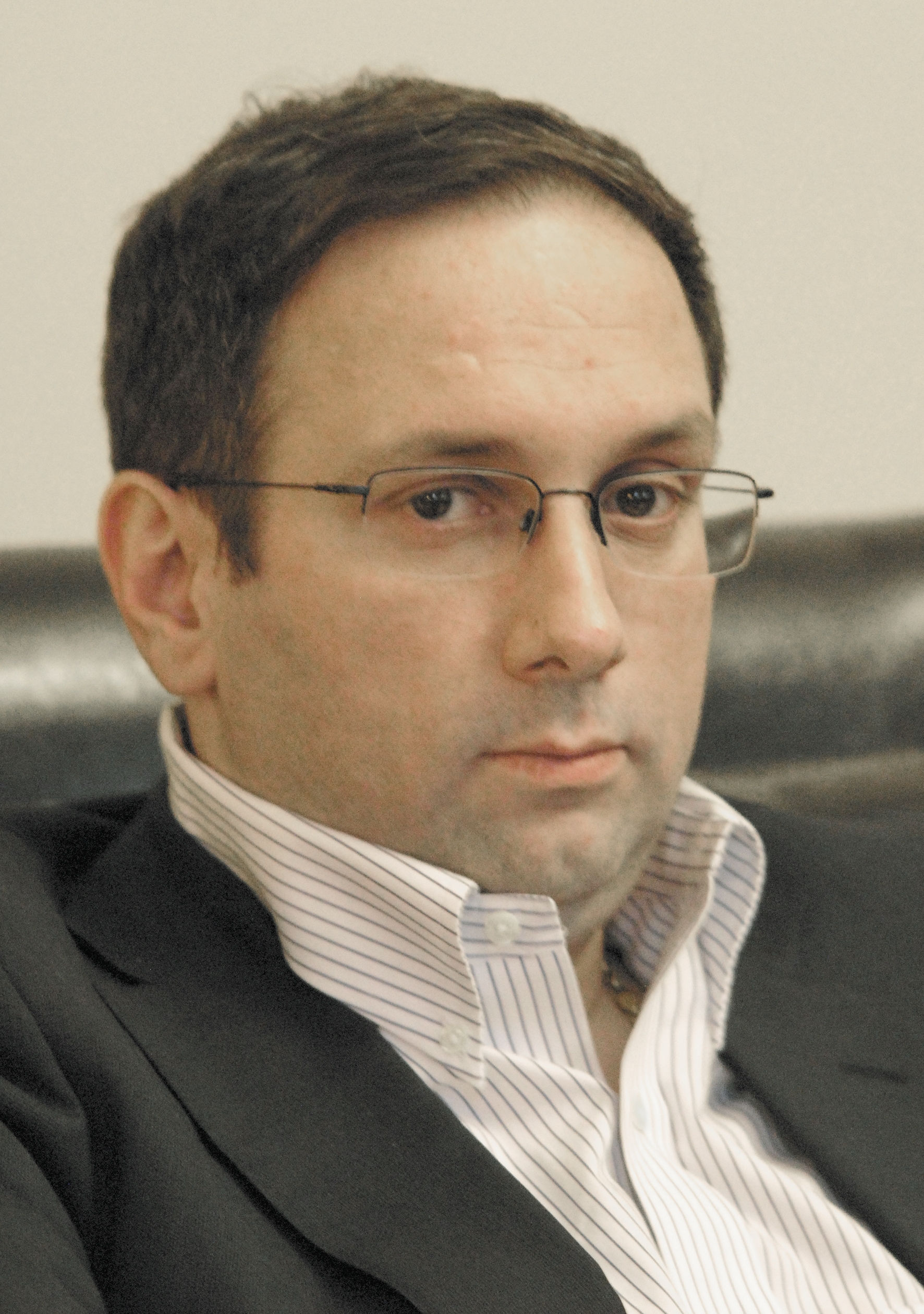

Minister of Culture and Monument Protection of Georgia
- In office 10 December 2008 – 25 October 2012
- President: Mikheil Saakashvili
- Preceded by: Grigol Vashadze
- Succeeded by: Guram Odisharia

Member of the Parliament of Georgia
- In office 22 April 2004 – 16 December 2008

Personal details
- Born: Nikoloz Rurua; 17 March 1968 Tbilisi, Georgian SSR, Soviet Union
- Died: 4 December 2018 (aged 50) Tbilisi, Georgia
- Party: United National Movement
- Education: Shota Rustaveli State University; Georgia State University College of Law (J.D.)

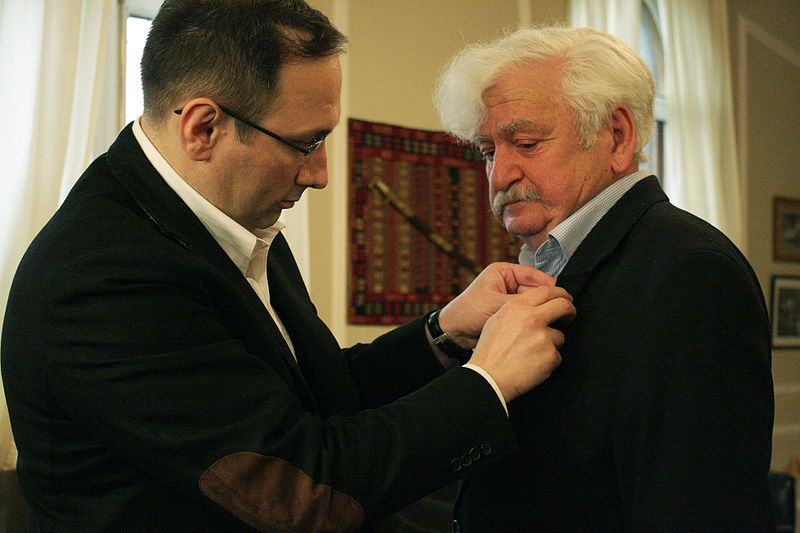
Minister Nikoloz Rurua and the writer Rezo Cheishvili

Nikoloz "Nika" Rurua (Georgian: ნიკოლოზ (ნიკა) რურუა; 17 March 1968 – 4 December 2018) was a Georgian politician, and a member of the Cabinet of Georgia in the capacity of Minister of Culture and Monument Protection of Georgia, from 10 October 2008 until 25 October 2012. Rurua previously served as the Deputy Chairman of the Committee for Defence and Security of the Parliament of Georgia.

== Early life ==
Born in Tbilisi into an artist's family, Rurua studied at the Meliton Balanchivadze Musical College, after which he proceeded to study television directing at the Shota Rustaveli State University of Theater and Cinema in Tbilisi.

Rurua graduated from that institute in 1993 and joined the controversial paramilitary organization Mkhedrioni, which was disbanded in 1994. Under its ranks, Rurua fought the separatist forces in Abkhazia in 1993. In 1994 Rurua continued his studies in the United States.

In 1998 became a student at Georgia State University College of Law in Atlanta, Georgia. He graduated from Georgia State University in 2001 and received the degree of Juris Doctor (J.D).

== Early career ==
Upon his return to Georgia, he began to work for GEPLAC (Georgian-European Policy and Legal Advice Centre), where he headed the project on harmonizing Georgian commercial legislation with that of European Union, and founded the daily-newspaper 24 Hours (24 Saati), where he took up a job of legal observer and editor of the newspaper’s weekly addition The Law. In 2003 Rurua published The Law of Freedom, a collection of essays and articles.

== Political career ==
Following the Rose Revolution of 2003, Rurua became a member of the Parliament of Georgia from the United National Movement party.

During his term in the Parliament he held the post of deputy chairman of the Defence and Security Committee and was a member of the Legal Committee. He also headed the Georgian Parliamentary delegation to the NATO Parliamentary Assembly.

In his capacity of deputy head of Defence and Security Committee Rurua was the initiator of counter-intelligence legislation. Rurua proposed and drafted legislation against organized crime. Both initiatives proved to be effective in combating the organized crime, its influence on the social and economic life of the country, as well as in limiting activities of hostile intelligence services on Georgia.

In 2005 Rurua established the Museum of Soviet Occupation. The same year he led a group of parliamentarians in bringing the remains of the anti-Soviet military leader Kaikhosro (Kakutsa) Cholokashvili back to Georgia.

From 2008 to 2012, Rurua was the Minister of Culture and Monument Protection of Georgia. He was one of the founders of the Black Sea Jazz Festival in the seaside city of Batumi and was instrumental in Georgia's participation in 2018 Frankfurt Book Fair as the official Guest of Honour.

== Death ==
Rurua was found dead of a suspected heart attack in his Tbilisi apartment on 4 December 2018, aged 50. After Rurua's death, President Giorgi Margvelashvili said: "Nika Rurua had been a very interesting person at all stages of his life. He was my friend and a very strong person."
