= Gvetadze =

Gvetadze is a surname. Notable people with the surname include:

- Nino Gvetadze, Georgian pianist
- Razhden Gvetadze (1897–1952), Georgian Soviet writer and translator
- Sopio Gvetadze (born 1983), Georgian chess grandmaster
