= Gogoladze =

Gogoladze (Georgian: გოგოლაძე) is a Georgian surname that may refer to:

- Leri Gogoladze (born 1938), Georgian water polo player
- Kakha Gogoladze (born 1968), Georgian and Turkmen footballer
- Chatuna Gogaladze (born 1970), Georgian politician
- Koba Gogoladze (born 1972), Georgian boxer
- Ucha Gogoladze (born 1990), Georgian footballer
- Vladimir Gogoladze (born 1968), Georgian gymnast
