= Guram Sherozia =

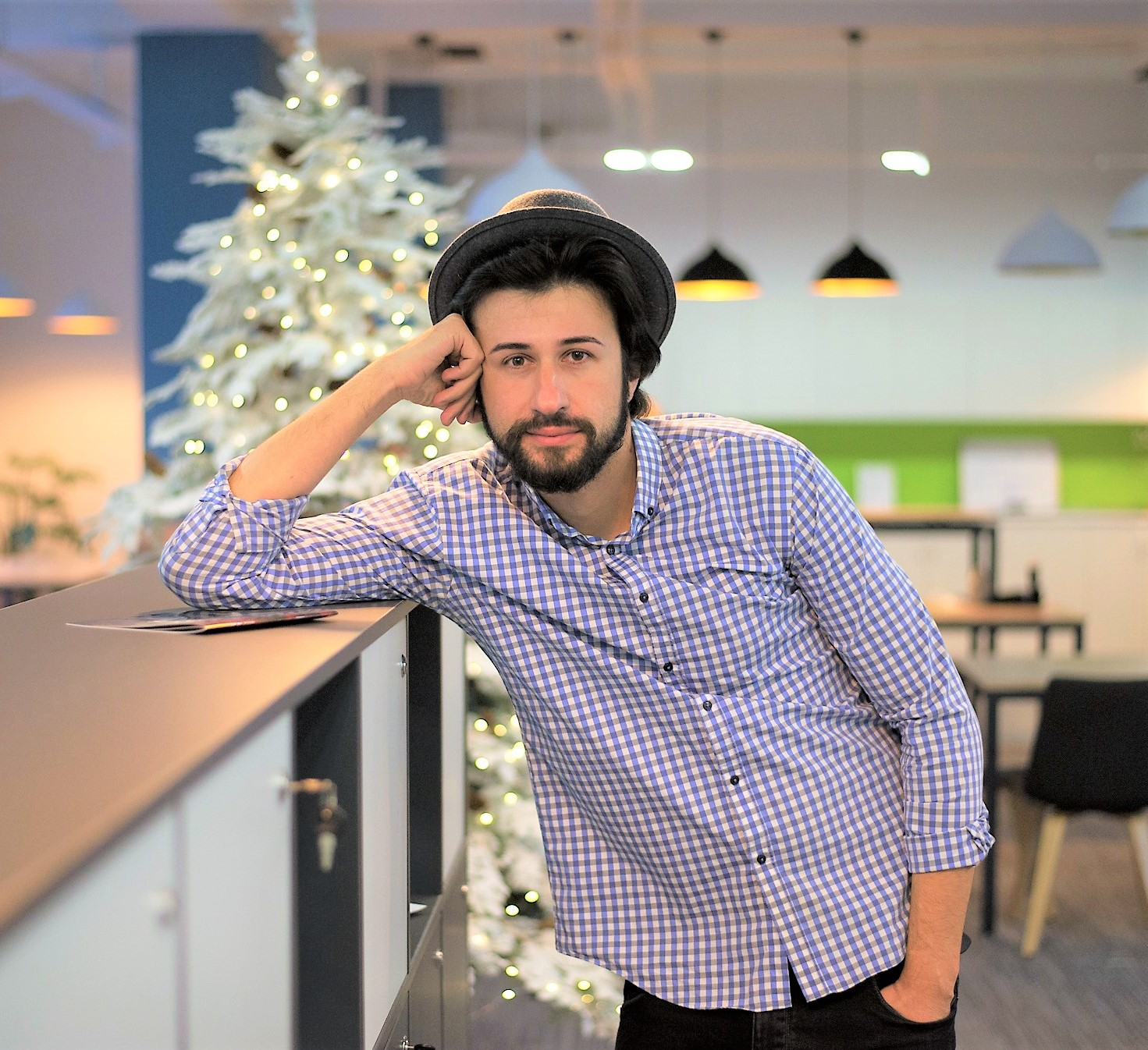
- Born: გურამ შეროზია November 29, 1989 (age 36); Poti, Georgia
- Occupations: TV presenter, Blogger, traveler, marketer, lecturer

Guram Sherozia (Georgian: გურამ შეროზია; born 29 November 1989) is a Georgian TV presenter, Blogger, traveler, marketer, and lecturer.

Sherozia was born in Poti, Samegrelo, Georgia. He graduated from Tbilisi State University, earned a master's degree at the Georgian Institute of Public Affairs, thereafter continued his studies and research in a PhD program at Ilia State University.

He started his academic career in 2011 at Ilia State University while working in his first managerial position at TBC Bank JSC.

Later in 2013, he launched his blog and became a TV presenter for the business program on Palitra TV. Later, he became the TV presenter for one of the most popular shows in Georgia, Imedi's morning program. By 2017, he already had his own TV program on Georgian Public Broadcaster.
