= Educare Georgia =

Non-profit organization in Georgia

- Legal status: non-profit
- Purpose: Providing education in Georgia
- Website: www.educaregeorgia.org

Educare Georgia is a nonprofit educational organization in Georgia.

Educare Georgia has been localizing Khan Academy into the Georgian language since 2015 and has localised school subjects like mathematics, physics, chemistry, biology, and programming. The organization is working on organizing training sessions and presentations in rural schools of Georgia on the implementation of Khan Academy in the classroom. The nonprofit has also partially localized Code.org — a platform for learning computer science — into Georgian. By partnering with Microsoft and the Ministry of Education and Science of Georgia, Educare Georgia also organized the first coding clubs in Georgia.

Educare Georgia has also created GiveInternet.org — a nonprofit fundraising platform where individuals can sponsor monthly Internet fees and devices for underprivileged high school students living in refugee camps, rural areas and poor families. The project started in 2017 in IDP/Refugee settlements and rural areas of Georgia. By partnering with local schools, EdTec platforms and ISPs, GiveInternet.org equips high school students with Internet access, chromebooks and educational resources.
