= Razhden Gvetadze =

Georgian-Soviet writer and translator

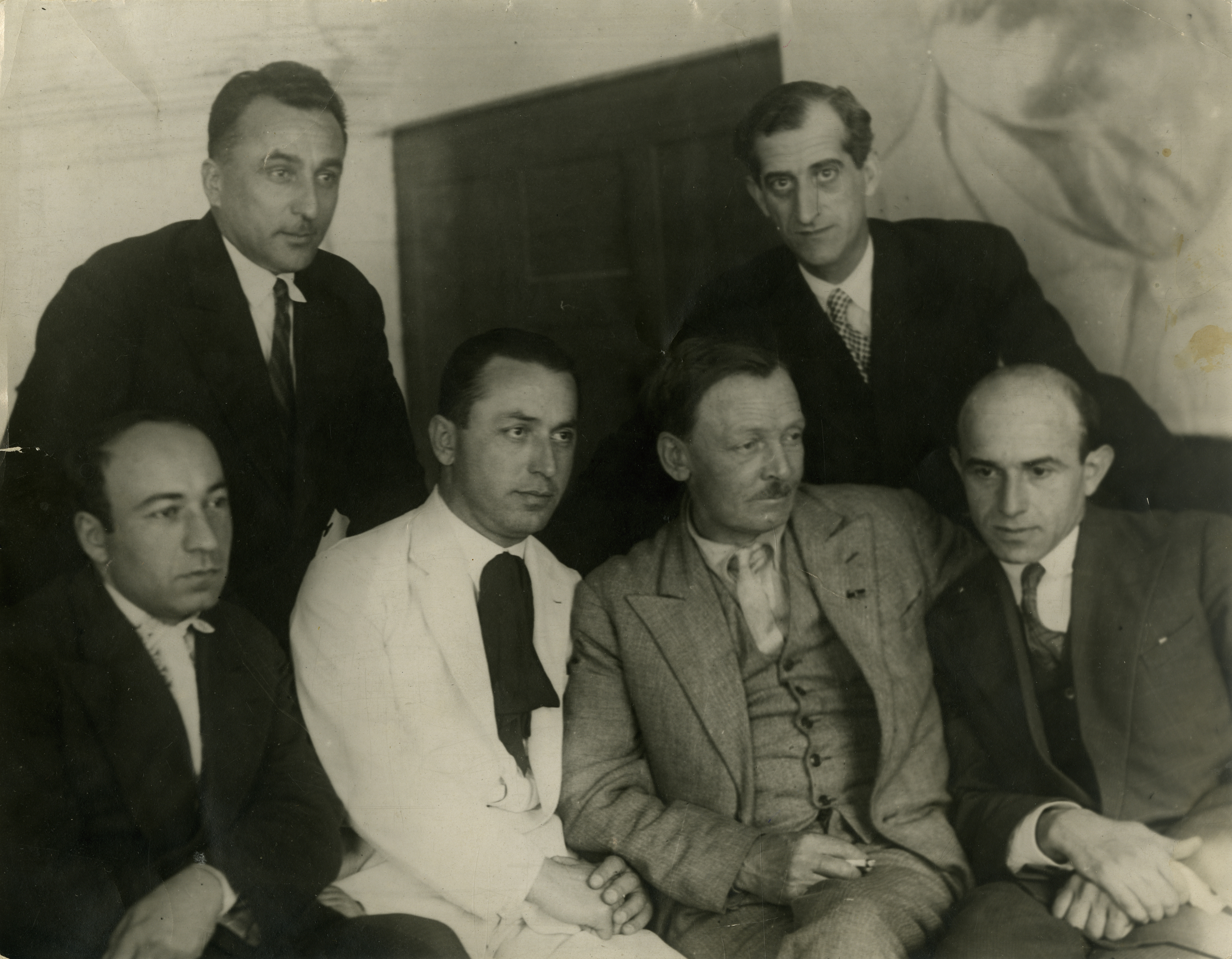
- Georgian writers in 1935. Sitting: Benito Buachidze, Razhden Gvetadze, unknown, Konstantine Lortkipanidze; Standing: Ilo Mosashvili, Alexander Kutateli
- Born: 29 July 1897; Tsikhia, now Tkibuli municipality, Georgia
- Died: 1 December 1952 (aged 55); Tbilisi, Georgia
- Occupations: Writer, translator

Razhden Matveyevich Gvetadze (or Ražden Gvetaże, Georgian: რაჟდენ გვეტაძე, Russian: Ражден Матвеевич Гветадзе; 29 July 1897 – 1 December 1952) was a Georgian Soviet writer and translator.

== Life ==
Razhden Matveyevich Gvetadze was born on 29 July 1897 in Tsikhia, now Tkibuli municipality, Georgia. After graduating from three classes, he was forced to start working. At the same time he studied at the evening school and took his first steps in literature. His poems were first published in 1913, and his first book, The Moonlight Tale, was published in 1915. He was close to the Blue Horns group, which was reflected in his early work, but he was one of the first to move away from these symbolists when the Soviet authority was established in Georgia. His first novel, Theo, published in 1930, described the struggle for the establishment of Soviet authority in Georgia. It was followed by Ciacocona and, in 1935, a collection of stories, Evenings of Lashuri.

Gvetadze devoted many prose and poetic works to World War II. Among the collections are Righteous novels, Life begins again, the poems Letter from a son and many others. The poem Song of Shalamberidze became a popular song. The writer's prose works are distinguished by high professionalism and deep emotions, and his poems are musical and simple.

Gvetadze was engaged in translation. He enriched Georgian literature with translations of world classics such as the ancient epic Ramayana and the French epic The Song of Roland. He also translated the works of Nekrasov, Franko and other Russian, Ukrainian, Armenian and Belarusian writers. In 1935–1950 he headed the publishing house Federation ("Soviet writer").

Gvetadze died on 1 December 1952 in Tbilisi. He was buried in the Didube Pantheon of writers and public figures.

== Works ==
- Teo (1930)
- The Bonfire (1932)
- Evenings in Lashaur (1934)
- Byelorussian Novellas (1935)
- Ramayana – translation (1943)
- the Truthful Novellas series (1943)
- Life Begins Again (1949)

== Sources ==
- Gvetadze Radzhen 1897 - 1952 (in Russian), Russian National Library
- Song of Shalamberidze (in Russian), National Library of Belarus
- Surkov, A. A., ed. (1962–1978), "Gvetadze, Razhden Matveevich", Short Literary Encyclopedia, Soviet Encyclopedia
