= Mikheil Batiashvili =

Georgian politician

Minister of Education, Science, Culture and Sport
- In office 12 July 2018 – 7 November 2019
- President: Giorgi Margvelashvili; Salome Zourabichvili
- Prime Minister: Mamuka Bakhtadze; Giorgi Gakharia
- Preceded by: Mikheil Chkhenkeli
- Succeeded by: Mikheil Chkhenkeli

Personal details
- Born: 21 November 1971 Tbilisi, Georgia
- Party: Georgian Dream
- Education: Tbilisi State University
- Occupation: politician

Mikheil Batiashvili (Georgian: მიხეილ ბატიაშვილი) is a Georgian politician. He was minister of Education, Science, Culture and Sport of Georgia from 12 July 2018 to 7 November 2019, when he resigned.
