= Emil Adelkhanov =

Georgian human rights activist (b. 1945, d. 2016)

Emil Adelkhanov (born Emmanuil Steinberg, 11 August 1945, Vorkuta – 27 June 2016, Tbilisi) was a Georgian human rights activist, and a representative of Amnesty International and Human Rights Watch in Georgia.

== Biography ==
Emil Adelkhanov was born in Vorkutlag in a family of political prisoners. His father was Naum Steinberg (1914–1969), a Ukrainian linguist and Esperanto specialist. His mother was Arfenik Adelkhanova (1905–1950), an Armenian genocide survivor, whose family managed to flee from the Ottoman Empire in 1915 and settle in Tbilisi, and who later was involved in local politics. He was raised first by his grandfather, Shimon Steinberg, and after 1955 by his maternal aunt, Dekhtsanik Adelkhanova, who adopted two of her nephews and changed their names.

In 1969, Adelkhanov graduated from the philological faculty of Tbilisi State University, and started to work as an English translator. In the early 1970s he became a distributor of Samizdat in Tbilisi, including the works by Aleksandr Solzhenitsyn and Nadezhda Mandelstam. Throughout 1970s and 1980s he was collecting data and writing articles for the Chronicle of Current Events, covering Transcaucasia. He played an active role in the struggle for the human rights of Meskhetian Turks and other ethnic minorities in Georgia. From 1992 until the end of his life, he worked at the newly founded Caucasus Institute for Peace, Democracy and Development.
