= Blue Mountains (1983 film) =

Blue Mountains, or unbelievable story
- Directed by: Eldar Shengelaia
- Written by: Rezo Cheishvili; Eldar Shengelaia
- Produced by: Murman Tsintsadze
- Starring: Ramaz Giorgobiani; Sesilia Takaishvili
- Cinematography: Levan Paatashvili
- Edited by: Leonid Ashiani
- Music by: Giya Kancheli
- Production company: Georgian-Film
- Release date: December 18, 1983 (Tbilisi)
- Running time: 95 minutes
- Country: Soviet Union (Georgian SSR)
- Languages: Georgian; Russian; French; German

Blue Mountains (Georgian: ცისფერი მთები ანუ დაუჯერებელი ამბავი, romanized: tsisperi mtebi anu daujerebeli ambavi) is a 1983 Soviet-Georgian comedy-drama film directed by Eldar Shengelaia, and co-written by Rezo Cheishvili. The plot concerns a passive young author (Ramaz Giorgobiani) who enters the Soviet-controlled bureaucracy of Georgia attempting to get his novel published only to be neglected and compartmentalized at every turn. The film was selected for screening as part of the Cannes Classics section at the 2014 Cannes Film Festival.

== Plot ==
Novelist Soso (Ramaz Giorgobiani) goes to his publishing house in an attempt to find someone interested in publishing his latest manuscript. The employees shuffle the author's manuscript around their office from person to person, but everyone seems to be too busy to actually read it. Soso ultimately discovers that the employees are wrapped up in anything but their direct duties and responsibilities so much that not even a giant structural flaw in the building can get their attention. The movie is an allegory of Soviet-time bureaucracy and Soviet system as a whole. At the end of the film, the house collapses and the employees move to another, brand new and modern building. However, that does not mean they change their attitude towards their work ...

== Cast ==
- Ramaz Giorgobiani as Soso - writer.
- Vasil Kakhniashvili as Vaso
- Teimuraz Chirgadze as Director
- Ivane Sakvarelidze as Markscheider
- Sesilia Takaishvili as cashier
- Grigol Natsvlishvili
- Vladimer Mezvrishvili
- Otar Guntsadze
- Darejan Sumbatashvili
- Zeinab Botsvadze
- Nino Tutberidze
- Giorgi Chkhaidze
- Mikheil Kikodze
- Guram Lortkipanidze
- Guram Petriashvili

== Music ==
Music is Composed by Giya Kancheli.
