= Ghia Nodia =

Georgian political analyst and politician

- გია ნოდია
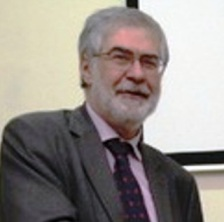
- Ghia Nodia in 2011

Minister of Education and Science
- In office January 31, 2008 – October 27, 2008
- President: Mikheil Saakashvili
- Prime Minister: Vladimer Gurgenidze
- Preceded by: Maia Miminoshvili
- Succeeded by: Nika Gvaramia

Personal details
- Born: September 4, 1954 (age 71) Moscow, Russian SFSR, Soviet Union

Ghia Nodia (Georgian: გია ნოდია) (born 4 September 1954, Moscow, USSR) is a Georgian political analyst who served as the Minister of Education and Science in the Cabinet of Georgia from 31 January 2008 until 27 October 2008.

Nodia graduated from the Department of Philosophy and Psychology at Tbilisi State University (TSU) in 1976 and worked at the Institute of Philosophy of the Georgian Academy of Sciences from 1980 to 2001. He has lectured at the TSU, the Ilia State University, and in the West. Since 1992, he has chaired the Tbilisi-based think-tank Caucasus Institute for Peace, Democracy and Development. He was Minister of Education and Science in 2008. He is currently a director at the International School of Caucasus Studies at the Ilia State University.

Nodia regularly publishes on issues of democracy, nationalism, and regional politics. His "Nationalism and Democracy" (1992) article in the Journal of Democracy is one of the most widely cited pieces of any Georgian scholar, in recent decades.

== Selected publications ==
- Nodia, G. (1992). Nationalism and democracy. Journal of Democracy, 3, 3.
- Nodia, G. and Scholtbach, A.P., The Political Landscape of Georgia: Political Parties, University of Chicago Press, 2006
- Nodia, G. (2014). The revenge of geopolitics. J. Democracy, 25, 139.
- Nodia, G. "The end of the postnational illusion." Journal of Democracy 28.2 (2017): 5-19.

== Sources ==
- Ghia Nodia's article in the Financial Times
