= Caucasus Institute for Peace, Democracy and Development =

Georgia-based think tank

The Caucasus Institute for Peace, Democracy and Development (CIPDD) is a Tbilisi-based think-tank founded in 1992. It is headed by the Georgian political scientist Ghia Nodia. Its main areas of research are: conflict prevention and resolution (with particular emphasis on Javakheti region); political parties; media, especially regional media; security studies and civil-military relations; local self-government development in Georgia, religious minority and education.

In addition, numerous educational projects are implemented by CIPDD in the fields of religious education, conflict resolution, political system and party organization and also other fields. Several translated and original publications were prepared and published by publishing division of CIPDD, Francis Fukuyama's " The End of the History and the Last Man" (Georgian trans.) and discussion series "Debates in Caucasus Institute" among them.

Partner-organizations of CIPDD are: OSCE (including Office of Democratic Institutions and Human Rights - ODIHR); CordAid Foundation (Netherlands), Open Society Institute (USA), Netherlands Institute for Multiparty Democracy - NIMD (Netherlands); other western donors and nongovernmental organizations.

Most of the Institute sponsors are Western governments (like those of the U.S., UK, Austria), Western supranational organizations (NATO), governmental or government funded agencies and programmes (USAID, National Endowment for Democracy, Latvian Institute for International Affairs) and private funds (George Soros' Open Society Foundations).

== See also ==
- Emil Adelkhanov
