= Guram Odisharia =

Georgian writer and politician

Guram Odisharia გურამ ოდიშარია
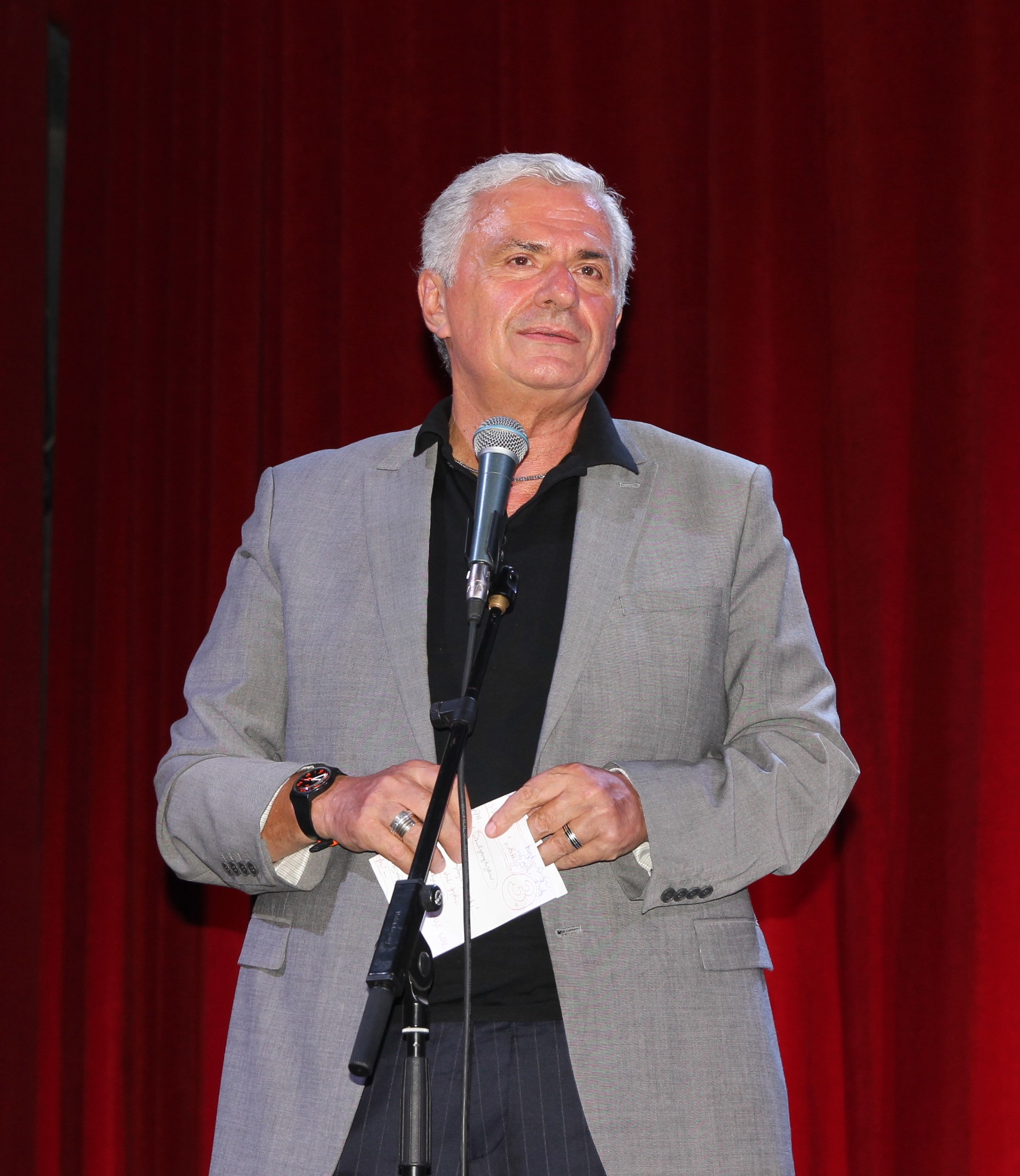

Minister of Culture and Monument Protection of Georgia
- In office 25 October 2012 – 21 July 2014
- President: Mikhail Saakashvili; Giorgi Margvelashvili
- Prime Minister: Bidzina Ivanishvili; Irakli Garibashvili
- Preceded by: Nikoloz Rurua
- Succeeded by: Mikhail Giorgadze

Personal details
- Born: 24 September 1951 (age 75) Sukhumi, Abkhaz ASSR, Georgian SSR, Soviet Union
- Party: Georgian Dream – Democratic Georgia
- Education: Sukhumi State University
- Occupation: Poet, prose writer, playwright, screenwriter, artist

Miriane (Guram) Odisharia (Georgian: მირიანე (გურამ) ოდიშარია; born 24 September 1951) is a Georgian poet, writer, playwright, and public figure. He was won more than ten national and international literary awards. From 2012 to 2014, he served as the Minister of Culture and Monument Protection of Georgia.

Odisharia's works have been translated into more than 20 languages. A native of Abkhazia, Odisharia has been involved Georgian-Abkhazian and Georgian-Ossetian as well as other regional and international meetings dedicated to pressing issues of the conflicts in the Caucasus. He is opposed to wars and has voiced his opinions that all conflicts should be resolved through peace negotiations and direct dialogue.

== Biography ==
Born on 24 September 1951 in Sukhumi, Guram Odisharia graduated from the Faculty of History and Philology of the Abkhazian University in Sukhumi in 1975. At various times he worked as a correspondent for the Sukhumi radio broadcasting, an Abkhazian regional newspaper, as a literary consultant for the Abkhazian Writers' Union, as the editor-in-chief of the Ritsa magazine (1987–1994), and as the director of the Abkhazian branch of the Merani publishing house. His first poem was published in 1969. The war in Abkhazia (1992–1993) displaced him to Tbilisi, Georgia's capital, in a difficult passage through the Sakeni-Chiberi Pass, where hundreds of people died of freezing cold and exhaustion. He later described these days in his work, "The Pass of the Persecuted".

In the following decades, Odisharia was involved in peace activism and participated in more than 60 Georgian-Abkhazian, Georgian-Ossetian, Caucasian and international conferences and meetings. From 2012 to 2014, was the Minister of Culture and Monument Protection of Georgia. In this capacity, in 2014, he signed a document in Berlin whereby Georgia became the Honorary Guest of the 2018 Frankfurt Book Fair. He is married and has a daughter.

== Literary career ==
Guram Odisharia's first poems and drawings were published while he was still in school. He is the author of 10 books of poetry. His best-known works are the novels "The Black Sea Ocean" (2000), "Return to Sukhumi" (1995) and "President's Cat" (2007; a novel translated into 15 languages) and a play "The Far Away Sea", staged by the director Temur Chkheidze in Tbilisi in 2005. His works have been translated into English, Russian, Ukrainian, Abkhazian, Turkish, Armenian, Italian and other languages. While living in exile in Tbilisi, he has also published several collections of short stories, articles and 5 novels. His latest novel "Together without you" was published in 2019.

The main themes of his novels and short stories are the idiosyncrasies of the period since the collapse of the Soviet Union in Georgia and the Caucasus, the essence of war and peace, love and hate at the turn of the 20th–21st centuries (drawing on the example of Georgia), comic or tragic stories of the inhabitants of the writer's hometown before, during, and after the war, stories of salvation from death and human compassion across divides in the most difficult and extreme situations, nostalgia for pre-war coexistence and the hopes of those displaced as a result of the armed conflict, the Black Sea as the protagonist of the writer's works of poetry and prose and the multicultural intersection of societies, the search for new visions that pave the way for new horizons and facilitate the restoration and development of relations between warring parties.

== Awards ==
Odisharia has been awarded the Georgian State Prize, the Ilia Chavchavadze Prize, the Lomisi Publishing House Prize, the Georgian Theater Society Prize, Giorgi Sharvashidze Prize, as well as the Chekhov Gold Medal and the International Association of Journalists Award "Golden Wing", and Alexander Dovzhenk Medal (2016, Ukraine, Kyiv). In 2012, he was voted the "most tolerant person in Georgia" in a survey organized by civil society organizations. In 2017, he was awarded the title of "Defender of Tolerance" by the Council of Religions at the Public Defender's Office.

== Bibliography ==
=== Poetry ===
- “Psalms for you" (Sukhumi, “Alashara” Publishing House, 1978, 44 pgs.)
- "Peace to this House" (Sukhumi, "Alashara", 1982, 60 pgs.)
- “Unintentional Implorings” (Tbilisi, “Merani”, 1984, 86 pgs.)
- “Call on the Rain” (Sukhumi, „Alashara”, 1984, 78 pgs.)
- “Seven Pictures for a Child” (Sukhumi, „Alashara“, 1986, 82 pgs.)
- “Midnight Tree” (Tbilisi, „Merani“, 1990, 100 pgs.)
- “The Key for the Sea” (Sukhumi, „Alashara”, 1991, 140 pgs.)
- “Sonata on Sukhumi and You” (Tbilisi, „Merani”, 1994, 34 pgs.)
- “Psalms for You “ (Tbilisi, 2013, 306 pgs.)
- “One Hundred Verses” (Tbilisi, “Intellect“, 2014, 146 pgs.)

=== Tales ===
- "Salamiyah” (Sukhumi, „Alashara”, 1988, 162 pgs.)

=== Collections of short stories ===
- "The Pass of the Persecuted" (Tbilisi, „Lomisi”, 1993, 64 pgs.)
- "Rain Expected in Sukhumi" (Tbilisi, „Lomisi”, 1997, 132 pgs.)

=== Novels ===
- “Return to Sukhumi” (Tbilisi, „Merani”, 1995, 276 pgs.)
- „The Black Sea Ocean” (Tbilisi, „Merani”, 2000, 440 pgs.)
- „The President’s Cat” (Tbilisi, „Universali”, 2008, 228 pgs.)
- “The Cyclops Bomb” (Tbilisi, „Phorma” 2009, 144 pgs.)
- „Togetherwithoutyou” (Tbilisi, „Intellect”, 2019, 332 pgs.)

=== Journalism ===
- "Planet of Alienation" (Tbilisi, "Caucasian House", 2007, 72 pgs.)
- Documentary-publicist recordings "Transfusion of the Soul" (Tbilisi, "Intellect", 2012 234 pgs.)

=== Plays ===
- „… The Far Away Sea” (Tbilisi, 2005)

=== Translations ===
- Daur Nachkebia (famous Abkhazian writer) novel "Night Shore" (Tbilisi, "Family Library", 2011)
