= Maia Miminoshvili =

Georgian physicist and politician

Maia Miminoshvili მაია მიმინოშვილი

Minister of Education and Science
- In office 22 November 2007 – 31 January 2008
- President: Mikheil Saakashvili; Nino Burjanadze (Acting); Mikheil Saakashvili
- Prime Minister: Lado Gurgenidze
- Preceded by: Alexander Lomaia
- Succeeded by: Ghia Nodia

Personal details
- Born: 1 August 1960 (age 66) Tbilisi, Georgian SSR, Soviet Union
- Education: Tbilisi State University

Maia Miminoshvili (Georgian: მაია მიმინოშვილი; born 1 August 1960), is a Georgian physicist and politician, Minister of Education and Science between 2007 and 2008 in the cabinet of Lado Gurgenidze.

Born in Tbilisi, she got a degree in Mechanics and Maths for the Tbilisi State University in 1988.

On 2008 was named director of the National Assessment & Examinations Center until 28 May 2012, when Minister Dimitri Shashkini fired her. When Georgian Dream came to the power in the 2012 parliamentary election, Miminoshvili was renamed director of the NAEC until was dismissed again on 10 September 2018- by Education Minister Mikheil Batiashvili.
