= Guram Panjikidze =

Georgian writer

- Born: 22 April 1933; Tiflis, Georgian SSR, Soviet Union
- Died: 1997; Tbilisi, Georgia
- Occupations: Writer, editor

Guram Panjikidze (Georgian: ფანჯიკიძე გურამ; 22 April 1933 – 1997) was a Georgian novelist, journalist and editor. At least three of his works were the basis for movies.

== Life ==
Guram Panjikidze was born in Tbilisi, Georgia on 22 April 1933. He graduated from Georgia Technical University in 1956 and soon after began work at the Rustavi Metallurgical Plant. His work in the metal industry played an important role in his writing, which dates back to the 1950s. In addition to being a novelist, Panjikidze was a journalist and author of numerous popular science articles. Between 1974 and 1977 he worked as editor-in-chief of the literary magazines Tsiskari and Gantiadi. From 1979 he was the director of the publishing house "Soviet Georgia".

Guram Panjikidze died suddenly in 1997. He is buried in the Didube Pantheon of Writers and Public Figures. Several films are based on his novels, including Levan Khidasheli, Precious Gem and Spirali. In May 2013 the National Library of Georgia held a celebration of the writer's 80th anniversary in the grand events hall.

== Work ==
In 1964 Guram Panjikidze's first short stories - Sunset, Rashida and A Snowy Day - were published, followed by his first novel, The Seventh Sky, which appeared in Tsiskari magazine and was immediately successful in his country. It was followed by the novels The Precious Gem and The Year of the Active Sun (აქტიური მზის წელიწადი), a work that would win the Shota Rustaveli state award in 1979. In 1985 another of his most acclaimed novels was published, Spiral (სპირალი), which deals with a subject as controversial as brain implantation, when the brain of a dying teacher is implanted in a young person, who turns out to be a criminal. The novel became the best-selling book of the 1980s and remains an essential work in Georgian science fiction to this day. Of a very different nature is his novel The Devil's Wheel (ეშმაკის ბორბალი, 1994 ), which tells the story of Archil Gordeli, whose family was the victim of Soviet repression.

The main characteristic of Panjikidze's texts is their dry, technocratic and laconic style, which coincides with and describes the world of alienated characters with technical professions who generally live in large cities. Today he remains one of the most recognized Georgian authors and his literary legacy is constantly reissued.

== Bibliography ==
- The Seventh Heaven (1967)
- The Precious Gem (1972)
- The Year of the Active Sun (1979)
- Argentina, Argentina (1979)
- Dynamo, Dynamo, Dynamo (1981)
- The Spiral (1985)
- Maradona Rey (1987)
- Georgia Immortality (1988)
- The truth, only the truth (1990)
- Three novels (1990)
- Devil's Wheel (1994)
- Big Bang (1997)
- Requiem (2003)

== Sources ==
- "გურამ ფანჯიკიძე (1933-1997)", geonecropol.com (in Georgian)
- Panjikidze Guram, Georgian National Book Center, 2014
- Spiral – Panjikidze Guram, Georgian National Book Center, 2014
- The Devil's Wheel, Panjikidze Guram, Georgian National Book Center)
- "Writer Guram Panjikidze – 80", Georgian Journal, 8 May 2013
