= Khatuna Gogaladze =

Georgian politician

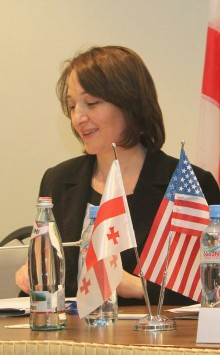
- Gogaladze in 2013

Ministry of Environment and Natural Resources Protection of Georgia
- In office October 25, 2012 – July 26, 2014
- President: Giorgi Margvelashvili (after 2013); Mikheil Saakashvili (–2013)
- Prime Minister: Irakli Garibashvili (after 2013); Bidzina Ivanishvili (–2013)
- Succeeded by: Elguja Khokrishvili

Personal details
- Born: April 18, 1970 (age 55) Khashuri, Georgian SSR
- Party: Georgian Dream
- Occupation: Biologist

Khatuna Gogaladze (Georgian: ხათუნა გოგალაძე; born 18 April 1970) is a Georgian politician. Between 2012 and 2014 she was Minister of Environment and Natural Resources Protection in the cabinets of Bidzina Ivanishvili and Irakli Garibashvili.

She has a degree in biology from the Ivane Javakhishvili Tbilisi State University and master's degrees in Public Affairs from Indiana University Bloomington, and in Environmental Sciences and Policy from Central European University, Budapest.
