= Georgian Institute of Public Affairs =

College in Tbilisi, Georgia

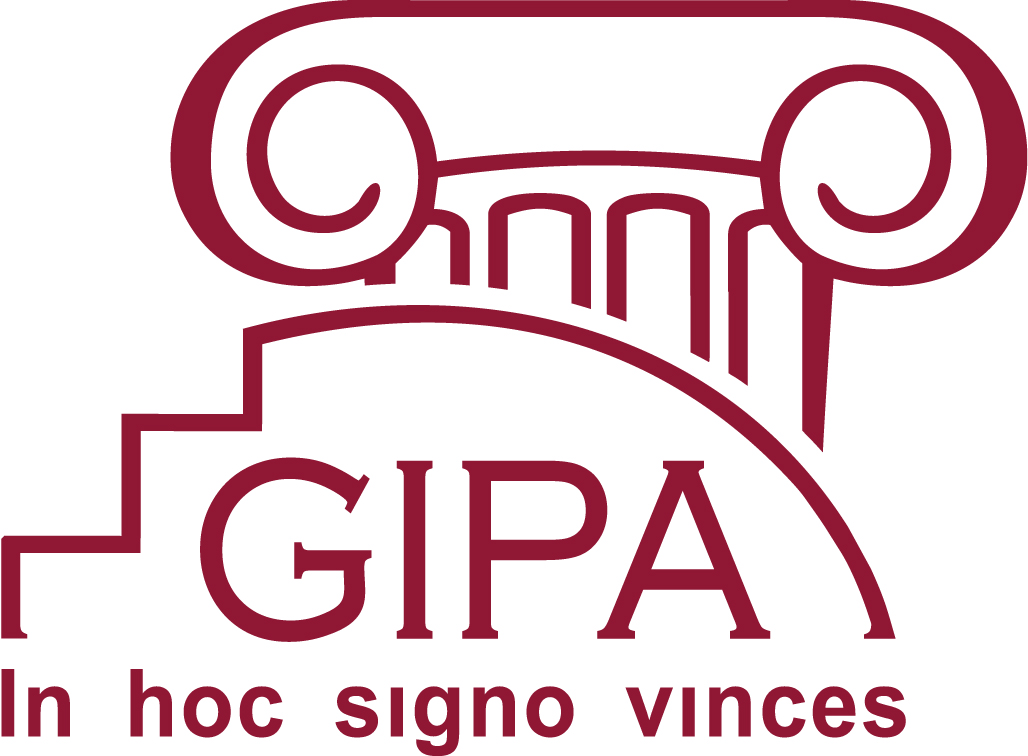
- Other names: GIPA
- Motto: In hoc signo vinces
- Motto in English: In this sign you will conquer
- Type: Private
- Established: 1994; 32 years ago
- Rector: Maka Ioseliani
- Location: Tbilisi, Georgia; 41°42′07″N 44°47′53″E
- Student Media: Radio GIPA (FM 94.3); Brosse Street Journal
- Colors
- Website: www.gipa.ge

The Georgian Institute of Public Affairs (GIPA) (Georgian: საქართველოს საზოგადოებრივ საქმეთა ინსტიტუტი, romanized: sakartvelos sazogadoebriv sakmeta inst'it'ut'i) was created in 1994 in Tbilisi, Georgia. Four separate schools of the Institute offer MA, BA programs and training courses in the spheres of Public Affairs, Local Governance, Journalism, International Affairs and Law, as well as a PhD program in the social sciences. GIPA is considered one of the top three universities in Georgia, alongside the Free University of Tbilisi and Tbilisi State University.

The Georgian Institute of Public Affairs is a national center for development of practices in Public Administration, Law, Politics and Journalism. Since its establishment, GIPA brought together leaders from business, media, civil society and public services to contribute to developing effective governance at state, municipal and local levels as well as independent and viable media in Georgia through interactive education programs, research and training.

The university is governed by a board, some of which are appointed by the existing members whereas others are elected by the university academic board. The board also appoints the rector, who, as an executive director of the university, is responsible for its strategic development. Previous directors of GIPA include Giorgi Margvelashvili.

Apart from graduate degree and certified training programs, GIPA carries out many research and training projects. It also publishes student newspaper "Brosse Street Journal" and manages the first English-language and student run Radio GIPA.

== Schools and programs ==
- School of Government
- Caucasus School of Journalism and Media Management
- School of Law and Politics
- School of Social Sciences
- PhD Program in Social Sciences
- Georgian Rural Development Department

== Notable alumni ==
- Davit Bakradze
- Archil Talakvadze
- Tamar Sanikidze
- Zurab Japaridze
