= Rezo Cheishvili =

- Born: 24 April 1933; Kutaisi, Georgia
- Died: 11 September 2015 (aged 82); Kutaisi, Georgia
- Occupations: Novelist, short story writer, screenwriter
- Writing career
- Literary movement: Magic realism

Revaz "Rezo" Cheishvili (Georgian: რევაზ „რეზო“ ჭეიშვილი; 24 April 1933 – 11 September 2015) was a Georgian writer and scriptwriter.

== Biography ==
Cheishvili was born in Kutaisi, Georgian SSR, Soviet Union in 1933. He moved to the capital in 1954 to continue his studies. In 1958 he graduated from Tbilisi State University with a degree in Georgian language and literature.

He worked from 1961 to 1992 at the 'Georgian Film' studio as an editor, as a member of the Film Script Administrative Board, as a member of the Creative Association and as one of its leaders. He edited various Georgian literary journals and newspapers, including Gantiadi.

Rezo Cheishvili was the scriptwriter of feature-length films My Friend Nodari, Samanishvili’s Stepmother and the widely famed The Blue Mountains, which was directed by noted Georgian director Eldar Shengelaia.

Cheishvili's short stories and novels have been published in several countries.

== Bibliography ==
- Blue Mountains (1980); Bakur Sulakauri Publishing (2013)
- Oh, My Vineyard, Merani Publishing (1987); Bakur Sulakauri Publishing (2003)
- First, Sov. Georgia Publishing (1988)
- Selected Works in two Volumes, Sov. Georgia (1989-1993)
- My Friend Nodar, Nakaduli Publishing (1990)
- Dali, Merani Publishing (1992)
- Robbers, Merani Publishing (1999)
- A Comet, Merani Publishing (1999)
- Third Way: About Kutaisi and others, Kutaisi publishing Centre (2003)
- Selected Short Stories, Kutaisi publishing Centre (2003)
- Month of Ripening, Kutaisi publishing Centre (2003)
- Three Novels, Kutaisi publishing Centre (2003)
- Red Flower of Wild Rose, Palitra L Publishing (2010)
- Works in Seven Volumes, Kutaisi publishing Centre (2010-2012)
- New Kuru, Palitra L Publishing (2011)

== Recognition ==
- USSR State Award for the script of The Blue Mountains (1984)
- Rustaveli Award (1985)
- Honorary SABA award (2012)
