= Ministry of Education, Science, Culture and Sport of Georgia =

Government ministry of Georgia

Ministry of Education, Science, Culture Of Georgia
- საქართველოს განათლების, მეცნიერების, კულტურისა და სპორტის სამინისტრო
- Coat of Arms of Georgia

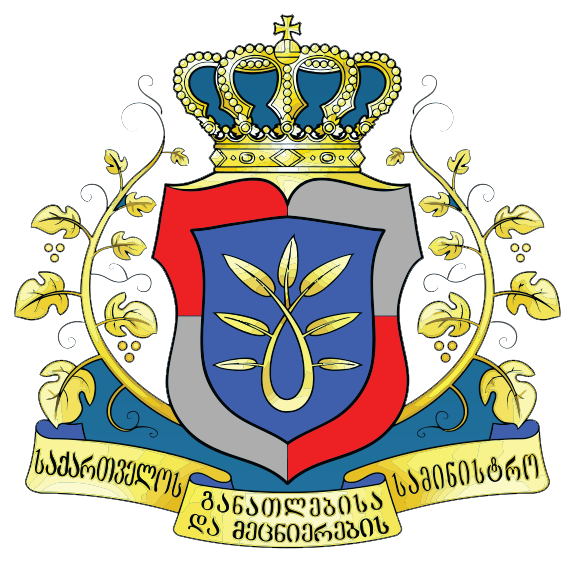
- Logo

Agency overview
- Jurisdiction: Government of Georgia
- Headquarters: Tbilisi, Dimitri Uznadze N 52, Tbilisi, Georgia 0102
- Annual budget: ₾2.03 billion (USD 764.7 million) (2023).
- Agency executive: Givi Mikanadze, Minister of Education, Science, Culture and Sport
- Website: www.mes.gov.ge

The Ministry of Education, Science, Culture and Sport of Georgia (Old name – Ministry of Education and Science; Georgian: საქართველოს განათლების, მეცნიერების, კულტურისა და სპორტის სამინისტრო) is a governmental body responsible for education system and children's services in Georgia. Ministry of Education works under the Minister of Education and Science of Georgia. The ministry is located on Uzandze street in Tbilisi in a historical building built in Mauritanic style.

== Budget ==
The budget of the Ministry of Education and Science in 2023 was GEL 2.03 billion (US$764.7 million), up by GEL 345.9 million (US$130.5 million) compared to the 2022 state budget.

== Ministers ==
=== Ministers of Georgian Democratic Republic ===
- Giorgi Laskhishvili, 26 May 1918 – 21 March 1919
- Noe Ramishvili, 21 March 1919 – 1920
- Grigol Lortkipanidze, 1920 – 1921
- Mamia Orakhelashvili, 1921 – 1922

=== Education commissaries of Georgian SSR ===
- David Kandelaki, 1922 – 1929
- Gaioz Devdariani, 1929 – 1931
- Mamia Orakhelashvili (Second Time), 1931 – 1933
- Ermillo Bedia, 1933 – 1934
- Akaki Tatarashvili, 1934 – 1936
- Malakia Toroshelidze, 1936 – 1937
- Kote Chkuaseli, 1937
- Ermile Burchuladze, 1937 – 1938
- George Kiknadze, 1938 – 1944
- Viktor Kupradze, 1944 – 1953

=== Ministers of Higher and Secondary Special Education of Georgian SSR ===
- Giorgi Jibladze, 1953 – 1960
- Tamar Lashkarashvili, 1960 – 1976
- Otar Kinkladze, 1976 – 1986
- Natela Vasadze, 1986 – 1988
- Guram Enukidze, 1988 – 1990

=== Ministers of Education of Republic of Georgia ===
- Lia Andguladze, 1990 – 1991
- Elizbar Javelidze, 1991 – 1992
- Gucha Kvaratskhelia, 13 January 1992 – 20 December 1992
- Kote Gabashvili, 1992 – 1993
- Tamaz Kvachantiradze, 1993 – 1998
- Aleksander Kartozia, 6 August 1998 – 17 February 2004

=== Ministers after 2004 ===
- Alexander Lomaia, 17 February 2004 – 19 November 2007
- Maia Miminoshvili, 22 November 2007 – 31 January 2008
- Ghia Nodia, 31 January 2008 – 27 October 2008
- Nika Gvaramia, 27 October 2008 – 8 December 2009
- Dimitri Shashkin, 8 December 2009 – 4 July 2012
- Khatia Dekanoidze, 4 July 2012 – 25 October 2012
- Giorgi Margvelashvili, 25 October 2012 – 18 July 2013
- Tamar Sanikidze, 18 July 2013 – 3 June 2016
- Aleksandre Jejelava, 3 June 2016 – 20 June 2018
- Mikheil Chkhenkeli, 20 June 2018 – 14 July 2018
- Mikheil Batiashvili, 12 July 2018 – 7 November 2019 (as Minister of Education, Science, Sports and Culture)
- Mikheil Chkhenkeli, 13 November 2019 – 20 March 2023
- Giorgi Amilakhvari, 20 March 2023 – 28 September 2024
- Alexander Tsuladze, 2 October 2024 – 30 June 2025
- Givi Mikanadze, 30 June 2025 – Present
