= Tamar Sanikidze =

Georgian politician

- თამარ სანიკიძე

Minister of Education and Science
- In office 18 July 2013 – 3 June 2016
- President: Mikheil Saakashvili; Giorgi Margvelashvili
- Prime Minister: Bidzina Ivanishvili; Irakli Garibashvili; Giorgi Kvirikashvili
- Preceded by: Giorgi Margvelashvili
- Succeeded by: Aleksandre Jejelava

Personal details
- Born: 30 October 1978 (age 47) Tbilisi, Georgian SSR, Soviet Union

Tamar Sanikidze (Georgian: თამარ სანიკიძე) (born 30 October 1978 in Tbilisi) is a Georgian politician, Minister of Education and Science of Georgia since 18 July 2013 until the announcement of her resignation on June 3, 2016.

== Education ==
Ms. Sanikidze attained a doctoral degree for her research on automated systems for academic programs development and evaluation. She holds a master’s degree in Public Administration, a bachelor’s degree in English Language and Literature and has a background in financial management (ACCA).

== Posts Held ==
Tamar Sanikidze has more than 25 years of professional experience. Since 1998, Ms. Sanikidze has held various executive positions in private, non-governmental, international and public institutions. Since 2008, she has been actively involved in the field of education and has provided administrative, academic and consultation services to various education institutions. She has extensive experience in higher education quality assurance systems management.

From 2012 to 2013, Ms. Sanikidze acted as the First Deputy Minister of Education and Science of Georgia and later, during 2013 to 2016, as Minister of Education and Science of Georgia. From July 2016 to September 2018, she held the position of Director of the National Center for Educational Quality Enhancement (NCEQE) in Georgia. Since 2017, she has been engaged in development of higher education systems as a Higher Education Reform Expert of the Erasmus+ programme. In November 2018, she became a member of the International Institute for Education Policy Planning and Management (EPPM) think tank organisation. Since 2021 Tamar serves as an Assessor for recognition of accreditation programme of World Federation of Medical Education (WFME).

Since June 2020, Ms. Sanikidze has led the World Bank-funded project Innovation, Inclusion and Quality (I2Q) that supports the implementation of the national education system reform agenda.

== Criticisms ==
Sanikidze's tenure as Education Minister came under repeated criticism for the low number of teachers who passed their professional exams.
