= Alexander Kutateli =

Georgian and Soviet writer and translator

Alexander Nikoloz Kutateli
- ალექსანდრე ნიკოლოზის ძე ქუთათელი
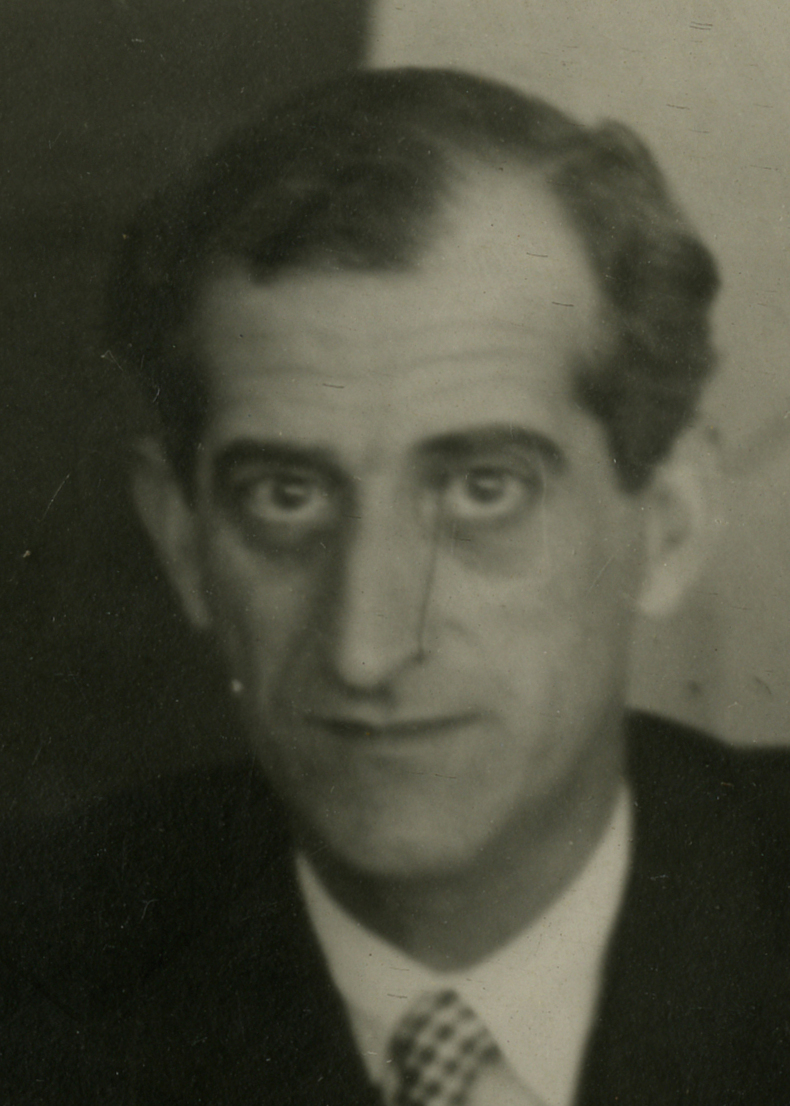
- Born: Alexander Nikoloz Kutateladze; 6 September 1897; Kutais, Kutaisi Governorate, Caucasus Viceroyalty, Russian Empire
- Died: 1 May 1982 (aged 84); Tbilisi, Georgian SSR, Soviet Union
- Occupations: Writer, translator

Alexander Nikoloz Kutateli Georgian: ალექსანდრე ნიკოლოზის ძე ქუთათელი; 6 September 1897 – 1 May 1982) was a Georgian and Soviet writer and translator.

== Life ==
He was born in Kutaisi, son of a lawyer. He studied at Tbilisi University, but did not graduate. His drama The Snake of Hirse was published in 1924. He was active in the Georgian literary milieu. He was author of Poems (1937 and 1941) and Fighters (1942), a collection of stories. He is best known for the novel Face to Face published in four volumes from 1933 to 1952 which covers the fight of the people against the counter-revolutionary Mensheviks.

== Sources ==
- Kankawa, G. I. (2002), "KUTATELI (real name - Kutateladze), Alexander Nikolaevich (КУТАТЕ́ЛИ (наст. фамилия — Кутателадзе), Александр Николаевич)", Russian Literature and Folklore (in Russian)
