= Benito Buachidze =

Literary critic

Benito Mikheili Buachidze
- ბენიტო ბუაჩიძე
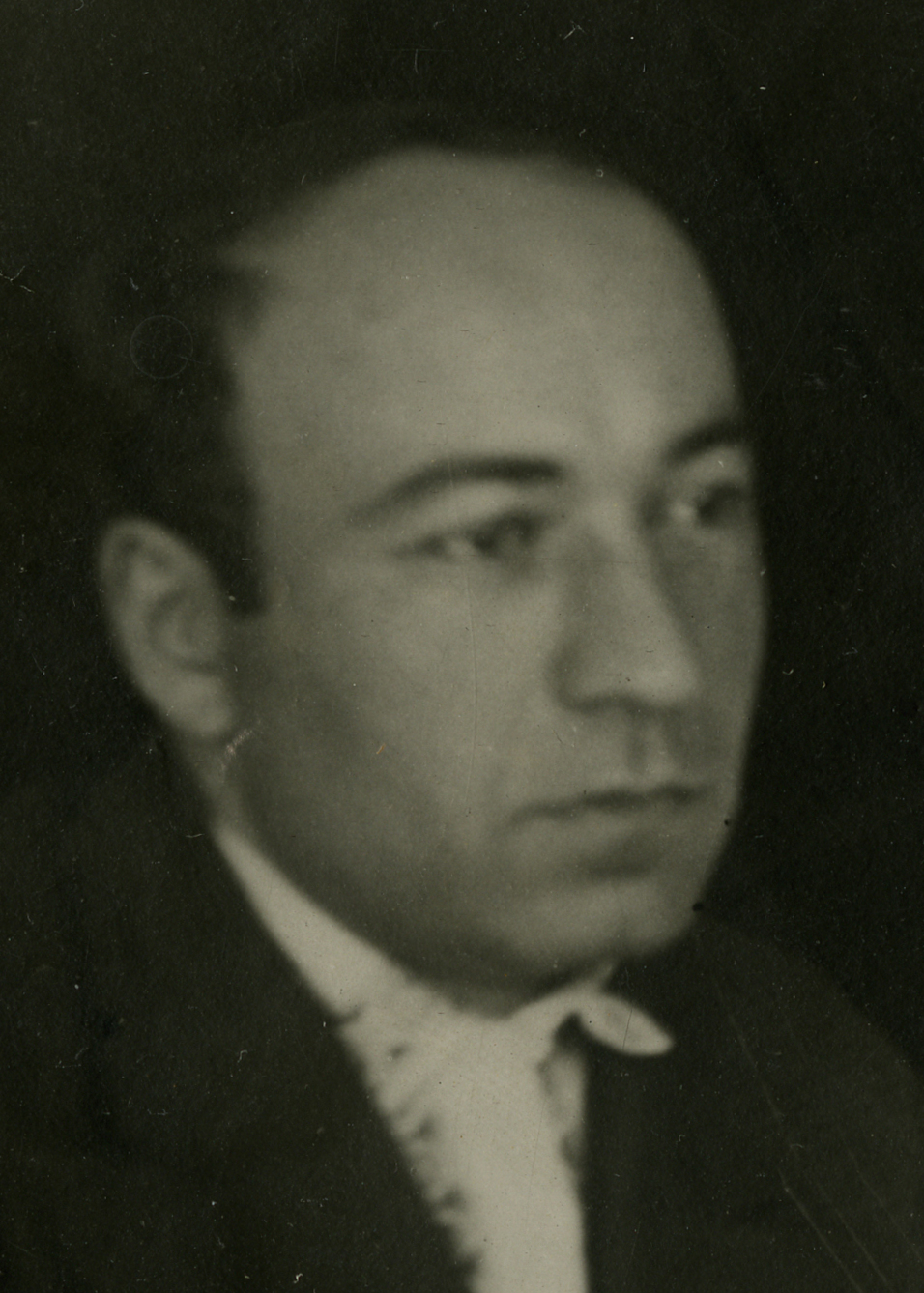
- Born: 2 September 1905; Partskhnali, Kharagauli district, Georgia
- Died: 3 October 1937 (aged 32)
- Occupation: Literary critic

Benito Mikheili Buachidze (Georgian: ბენიტო ბუაჩიძე; 2 September 1905 – 3 October 1937) was a Georgian literary critic. He was a member of the SCCP since 1926. He was the brother of Kita Buachidze.

== Biography ==
Benito Buachidze was one of the first ideological leaders and organizers of Georgian and Transcaucasian proletarian writing. Buachidze had adopted the name "Benito" with reference to Benito Mussolini, who in the 1920s was seen as a modernizing figure in the style of Futurism. In 1926–28 he was elected Secretary of the Union of Georgian and Transcaucasian Proletarian Writing Associations. He contributed to the newspaper Zaria Vostok.

Buachidze was a member of the editorial board of the magazine "На литературном посту" and the editor of the magazine "На рубеже Востока". In 1932 he worked as a senior researcher at the Institute of Literature of the Moscow Communist Academy. In 1934 he was appointed Dean of the Faculty of Literature of Tbilisi State University.

In his works Buachidze developed the issues of the development of Soviet literature, the problems of realism and romanticism, the revolutionary traditions of Soviet art. Among Buachidze's books are: Struggle for Hegemony (1930), Creative Issues of Fiction (1933) and Ways of Contemporary Georgian Literature (1934). He wrote about Ilia Chavchavadze, Mikheil Javakhishvili, Galaktion Tabidze, Vladimir Mayakovsky and Nikoloz Ostrovsky.

Benito Buachidze was arrested on 22 July 1937 and convicted on 3 October 1937 by the passing session of the Military Board of the Supreme Court of the USSR. He was accused of counterrevolution and sentenced to the highest measure of punishment - shooting. He was rehabilitated posthumously on 25 June 1956.

== Sources ==
- "Buachidze Benito Mikheilis dze (ბუაჩიძე ბენიტო მიხეილის ძე)", National Parliamentary Library of Georgia
- "Buachidze Benito Mikhailovich (Буачидзе Бенито Михайлович)", Stalin's lists from Georgia (Сталинские списки из Грузии) (in Russian)
- "BOUCHIDZE, Benito Mikhailovich (БУАЧИ́ДЗЕ, Бенито Михайлович)", Русская литература и фольклор (in Russian), 2002
- "Benito Buachidze (ბენიტო ბუაჩიძე)", Georgia (Encyclopedia), vol. 1, Tbilisi, 1997
