= Ilo Mosashvili =

Ilo Onysymovych Mosashvili
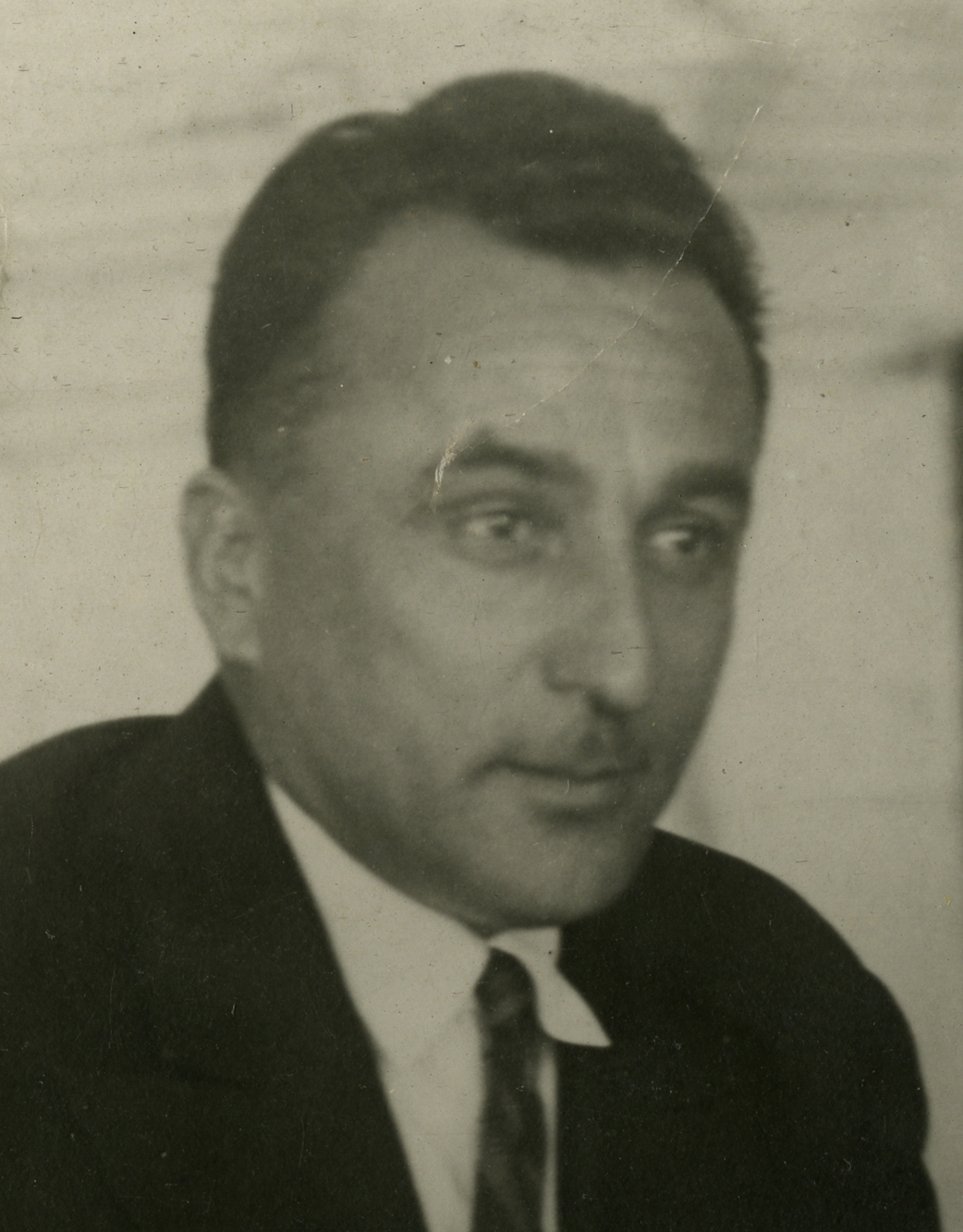
- Born: 7 January 1896; Chargali village, Dusheti uezd, Tiflis Governorate, Russian Empire
- Died: 4 August 1954 (aged 58); Tbilisi, Georgian SSR, Soviet Union
- Occupations: Writer, playwright, translator

Ilo Onysymovych Mosashvili (Georgian: ილო მოსაშვილი; 7 January 1896 – 4 August 1954) was a Georgian and Soviet writer, playwright and translator.

== Life ==
Ilo Mosashvili was born in Chargali village, now in Dusheti municipality, Georgia. He studied at the St. Petersburg Psycho-Neurological Institute from 1914 to 1917. He graduated from Kharkov University, Faculty of Law. He was editor-in-chief of the magazine Schultz and editor of the newspaper Communist from 1926 to 1932. From 1937 to 1940 he was Director of the Georgia Literary Foundation.

Mosashvili's first poem was published in the newspaper Light in 1911. He also published short stories, essays and plays. Several of his poems became songs. He wrote works for children, and translated works by Shevchenko, Franko, Mayakovsky and Essenin.

After World War II (1939–1944) Mosashvili mainly worked in drama. His play Chief of the Station (სადგურის უფროსი; 1947) was about the heroic defense of the Caucasus in World War II. Sunken Stones (ჩაძირული ქვები; 1949) was about the life of Georgians in Turkey and elsewhere. It won the Stalin Prize in 1951.

Mosashvili died in Tbilisi. He is buried in the Didube Pantheon, Tbilisi.

== Membership ==
- Writers Union Board, Member
- Presidium of the Writers' Union, Member
- Radical Democratic Party, Member (1917-1918)
- Union of Soviet Writers of Georgia, Member (1934-)
- Supreme Council of the Georgian SSR, MP
- Presidium of the Supreme Council of the Georgian SSR, member

== Awards ==
- Stalin Prize 2nd class (1951)
- Order of Lenin (10 November 1950)
- Order of the Red Banner of Labour (31 January 1939)
- Medal "For Valiant Labour in the Great Patriotic War 1941–1945"

== Works ==
=== Screenplays ===
Mosashvili wrote screenplays for six films:

- Arshaula (Cкала Аршаула; 1935)
- Across the River (За рекой; 1935)
- Two Friends (Два друга; 1937)
- Girl from the Other Side (Девушка с того берега; 1940)
- The Sentry Box (В сторожевой будке; 1941)
- He Will Come Back (Он еще вернется: 1943)

=== Other ===
- Seagull (Story), Tbilisi: Sakhelgami, 1932, p. 35
- Rozga Chapar (Poem), Tbilisi: Sakhelgami, 1934, p. 27
- Together (Children's Poem), Tbilisi: Sakhelgami, 1935, p. 12
- Strange Animal (A Poem for a Youth), Tbilisi: Sakhelgami, 1937, p. 35

== Sources ==
- "Ilo Mosashvili (Ило Мосашвили)", kinopoisk.ru (in Russian)
- Mchedlishvili, David A. (2010–2012), "Ilo Mosashvili (ილო მოსაშვილი)", Biographical Dictionary (in Georgian)
- "Mosashvili Ilo Onysymovych (Мосашвілі Іло Онисимович)", Encyclopedia of Modern Ukraine (in Ukrainian)
