= Giorgi Margvelashvili =

4th President of Georgia (2013–2018)

- გიორგი მარგველაშვილი
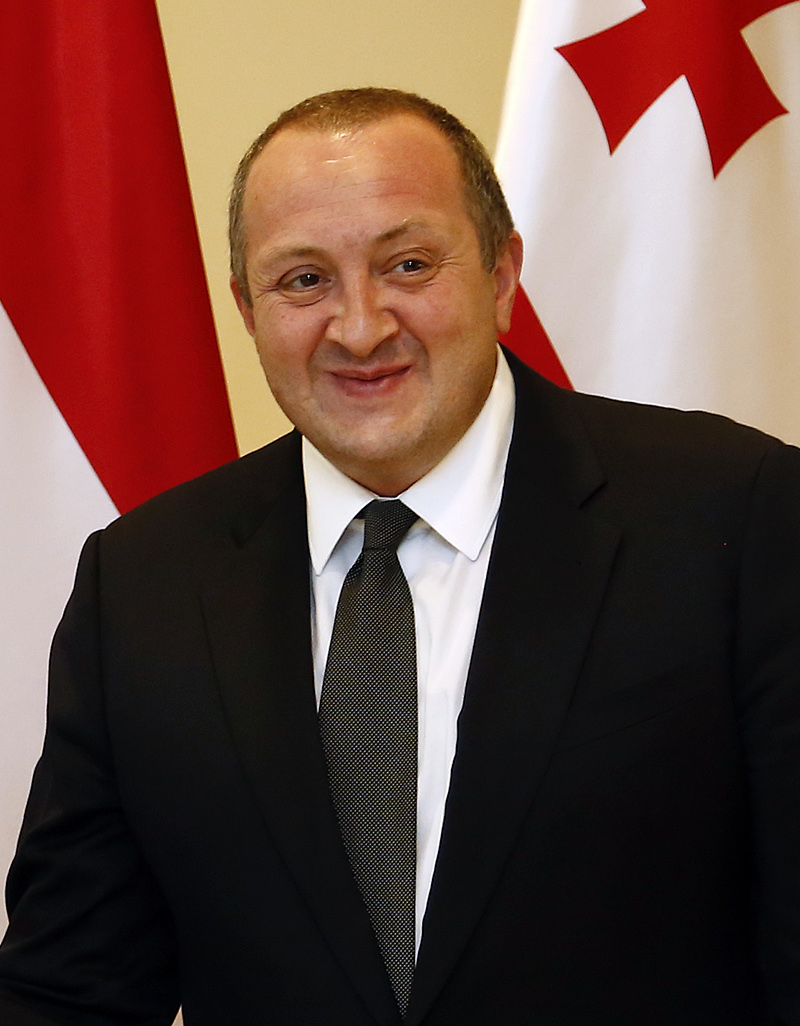
- Margvelashvili in 2014

4th President of Georgia
- In office 17 November 2013 – 16 December 2018
- Prime Minister: Bidzina Ivanishvili; Irakli Garibashvili; Giorgi Kvirikashvili; Mamuka Bakhtadze
- Preceded by: Mikheil Saakashvili
- Succeeded by: Salome Zourabichvili

First Deputy Prime Minister of Georgia
- In office 23 January 2013 – 18 July 2013
- President: Mikheil Saakashvili
- Prime Minister: Bidzina Ivanishvili
- Preceded by: Irakli Alasania
- Succeeded by: Giorgi Kvirikashvili

Minister of Education and Science
- In office 25 October 2012 – 18 July 2013
- President: Mikheil Saakashvili
- Prime Minister: Bidzina Ivanishvili
- Preceded by: Khatia Dekanoidze
- Succeeded by: Tamar Sanikidze

Personal details
- Born: 4 September 1969 (age 57) Tbilisi, Georgian SSR, Soviet Union (now Tbilisi, Georgia)
- Party: Independent (Note: Supported by and affiliated with Georgian Dream between 2012–2013.) (since 2003); Strong Georgia (since 2024); Georgian Dream (2012-2013); Burjanadze-Democrats (2003)
- Spouse(s): Anastasia Virsaladze; Khatuna Abashidze; Maka Chichua (m. 2014)
- Children: 3
- Education: Tbilisi State University; Central European University; Georgian National Academy of Sciences

Giorgi Margvelashvili (Georgian: გიორგი მარგველაშვილი; born 4 September 1969) is a Georgian academic and politician who was the fourth president of Georgia, in office from 17 November 2013 to 16 December 2018.

Having studied philosophy in university, he was twice the rector of the Georgian Institute of Public Affairs from 2000 to 2006 and again from 2010 to 2012. In October 2012, he became a member of the newly formed cabinet of Bidzina Ivanishvili as Minister of Education and Science of Georgia. In February 2013, he was additionally appointed as First Deputy Prime Minister. Margvelashvili was named by the Ivanishvili-led Georgian Dream coalition as its presidential candidate in May 2013 and he won the October 2013 presidential election with 62% of votes.

With Margvelashvili's election, a new constitution came into effect, significantly curtailing the president's powers in favor of the Prime Minister and the Parliament. Shortly thereafter, Margvelashvili's relations with Ivanishvili and the ruling Georgian Dream party leadership soured to the point of a full split. He was the first president in Georgia's history not to seek reelection for a second term.

== Education and academic career ==
Giorgi Margvelashvili was born in Tbilisi in the family of Teimuraz Margvelashvili (born 1938), an engineer, and Mzeana Gomelauri (born 1933), a psychologist. Margvelashvili graduated from the Tbilisi State University in 1992 with a degree in philosophy. He continued his post-graduate education at the Central European University in Budapest, Hungary (1993–1994) and the Institute of Philosophy, Georgian Academy of Sciences (1993–1996). In 1998, he obtained a doctorate in philosophy from the Tbilisi State University. Early in the 1990s he worked as a mountain guide at the Caucasus Travel agency.

He joined National Democratic Institute's Tbilisi office as a program consultant in 1995 and worked for it before becoming affiliated with the Georgian Institute of Public Affairs, a joint Georgian–United States educational establishment, in 2000. Margvelashvili twice served as a rector of the institute from 2000 to 2006 and, again, from 2010 to 2012. In between his two tenures as a rector, he headed the research department from 2006 to 2010. During these years, he was a frequent commentator on politics and society of Georgia.

== Political career ==
Margvelashvili was not a household name in Georgia until 2012. His first direct involvement in politics briefly came in 2003, when he joined the opposition election bloc Burjanadze-Democrats prior to the November 2003 parliamentary election, being in the top ten of the bloc's list of candidates. After the allegation of electoral fraud brought about street protests and a change of power in the Rose Revolution, the Burjanadze-Democrats merged with the Mikheil Saakashvili-led United National Movement, and Margvelashvili quit politics.

In 2008, Margvelashvili was again associated with Nino Burjanadze, the former parliamentary chairwoman, this time as a member of the board of advisers of Burjanadze's think-tank Foundation for Democracy and Development. By 2012, Margvelashvili had become a critic of Mikheil Saakashvili's government. He publicly supported the Georgian Dream coalition set up by the billionaire tycoon Bidzina Ivanishvili, but he was not directly involved in the coalition's election campaign.

=== Government minister ===
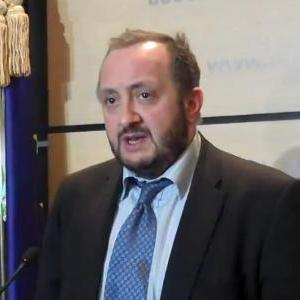
Giorgi Margvelashvili as Minister of Education in May 2013.

After the victory over Saakashvili's party in the October 2012 parliamentary election brought Ivanishvili to the premiership of Georgia, Margvelashvili, described by Ivanishvili as "a personal friend" and "an intellectual", became Minister of Education and Science on 25 October 2012. In February 2013, Ivanishvili appointed Margvelashvili as First Deputy Prime Minister, replacing on this position Irakli Alasania, the Defense Minister.

Margvelashvili's program as a minister envisaged several changes in the educational system, including a model of school graduation exams, the role of schools, and the financial independence of universities.

During his tenure, Margvelashvili came to public attention several times. In March 2013, he was accused by the opposition and student groups of political meddling in academia after his ministry revoked authorization of the Tbilisi-based Agrarian University, run by a foundation founded by Kakha Bendukidze, an entrepreneur and ex-minister in the Saakashvili government. Within two weeks, the authorization to the Agrarian University was renewed after the ministry said that the shortcomings had been addressed. In April 2013, Margvelashvili's announcement that the government would provide the country's 650,000 school students with text books free of charge was denounced by publishers as a blow to the publishing business and by political opponents as a populist move in violation of intellectual property rights. In May 2013, Margvelashvili was again in media headlines after he slammed proposed amendments to the labor code, calling them a "nightmare" for businesses.

=== Presidential candidate ===
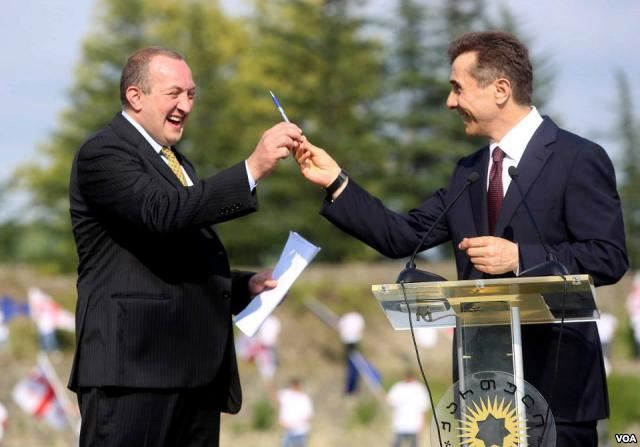
Giorgi Margvelashvili and Bidzina Ivanishvili in 2013

On 11 May 2013, the Georgian Dream coalition named him as its candidate for the October 2013 presidential election. The leader of the coalition, Ivanishvili, claimed the decision was unanimous. The outgoing President of Georgia, Mikheil Saakashvili, expressed skepticism about the nomination, comparing it to Caligula's alleged naming of "his horse to the senate." Both Margvelashvili and Ivanishvili rejected claims by opponents that Margvelashvili was "a puppet" in the hands of a wealthy prime minister. Although not obligated by the law, Margvelashvili resigned from his government office, as he put it, to avoid allegations of misuse of administrative resources during the election campaign. On 18 July 2013, he was succeeded by Tamar Sanikidze as a minister. Margvelashvili campaigned aggressively, with Ivanishvili frequently appearing by his side and expressing support in his public appearances. On 17 October, Margvelashvili announced, following Ivanishvili's advice earlier that day, that he would withdraw from the race in case of a runoff.

On 27 October 2013, Margvelashvili won the presidential election, getting 62% of the vote and beating the United National Movement's David Bakradze by about 40 percentage points. After the election, Margvelashvili stressed that deepening ties with Europe would remain Georgia's priority and the government would work towards defusing tensions with Russia in collaboration with the country's international partners.

=== President ===
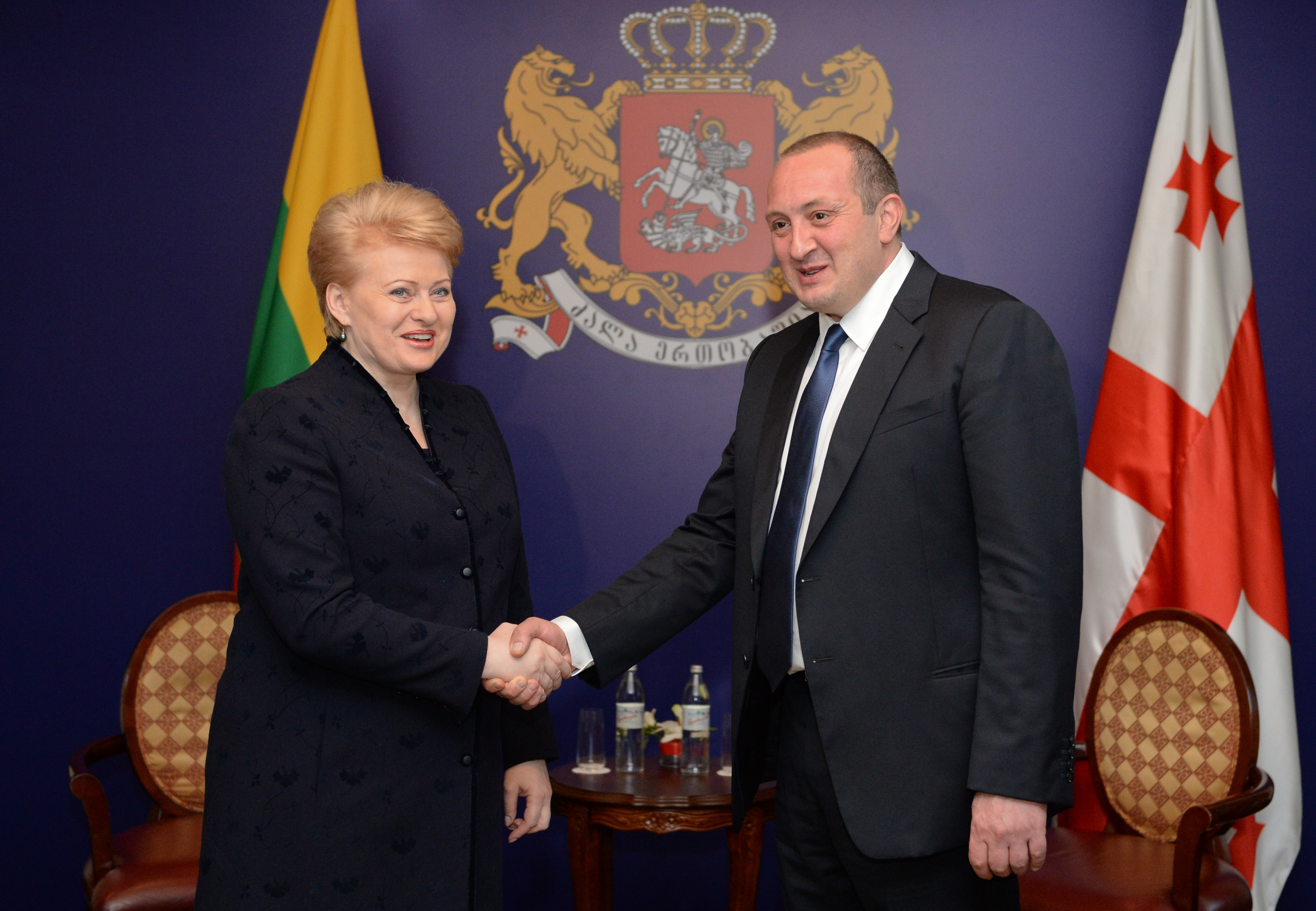
President Giorgi Margvelashvili meeting his Lithuanian counterpart, Dalia Grybauskaitė, in November 2013.

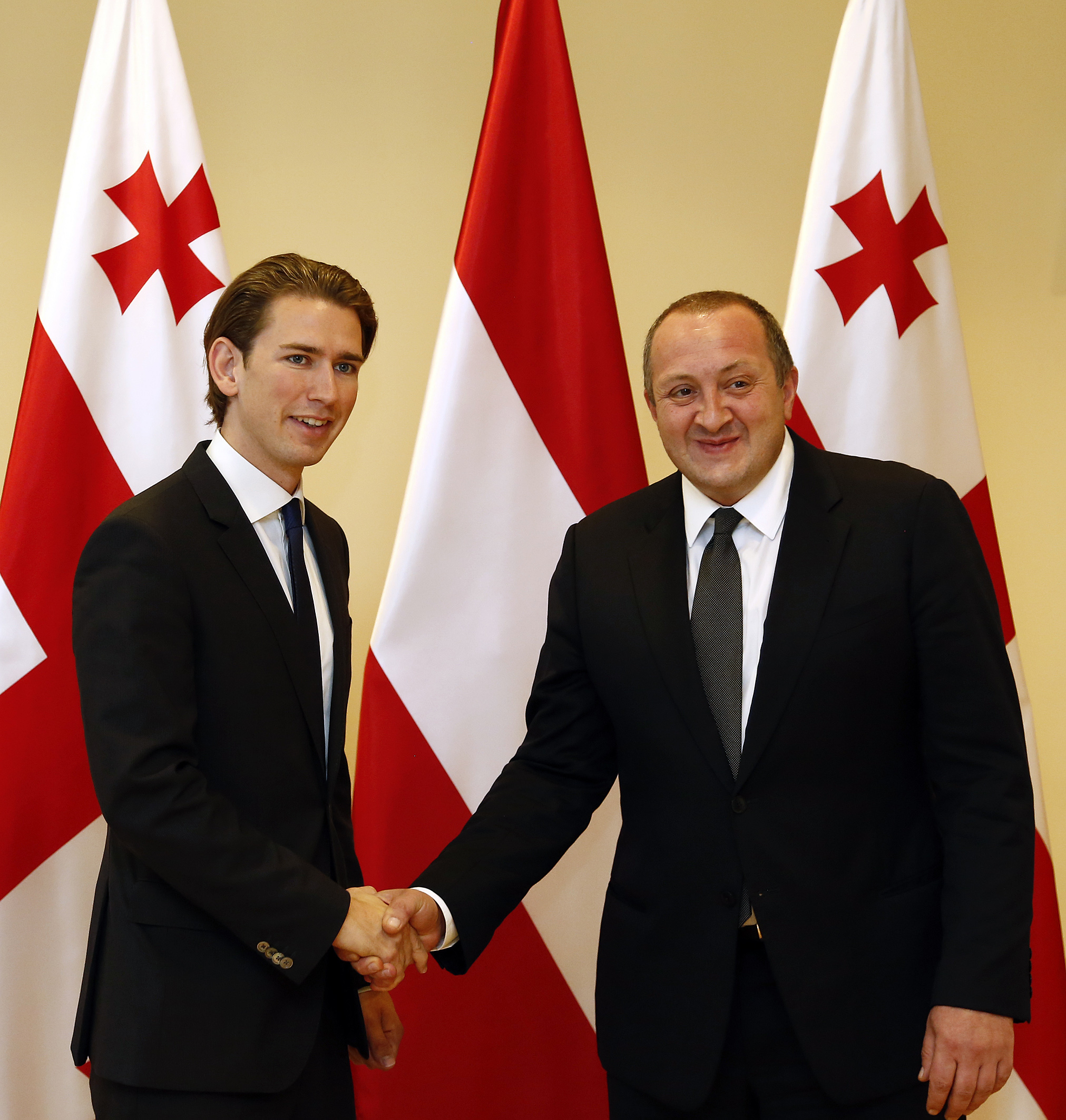
Margvelashvili with Austrian Foreign Minister Sebastian Kurz in Tbilisi, 10 September 2014

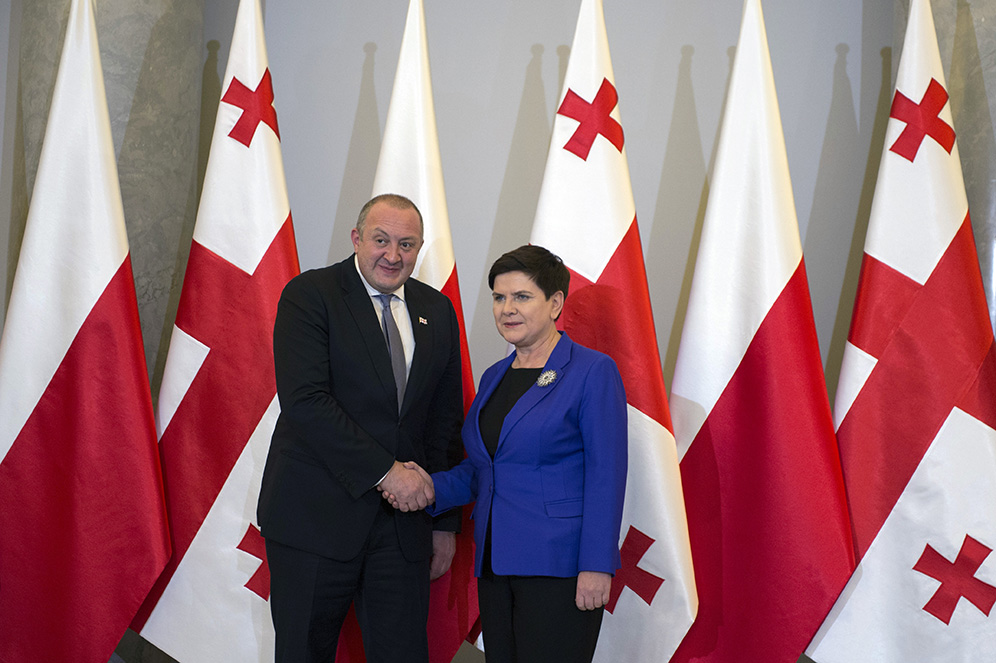
Margvelashvili with Polish Prime Minister Beata Szydło in Warsaw, 8 November 2017

Margvelashvili was sworn in as the fourth President of Georgia at a ceremony in the courtyard of the Parliament's old building in Rustaveli Avenue, Tbilisi, on 17 November 2013. With this, a new constitution came into effect which devolved significant power from the President to the Prime Minister. Margvelashvili's inauguration was not attended by his predecessor Mikheil Saakashvili, who cited disrespect by the new government towards its predecessors and opponents.

Margvelashvili initially refused to move to the luxurious presidential palace built under Saakashvili in Tbilisi, opting for more modest quarters in the building of the State Chancellery until a 19th-century building once occupied by the U.S. embassy in Georgia was refurbished for him. However, he later started to occasionally use the palace for official ceremonies. This was one of the reasons for which Margvelashvili was publicly criticized, in a March 2014 interview with Imedi TV, by the ex-Prime Minister Ivanishvili, who said he was "disappointed" in Margvelashvili.

==== Relations with the ruling party ====
Margvelashvili's relations with Ivanishvili's successor as Prime Minister, Irakli Garibashvili, was tense and difficult. Giorgi Kvirikashvili, who became prime minister in December 2015 following Garibashvili's sudden resignation, sought to establish a congenial relationship with the presidency, but Margvelashvili remained a divisive figure within the ruling party. He was especially critical of the ruling Georgian Dream's position in the ongoing constitutional reform process, which he denounced as a tool to weaken the presidency. The major point at issue was the provision to abolishing direct elections for the post of president. He also accused the GD of refusing to seek a consensus with other political groups over the reforms. Margvelashvili stated that the GD's winning the constitutional majority in the 2016 parliamentary election implied "a threat of concentration of power", but at the same time "opened up opportunities for bold reforms and initiatives". During his tenure, Margvelashvili was critical of what he saw as the Georgian Dream's consolidation of power. When the GD-dominated parliament eventually approved the constitutional amendments in October 2017, Margvelashvili unsuccessfully tried to veto the draft bill, but eventually signed the bill into law, saying it was personally difficult for him to sign the document, but he did so in the interests of stability in the country. Similarly, in January 2018, Margvelashvili vetoed—ultimately unsuccessfully—controversial amendments to the law on Public Broadcaster, concurring with private TV stations and civil society organizations that the law was a threat to Georgia's media pluralism.

In May 2018, Margvelashvili walked out on political debates following his annual state of the nation address, after the Parliament's chairman Irakli Kobakhidze rejected the President's request to allow him to respond to the questions raised by the lawmakers. Margvelashvili clashed again with Kobakhidze and the ruling party, in July 2018, over the local government formation process in autonomous Adjara.

Margvelashvili's term ended in December 2018 as he did not seek re-election in that year's presidential vote. On 3 December 2018, he hosted the President-elect Salome Zourabichvili at his residence and boasted the meeting as the precedent of "the democratic transition of Presidential power" in Georgia's history.

==== Youth engagement ====
During 2016 Georgian parliamentary election Margvelashvili supported an unprecedented project in Georgian history in terms of the scale of coverage, feedbacks, and results – a nationwide campaign initiated by the Europe-Georgia Institute to increase involvement of youth in the elections.

Shortly before the elections the Europe-Georgia Institute started the "Your Voice, Our Future" (YVOF Campaign) in the village of Bazaleti. President Margvelashvil and George Melashvili, the head of the Europe-Georgia Institute addressed participants. Shortly after summer schools on civic engagement, political culture and "Get out the vote" campaigns were held in 10 different regions of Georgia. participants visited 20 cities and towns and held meetings with locals, describing and explaining the importance of voting. Young people planned creative activities such as Flash mobs, plays, theatre sketches and attracted media attention.

The #Initiative Project was created after the YVOF campaign and aimed to create a network of active students to promote active civic life. During the project more than 500 activities were financed in more than 20 regions of Georgia, 5 summer and winter schools were organized to empower the active youth groups all over Georgia. As a result of the project a nationwide youth network of active citizens was created, united under #Initiative network and are coordinating and collaborating on local and national issues.

==== Views on minority rights ====
During his presidency, Margvelashvili was vocal in supporting of minority rights, including LGBTQ+. After a major conservative backlash over a Georgian national football team captain Guram Kashia wearing a pride armband in support of community, Margvelashvili wrote a Facebook post saying: "Everyone has the right for freedom of expression. We should respect human rights and liberties."

=== Post-presidency ===
In January 2019, Margvelashvili returned to the Georgian Institute of Public Affairs (GIPA) to deliver a course of lectures on politics. After retiring from politics, Margvelashvili, together with his family, has mostly lived in the provincial town of Dusheti, where he has started renting out to foreign tourists a cottage near his own house to supplement his income.

In February 2020, the former Mayor of Tbilisi and European Georgia politician, Giorgi Ugulava, was contentiously sentenced for three years imprisonment for embezzlement from the Tbilisi Development Fund. The sentence was decried by Margvelashvili, who described Ugulava as "a political prisoner" and the situation as a "violation of democratic principles in Georgia". On 17 February, he announced that he would return to Georgian politics to oppose the Georgian Dream.

When former Georgian President Mikheil Saakashvili was imprisoned in October 2021 on charges of abuse of power and violence, Margvelashvili has led an effort to free his predecessor from prison. Margvelashvili criticized prison conditions, saying that Saakashvili was being "sentenced to death".

In September 2024, prior to the 2024 Georgian parliamentary election, Margvelashvili joined Strong Georgia coalition.

== Personal life ==
Beyond his native Georgian, Margvelashvili is fluent in English and Russian. Margvelashvili has rarely commented on his private life. He has a daughter from his first marriage, Anna (born 1995), who studied in Moscow. On 10 September 2014, Margvelashvili married at the town of Dusheti his long-time partner Maka Chichua (born 31 March 1971), formerly a makeup artist and occasional singer and actress. The couple has two sons: Teimuraz (born 2 February 2015) and Toma (born 15 January 2018). Maka Chichua also has one daughter from her previous relationship, who is Margvelashvili's stepdaughter. In his free time Margvelashvili enjoys walking, horse-riding and hosting his friend in his country house in Dusheti.

== Notes ==
Political offices
Preceded by Khatia Dekanoidze	Minister of Education and Science; 2012–2013	Succeeded by Tamar Sanikidze
Preceded by Mikheil Saakashvili	President of Georgia; 2013–2018	Succeeded by Salome Zurabishvili
