= Minister of Defence of Georgia =

Head of the Ministry of Defence of Georgia

- საქართველოს თავდაცვის მინისტრი
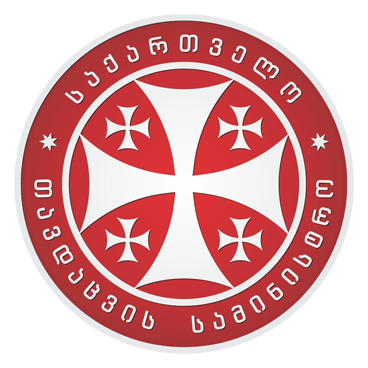
- Seal of the Ministry of Defence of Georgia

- Standard of the Minister

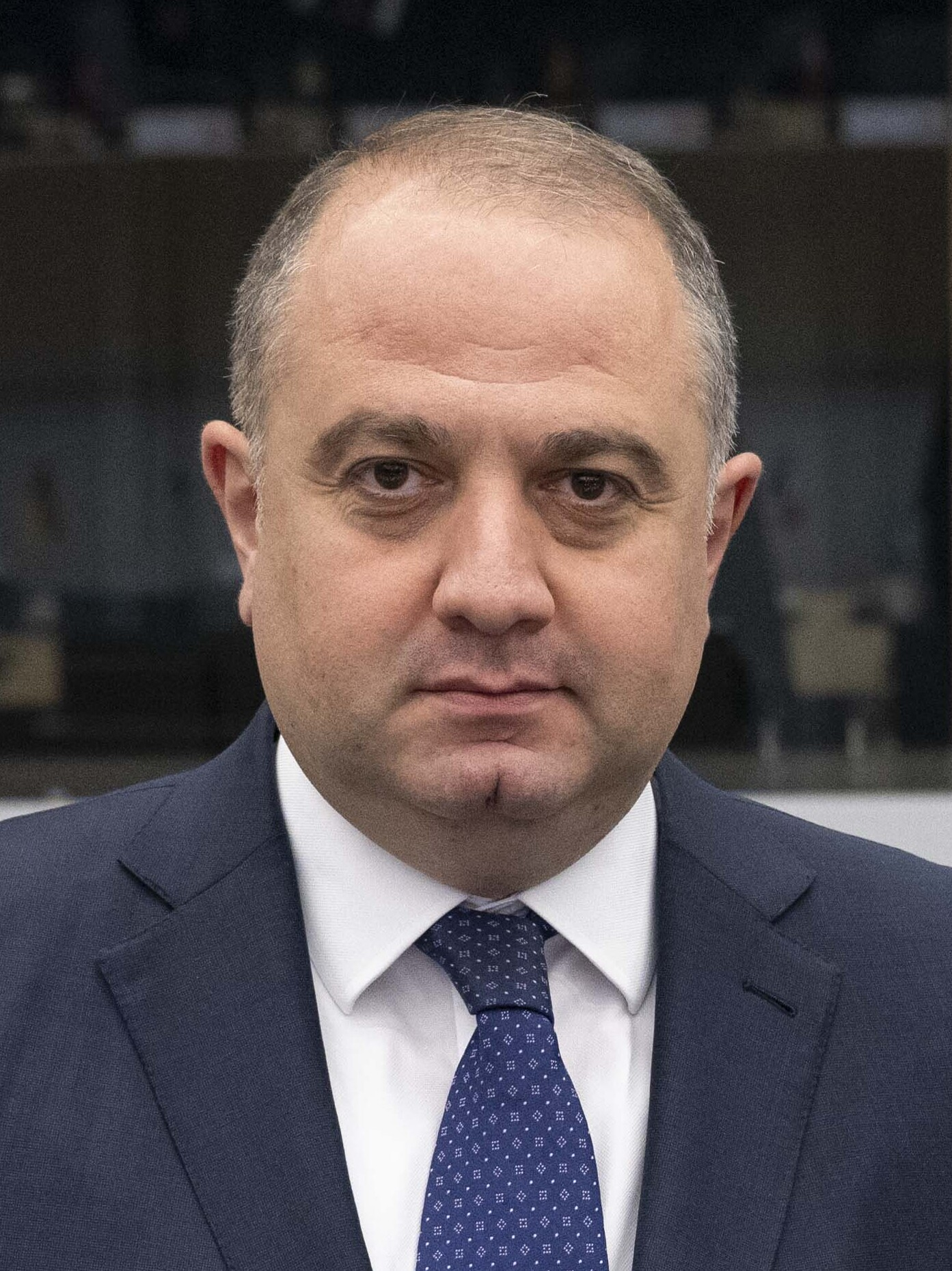
- Incumbent; Irakli Chikovani since February 8, 2024
- Ministry of Defence of Georgia
- Style: Mr. Minister (informal); The Honorable (formal)
- Member of: Cabinet; National Security Council
- Reports to: Prime Minister
- Seat: Tbilisi, Georgia
- Appointer: Prime Minister of Georgia
- Inaugural holder: Grigol Giorgadze (As Minister of War of Democratic Republic of Georgia); Joni Pirtskhalaishvili (As Minister of Defence of Georgia)
- Formation: May 26, 1918; 108 years ago
- Salary: 11,050 GEL per month
- Website: mod.gov.ge

The Minister of Defence of Georgia (Georgian: საქართველოს თავდაცვის მინისტრი) is the head of the Ministry of Defence of Georgia, the governmental body of Georgia in charge of the Defence Forces of Georgia and regulating activities in defence of the country from external threats, preserving territorial integrity and waging wars on behalf of Georgia.

The current minister is Irakli Chikovani, who was appointed on February 8, 2024.

== List of ministers ==
=== Ministers of War of the Democratic Republic of Georgia (1918–1921) ===
- Grigol Giorgadze, May 26, 1918 – February 13, 1919
- Noe Ramishvili, February 14, 1919 – December 1919
- Grigol Lordkipanidze, January 1920 – September 23, 1920
- Ilia Odishelidze, (acting), September 23, 1920 – November 10, 1920
- Parmen Chichinadze, November 10, 1920 – February 25, 1921

=== People's Commissar for Military and Naval Affairs of the Georgian SSR (1921–1923) ===
- Shalva Eliava, September 15, 1921 – November 14, 1923

=== Ministers of Defense of the Republic of Georgia (From 1991) ===
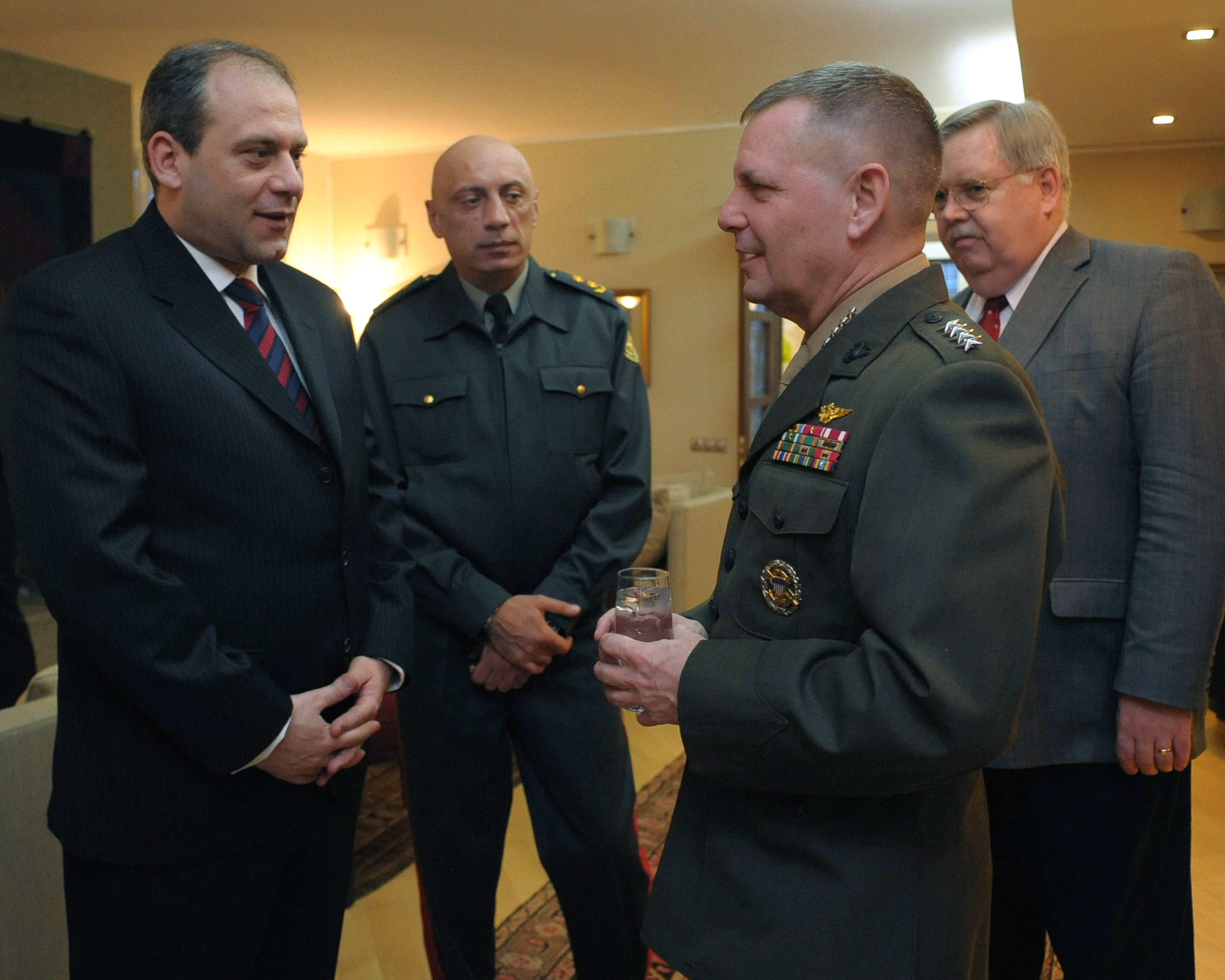
Former Minister Sikharulidze with U.S. Vice Chairman of the Joint Chiefs of Staff James Cartwright (right) in 2009

- Joni Pirtskhalaishvili, September 15, 1991 – January 2, 1992
- Levan Sharashenidze, January 2, 1992 – May 8, 1992
- Tengiz Kitovani, May 8, 1992 – May 5, 1993
- Giorgi Karkarashvili, May 6, 1993 – February 11, 1994
- Eduard Shevardnadze (acting), February 11, 1994 – April 25, 1994
- Varden Nadibaidze, April 25, 1994 – April 27, 1998
- David Tevzadze, April 28, 1998 – February 17, 2004

=== Ministers of Defense of Georgia (From 2004) ===
- Gela Bezhuashvili, February 17, 2004 – June 10, 2004
- Giorgi Baramidze, June 10, 2004 – December 17, 2004
- Irakli Okruashvili, December 17, 2004 – November 10, 2006
- David Kezerashvili, November 10, 2006 – December 9, 2008
- Vasil Sikharulidze, December 9, 2008 – August 27, 2009
- Bachana Akhalaia, August 27, 2009 – July 4, 2012
- Dimitri Shashkin, July 4, 2012 – October 25, 2012
- Irakli Alasania, October 25, 2012 – November 4, 2014
- Mindia Janelidze, November 4, 2014 – May 1, 2015
- Tinatin Khidasheli, May 1, 2015 – August 1, 2016
- Levan Izoria, August 1, 2016 – September 8, 2019
- Irakli Garibashvili – September 8, 2019 – February 22, 2021
- Juansher Burchuladze – February 22, 2021 – February 8, 2024
- Irakli Chikovani - February 8, 2024 - Present
