= 2009 Georgian mutiny =

Army mutiny in Georgia

Coordinates: 41.781217°N 45.150526°E

2009 Georgian Mutiny
Date	5 May 2009
Location	(Georgia (country)) Georgia
Status	Mutineers surrender

Belligerents
Georgian Army; Georgian Police	Mutineers from the Mukhrovani Separate Tank Battalion

Commanders and leaders
President Mikheil Saakashvili; Interior Minister Vano Merabishvili; Defense Minister Vasil Sikharulidze	Lt. Colonel Mamuka Gorgiashvili

Strength
(?)	~500(?)

The 2009 Georgian mutiny was a mutiny by a Georgian Army tank battalion based in Mukhrovani, 30 kilometres (19 mi) east of the capital Tbilisi on 5 May 2009. It is not yet known how many soldiers took part. Later that day, the Georgian Ministry of Interior announced that the mutineers had surrendered. Some of its leaders, including the battalion's commander, were arrested; others managed to escape. The mutiny broke out after the government announced that it had uncovered what it claimed was a Russian-backed plot to destabilize Georgia and assassinate President Mikheil Saakashvili. Later, Georgian authorities retracted their accusations of an assassination plot and allegations of Russian support.

== Background ==
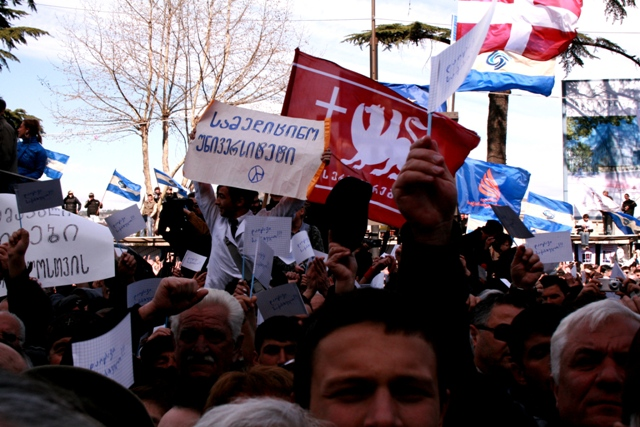
April 10, 2009. Demonstrators in front of the Georgian parliament building, demanding that Saakashvili resign.

Georgia has been affected by unrest since the 2008 South Ossetia war.

Since April 2009, protests have called for the resignation of the Georgian president Mikheil Saakashvili. In March, nine members of the political party Democratic Movement – United Georgia were arrested after allegedly purchasing automatic weapons ahead of more anti-government demonstrations, a claim described by its leader as "absurd". Several senior government figures recently defected to the opposition, claiming Saakashvili started an unwinnable war that left the breakaway regions of South Ossetia and Abkhazia further in Russian control. In May 2009, Russia decided to take control of South Ossetia's border with Georgia.

The mutiny took place a day before the planned NATO exercises in Georgia. NATO drills were condemned by Russia, which referred to them as an "attempt to cheer up the Saakashvili regime".

== The mutiny ==
The mutiny erupted on the morning of 5 May, after a Georgian Army tank battalion stationed in Mukhrovani, 30 kilometres (19 mi) from the Georgian capital of Tbilisi, began to disobey orders.

According to the mutineers statement, circulated by local media, they were not planning any military action, and urging for dialogue between the government and the opposition during ongoing political crisis. Colonel Mamuka Gorgishvili, commander of the Mukhrovani Tank Battalion, stated: "Watching the country being torn apart by the current standoff is unbearable. There is a possibility of this standoff turning violent". Police then barred reporters from approaching the base.

According to the Minister of Defense, Vasil Sikharulidze, the plotters' minimum goal was to undermine the NATO military exercises beginning in May 2009. Sikharulidze also mentioned to the Rustavi 2 television that the rebellion was also "an attempt of a military coup." In response to the mutiny, the Georgian Army deployed troops, military police, helicopters, and 30 tanks and armored vehicles, alongside Georgian Police units, some equipped with armored vehicles, to the base. In a televised address, the President of Georgia said the mutineers had been given a deadline to surrender. Although not specifying when the deadline would expire, he did say that an order "to act appropriately" has been given out to the law enforcement agencies if the negotiations would fail. President Saakashvili also suggested that the mutiny was part of a wider Russian-orchestrated plan to disrupt the upcoming NATO military exercises "Cooperative Longbow - Cooperative Lancer 09" in Georgia, scheduled to start on 6 May and Georgia’s joining with EU's Eastern Partnership. The soldiers at Mukhrovani quickly surrendered after Saakashvili entered the base accompanied by heavily armed bodyguards to negotiate with the mutineers.

21 of the mutiny plotters were put to trial. The trial concluded on 11 January 2010. Colonel Koba Otanadze was given 29 years in prison, while Rangers' Battalion Commander Levan Amiridze was given 28 years, and Tank Battalion Commander Shota Gorgiashvili was given 19 years. All three had been charged with attempting to overthrow the government. National Guard Commander Koba Kobaladze was sentenced to eight months and six days imprisonment for the illegal purchase and possession of weapons. The remaining defendants were tried for various crimes including disobedience and illegal weapons possession, and given sentences ranging from three to fifteen years of imprisonment.

=== Military coup attempt suspicion ===
The Georgian Interior Ministry has expressed concerns about a large scale military mutiny that was to be planned in the Georgian Army by some former military officials, who were in coordination with Russia. Shota Utiashvili, head of the information and analytical department of the Georgian Interior Ministry, said that the mutiny seems to be coordinated with Russia and aimed at minimum thwarting NATO military exercises and maximum organizing full-scale military mutiny in the country. Later, Georgian authorities retracted accusations of Russian support.

== Aftermath ==
On May 5, 2009, the Interior Ministry of Georgia released video footage, recorded apparently with a body-worn covert camera and showing a man, purportedly the retired major Gia Gvaladze, talking to several persons whose faces were blurred in tape and naming several former senior military and security officials, including David Tevzadze, Jemal Gakhokidze, Koba Kobaladze, and Gia Karkarashvili as supporters of the planned mutiny. Kobaladze, Gvaladze, and the Mukhrovani battalion commander Lieutenant Colonel Mamuka Gorgiashvili, as well as dozens of military personnel and civilians were arrested by the police "in connection with the Mukhrovani incident". Kharkharashvili and Tevzadze have rejected any links with the plot. Two other former army officers, Koba Otanadze and Zaza Mushkudiani, are wanted.

Later that day Gia Karkarashvili released video footage showing him talking with Koba Melikidze who allegedly was trying to persuade him to take part in the mutiny. The Georgian Ministry of Internal Affairs expressed its gratitude to Karkarashvili for information provided by him as it helped to arrest Melikidze and prevent an assassination attempt on Vano Merabishvili.

On May, 6, Georgian authorities stepped back from accusations of an assassination plot against Mikheil Saakashvili and allegations of Russian support of the mutiny. At this stage, Georgian authorities claimed the army mutiny was mainly aimed at disrupting NATO exercises starting on May 6, 2009. Saakashvili's official site states the mutiny was inspired by a group of disgruntled Georgian army officers.

The principal suspects – Gia Krialashvili, Koba Otanadze, and Levan Amiridze – remained at large after the Mukhrovani incident. On May 20, 2009, Krialashvili was killed, and Otanadze and Amiridze were wounded and delivered to hospital in a shootout with police at the outskirts of Tbilisi.

=== Domestic reactions ===
- Politicians
  - The Georgian opposition has expressed its doubts on the mutiny backgrounds and actual happening. One of the opposition leaders, David Gamkrelidze claimed that the event could have been an inside job of the Georgian authorities to draw the attention away from the anti-government protests in Georgia. Irakli Alasania, leader of the opposition Alliance for Georgia, said he would not make any political assessment, because of lack of information.
  - In May 2009, Givi Targamadze, senior member of the Parliament of Georgia for the ruling United National Movement party accused Alexander Ebralidze, a Russian tycoon of Georgian origin, of being behind the 2009 Georgian attempted mutiny with the aim of “at least to trigger unrest in Georgia” or “at maximum to pave the way for entry of the Russian occupation forces in Tbilisi.”
- Military experts – The rebellion could be linked with plans to use troops to end opposition roadblocks paralysing Tbilisi, with some officers refusing to participate. This version "chimes with" military sources information, a senior Western diplomat confirmed.

=== Foreign reactions ===
- Russia – The Russian Ministry of Foreign Affairs denied any Russian involvement after the Georgian accusations of interfering in Georgian domestic affairs. The Russian Federation's envoy to NATO, Dmitry Rogozin, said that Moscow had been accustomed to ridiculous accusations from Georgia.
- United States – The United States Department of Defense has announced that the situation in Georgia which took place earlier on May 5 is probably an isolated incident. The press secretary of the Pentagon Bryan Whitman added that the United States is still analyzing the situation. He also stated he did not have any information on Russian involvement in the mutiny.

== See also ==
- 1998 Georgian attempted mutiny
