= Levan Sharashenidze =

Soviet-Georgian military officer and politician (1931–2012)

- Born: 24 March 1931; Tbilisi, Transcaucasian SFSR, Soviet Union
- Died: 2012 (aged 81)
- Military career
- Allegiance: Soviet Union (Georgia (country)) Georgia
- Branch: Soviet Airborne Forces (Georgia (country)) Georgian Land Forces
- Rank: Lieutenant General
- Commands: Politburo of Soviet Guard Airborne Divisions; Georgian Armed Forces
- Conflicts: Georgian Civil War; Georgian–Abkhazian conflict; Georgian–Ossetian conflict

Levan Sharashenidze (Georgian: ლევან შარაშენიძე; Russian: Леван Леванович Шарашенидзе, Levan Levanovich Sharashenidze) (24 March 1931 – 2012) was a Soviet and Georgian military officer and Defense Minister of Georgia (1992).

== Education and career ==
Born in Tbilisi, Sharashenidze was trained at the Alma-Ata Airborne Service School. He also studied law at the Vilnius University and was further educated at the Lenin Military-Political Academy in Moscow. In 1953, he joined the Soviet military, going through the ranks from a paratrooper platoon commander to deputy chief of political directorate of the Transcaucasian Military District (1976-1979) and military commissar of the Georgian Soviet Socialist Republic (1979-1992). In 1989 he was promoted to the rank of lieutenant-general of the Soviet army.

== Service in independent Georgia ==
Sharashenidze retained his post of the country's military commissar after Georgia declared independence from the Soviet Union in April 1991. He was involved in a military coup against Georgia's first elected president Zviad Gamsakhurdia (December 1991–January 1992). In the course of the coup, the rebel Military Council appointed Sharashenidze Georgia's defense minister on January 3, 1992. On May 8, 1992, Eduard Shevardnadze, Georgia's new head of state, dismissed Sharashenidze as the minister, replacing him with Georgia National Guard chief Tengiz Kitovani. Sharashenidze was, instead, made a chief adviser to the Ministry of Defense of Georgia. In his capacity, he was present at the Georgian headquarters and was involved in the diplomatic efforts with Russia during the war with separatists in Abkhazia (1992–1993). He has described himself as being of a "pro-Russian" orientation. After 1995, Sharashenidze has had no noticeable political and military role in Georgia.

== Death ==
Sharashenidze in 2012, at the age of 81.

| Preceded by Joni Pirtskhalaishvili | Minister of Defense of Georgia; 3 January 1992 — 8 May 1992 | Succeeded by Tengiz Kitovani |
