= Joni Pirtskhalaishvili =

Soviet and Georgian general

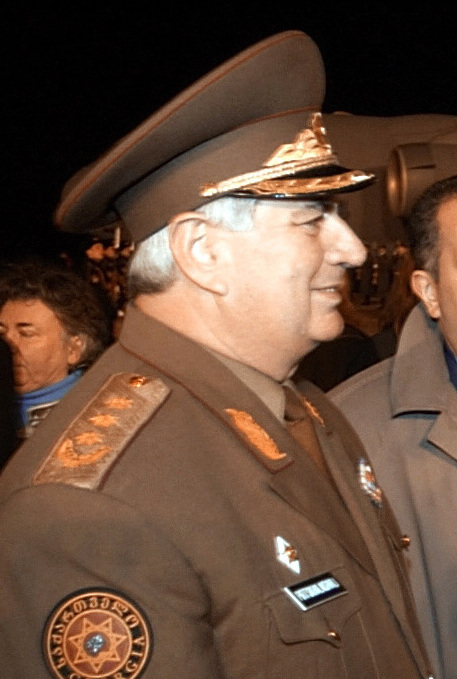
- General Joni Pirtskhalaishvili (2002)
- Born: May 22, 1947 (age 79); Lanchkhuti, Guria, Georgian SSR, USSR
- Military career
- Allegiance: Soviet Union; Georgia
- Branch: Soviet Army; Georgian Armed Forces
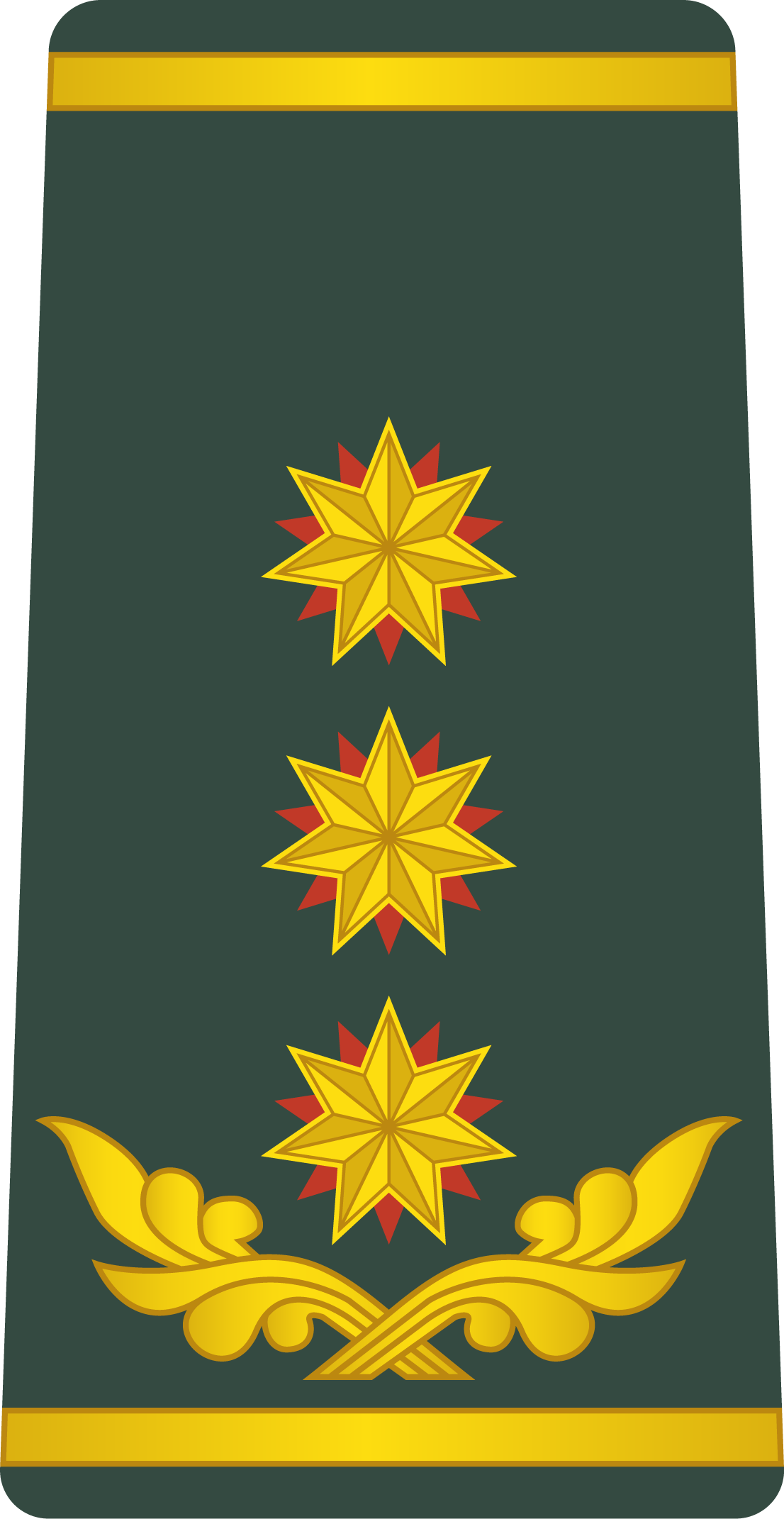
- Rank: Lieutenant General
- Commands: Soviet motor-rifle division Georgian Armed Forces
- Conflicts: War in Abkhazia

Joni Pirtskhalaishvili (Georgian: ჯონი ფირცხალაიშვილი; born 22 May 1947) is a retired Georgian lieutenant general (1999). He was the country's Minister of Defense from 15 September 1991 to 2 January 1992 and the Chief of General Staff of Georgian Armed Forces from May 1998 to September 2003.

== Biography ==
Born in Lanchkhuti and a graduate of the Frunze Military Academy in Moscow, Pirtskhalaishvili commanded a Soviet motor-rifle division in Ukraine before returning to Georgia. He briefly served as the country's Defense Minister in the government of President Zviad Gamsakhurdia from September 1991 to January 1992, when Gamsakhurdia was declared deposed in a military coup. During the rule of Eduard Shevardnadze, Pirtskhalaishvili became Deputy Defense Minister under Vardiko Nadibaidze, but ultimately resigned because of differences with Nadibaidze over military reforms.

After the dismissal of Nadibaidze in 1998, Major-General Pirtskhalaishvili was appointed Chief of the General Staff and promoted to the rank of lieutenant general. During his tenure, the United States launched the GTEP training program for the Georgian troops and Georgia deployed its contingent in Iraq.

During the disputed parliamentary election in November 2003, eventually annulled by the Rose Revolution later that month, Pirtskhalaishvili ran, unsuccessfully, in the Lanchkhuti constituency on a ticket of pro-Shevardnadze election bloc For New Georgia.

Military offices
Preceded by Zurab Meparishvili	Chief of General Staff of the Georgian Armed Forces; 1998–2003	Succeeded by Givi Iukuridze
Preceded by Office created	Minister of Defense of Georgia; 1991–1992	Succeeded by Levan Sharashenidze
