= Cadets Military Lyceum of Georgia =

Military training school in Kutaisi, Georgia

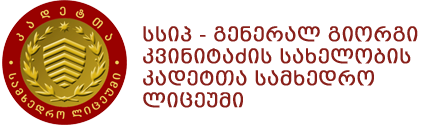
The Cadets Military Lyceum logo

The Giorgi Kvinitadze Cadet Military Lyceum (Georgian: კადეტთა სამხედრო ლიცეუმი, romanized: k'adet'ta samkhedro litseumi) is a specialized state school, responsible for the training of young students in military science and preparing them for professional military service in the Defense Forces of Georgia. It falls under the command of the Ministry of Defense of Georgia. The lyceum is located in the suburbs of Kutaisi, Georgia.

== General information ==
It was opened in Kutaisi in 2010 by order of Defence Minister Bacho Akhalaia. It is the country's higher secondary military educational institution. It offers three years of training that takes up the 10th, 11th and 12th Grades. It accepts cadets with a Grade 9 school completion certificate. Many cadets chose to continue their education at the National Defense Academy. In March 2016, Deputy Minister of Defence Anna Dolidze announced that from September of that year, girls will be accepted into the lyceum. Upon their entry into the lyceum, President Giorgi Margvelashvili the students on the first day of the 2016-17 school year. The Government of Georgia generally spends about 10,000 lari (4,300 thousand dollars) on the training of pupils.

== Student life ==
=== Studies ===
All curriculum falls in line with those outlined with the Ministry of Education, Science, Culture and Sport of Georgia. In parallel with the general educational program, additional military disciplines such as tactical, engineer, first medical aid, humanitarian law and military history are taught. There are 7 departments in each curriculum in the Cadets Military Lyceum. Among the foreign languages cadets study are English, Turkish and Russian.

=== Others ===
It is a boarding school that provides cadets with nutrition, medical service and textbooks. Upon graduation the students will be awarded with certificates of secondary education. The lyceum has a self-governance body that consists of various committees, including the lyceum administration and the committee of public affairs. During the academic year, cadet Olympiads and creative educational conferences also take place.

== See also ==
- Jamshid Nakhchivanski Military Lyceum
- Minsk Suvorov Military School
- Ivan Bohun Military High School
