= Vasil Sikharulidze =

Georgian politician

Vasil Sikharulidze ვასილ სიხარულიძე
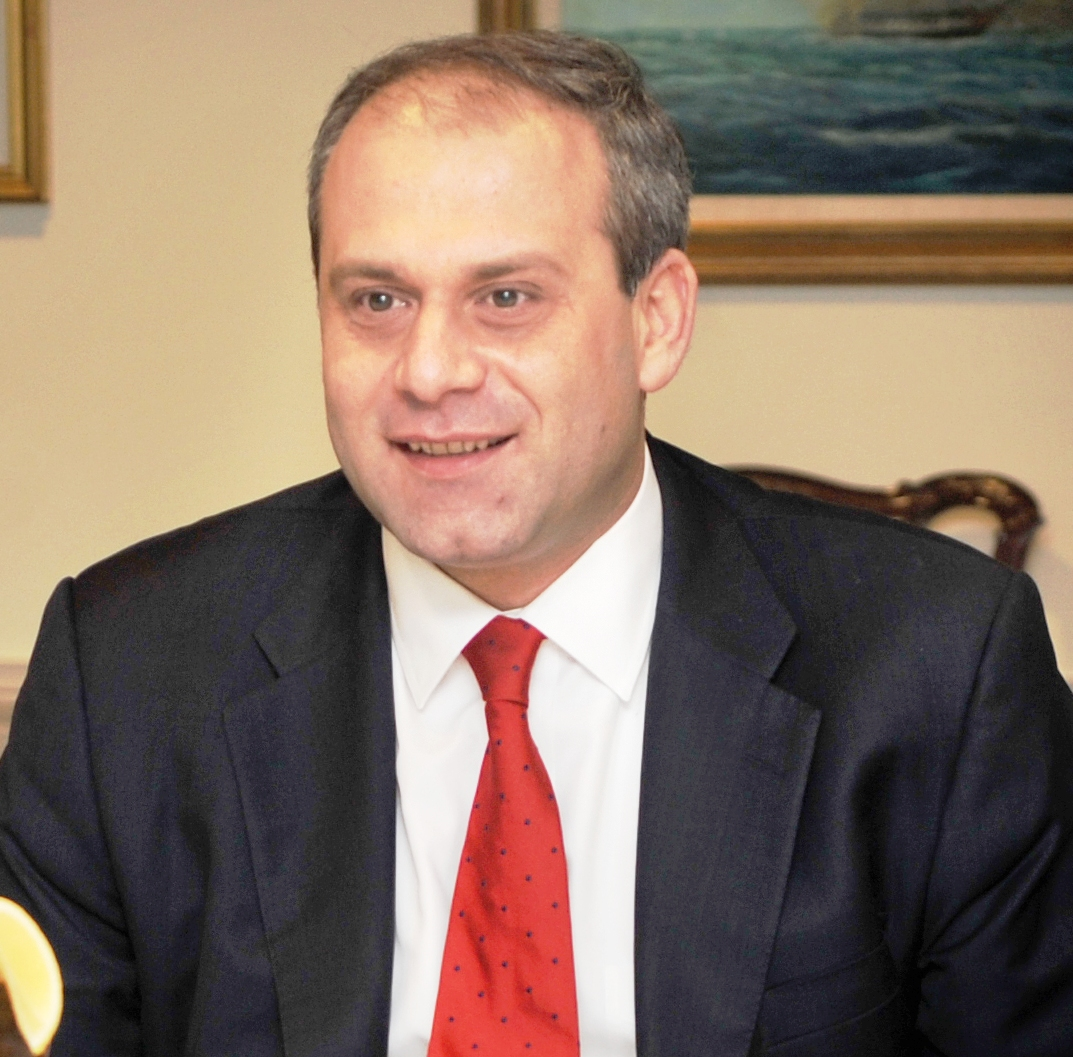

Minister of Defense of Georgia
- In office December 9, 2008 – August 27, 2009
- Preceded by: Davit Kezerashvili
- Succeeded by: Bacho Akhalaia

Personal details
- Born: May 30, 1968 (age 58) Tbilisi, Georgian SSR, USSR

Vasil Sikharulidze (Georgian: ვასილ სიხარულიძე) (born May 30, 1968) is a Georgian diplomat and politician. He worked as a foreign affairs advisor to the President of Georgia Mikhail Saakashvili from August 27, 2009. He had previously served as Ambassador to the United States (2006-2008) and Georgia's Minister of Defence (2008-2009).

== Early life and education ==
Born in Tbilisi, then-Soviet Georgia, Sikharulidze graduated from Tbilisi State Medical University in 1993 and practiced psychiatry from 1993 to 1995.

== Career ==
After a brief tenure as an Executive Director of the Atlantic Council of Georgia, an umbrella organization that brings together Georgian NGOs working on Euro-Atlantic integration issues, Sikharulidze worked for the Parliament of Georgia as a leading specialist on defense and security issues from 1996 to 2000.

He headed the NATO division at the Ministry of Foreign Affairs of Georgia from 2000 to 2002 and served as a deputy head of the Georgian Mission of NATO in Brussels. He worked for the National Security Council of Georgia in 2004 and served as a Deputy Minister of Defense in the years 2005-2006. He later earned a MPA from Harvard Kennedy School.

In March 2006, Sikharulidze was appointed the Ambassador Extraordinary and Plenipotentiary of Georgia to the United States, Canada and Mexico. He was recalled in December 2008 to replace, as the Minister of Defense of Georgia, Davit Kezerashvili, whose conduct during the August 2008 war with Russia had been criticized by the opposition. Sikharulidze held the post for eight months, overseeing the rebuilding of Georgia's shattered military after the war. On August 27, 2009, he was replaced with deputy Bacho Akhalaia, a close ally of President Mikheil Saakashvili and influential Interior Minister Vano Merabishvili, a decision subjected by the opposition to criticism. Sikharulidze was moved to the post of President's foreign policy advisor.

He currently serves as the Chairman of the Atlantic Council of Georgia in Tbilisi, Georgia.

Political offices
Preceded by Davit Kezerashvili	Minister of Defense of Georgia; 9 December 2008 – 27 August 2009	Succeeded by Bacho Akhalaia
