= Khatuna Kalmakhelidze =

Georgian politician (born 1979)

Khatuna Kalmakhelidze ხათუნა კალმახელიძე
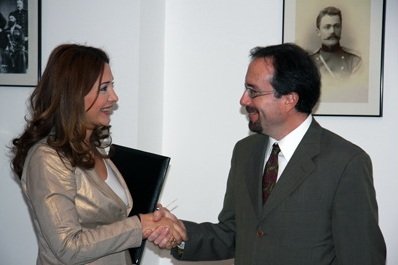
- Kalmakhelidze (left) meeting US Ambassador to Georgia John R. Bass

Minister of Corrections and Legal Assistance
- In office December 21, 2009 – September 19, 2012
- President: Mikheil Saakashvili
- Preceded by: Dimitri Shashkin
- Succeeded by: Giorgi Tughushi

Personal details
- Born: February 11, 1979 (age 47) Tbilisi, Georgia SSR, Soviet Union

Khatuna Kalmakhelidze (Georgian: ხათუნა კალმახელიძე; born February 11, 1979) is a Georgian politician who served as the Minister of Corrections and Legal Assistance from December 2009 to September 2012.

== Early years ==
Kalmakhelidze was born on February 11, 1979, in Tbilisi, Georgia. She graduated from Hunter College with a Bachelor of Arts in Political Science cum laude and minored in Economics. From 2005 until 2007, she studied at Elliott School of International Affairs in George Washington University, obtaining her Master's in International Affairs and International Security. While in the United States, Kalmakhelidze also worked at the Georgian Mission to the United Nations. In 2006, she worked at Political Finance Research Unit of International Foundation for Election Systems (IFES).

== Political career ==
After returning to Georgia, Kalmakhelidze was hired as the Deputy Political Director at the Ministry of Foreign Affairs of Georgia. On December 21, 2009, she was appointed Minister of Corrections and Legal Assistance. After taking office, Kalmakhelidze instituted reforms in the penitentiary system of the country, bringing 80% of the state prisons in line with European standards.

Kalmakhelidze filed resignation on September 19, 2012, amid a public outrage after a video footage of inmates being beaten and sodomized in a Tbilisi prison emerged a day earlier.

Kalmakhelidze speaks English, German, French and Russian.
