= Alexander Yebralidze =

Russian businessman (born 1955)

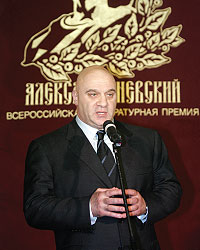
- Alexander Yebralidze in 2011
- Born: June 20, 1955 (age 70); Batumi, Georgia
- Occupation: Businessman

Alexander Yebralidze (Georgian: ალექსანდრე ებრალიძე, alek’sandre ebralidze; Russian: Александр Иосифович Ебралидзе, Aleksandr Iosifovich Yebralidze) (born June 20, 1955) is a Russian tycoon of Georgian origin. He is the Director General of the Center for Humanitarian and Business Cooperation OJSC and runs several businesses in St. Petersburg. He advanced an ambition to become President of Georgia in May 2009, triggering controversy in the Georgian political circles.

== Businessman career ==
Born in Batumi, then-Soviet Georgia, Ebralidze has lived in Leningrad (now St. Petersburg, Russia) since age 15. He graduated from the State Russian Herzen Pedagogical University. Yebralidze started out as a businessman in 1989. He was jailed twice around the same time: first for a robbery, and then for hooliganism and resistance to the police. Ebralidze then forged close relations with the Russian authorities and made his fortune as a trader and property developer in the early 1990s.

As of 2009, he is the director general and co-owner of the Taleon group, owning a fashionable club and luxury hotel housed in historical mansions in St. Petersburg, as well as the owner of several elite shops and markets.

== Political activities ==
In May 2009, Ebralidze attended the "assembly of peoples of Georgia" in Sochi, Russia, organized by the critics of Georgian government. He announced having ambition to become a president of Georgia, triggering protest from several delegates from Tbilisi who walked out of the meeting hall after Ebralidze's announcement. Ebralidze said he had been waiting for twenty years and now he was "giving up his modesty". He said he was a supporter of Georgia's "neutrality" and close ties with Russia. He added that Georgia’s territorial integrity and friendly relations with Russia were his major goals.

Givi Targamadze, senior member of the Parliament of Georgia for the ruling United National Movement party accused Ebralidze of being behind the 2009 Georgian attempted mutiny with the aim of “at least to trigger unrest in Georgia” or “at maximum to pave the way for entry of the Russian occupation forces in Tbilisi.” Ebralidze dispatched his attorney lawyer in Tbilisi to formally request the Georgian chief prosecutor’s office to probe into the allegations. He said he would seek for public apology from Targamadze.

Ebralidze had set the 2013 presidential elections, after President Mikheil Saakashvili’s second and final term in office expired, as his target. It remained unclear how Ebralidze would run for presidency, as he had not lived in Georgia for last 40 years and has no Georgian citizenship. He has avoided answering questions about the issue.
