= Eka Zguladze =

Georgian politician

Ekaterine Zguladze
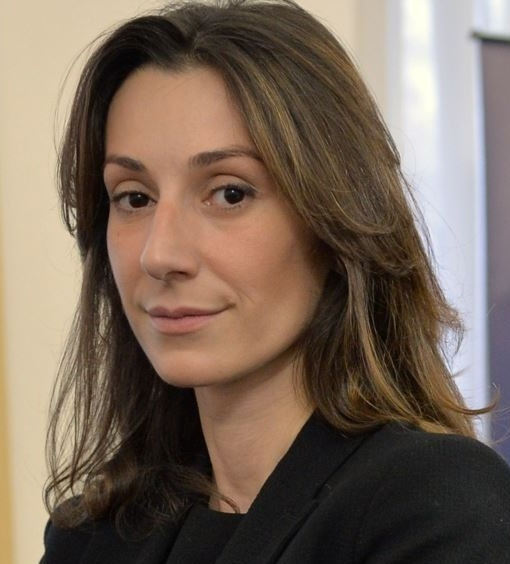

First Deputy Minister of Internal Affairs of Ukraine
- In office 17 December 2014 – 11 May 2016
- Prime Minister: Arseniy Yatseniuk; Volodymyr Groysman
- Preceded by: Volodymyr Evdokimov
- Succeeded by: Arsen Avakov

Acting Minister of Internal Affairs of Georgia
- In office 20 September 2012 – 25 October 2012
- Prime Minister: Vano Merabishvili
- Preceded by: Bacho Akhalaia
- Succeeded by: Irakli Garibashvili

Deputy Minister of Internal Affairs of Georgia
- In office 2005 – 25 October 2012
- Prime Minister: Zurab Nogaideli; Giorgi Baramidze (acting); Lado Gurgenidze; Grigol Mgaloblishvili; Nika Gilauri; Vano Merabishvili
- Minister: Vano Merabishvili; Bacho Akhalaia; Herself (acting)

Personal details
- Born: 18 June 1978 (age 48) Tbilisi, Georgian SSR, Soviet Union
- Citizenship: Soviet (1978–1991); Georgian (1991–2014; 2016–present); Ukrainian (2014–2016)
- Spouse: Raphaël Glucksmann (m. 2009; div. 2014)
- Children: 1
- Education: Tbilisi State University

Ekaterine "Eka" Zguladze (Ekaterina Zguladze-Glucksmann; Georgian: ეკატერინე ზღულაძე, Ukrainian: Екатеріна Згуладзе-Глуксманн; born 18 June 1978) is a Georgian and Ukrainian government official. She served as First Deputy Minister of Internal Affairs of Ukraine from 17 December 2014 until 11 May 2016. She had also served as Georgia's First Deputy Minister of Internal Affairs from 2006 to 2012 and Acting Minister of Internal Affairs in 2012.

== Early life and education ==
Ekaterine Zguladze was born in Tbilisi, the capital of then-Soviet Georgia. She studied law at Oklahoma State University and eventually graduated from the Tbilisi State University with a degree in international journalism.

== Career ==
=== In Georgia ===
Zguladze worked for several international organizations based in Tbilisi and, from 2004 to 2005, the United States foreign aid agency Millennium Challenge Corporation – Georgia. At the invitation of the then-Minister of Internal Affairs of Georgia, Ivane Merabishvili, Zguladze, then 27 years old, became First Deputy Minister of Internal Affairs in the administration of President Mikheil Saakashvili in May 2006. After Merabishvili's successor, Bachana Akhalaia, resigned in response to an inmate abuse scandal in Tbilisi's Gldani prison on 19 September 2012, Zguladze was appointed Acting Minister of Internal Affairs and served on this position until the opposition Georgian Dream coalition, victorious in the October parliamentary election, formed a new government on 25 October 2012.

During her tenures in the ministry, Zguladze helped carry out sweeping police reforms that earned praise in the West. She was also the ministry's spokesperson on a range of issues, including during negotiations with foreign diplomats, and briefed the media during the tense days of the August 2008 war with Russia.

=== In Ukraine ===
On 17 December 2014, Zguladze was appointed as First Deputy Minister of Internal Affairs of Ukraine. Earlier that month, the President of Ukraine Petro Poroshenko granted her Ukrainian citizenship to make her eligible for the post. She is the second former Georgian official, after Alexander Kvitashvili, appointed to a Ukrainian government position in 2014. On her plans for police reform, she stated, "We're not producing cosmetic changes; we need to create a brand new system of law enforcement." On 5 July 2015, 2,000 new patrol police replaced Kyiv's old traffic police, completely overhauled with new western-inspired uniforms. In September 2015, Zguladze said, "I'm a firm believer that Western values, Western democracy, and Western aspirations are the way for Georgia … and for Ukraine."

On 11 May 2016, Zguladze resigned as First Deputy Minister to lead an ad hoc group of advisers to the interior minister. Following this she gave up Ukrainian citizenship and became a citizen of Georgia again.

== Personal life ==
In addition to her native Georgian, Zguladze is fluent in Russian and English. Her second husband, whom she married in 2011, is the French journalist, film director and political figure Raphaël Glucksmann (born 1979), who is the son of the French philosopher and writer André Glucksmann and a former adviser to ex-President Saakashvili. The couple has a son born in 2011. They subsequently divorced.
