= Davit Kezerashvili =

Georgian investor, entrepreneur, and statesman

Davit Kezerashvili დავით კეზერაშვილი
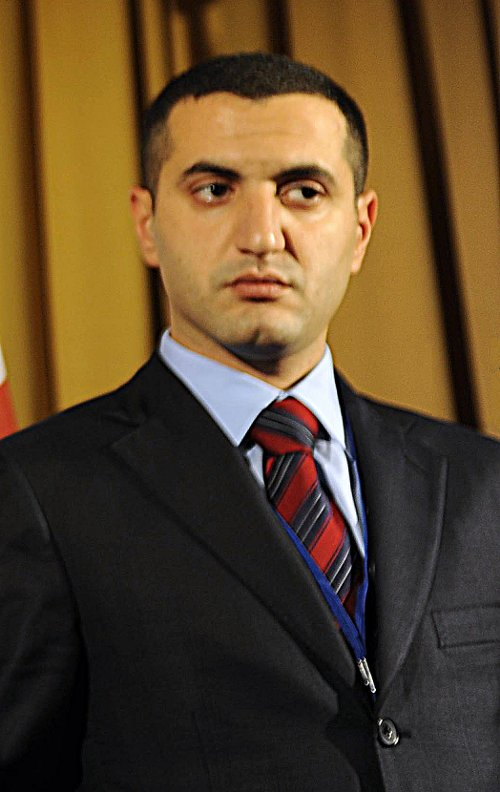

Minister of Defense of Georgia
- In office 10 November 2006 – 5 December 2008
- President: Mikheil Saakashvili; Nino Burjanadze (Acting); Mikheil Saakashvili
- Preceded by: Irakli Okruashvili
- Succeeded by: Vasil Sikharulidze

Personal details
- Born: 22 September 1978 (age 47) Tbilisi, Georgian SSR, USSR
- Party: National Movement - Democrats

Davit Kezerashvili (Georgian: დავით კეზერაშვილი) (born 22 September 1978) is a Jewish-Georgian-Israeli investor, entrepreneur and former Minister of Defense of Georgia under Mikheil Saakashvili's presidency from November 2006 to December 2008. Kezerashvili currently resides in the United Kingdom and is sentenced to imprisonment in Georgia for corruption charges that he has argued are politically motivated.

== Early life and education ==
Kezerashvili was born in Tbilisi to a Jewish family. After migrating to Russia, he went to Israel in 1992, where he lived with his grandmother in the Kiryat Ben-Gurion neighbourhood of Holon and attended high school. After a year and a half, he left Israel and returned to Georgia. He studied law and international relations at Tbilisi State University.

== Career ==
After working in the Ministry of Justice in Georgia, he became an assistant to Mikheil Saakashvili, the then Minister for Justice.

In 2002, Kezerashvili became involved in the newly established United National Movement (UNM) party, and contested in the 2003 Georgian parliamentary election under its banner. After the party rose to power in 2003, Kezerashvili worked in the Finance Ministry from 2004 until November 2006, including a role as chair of the financial police force. On 11 November 2006 he was appointed Defense Minister. Kezerashvili resigned as defense minister on 5 December 2008 during a major cabinet shuffle. His dismissal was expected in the aftermath of Georgia's defeat in the 2008 South Ossetia War. Kezerashvili was succeeded by former ambassador to the United States, Vasil Sikharulidze.

=== Conviction in Georgia ===
After the change of power in Georgia in 2012, the new government opened an investigation against Kezerashvili. He was alleged to have embezzled €5 million ($5.2 million) during his tenure as defense minister under the auspices of a combat training project. Kezerashvili denied the allegations and was acquitted of embezzlement by the Tbilisi City Court and the Tbilisi Court of Appeals.

The Georgian government has made repeated failed attempts to extradite Kezerashvili to Georgia. In October 2013, Kezerashvili was detained on an Interpol warrant in France, with the Georgian government seeking his extradition. The Aix-en-Provence City Court ruled against his extradition and Kezerashvili was released in early 2014. INTERPOL declared a search for Kezerashvili by red notice in 2014. However, INTERPOL revoked its red notice the next year.

In 2016, the United Kingdom also refused to extradite Kezerashvili to Georgia. At the Westminster Magistrates' Court in London, the Senior District Judge Howard Riddle heard that Interpol had stated “it would refuse to provide police cooperation to Georgia” because “such cooperation would not conform with article 3 of its constitution” and that “there are concerns over the political motivation or prosecutions, and an alleged lack of due process in the context of pre-trial detention.” In dismissing the extradition request, the judge stated that witnesses on Kezerashvili's behalf were “persuasive and moving” and that the “defense has provided live and credible evidence that casts considerable doubt over the basis of the case against Mr Kezerashvili.”

In September 2021, the Supreme Court of Georgia overturned both acquittals against and sentenced him to 10 years in prison in absentia. Due to the amnesty, he would serve only five years in prison. Kezerashvili argued that the charges were politically motivated against him. In December 2024, the European Court of Human Rights ruled Kezerashvili's right to a fair trial had been violated as a result of the case being heard by a judge who had previously worked in the General Prosecutor's office.

It has been reported that the State Prosecutor's Office of Israel for Tax and Financial Crimes may also charge Kezerashvili for corruption.

In December 2024, Russia's Federal Security Service (FSB) raided a call center it said was part of an international network that operating in Kezerashvili's interests. Officials allege the call center defrauded 100,000 people in 50 countries, including the European Union. The group's daily profits reportedly group’s reached $1 million a day, mainly through illegal investment scams.

=== Georgian politics and media ===
On 3 September 2019, Kezerashvili bought control packet of shares of TVFormula, a pro-opposition Georgian TV channel.

Kezerashvili is considered to be a major financial donor to several Georgian opposition parties, including the United National Movement, Strategy Aghmashenebeli and Droa. He has also financially supported Girchi TV, operated by the opposition Girchi — More Freedom party. It was reported that he was linked to attempts to remove Nikanor Melia as Chair of the UNM. Melia accused Kezerashvili of attempting to gain "informal influence" over the party.

== See also ==
- Foreign relations of Georgia (country)
- Politics of Georgia
