= Grigol Giorgadze =

Grigol Giorgadze

Grigol Giorgadze (Georgian: გრიგოლ გიორგაძე) (November 30, 1879 – July 18, 1937) was a Georgian historian, jurist and politician.

== Early life ==
Born in Kutaisi into the family of a priest, Giorgadze graduated from a local theological seminary in 1902 and from the Kharkiv University in 1909. Returning to Georgia, he practiced law in his native Kutaisi from 1909 to 1917. At the same time, he edited the local Social Democratic Party newspaper P'oni.

== Career ==
After Georgia's declaration of independence, he served as a Minister of War in the government of the Noe Ramishvili from 1918 to 1919 and then was elected to the Constituent Assembly of Georgia. From 1920 to 1921, he led an opposition group "Skhivi" ("Beam") within the Georgian Social Democratic (Menshevik) Party. After the Sovietization of Georgia, he retired from politics and worked as a legal consultant in Georgia and Kazakhstan and engaged in research of pre- and revolutionary Georgia's history. During Joseph Stalin's Great Purge, he was arrested, exiled to Kazakhstan, and shot at Almaty.
