= Tina Khidasheli =

Georgian politician and lawyer

- თინა ხიდაშელი
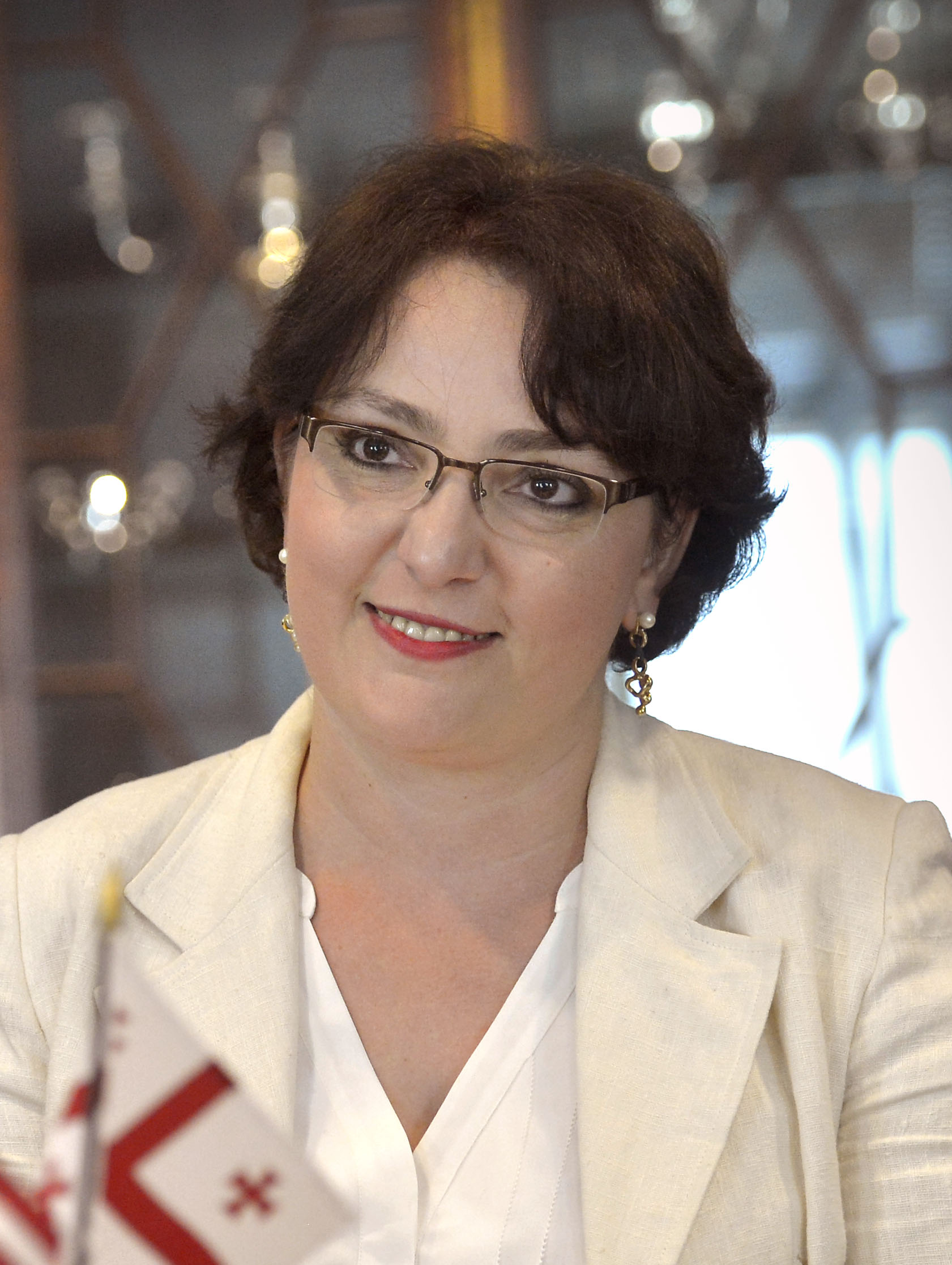

Minister of Defence
- In office 1 May 2015 – 1 August 2016
- Prime Minister: Irakli Garibashvili; Giorgi Kvirikashvili
- Preceded by: Mindia Janelidze
- Succeeded by: Levan Izoria

Member of Parliament of Georgia
- In office 21 October 2012 – 8 May 2015
- Preceded by: Zaza Gulikashvili
- Succeeded by: Tamar Khidasheli
- Parliamentary group: Georgian Dream
- Constituency: Sagarejo

Personal details
- Born: 8 June 1973 (age 53) Tbilisi, Georgian SSR, Soviet Union (now Tbilisi, Georgia)
- Party: Republican Party (2005-2016)
- Spouse: David Usupashvili
- Children: 2
- Education: Tbilisi State University(1995); Central European University (1996); Washington College of Law (1996)

Tinatin "Tina" Khidasheli (Georgian: თინათინ (თინა) ხიდაშელი; born 8 June 1973) is a Georgian jurist and politician. A Republican Party member and former civil society activist, she was appointed as Georgia's Minister of Defense on 1 May 2015, becoming the country's first ever female defense minister. She resigned on 1 August 2016, after her party decided to leave the ruling Georgian Dream coalition.

== Education and early career ==
Born in Tbilisi, Tina Khidasheli graduated from Tbilisi State University with a degree in international law in 1995. She became a Master of Political Science at the Central European University in Budapest in 1996. She was a human rights fellow at the Washington College of Law, and World fellow of Yale University. Having worked for several governmental and international organizations in Georgia, Khidasheli assumed presidency of the influential human rights group Georgian Young Lawyers' Association (GYLA) from 2000 to 2004. At the same time, she served as member of the State Anti-Corruption Council from 2002 to 2004. One of the vocal critics of the government of the-then President of Georgia Eduard Shevardnadze, Khidasheli was energetically involved in protest movement which brought about Shevardnadze's resignation in the Rose Revolution in November 2003. She, however, distanced herself from the new government led by Mikheil Saakashvili, her ally in the political struggle against Shevardnadze.

== Career ==
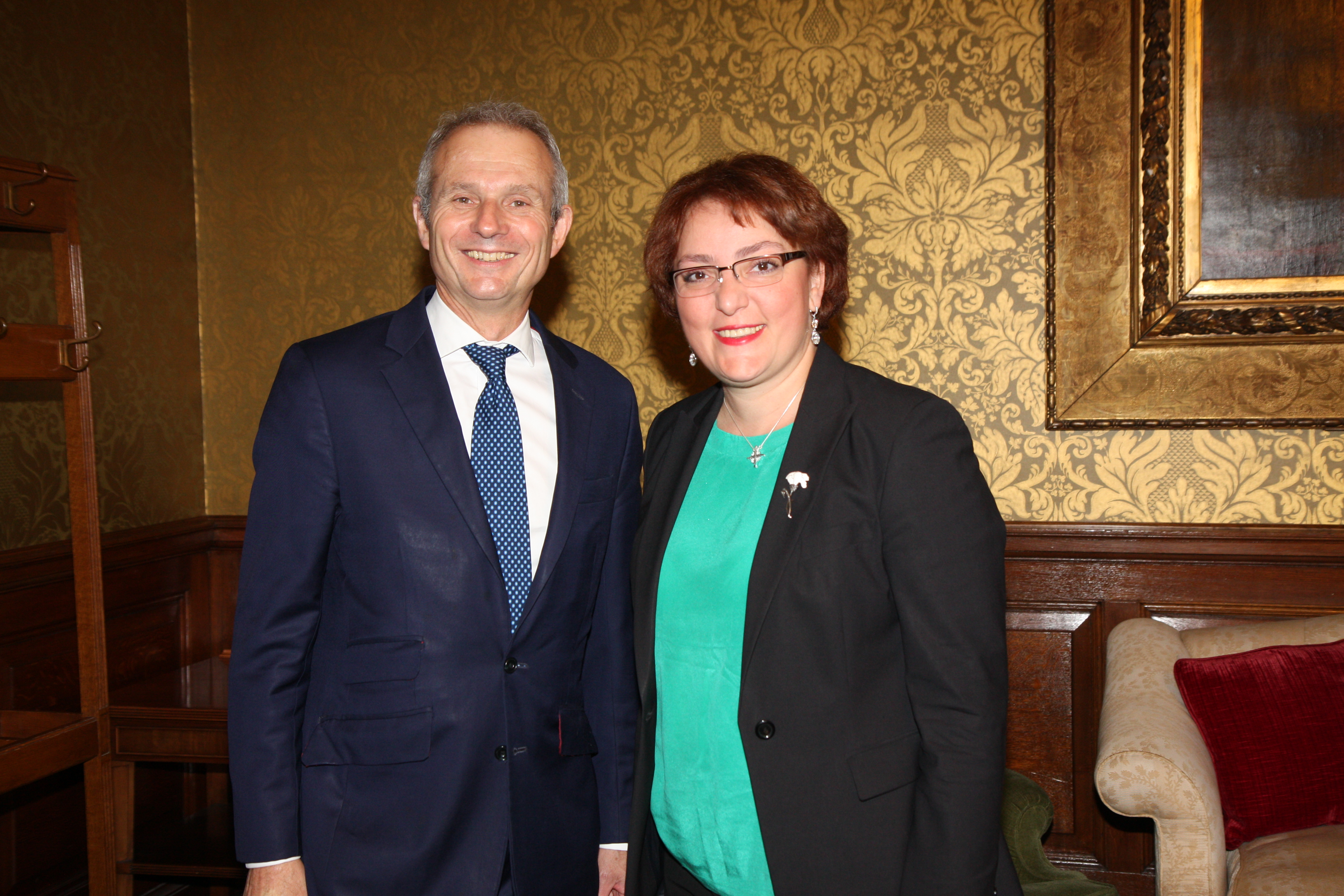
Khidasheli meets with British Minister for Europe David Lidington in London on September 17, 2015.

After a brief tenure as a Chairperson of the Board of Open Society Georgia Foundation (Soros Foundation) from 2004 to 2005, Khidasheli joined the Republican Party of Georgia, led by her husband, David Usupashvili. She served as that party's secretary for international affairs from 2005 to 2009. She was elected to the Council of Tbilisi in 2010 and entered the Parliament of Georgia after the Georgian Dream coalition, of which the Republican Party was member, defeated Saakashvili-led United National Movement in the 2012 election. She chaired the parliamentary committee on European integration.

In May 2015, Khidasheli succeeded Mindia Janelidze as Georgia's Defense Minister. During her tenure, Khidasheli sought close cooperation with NATO and the United States. She also announced an intention to the end of compulsory conscription as part of military reforms. She voiced strong opposition to mandatory military service and abolished it in June 2016, making Georgia a first post-Soviet state to do so. After the Republican Party decided to leave the Georgian Dream coalition ahead of the scheduled October 2016 parliamentary election, Khidasheli filed resignation and was succeeded by the former security official Levan Izoria. Khidasheli herself criticized the government's choice of her successor, who soon reintroduced the mandatory military service.

== Personal life ==
Khidasheli is married to David Usupashvili, the former chairman of the Parliament of Georgia.

== See also ==
- First women lawyers around the world
- Tina KHIDASHELI and Kristin Krohn DEVOLD: Female Defense Ministers from Georgia and Norway discuss NATO, gender, civil society: interview for Caucasian Journal (2021)
