= Giorgi Karkarashvili =

Georgian politician and former general (born 1966)

Major General Giorgi Karkarashvili
- Born: October 31, 1966 (age 59); Tbilisi, Georgian SSR, Soviet Union
- Military career
- Allegiance: Soviet Union; Georgia
- Branch: Georgian Army
- Rank: Major general
- Commands: Georgian Armed Forces
- Conflicts: Soviet–Afghan War; Georgian Civil War; South Ossetia War; War in Abkhazia

Giorgi (Gia) Karkarashvili (Georgian: გიორგი [გია] ყარყარაშვილი) (born October 31, 1966) is a Georgian politician and retired major general who served as Georgia's Minister of Defense from May 1993 to March 1994. A former Soviet army captain, he was a high-profile military commander during the civil war and wars against the secessionists in Abkhazia and South Ossetia in the 1990s. A gunshot wound received in the 1995 attack in Moscow left him severely disabled. He was a member of the Parliament of Georgia from 1999 to 2004. He is currently a member of the Our Georgia – Free Democrats party led by Irakli Alasania.

== Early career ==
Born in Tbilisi, then-Soviet Georgia, Karkarashvili graduated from the Tbilisi Higher Artillery Command School in 1987 and served in the Soviet military in East Germany, Afghanistan, and Georgia until January 1991 when he resigned as a captain and recruited the Georgian deserters from the Soviet army into the paramilitary unit Tetri Artsivi ("White Eagle") which was soon integrated into the National Guard of Georgia. Karkarashvili became commander of the Guard in Tbilisi. He took part in fighting against the South Ossetian militias in the early months of 1991 and was promoted to colonel.

In December 1991, Karkarashvili joined the Tengiz Kitovani-led rebellious faction of military in a violent coup against President Zviad Gamsakhurdia and headed a storm of the government's building which ended in Gamsakhurdia's flight from Tbilisi in January 1992. Karkarashvili then commanded a force of the post-coup regime – the Military Council – which operated against Gamsakhurdia's supporters in western Georgia and commanded a march of the National Guard detachment into Abkhazia in a show of force to deter secessionist sentiments in the area. When fighting resumed in South Ossetia in May 1992, Karkarashvili was put in command of Georgian forces which recovered several ethnic Georgian villages, winning to its 26-year-old commander the rank of major-general. He soon resigned, citing dissatisfaction with Shevardnadze's acceptance of Russian-proposed terms of the peace settlement.

== Career ==
In August 1992, the rising tensions in Abkhazia escalated into armed conflict. Karkarashvili was put in command of the Georgian troops in the regional capital Sukhumi. His televised address broadcast (in Russian) by the local Sukhumi channel on August 25, 1992, in which warned the secessionist leaders that “if 100,000 Georgians die, then all 97,000 [Abkhazians] on your side will be killed” sparked much controversy. His words have been cited in different forms in different sources and received by the Abkhaz side as a threat to cleanse the region of its Abkhaz populace. Years later, in a February 2009 interview to a Tbilisi-based Maestro TV, Karkarashvili claimed that the televised address was edited to make it appear he threatened to destroy the Abkhaz. “By the way Alexander Ankvab, who is now prime minister of Abkhazia, was present there when my address was being recorded and he can confirm my words,” he added, explaining that Ankvab was arrested by the Georgian forces, but soon released upon his own instruction.

Karkarashvili commanded the Georgian forces throughout the war in Abkhazia. He suffered the first major setback at Gagra in October 1992, when the Abkhaz forces and the allied North Caucasian militants under Shamil Basayev’s command took that town in a surprise attack, repulsing Karkarashvili's hastily organized counterattack. The battle took life of Karkarashvili's younger brother Gocha. Karkarashvili was able to defend Sukhumi until September 1993, when the beleaguered Georgian troops – now suffering in-fighting between rivaling factions – retreated from much of Abkhazia.

=== Minister of Defense ===
During the war in Abkhazia, the young general gained reputation of an energetic and dynamic commander, for which he was popular with the military. He was frequently critical of Shevardnadze's policies and displayed a tendency to independent decision-making. Nevertheless, in May 1993, Shevardnadze made him Minister of Defense, partly for his desire to sideline Tengiz Kitovani, the self-minded field commander and Karkarashvili's predecessor as minister. Karkarashvili attempted to make the Georgian military more integrated and disciplined. He named the Russian and Israeli armies to be models on which to build the Georgian military.

From October to November 1993, Karkarashvili took command of the government forces in a brief civil war reincited by Gamsakhurdia's attempt to regain power. In February 1994, he resigned his position in the government, citing Shevardnadze's decision to bring Georgia into the Commonwealth of Independent States, legalize the Russian military bases in Georgia, and to appoint Igor Giorgadze to state security ministry. He was later implicated in an embezzlement scandal and accused of supplying classified military information to the Abkhaz and Russian commanders during the war.

=== Assassination attempt and return to politics ===
In September 1994, Karkarashvili went to Moscow and enrolled into the Russian General Staff Academy. Early on January 25, 1995, Karkarashvili and his former deputy Major-General Paata Datuashvili were assaulted by three masked gunmen near the academy dormitory in Moscow. Datuashvili was killed on the spot. Karkarashvili – heavily wounded in head – survived, but was permanently disabled and left in wheelchair. The most popular explanation of the attack was that it was ordered by those interested in elimination of key witnesses of the 1991 coup and the Abkhaz war.

Returning to Georgia, Karkarashvili kept a lower profile and worked for the Public Defender’s office in Tbilisi from 1998 to 1999. In November 1999, he was elected to the Parliament of Georgia on the New Rights party ticket. As a member of pro-Shevardnadze election bloc, Karkarashvili ran for the parliament again in November 2003. The protests over the elections resulted in Shevardnadze's resignation in the Rose Revolution and in the snap parliamentary elections which brought Karkarashvili to the Parliament as a majoritarian for Tbilisi's Isani constituency in March 2004. He resigned his seat over health problems in November 2005.

=== Opposition ===
Karkarashvili came again to public attention after the August 2008 war between Georgia and Russia. He produced a report in which he accused the Georgian government for having mismanaged military operations. In February 2009, he joined a political group of Irakli Alasania, Georgia's former UN envoy, who withdrew into opposition to President Mikheil Saakashvili.

In May 2009, Karkarashvili's name was implicated by the retired officer Gia Ghvaladze, arrested in connection with the failed army mutiny as an alleged sympathizer with the coup plot. Karkarashvili rejected any links with the mutiny and released video footage showing him talking with the certain Melikidze who allegedly was trying to persuade him to take part in the mutiny. The Georgian Ministry of Internal Affairs expressed its gratitude to Karkarashvili for information provided by him as it helped to arrest Melikidze and prevent an assassination attempt on Interior Minister Vano Merabishvili.

Preceded by Tengiz Kitovani	Minister of Defense of Georgia; May 1993 – March 1994	Succeeded by Vardiko Nadibaidze
