= Mindia Janelidze =

Georgian politician (born 1978)

Mindia Janelidze მინდია ჯანელიძე
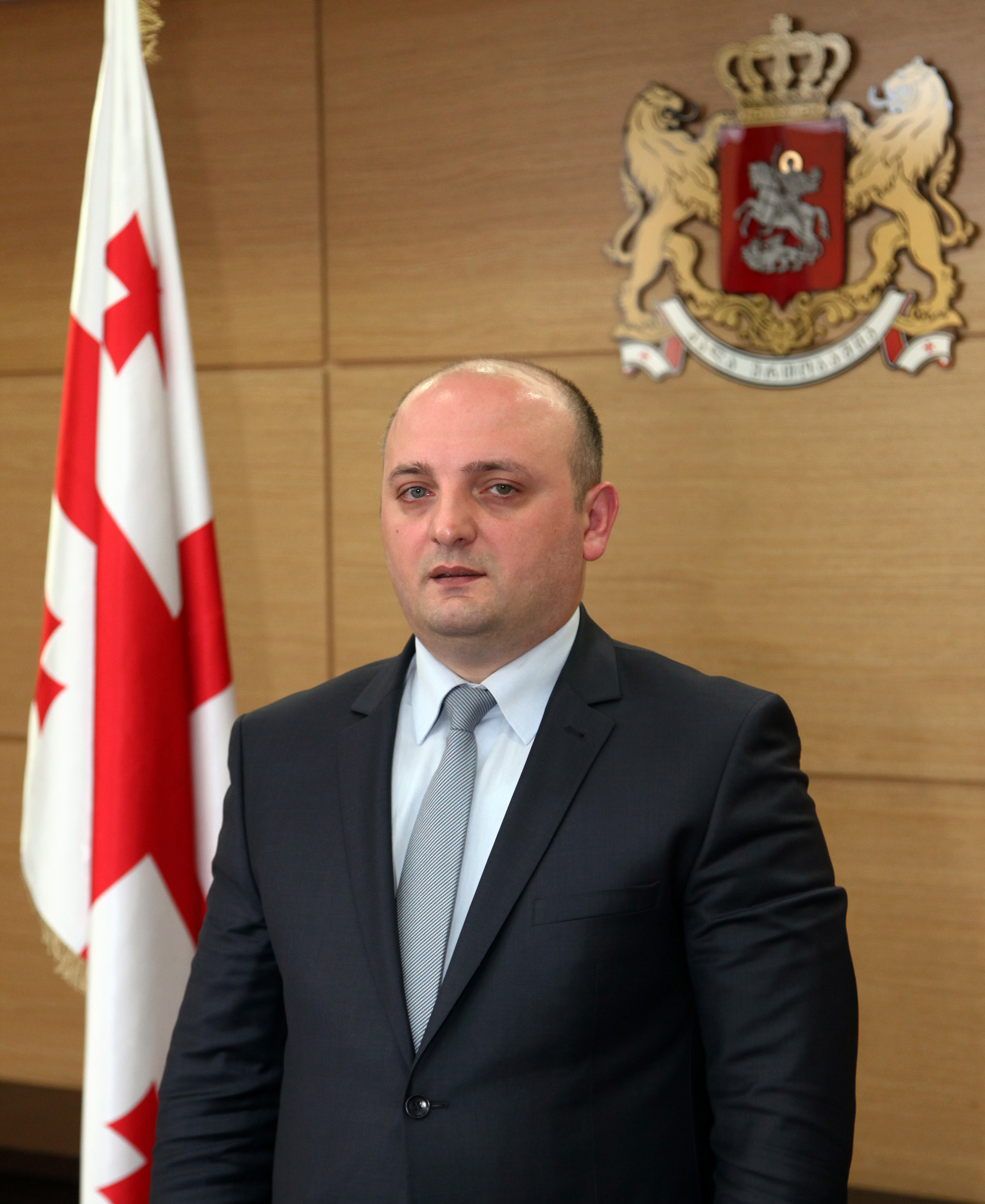

Minister of Defense
- In office 5 November 2014 – 1 May 2015
- Prime Minister: Irakli Garibashvili
- Preceded by: Irakli Alasania
- Succeeded by: Tina Khidasheli

Secretary, Council of State Security and Crisis Management
- In office January 2014 – 5 November 2014
- Prime Minister: Irakli Garibashvili
- Preceded by: Office established
- Succeeded by: Davit Sujashvili

Personal details
- Born: 26 July 1978 (age 48) Tbilisi, Georgian SSR, Soviet Union (Now Georgia)
- Spouse: Ekaterine Janelidze
- Children: Three
- Education: Academy of the State Security of Georgia

Military service
- Allegiance: Georgia
- Branch/service: Georgian Intelligence Service
- Years of service: 2000–2012
- Rank: Reserve Colonel

Mindia Janelidze (Georgian: მინდია ჯანელიძე; born 26 July 1978) is a Georgian security official and politician who as the country's Minister of Defense in the Cabinet of Irakli Garibashvili from 5 November 2014 to 1 May 2015. In May 2015, he was appointed Secretary of Council of State Security and Crisis Management, an office he had once filled from January to November 2014.

== Early life and career ==
Janelidze was born in Tbilisi, the capital of then-Soviet Georgia in 1978. He graduated from the Academy of the State Security of Georgia with a degree in law in 2000. He served as a field officer for Georgia's Foreign Intelligence Service from 2000 to 2004 and held various positions in the intelligence agencies from 2004 to 2012. He directed Georgia's Interior Ministry's Counter-Intelligence Department from 2012 until being appointed, in January 2014, as an aide to Prime Minister and Janelidze's former superior as the Interior Minister, Irakli Garibashvili, in national security issues and secretary of the recently established Council of State Security and Crisis Management.

== Defense Minister ==
On 5 November 2014 Mindia Janelidze was appointed by Prime Minister Garibashvili as Minister of Defense following the controversial dismissal of Irakli Alasania. Janelidze vowed to continue NATO-oriented "course of development of the armed forces". In his new capacity, Janelidze took part in negotiations with NATO officials over the implementation of "Substantial Package" offered by the alliance to Georgia at its 2014 Wales summit and oversaw the departure of Georgian troops as part of the country's continued commitment to the NATO-led efforts in Afghanistan, now within the frame of follow-on Resolute Support Mission.

Janelidze and his ministry became embroiled in a controversy over the Ministry's statement on the death of Aleksandre Grigolashvili, a pro-Ukrainian Georgian volunteer fighter, in the War in Donbass on 20 December 2014. The statement—blaming Georgia's former government for the death, and calling "on the citizens not to yield to provocation and not to endanger own lives in exchange of various offers”—drew widespread condemnation from several opposition and some ruling Georgian Dream coalition politicians as well as wider public. The opposition and formerly ruling United National Movement demanded that Janelidze resigned. The Ministry was forced to remove the text from its website and apologize, saying Janelidze had not been familiar with its content prior to its publication. The minister himself declined to make further comments, adding that it was not in Georgia's "national interests to participate in any military conflict" in Ukraine. Janelidze was replaced with Tinatin Khidasheli in the cabinet reshuffle on 1 May 2015.
