= David Tevzadze =

Georgian former military commander

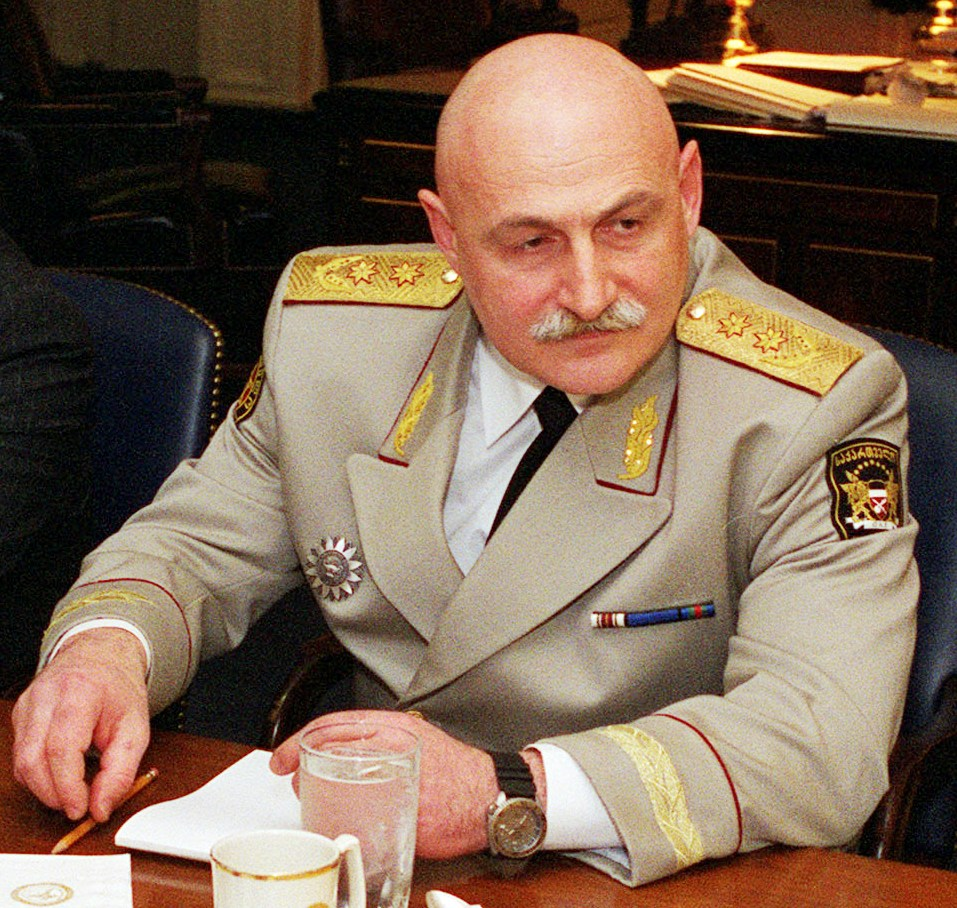
- General David Tevzadze

Advisor to the President for Strategic Planning
- Incumbent
- Assumed office February 21, 2022
- President: Salomé Zourabichvili

Minister of Defense
- In office April 28, 1998 – February 17, 2004
- President: Eduard Shevardnadze
- Preceded by: Vardiko Nadibaidze
- Succeeded by: Gela Bezhuashvili

Georgian Ambassador to NATO
- In office February – June 2004
- President: Mikheil Saakashvili

Personal details
- Born: 30 January 1949 (age 77) Sukhumi, Abkhaz ASSR, Georgian SSR, Soviet Union

Military service
- Allegiance: Republic of Georgia
- Branch/service: Georgian Land Forces
- Years of service: 1991-2004
- Rank: Lieutenant general
- Commands: Georgian Armed Forces
- Battles/wars: War in Abkhazia (1992–1993)

David Tevzadze (Georgian: დავით თევზაძე; born 30 January 1949) is a retired Georgian lieutenant general who was the country’s Minister of Defense from April 1998 to February 2004.

== Education and academic career ==
Born in Sukhumi, Abkhaz ASSR, Georgian SSR, Tevzadze graduated from the Tbilisi State University (TSU) Faculty of Philosophy in 1971 and Institute of Foreign Languages in 1978. He then obtained Ph.D. at the Georgian Academy of Sciences Institute of Philosophy where he worked as a researcher and also lectured in history of philosophy and mathematical logic at the TSU for several years. He also took an interest in martial arts and was a co-founder and the first President of the Georgian Karate Federation in 1989. The Federation was formed on 8 April 1989, a day before the Soviet troops used force against a peaceful pro-independence rally in Tbilisi. Tevzadze and several other members of the organization resisted the advancing soldiers to secure a corridor for the protesters fleeing the scene of the crackdown.

== Early military career ==
With the declaration of Georgia’s independence from the Soviet Union and the outbreak of civil unrest (1991), Tevzadze joined the Kojori-headquartered paramilitary battalion “Orbi” (“hawk”) which he commanded from January 1992 to January 1993 and took part in the war with the secessionists in Abkhazia. After the merger of paramilitary units into the Georgian Armed Forces, Colonel Tevzadze became a commander of the 11th brigade of reconnaissance (1992–93) and then of the 1st brigade (1993–94). From May 1994 to August 1997, he headed a Foreign Relations Office at the Ministry of Defense of Georgia. From 1994 to 1996, he received training at various NATO education centers such as the NATO Defence College (Rome, Italy), George C. Marshall European Center for Security Studies (Garmisch-Partenkirchen, Germany), and Command and General Staff College (Fort Leavenworth, United States).

== Minister of Defense ==
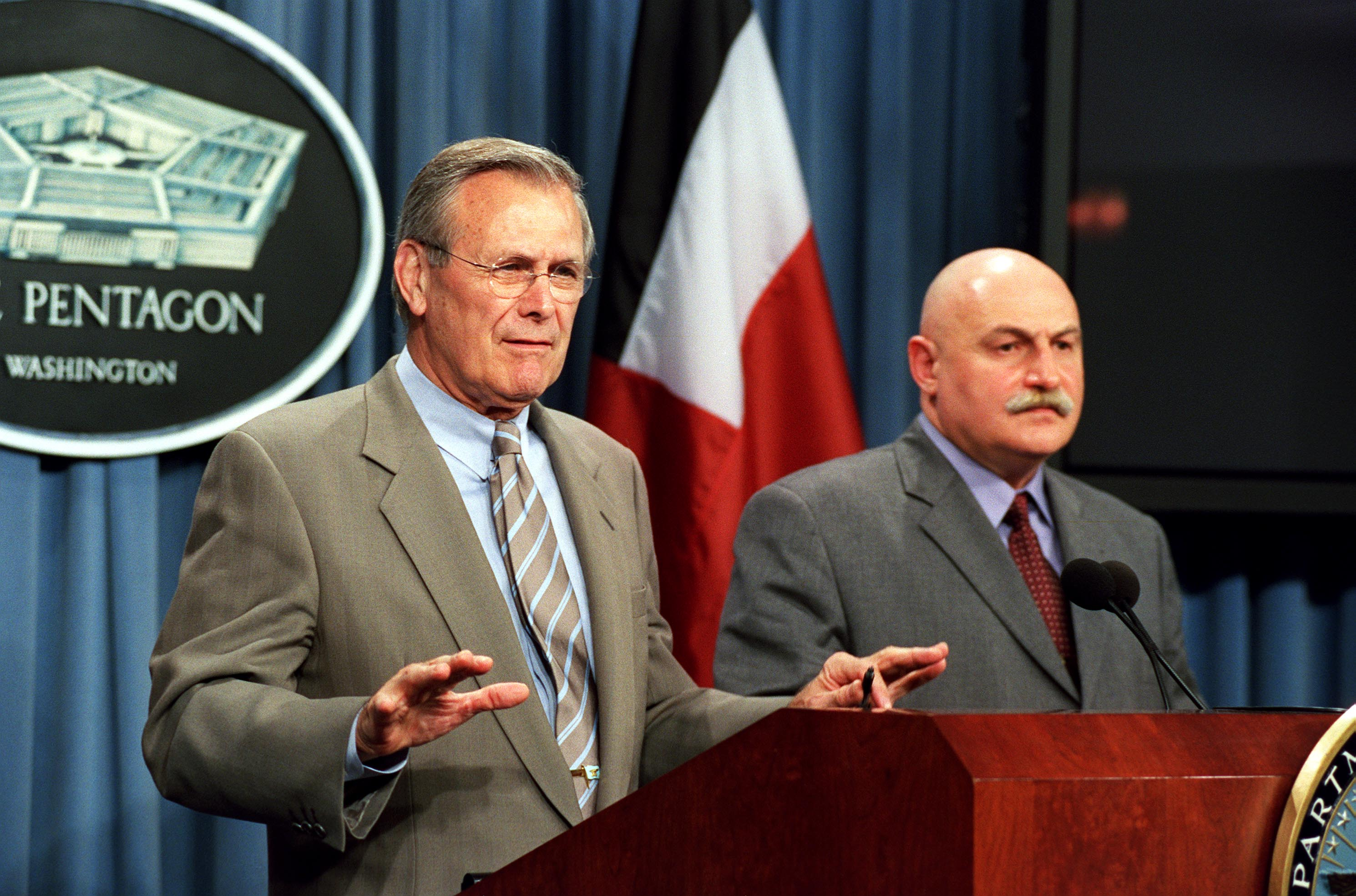
Joint press conference of Donald Rumsfeld and David Tevzadze

In April 1998, President of Georgia Eduard Shevardnadze dismissed Defense Minister Vardiko Nadibaidze, a career Soviet and Russian army officer, and replaced him with more Western-oriented Tevzadze. Amid persistent budgetary shortage and a series of attempted mutinies in the army, Tevzadze attempted to implement some reforms in the Georgian military with the declared aim to help transition “from old Soviet model to the modern forces, applicable to the international standards.” He was pursuant to a pro-NATO line declared by Georgia in 1998 and rejected the post of deputy head of the Coordinating Staff of the CIS Armed Forces in 2001, saying he saw no point in multilateral military cooperation between CIS states. It was during his tenure, that, in 2002, the United States launched a program of training for the selected Georgian military units (GTEP).

Tevzadze tried to remain neutral during the tense days of “Rose Revolution” in November 2003, when the opposition protests forced President Shevardnadze to resign. Tevzadze told reporters before the resignation that he had “received warnings that there should be no action that could lead to bloodshed.” He briefly retained his post in a new Georgian government. In this capacity he visited Georgian troops in Iraq. His plane was fired upon leaving Baghdad on 16 January 2004. The Coalition helicopters were dispatched and returned fire. No-one was injured and Tevzadze also escaped unharmed.

In February 2004, Tevzadze was dismissed as Defense Minister and nominated by President Mikheil Saakashvili as an ambassador to NATO. At the same time, he faced a series of accusations of corruption. The Parliamentary Committee for Defense and Security launched a probe into the cases of alleged corruptions in the Defense Ministry and summoned Tevzadze who admitted to certain violations in the Ministry, but refrained from naming the officials accountable for these violations. Tevzadze’s tenure as an ambassador proved to be short-lived, however, as his credentials were revoked in June 2004. Tevzadze distanced himself from politics and engaged in scholarship and teaching.

== Since 2004 ==
On 5 May 2009 Tevzadze's name was mentioned in a video footage released by the Georgian police as an evidence of the planned disorders in Georgia, of which the failed mutiny in army was part. Tevzadze said allegations about his involvement in the mutiny plot were "absurd."

In October 2015, Tevzadze founded his own political party, Georgia for Peace (საქართველო მშვიდობისათვის), to take part in the scheduled October 2016 parliamentary election.

In 2022, Davit Tevzadze was appointed by President Salome Zourabichvili as her Military Affairs Adviser.

Preceded by Vardiko Nadibaidze	Minister of Defense of Georgia; April 1998 — February 2004	Succeeded by Gela Bezhuashvili
