= Cooperative 09 =

Cooperative 09 or more commonly Cooperative Longbow/Cooperative Lancer 09 is the name of NATO military exercise held in Georgia within the framework of Partnership for Peace, Mediterranean Dialogue and Istanbul Cooperation Initiative programmes from May 6 until June 3, 2009. Exercises were conducted 30 km from Tbilisi at the Vaziani military base. Spanish Lieutenant General Cayetano Miro Valls was the commander of drills. Cooperative exercises are held annually in order to help NATO and its allies to maintain high level of cooperation during crisis response operations.

1100 soldiers from 14 countries took part in exercise, including 9 NATO members (Albania, Canada, Croatia, Greece, Hungary, Spain, Turkey, United Kingdom and the United States) and 5 PfP nations (Azerbaijan, Bosnia and Herzegovina, Macedonia, Georgia and Ukraine). Initially 18 countries were supposed to take part, but Armenia, Moldova, Serbia and Kazakhstan canceled their attendance in response to troop mutiny in Georgia.

Exercises consist of two parts, Cooperative Longbow 09 and Cooperative Lancer 09. Longbow is a Command Post exercise (CPX) and is focused on training and exercising NATO staff skills in order to improve interoperability between NATO and partner nations during crisis response operations at the multinational brigade level. Lancer is designed to provide basic training on peace support operations at the battalion level.

Russia strongly opposed to the drills in Georgia, Russian President Dmitry Medvedev referred to them as "an open provocation" and said the exercises were assisting Georgia's rearmament after the conflict with Russia over South Ossetia.
