= Dimitri Shashkini =

Georgian politician

Dimitri Shashkini დიმიტრი შაშკინი

Minister of Defense of Georgia
- In office 4 July 2012 – 25 October 2012
- President: Mikheil Saakashvili
- Prime Minister: Vano Merabishvili
- Preceded by: Bachana Akhalaia
- Succeeded by: Irakli Alasania

Minister of Education and Science of Georgia
- In office 21 December 2009 – 4 July 2012
- President: Mikheil Saakashvili
- Prime Minister: Nika Gilauri
- Preceded by: Nika Gvaramia
- Succeeded by: Khatia Dekanoidze

Minister of Corrections and Legal Assistance of Georgia
- In office 2 February 2009 – 21 December 2009
- Succeeded by: Khatuna Kalmakhelidze

Personal details
- Born: August 8, 1975 (age 50) Tbilisi, Georgia SSR, Soviet Union
- Party: United National Movement

Military service
- Branch/service: Akhaltsikhe Military Base of the Georgian Army
- Years of service: 1993-1996
- Rank: Lieutenant

Dimitri Shashkini (Georgian: დიმიტრი შაშკინი, Russian: Шашкин, Дмитрий Николаевич) (born 8 August 1975) is a Georgian politician of Russian descent, serving as the Minister of Defense of Georgia from 4 July 2012 to 25 October 2012.

== Early years ==
Shashkini was born on August 8, 1975, in Tbilisi, Georgia, to a family of Russian background stemming from Ukraine. In 1992-1993, he attended the Greek-Georgian University, studying International Law. From 1992 through 1993, he worked as an inspector at the weapons office in the Ministry of Internal Affairs of Georgia. From 1993 to 1998, he attended Tbilisi State University, graduating with a master's degree in Criminal Law with an emphasis on State, Tax and Criminal Law. He also briefly served as a Lieutenant at the Akhaltsikhe Military Base of the Georgian Armed Forces until 1996. In 1997-1998, Shashkini worked as a program assistant at the American Bar Association and from 1998 through 2001 as an assistant program officer at the International Republican Institute (IRI). In 2001, he was promoted to resident program officer at the same institution and in 2007 became the resident country director of IRI, retaining the position until 2009. Between 1998-2008, Shashkini also provided private consulting and management services to various candidates during election campaigns. He became IRI's chief of party in 2008.

== Political career ==
On February 2, 2009, Shashkini was appointed as the head of the newly established Ministry of Corrections and Legal Assistance of Georgia. On December 21, 2009, he was replaced by Khatuna Kalmaxelidze, and appointed Minister of Education and Science of Georgia. On July 4, 2012, he was moved to the position of Defense Minister of Georgia.

Shashkini said Georgia's defense policy would be built around "the principle of three Ts": Total Care, Total Training, and Total Defense. On October 25, 2012, following the parliamentary election which saw the defeat of the ruling United National Movement party, Shashkini was succeeded by Irakli Alasania as the Minister of Defense. Prior to that, on October 22, he confirmed, in a message posted on his Facebook page that he had left Georgia, saying that he had "spent the happiest four years of my life with Mikheil Saakashvili's government and together we have all elevated Georgia to the zenith of its development." He returned to Georgia in March 2013.

Shashkini is married and has two children.
