= Juansher Burchuladze =

Georgian politician

- ჯუანშერ ბურჭულაძე
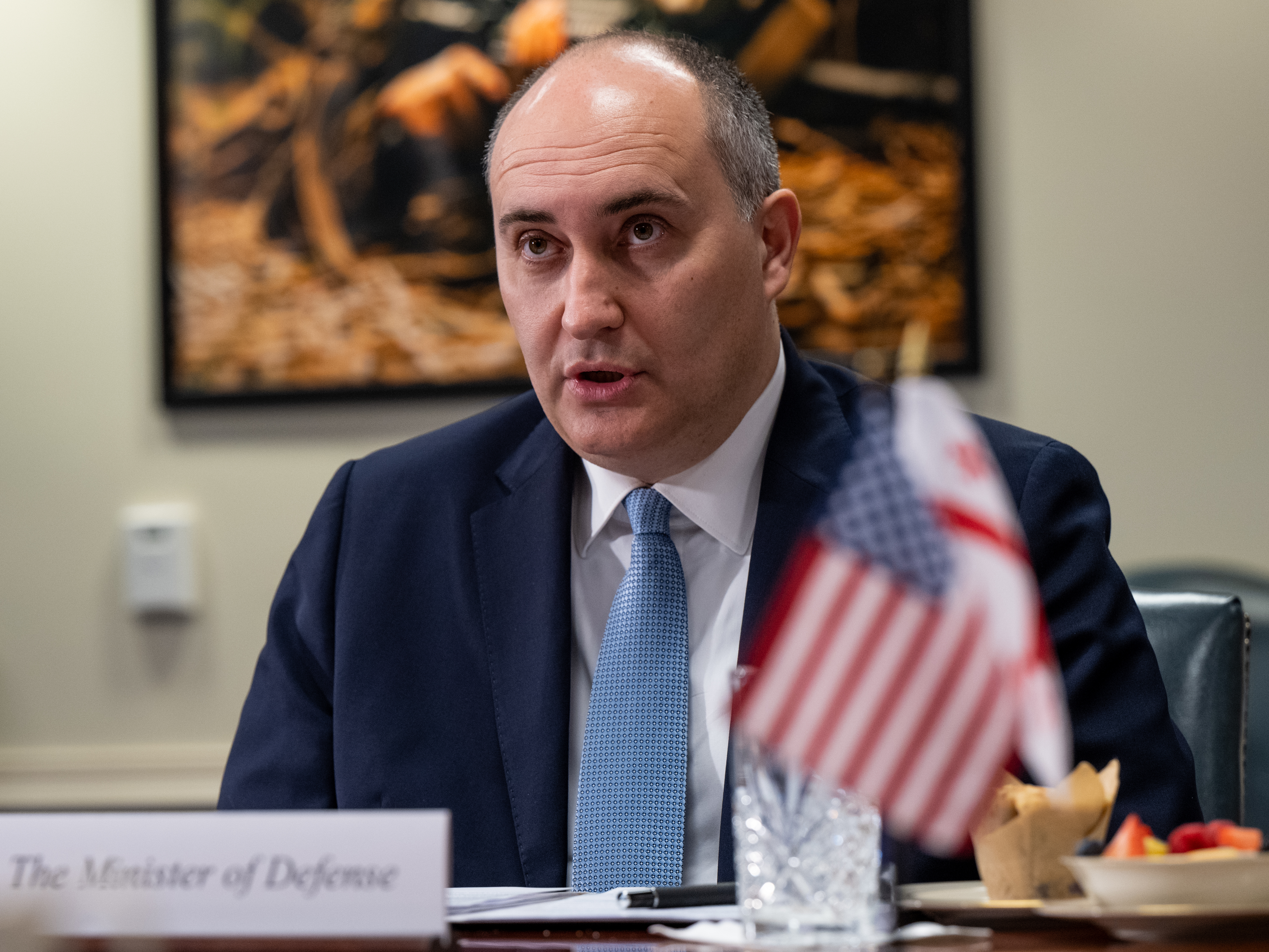
- Burchuladze in 2023

Minister of Defence
- In office 22 February 2021 – 8 February 2024
- Prime Minister: Irakli Garibashvili
- Preceded by: Irakli Garibashvili
- Succeeded by: Irakli Chikovani

Deputy Minister of Defence
- In office 2019–2021
- Prime Minister: Giorgi Gakharia
- Preceded by: Grigol Giorgadze
- Succeeded by: Zurab Azarashvili

Personal details
- Born: 14 January 1978 (age 48) Tbilisi, Georgian SSR, USSR
- Citizenship: Georgia

Juansher Burtchuladze (Georgian: ჯუანშერ ბურჭულაძე; born 14 January 1978) is a Georgian politician who served as the Minister of Defence in the Second Garibashvili government from 22 February 2021 until 8 February 2024.

== Biography ==
In 1998-1999, he was an intern at the Department of American Countries of the Ministry of Foreign Affairs of Georgia. In the early years of the decade, he was an economist at the National Bank of Georgia. From 2010-2015, he was a financial manager at the Embassy of Georgia in the US.

In addition to his native Georgian, he speaks fluent English, Turkish, Russian and Spanish.
