= Mukhrovani =

Mukhrovani მუხროვანი
- Location in Georgia
- Coordinates: 41°46′55″N 45°8′20″E
- Country: Georgia
- Region: Kakheti
- Municipality: Sagarejo

Population (2014)
  - Total: 16
- Time zone: UTC+4 (Georgian Time)

Mukhrovani (Georgian: მუხროვანი) is the name of a village and location in Kakheti, Georgia. It lies 30 kilometres (19 mi) east of the capital Tbilisi, and is known for hosting training areas for special operations forces.

== See also ==
- Kakheti
