= Irakli Chikovani =

Georgian politician (born 1980)

- ირაკლი ჩიქოვანი
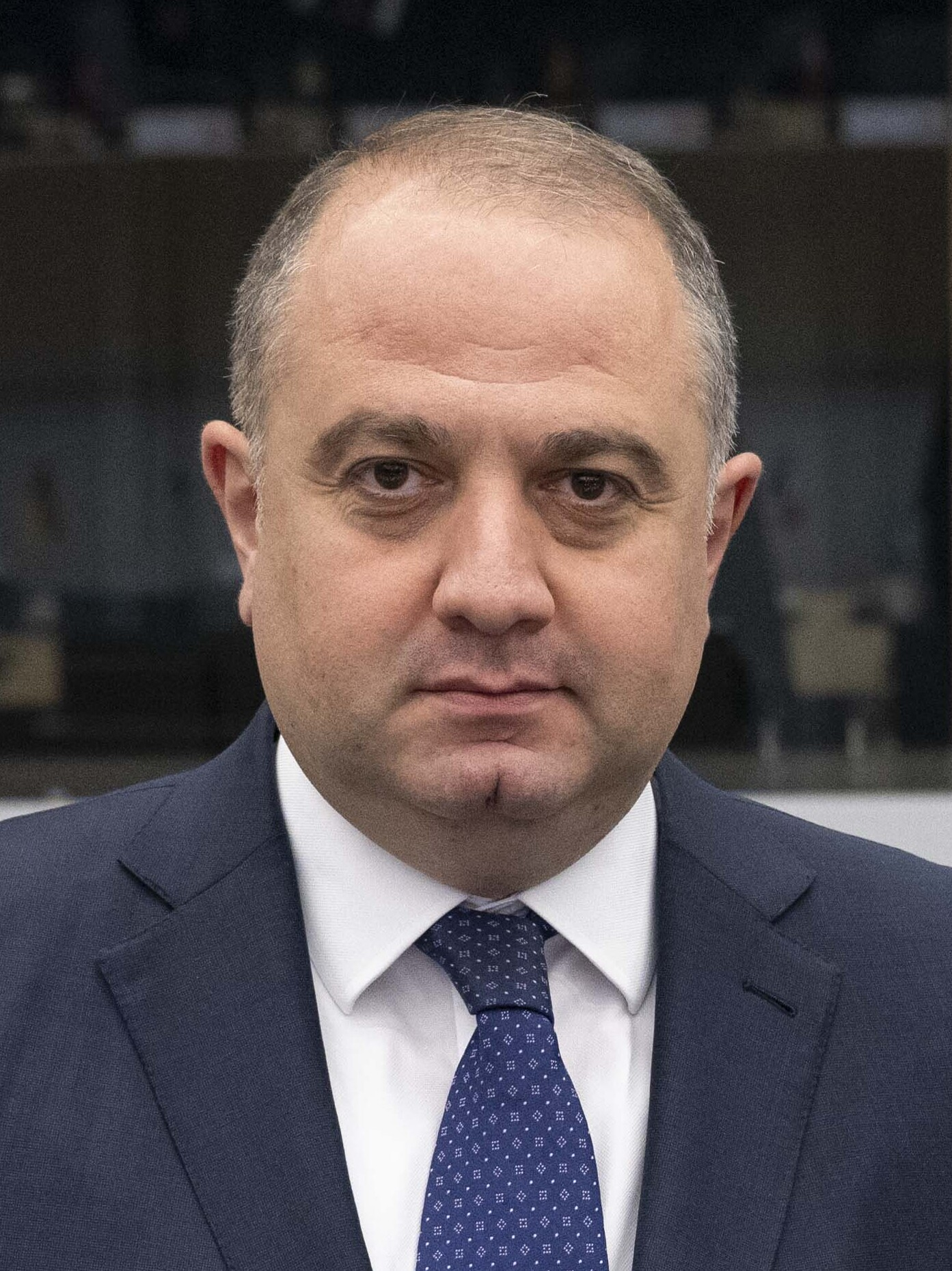
- Chikovani in 2024

Deputy Prime Minister of Georgia
- Incumbent
- Assumed office 8 February 2024 Serving with Thea Tsulukiani (2024–2024) Vakhtang Gomelauri (2024–2025) Mamuka Mdinaradze (2026– present) Maka Botchorishvili(2026– present)
- Prime Minister: Irakli Kobakhidze
- Preceded by: Levan Davitashvili

Minister of Defence
- Incumbent
- Assumed office 8 February 2024
- Prime Minister: Irakli Kobakhidze
- Preceded by: Juansher Burchuladze

Deputy Speaker of the Parliament of Georgia
- In office 16 November 2023 – 8 February 2024
- Speaker: Shalva Papuashvili

Member of the Parliament of Georgia
- In office 11 December 2020 – 20 February 2024
- In office 21 October 2012 – 18 November 2016

Personal details
- Born: 28 August 1980 (age 46) Zugdidi, Georgian SSR, Soviet Union (now Georgia)
- Citizenship: Georgia
- Party: Georgian Dream
- Spouse: Diana Zhgenti
- Children: 3
- Education: Tbilisi State University

Irakli Chikovani (Georgian: ირაკლი ჩიქოვანი; born 28 August 1980) is a Georgian politician who has served as the Deputy Prime Minister and the Minister of Defence of Georgia since February 8, 2024. A member of the Georgian Dream party, he was previously a Member of Parliament from 2020 to 2024 and 2012 to 2016.

== Biography ==
Chikovani joined politics in 2012, as a member of former Deputy Prime Minister Irakli Alasania's Free Democrats party, which was initially a part of the Georgian Dream coalition. After the coalition was disbanded, Chikovani participated in the Free Democrats 2016 election campaign, in which the party failed to obtain any seats. In 2020, Chikovani rejoined Georgian Dream and ran for MP in the Zugdidi constituency in that year's election, he won the seat with 93,88% of the vote. On February 8, 2024, Chikovani joined Prime Minister Irakli Kobakhidze's government as the Defence Minister and Deputy Prime Minister.
