= Vardiko Nadibaidze =

- Georgian: ვარდენ [ვარდიკო] ნადიბაიძე; Russian: Варден Михайлович Надибаидзе
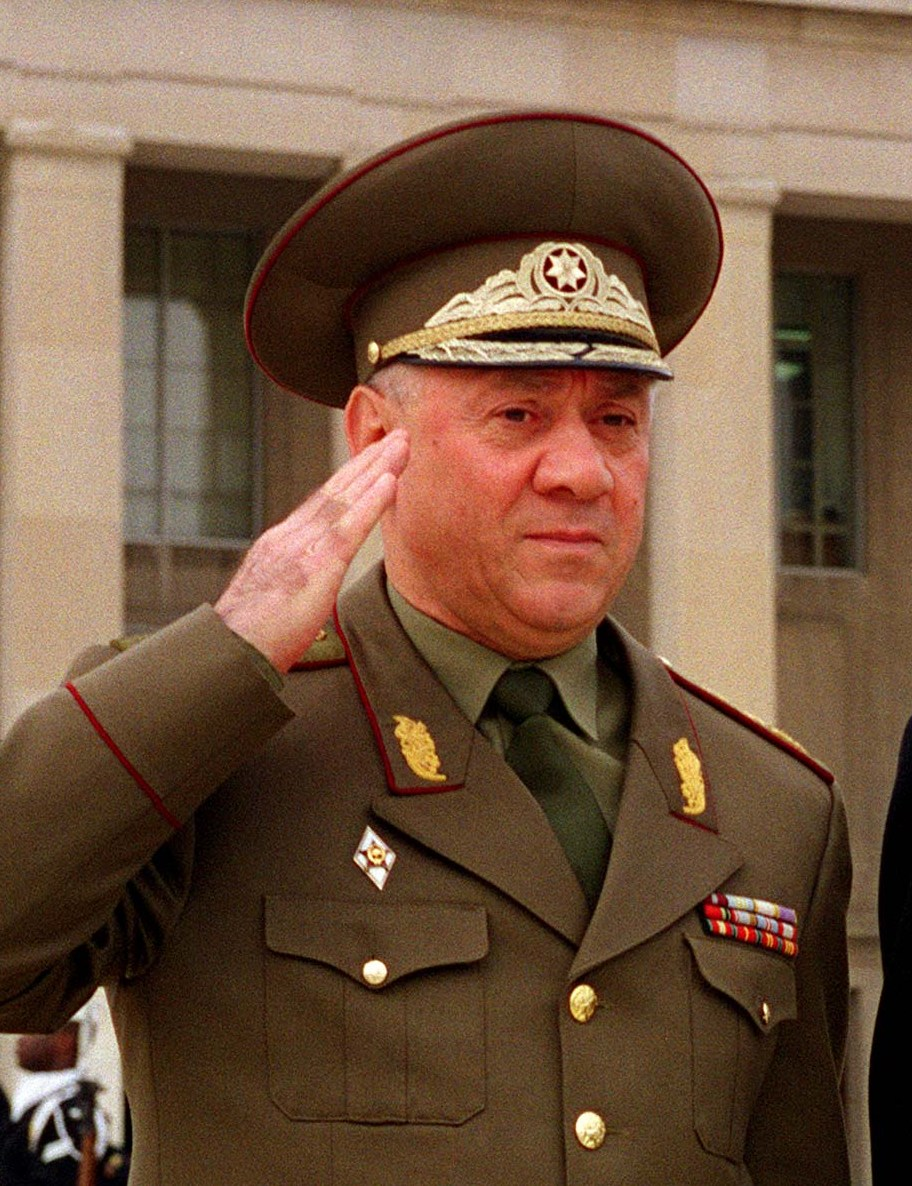
- General Vardiko Nadibaidze
- Born: March 31, 1939 (age 87); Mleta, Dusheti Municipality, Georgian SSR, USSR
- Military career
- Allegiance: USSR; Russia; Georgia
- Branch: Soviet Army; Georgian Army
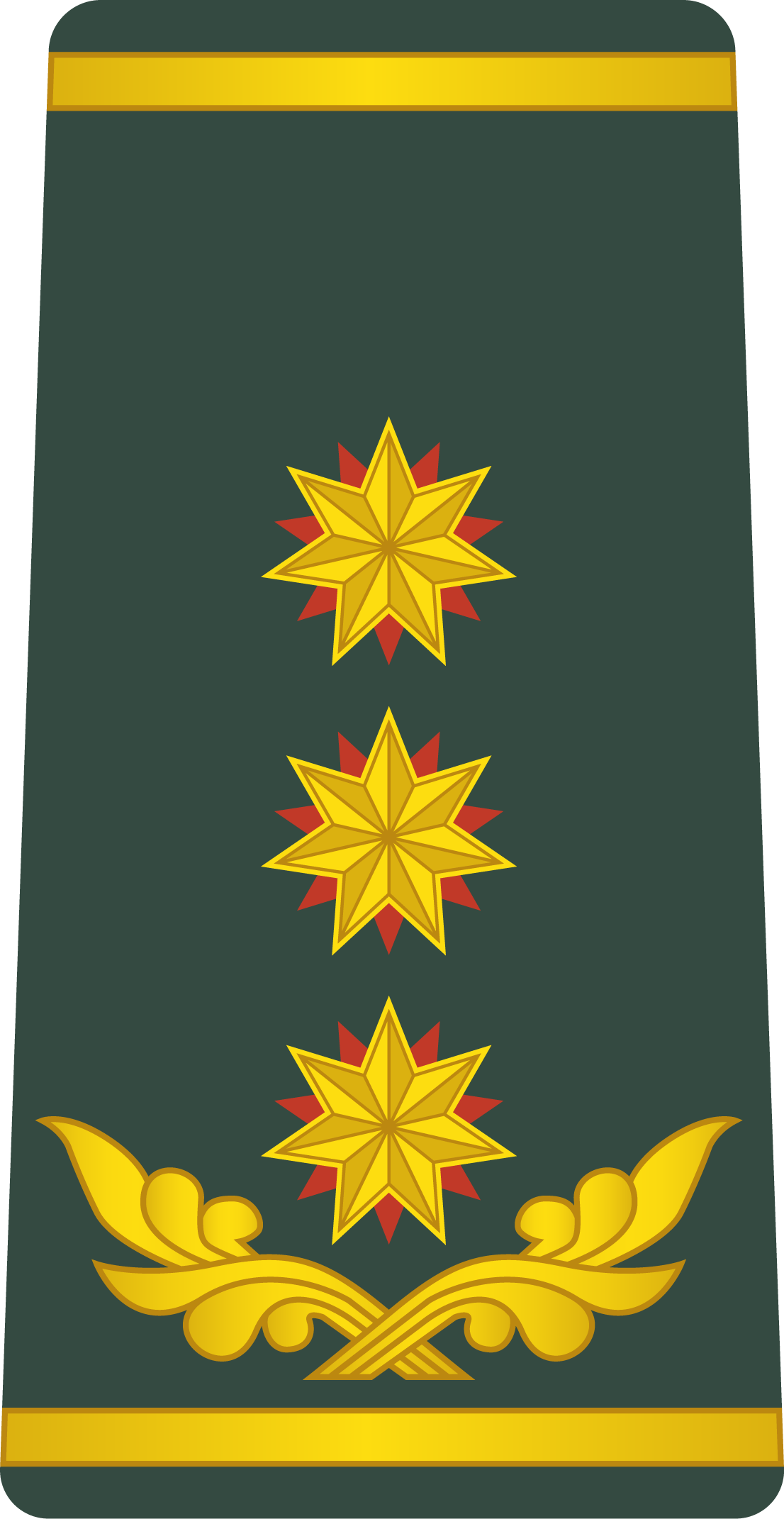
- Rank
- Commands: Georgian Armed Forces

Varden “Vardiko” Nadibaidze (Georgian: ვარდენ [ვარდიკო] ნადიბაიძე; Russian: Варден Михайлович Надибаидзе, lit. 'Vardiko Mikhailovich Nadibaidze'; born March 31, 1939) is a retired Soviet, Russian and Georgian military officer who served as Georgia’s Minister of Defense from 1994 to 1998.

== Early life and career ==
Nadibaidze was born in the village Mleta in then-Soviet Georgia. In 1955 he joined the Komsomol and in 1958 became a member of the Communist Party of the Soviet Union. He received military education in Soviet Russia and joined the Soviet Army as a motorised rifle officer in 1960. He served in Soviet units in Ukraine, East Germany, and Transcaucasia. In 1989, he was promoted to major general. After the dissolution of the Soviet Union, Nadibaidze continued his service in the Russian Army and, in 1992, was made the deputy commander of the Transcaucasian Military District headquartered in Georgia’s capital Tbilisi.

== Service in Georgian Armed Forces ==
In the chaotic aftermath of the Georgian Civil War, in April 1994, Georgia’s head of state Eduard Shevardnadze appointed Nadibaidze Minister of Defense of Georgia after General Gia Karkarashvili was forced to resign. Nadibaidze dismissed nationalistically minded officers and introduced ethnic Georgians from the Russian army and with Soviet military experience. Shevardnadze’s appointment of the Russian general who could barely speak Georgian to a key military post was seen in Georgia as a move which allowed Russia to control the Georgian military. Under Nadibaidze, the size of the army was reduced and the conscription system made more orderly. Nadibaidze supported close cooperation with Russia and was a personal friend of the Russian defense minister Pavel Grachev. When Grachev was sacked in 1996, Aleksandr Lebed, Chairman of Russia's Security Council, alleged that Nadibaidze was among the Russian officers plotting a coup in support of Grachev. The allegations were dismissed by Nadibaidze. Nadibaidze was a target of criticism from the opposition, most prominently by Giorgi Chanturia, and some government officials, such as Vice-Premier Tamaz Nadareishvili, who accused him of mismanaging the military.

== Downfall ==
After the 1998 attempt to assassinate Shevardnadze, with its revelations of army complicity, and with Shevardnadze looking to the West, Nadibaidze was replaced, in April 1998, by the United States-trained officer David Tevzadze.

== Later life ==
After his dismissal from office, Vardiko Nadibaidze finally withdrew from political life and began to lead a somewhat secluded lifestyle in his own house in Tbilisi.

== Awards ==
- Order of the Red Star (1991)
- Order "For Service to the Homeland in the Armed Forces of the USSR" III Class
- Order of the Badge of Honor
- Medal "For Labor Distinction"
- Medal "Veteran of the Armed Forces of the USSR"
- Jubilee Medal "50 Years of the Armed Forces of the USSR"
- Jubilee Medal "60 Years of the Armed Forces of the USSR"
- Jubilee Medal "70 Years of the Armed Forces of the USSR"
- Medal "For Impeccable Service" 1st, 2nd and 3rd Class

Preceded by Giorgi Karkarashvili	Minister of Defense of Georgia; March 1994 — April 1998	Succeeded by David Tevzadze
