= Bacho Akhalaia =

Georgian politician

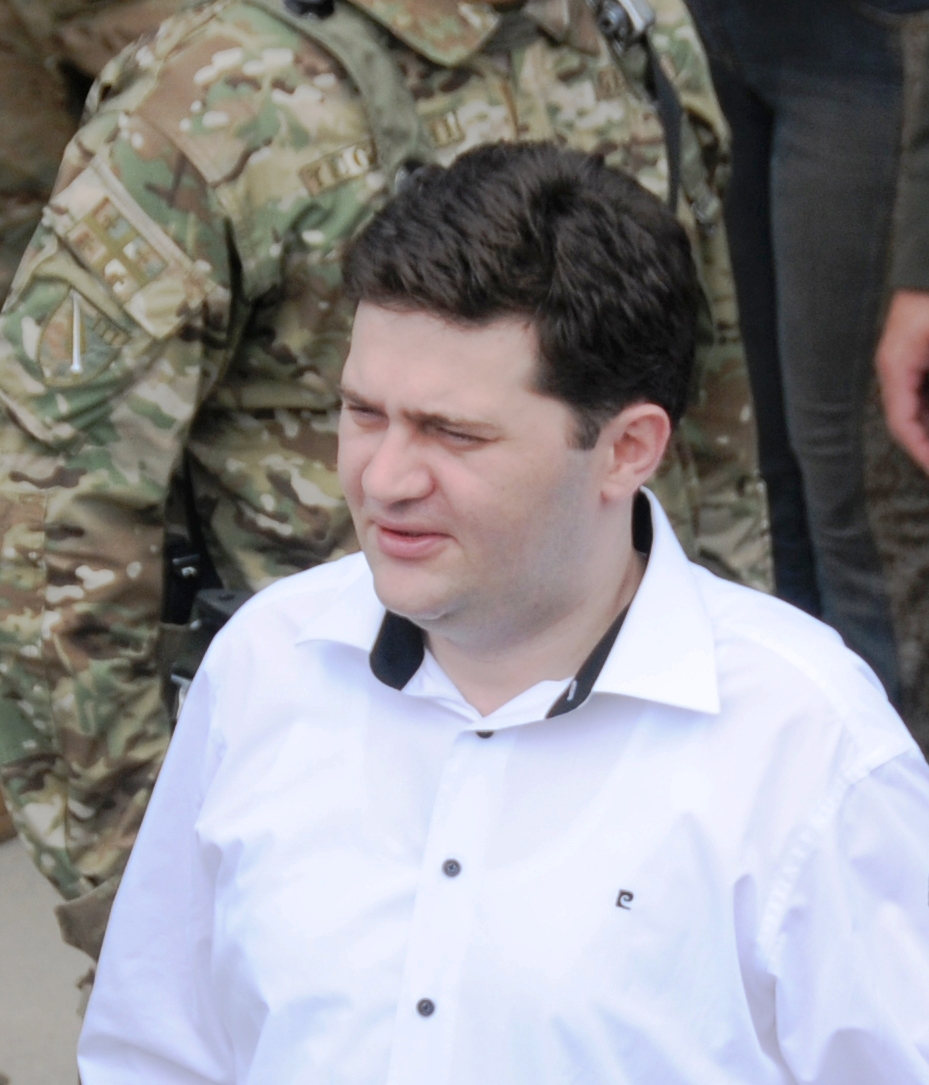
- Akhalaia in 2011

Minister of Internal Affairs of Georgia
- In office July 4, 2012 – September 20, 2012
- President: Mikheil Saakashvili
- Preceded by: Vano Merabishvili
- Succeeded by: Ekaterine Zguladze (acting)

Minister of Defense of Georgia
- In office August 27, 2009 – July 4, 2012
- President: Mikheil Saakashvili
- Preceded by: Vasil Sikharulidze
- Succeeded by: Dimitri Shashkin

Personal details
- Born: October 24, 1980 (age 45) Zugdidi, Georgian SSR, USSR
- Spouse: Anna Nadareishvili

Bachana "Bacho" Akhalaia (Georgian: ბაჩანა "ბაჩო" ახალაია; born October 24, 1980, in Zugdidi) is a Georgian politician who was Minister of Internal Affairs of Georgia from July 4, 2012, to September 20, 2012. He had previously served as Head of Penitentiary Department of Ministry of Justice of Georgia (2005–2008) and Minister of Defense (August 27, 2009 – July 4, 2012).

On September 20, 2012, amid protests against torture and rapes in Georgian prisons, the Ministry of Internal Affairs announced Akhalaia had resigned from office.

== Early career ==
Akhalaia graduated from the Tbilisi State University with a degree in law in 2003. From 2003 to 2004, he worked for the NGO Liberty Institute, known for his role in protests that led to the Rose Revolution in Georgia in November 2003. From 2004 to 2005, Akhalaia served as deputy Public Defender (Ombudsman) under his fellow Liberty Institute activist Sozar Subari. In 2005, Akhalaia was moved to the post of Head of Penitentiary Department of Ministry of Justice of Georgia. In this capacity he led a struggle against the established system of "thieves in law" which ruled prisons in the post-Soviet country, but he was a frequent target of criticism by the opposition, some human rights groups and Public Defender Subari. In particular, he was accused of heavy-handed crackdown on Georgia's largest prison riot in 2006, in which 7 inmates died.

Akhalaia has been seen as a close ally of Saakashvili and the influential Interior Minister Vano Merabishvili. His brother, Data Akhalaia, headed Department for Constitutional Security at the Interior Ministry and his father, Roland Akhalaia, was a chief prosecutor of Samegrelo-Zemo Svaneti region in western Georgia and the current member of the Parliament of Georgia.

== Minister of Defense ==
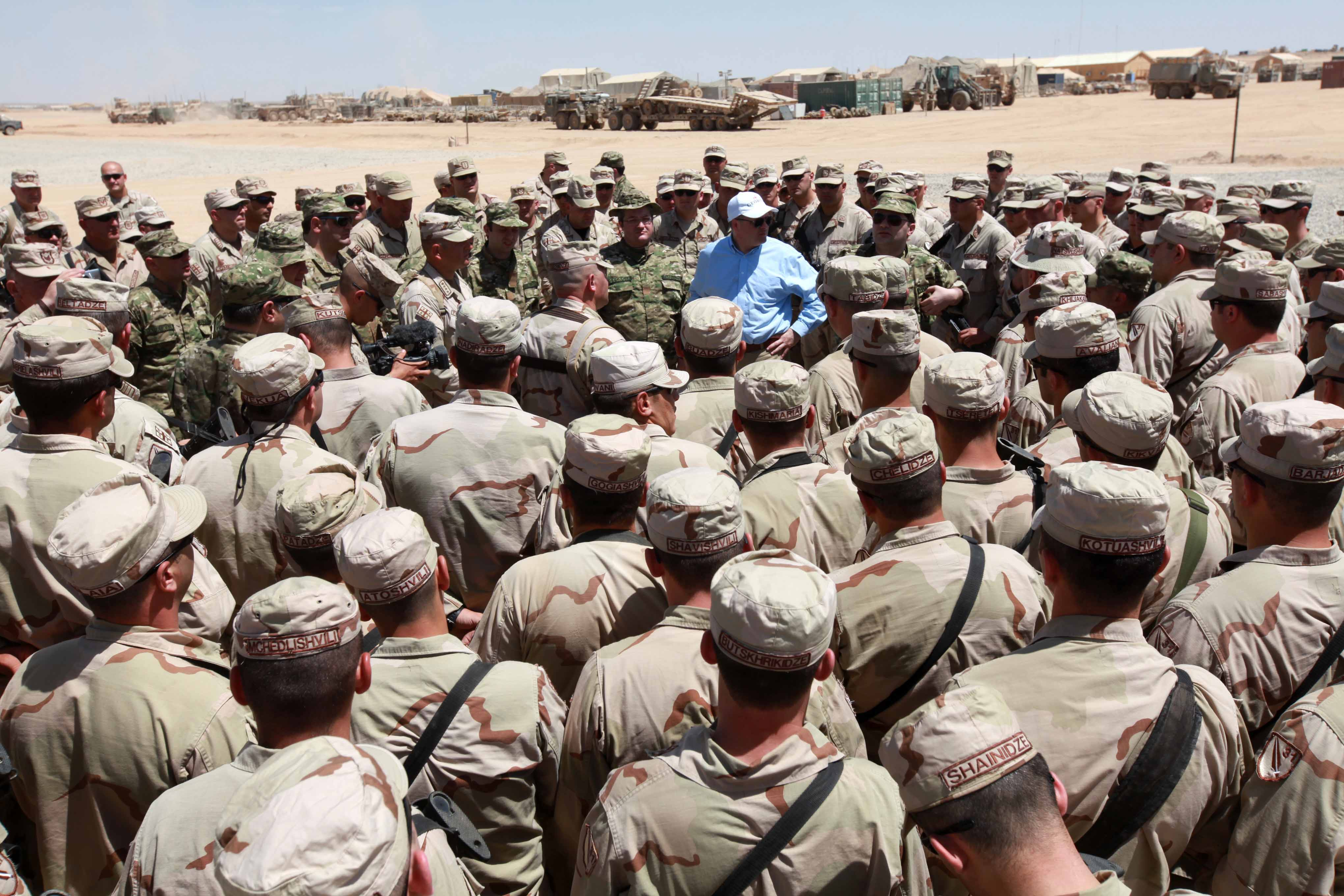
Bacho Akhalaia gathers with the 31st Georgian Battalion aboard Camp Delaram II, Helmand Province, during his visit to the camp.

In December 2008, in the aftermath of the August 2008 war with Russia, Akhalaia was appointed deputy Minister of Defense. The Georgian media ran stories about Akhalaia's alleged tensions with then-Minister Vasil Sikharulidze and Chief of Joint Staff Vladimer Chachibaia. On August 27, 2009, Akhalaia replaced Sikharulidze as Minister of Defense. President of Georgia Mikheil Saakashvili said "much stricter hand" was needed in the military and praised Akhalaia's past achievements. The Georgian opposition subjected the decision to harsh criticism.

Akhalaia oversaw the establishment of The State Military Scientific-Technical Center "DELTA," which resulted in significant advancements in armored personnel carriers (APCs), artillery, and various other military equipment. Akhalaia assumed the role of Minister of Defense of Georgia, prioritizing the modernization of the defense system, fostering scientific advancements within the military, and enhancing military intelligence capabilities. During his tenure, he instigated educational reforms at both the Military Academy and Cadet Military Lyceum In 2010, by a decision of the Ministry of Defence, the Academy acquired the status of a Legal Entity of Public Law. The National Defense Academy also got the status of a higher education institution The Giorgi Kvinitadze Cadet Military Lyceum was opened in Kutaisi in 2010, by order of the Minister of Defense

== Military Production ==
Under Akhalaia's tenure as defense minister, a military production initiative was initiated, leading to the modernization of The State Military Scientific-Technical Center "DELTA" (SMSTC Delta). Delta took shape in its current configuration in 2010. Delta underwent significant restructuring, becoming affiliated with six scientific research institutes and the 31st Tbilisi Aircraft Factory. Primarily dedicated to defense-related endeavors, the organization also engages to a lesser extent in civilian industries. Operating independently from state regulatory bodies, its oversight falls under the purview of the Ministry of Defense of Georgia. During his tenure, Akhalaia facilitated the integration of key scientific institutions and companies, enhancing the capabilities and resources of STC "Delta": Scientific institutes and companies entering into STC “Delta”

- Institute “Optics” (Optica)
- Grigol Tsulukidze Mining Institute;
- R. Dvali Machine – Mechanics Institute;
- F. Tavadze Metallurgy and Materials Science Institute;
- Micro and Nano Electronics Institute;
- Ilia Vekua Sokhumi Institute of Physics and Technology

In the years 2010 to 2011, the first Georgian armored carrier vehicle, Didgori, was created in two variations/modifications. The specifications of the Didgori armor are confidential, but it is acknowledged to offer defense against 7.62 mm armor-piercing rounds. The vehicle features a V-shaped hull, enhancing protection against landmines and IEDs, with claims suggesting it can withstand a 6 kg mine blast. The presence of an NBC protection system remains undisclosed. Developers assert that the overall protection of the vehicle surpasses STANAG 4569 Level 2 standards. During this period, LAZIKA (Georgian: ლაზიკა), first Georgian Infantry fighting vehicle, was also produced. It was developed by the Scientific Technical Center STC Delta.

During this period, there were several notable advancements in Georgia's military capabilities. In addition to the creation of the Didgori armored carrier vehicle and the LAZIKA infantry fighting vehicle, significant modernizations and innovations took place. These included the modernization of artillery systems and mortars, the production of the first Georgian Unmanned reconnaissance tactical aircraft, the modernized modification of the RPG-7 launcher.

=== Leaked diplomatic cables ===
According to the leaked diplomatic cables, the United States and NATO diplomats also expressed concerns over Akhalaia's appointment as Minister of Defense "noting his poor human rights record" during his service as the chief of penitentiary service. However, in the October 10, 2009 confidential cable sent to Alexander Vershbow, the U.S. Assistant Secretary of Defense, ahead of his visit to Georgia, the U.S. embassy in Tbilisi described Akhalaia as "the most active Defense Minister in terms of seeking advice" from the U.S. defense advisers and "then following through with it." He was further noted for being, unlike his predecessor, "unafraid to make decisions" and "genuinely interested in making reforms designed to make the GAF [the Georgian Armed Forces] better."

== Minister of Internal Affairs ==
On July 4, 2012, Akhalaia was appointed Minister of Internal Affairs, succeeding on this position Ivane Merabishvili, who became Prime Minister in an important cabinet reshuffle months before the scheduled parliamentary election.

== Arrest and conviction ==
After the change of power in Georgia in 2012, on November 5 he had returned back to Georgia and as he said was ready to answer all the questions about “absurd” and “idiotic” allegations voiced against him. It was the same day that an investigation was initiated following his return. Prior to his arrest on the subsequent day, Akhalia publicly announced his willingness to provide answers to all questions posed to him. He was arrested next day. In October 2013, He was found guilty in a trial over inhuman treatment of inmates in case related to 2006 Ortachala prison riot. However, then president Mikheil Saakashvili pardoned him in November 2013.During his pretrial detention, which endured for a period of 23 months, Akhalaia was acquitted in several cases. But he could not leave the prison because the pretrial detention was added to other cases in 2013 The first acquittal of Akhalaia in the court was followed by sharp reactions in the ruling team, the Georgian Dream Democratic Coalition's protest was left by the People's Party Chairman Koba Davitashvili.

When commenting on the acquittal, Gedevan Popkhadze, a member of the parliament from the ruling party, made the following comment to the media: “Whether he will be acquitted or not, Bacho Akhalaia should still be in prison.” Parliamentary Assembly of Council of Europe (PACE) adopted a resolution criticizing Georgia, along with Turkey and Russia, for “abuse of pretrial detention, the resolution brings an example of former Tbilisi Mayor Gigi Ugulava and ex-defense minister Bacho Akhalaia. In 2013, the Government of Georgia officially invited the OSCE Office for Democratic Institutions and Human Rights (OSCE/ODIHR) to monitor the trials of former high-ranking officials. According to the monitoring group: "During the period of ODIHR's trial monitoring, the media reported a number of public statements by high-ranking Georgian officials regarding potential prosecutions against the former President and other members of the political opposition, with some statements being possibly perceived as direct calls for prosecution. When asked about Bachana Akhalaia during an interview, then Prime Minister's advisor Gia Khukhashvili was quoted as saying "He must be given his due for his misdeeds and unspeakable offenses."

On 22 October 2014, the Tbilisi City Court sentenced Akhalaia to 7.5 years in prison on charges of torture and abuse of official powers. He was also deprived of the right to hold office for the term of 2 years and 3 months. According to the prosecutor, on January 12, 2006, the officers of Constitutional Security Department shot three young people with an unprecedented brutality near the Navtlughi bus terminal. In order to disguise it as the special operation, these people were unfairly declared as assaulters on prison. Bachana Akhalaia, who was a high-ranking government official at that time, ordered and directly participated in severely torturing six inmates in order to get from them a favourable testimony that murdered people were planning an armed attack on prison for the purpose of a mass escape of prisoners.Regarding this case, Akhalaia's lawyer Malkhaz velijanashvili, stated that this is a completely illegal and unsubstantiated verdict, there was no evidence in the case. Akhalaia was also found guilty in providing privileged prison conditions for the persons convicted on Sandro Girgvliani murder case.

On 23 April 2018, the court sentenced Akhalaia to 9 years in prison for torture, causing death of colonel Sergo Tetradze in 2011. However, Akhalaia did not agree with the court's decision even after his release following 10 years of imprisonment, labeling it a politically motivated injustice. In addition to presenting his position in court, Akhalaia commented on Sergo Tetradze’s case in the Shabat Kurieri TV program from the so-called Matrosov prison. He stated that Tetradze was considered a Russian spy and was meant to be exchanged for Georgians who were imprisoned in Russia at the time for espionage in favor of Georgia. According to Akhalaia, logically, there should have been no pressure on Tetradze. He emphasized that Tetradze's death was completely unexpected and that he should have been kept in the best possible conditions since negotiations for his exchange were nearly finalized person who was detained was not only supposed to be protected from any pressure, but he should have been kept in privileged conditions. He was supposed to be exchanged for prisoners who were in Russian prisons at the time," Akhalaia stated. He also mentioned that he personally had questions about the circumstances of Sergo Tetradze’s death: "A person involved in such a significant case, who was not supposed to face any harm, is said to have died of a heart attack. Questions remain," he said.

Akhalaia did not attend the court session where the verdict was announced. Instead, he issued a statement from prison, categorically rejecting the court's decision and calling it "offensive." In 2018, a secret audio recording was released featuring a conversation between Mirza Subeliani, a former senior official of the Georgian Ministry of Justice, and Viktor Japaridze, a Member of Parliament from the ruling Georgian Dream party. The recording, made while Subeliani was in prison, captures him stating that he personally and systematically tortured and pressured witnesses to obtain testimony against Bacho Akhalaia in the Navtlughi and Tetradze cases. He also claims to have coerced criminal figures known as "thieves-in-law" into testifying against Akhalaia in court.

Subsequently, the prosecutor's office released another recording, also featuring Subeliani’s voice, in which he appears to suggest that he is willing to fabricate allegations against the authorities in exchange for his release from prison.

Ani Nadareishvili, Bacho Akhalaia’s wife and legal representative, commented on the matter, stating that "it was very emotional for Bacho to finally see the public learning that he was serving an unjust sentence and that the testimonies against him had been obtained through the torture of witnesses and the suffering of individuals." However, she expressed skepticism that these allegations would be objectively investigated while the current government remained in power, as the actions in question were allegedly carried out under its direction. During his imprisonment, Akhalaia authored the book "Sukhumi. My Jerusalem". The book delves into the dynamics of occupied territories and the prevailing socio-political situation in the country. He also translated several notable books during his time in prison, including "The Art of War" by Martin Van Creveld, "Supreme Command" by Eliot Cohen, "Why Nations Fail" by Daron Acemoglu and James Robinson, and "Crises" by Henry Kissinger. These translated works, delving into political-military discourse, were edited by Bacho Akhalaia. He also translated. "Truth About the Mafia” by Judge Giovanni Falcone. Nowadays, he is actively involved in producing the first Georgian translation and commentary of Carl von Clausewitz's "On War.

Akhalaia left prison in March 2022. He spent 9 years and 3 months in solitary confinement. He has said that he did not plan to return to politics.

Preceded by Vasil Sikharulidze	Minister of Defense of Georgia; 2009–2012	Succeeded by Dimitri Shashkin
Preceded by Vano Merabishvili	Minister of Internal Affairs of Georgia; 2012	Succeeded by Ekaterina Zguladze; Acting
