= Ministry of Defence of Georgia =

Government ministry of Georgia

- საქართველოს თავდაცვის სამინისტრო
- Coat of arms of Georgia

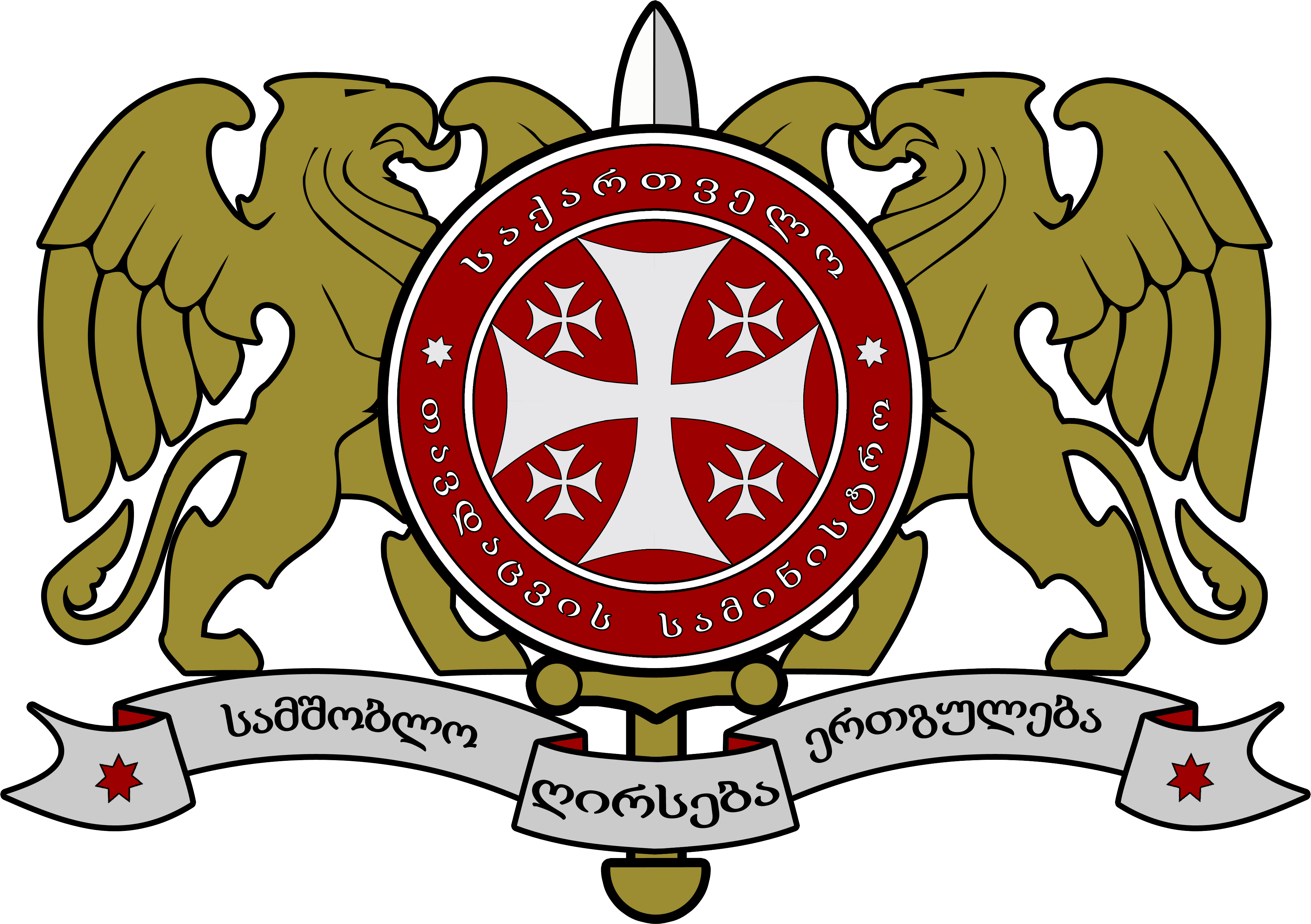
- Emblem of the Ministry of Defence of Georgia

Agency overview
- Formed: 1991
- Jurisdiction: Government of Georgia
- Headquarters: General Kvinitadze Str. N20, Tbilisi, Georgia 0112
- Annual budget: ₾1.3 billion in 2023 ($489.7 million)
- Minister responsible: Irakli Chikovani, Minister of Defence
- Website: www.mod.gov.ge

The Ministry of Defence of Georgia (Georgian: საქართველოს თავდაცვის სამინისტრო, sakartvelos tavdatsvis saministro) is the Georgian government ministry in charge of the Defence Forces of Georgia and regulating activities in defence of the country from external threats, preserving territorial integrity and waging wars on behalf of Georgia. The Minister of Defence is appointed and removed from the post by the Prime Minister of Georgia. The ministry is currently headed by Irakli Chikovani.

== History ==
In the midst of dissolution of Soviet Union and political turmoil in Georgia in late 1980s, the Georgian military played an important role in the struggle for and retaining power. In November 1992, the Parliament of Georgia passed a law creating the Council for National Security and Defence. The council reported all its activities to parliament but was directly subordinate to the head of state and commander in chief of the armed forces. Eduard Shevardnadze was then appointed the Council Chairman. Georgian politicians Jaba Ioseliani and Tengiz Kitovani were appointed deputy chairmen by Shevardnadze while Tedo Japaridze, the Georgian MFA expert on the United States became the chairman's aide. The council had the full right to issue binding resolutions on military and security matters of Georgia. In May 1993, Ioseliani and Kitovani were relieved of their duties in the council and disbanded of their government power bases, allowing Shevardnadze to assume greater power.

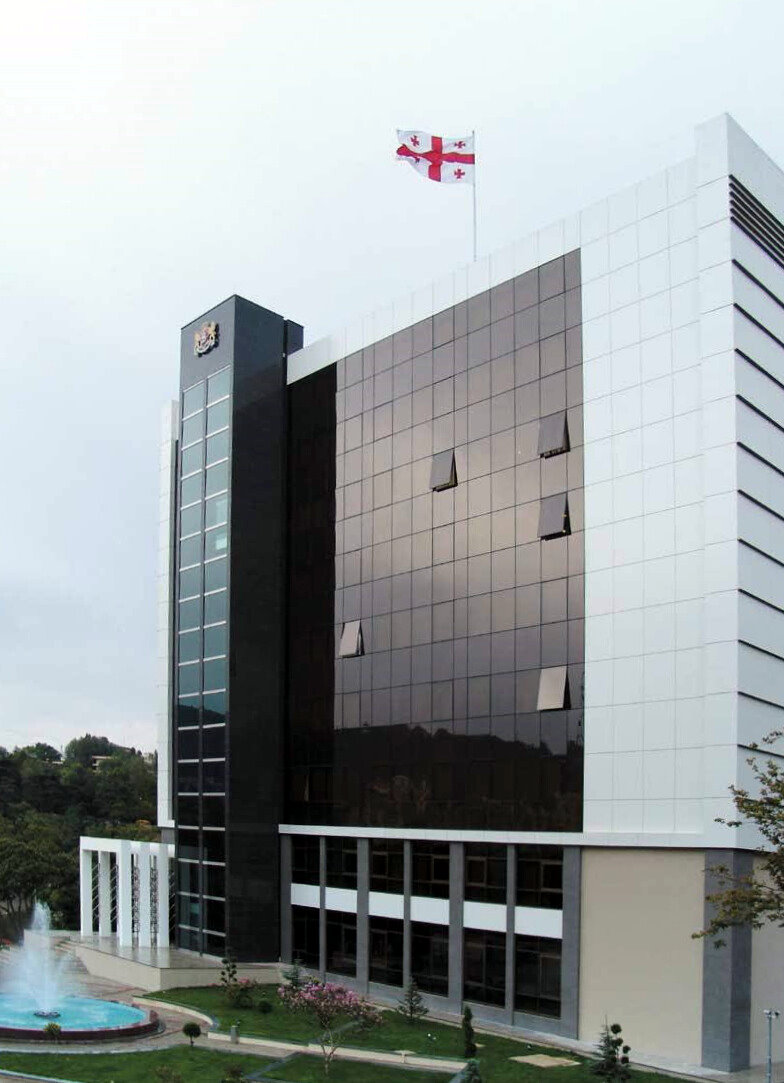
Ministry of Defence headquarters in Tbilisi

The Ministry of Defence was established in 1991. When the Soviet Union ceased to exist, Georgia was able to retain only a few military assets of the Soviet Army stationed in the Georgian SSR with modest amounts of military equipment, most of them obsolescent. Due to the Georgian Civil War, the Georgian military shrank and was limited in resources. Lack of financial resources forced the Georgian government to allocate less money to defence with the defence budget being as little as GEL 55 million ($36.7 million) in 1999. There was also lack of coordination between seven independent armed forces which existed in Georgia in 1999, among them the Armed Forces, National Guard of Georgia, Border Guards, Interior Troops, Independent Assault Brigade, Police Special Duties Unit and Special Service for the Protection of the State (SSPS).

By 2005, the Georgian government had consolidated the seven branches of the defence forces. The National Guard and the Independent Assault Brigade were incorporated into the Georgian Armed Forces under the Ministry of Defence, the Border Guards and Police Special Duties Unit were subordinated to the Ministry of Internal Affairs. The number of active duty personnel in the Armed Forces was reduced to 15,000. As a part of Georgian foreign and security policy, the government has been aiming towards progressive integration into European and Euro-Atlantic political, economic, and security structures. The State Ministry for Euro-Atlantic Integration was also created as a part of this process.

According to the amendment to the law on "Approval of the Number of Georgian Military Forces", passed on 15 July 2007, the number of military servicemen in the Georgian Military was increased by 5,000 servicemen, bringing the total number to 37,000 military servicemen.

== Subordinate Institutions/Units ==
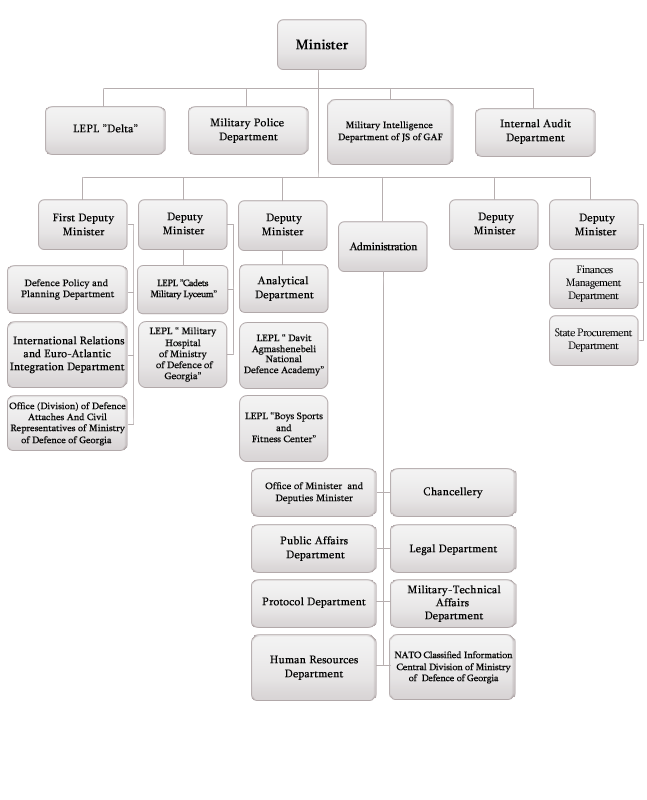
Georgia MoD structure

The ministry is headed by the Minister, aided by the First Deputy and two Deputy Ministers. It consists of four main departments:

- State Military Scientific-Technical Centre "Delta"
- Military Police Department
- General Inspection
- Military Intelligence Department.

The institutions subordinated to the ministry are:

- State Hydrographic Service
- Cadets Military Lyceum of Georgia
- Krtsanisi National Training Centre
- Sachkhere Mountain Training School

== Budget ==
The budget of the Ministry of Defence in 1999 was GEL 55 million ($36.7 million). By 2023, the ministry's budget is GEL 1.3 billion (USD 489.7 million), compared to GEL 1.1 billion (USD 414.3 million) in 2022 (increased rate by USD 75.4 million).

== See also ==
- Minister of Defence of Georgia
- Cabinet of Georgia
- Defence Forces of Georgia
- Chief of General Staff of Georgian Armed Forces
