= 13th "Shavnabada" Light Infantry Battalion =

13th Light Infantry Battalion
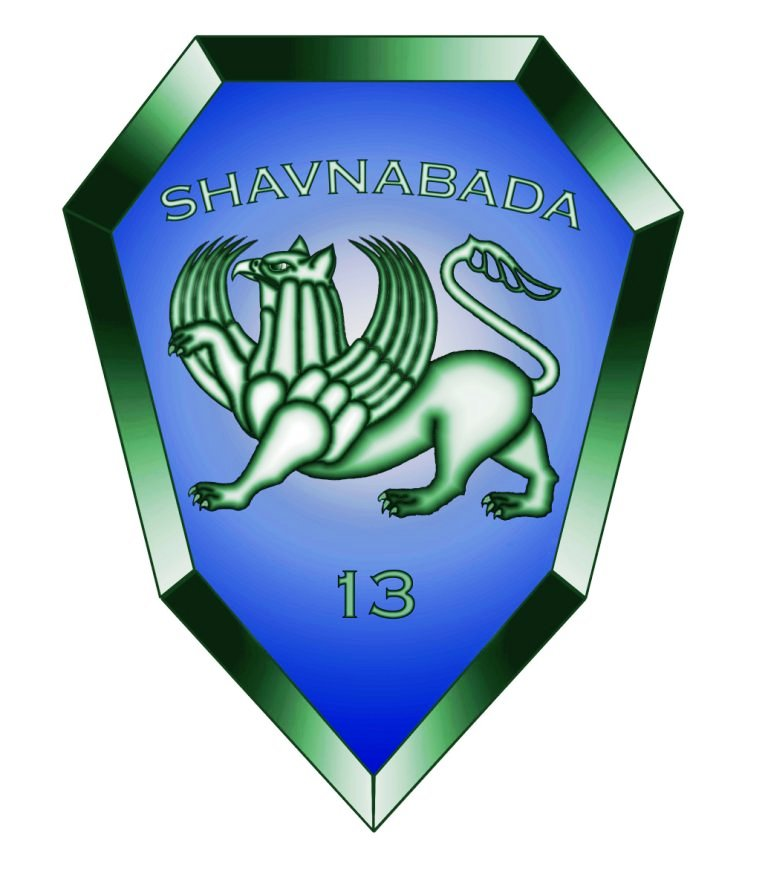
- 13th "Shavnabada" Light Infantry Battalion Shoulder Sleeve Insignia.
- Active: January 7, 1992 –
- Country: Georgia
- Branch: Georgian Land Forces
- Type: Light infantry
- Size: ~400-600
- Part of: Joint Staff of the Armed Forces of Georgia (JSAFG); Georgian Land Forces; 1st Infantry Brigade (1BDE)
- Nickname: Shavnabada
- Motto: Be a man among men ("იყავი კაცი კაცებს შორის")
- Anniversaries: July 2
- Engagements: Abkhazia, 1992-93; South Ossetia, 1992; South Ossetia, 2004; Operation Iraqi Freedom 2005, 2008; War in Afghanistan, since 2009

Commanders
- Current commander: N/A
- Notable commanders: Colonel Akia Barbakadze; Major General Koba Kobaladze; Colonel Giorgi Shengelia

The 13th "Shavnabada" Light Infantry Battalion (Georgian: მე-13 "შავნაბადა"-ს მსუბუქი ქვეითი ბატალიონი) also known as the (official name) 13th Light Infantry Battalion (formerly the 113th Mechanized Infantry Battalion) is a one of three light infantry battalion unit in 1st Infantry Brigade of the Operational Command East, so named for a type of cloak worn by medieval warriors. The most famous cloak is said to have worn by the patron saint of Georgia, Saint George, when he, according to a legend, appeared to lead Georgian army to a victory. The battalion's crest includes the word "Shavnabada" in Georgian, the battalion's symbol, the Griffin, and the number "13".

The "Shavnabada" Light Infantry Battalion was established with the independence of Georgia from the Soviet Union in 1991. It saw combat in Abkhazia in the course of the 1992-93 war conducting an amphibious assault against Gagra from the Black Sea. In 2003, the battalion received Georgia Train and Equip Program (GTEP) from the U.S. Marine Corps.

More than 90 percent of the soldiers served in Iraq (Operation Iraqi Freedom) in 2005 with the United States Army's 3rd Infantry Division in the Green Zone of Baghdad. Veterans of that deployment in Baghdad's Green Zone with the U.S. Army's 3rd Infantry Division wear the 3ID's famous division patch on their right shoulders. It is a point of considerable pride in the Georgian Army to be one of those members who fought alongside the 3ID in Baghdad. Many are also veterans of fighting a guerrilla insurgency in the South Ossetia region of the country in October 2004. From 2010 to 2011, the battalion served as part of ISAF in Helmand, Afghanistan.
