= List of wars involving South Ossetia =

This is a list of wars involving the disputed South Ossetia.

Conflict	Combatant 1	Combatant 2	Results	Casualties
Georgian–Ossetian conflict (1918–20)	Ossetian insurgents Supported by: Russian SFSR	Georgia	Georgian victory	4,812–5,279 dead, unknown wounded
South Ossetia war (1991–1992)	South Ossetia; Russia	Georgia	Victory	Several hundreds dead
East Prigorodny Conflict (October 30, 1992 –November 6, 1992)	(North Ossetia–Alania) North Ossetian militia and security forces (North Ossetia–Alania) North Ossetian Republican Guard (South Ossetia) South Ossetian militia Don Cossacks; Terek Cossacks (Russia) Russian Army; 9th Motor Rifle Division; 76th Guards Air Assault Division	Ingush militia	Victory	192 dead, 379 wounded
South Ossetian clashes (2004)	South Ossetia; Russia	Georgia	Inconclusive	7 dead
Russo-Georgian War (7–12 August 2008)	Russia; South Ossetia; Abkhazia	Georgia	Victory	365 dead
Russo-Ukrainian war (2022–present)	Russia; Belarus; North Korea; South Ossetia	Ukraine	Ongoing	98 dead (as of 22 June 2026)
