= Counterterrorism =

Activity to defend against or prevent terrorist actions

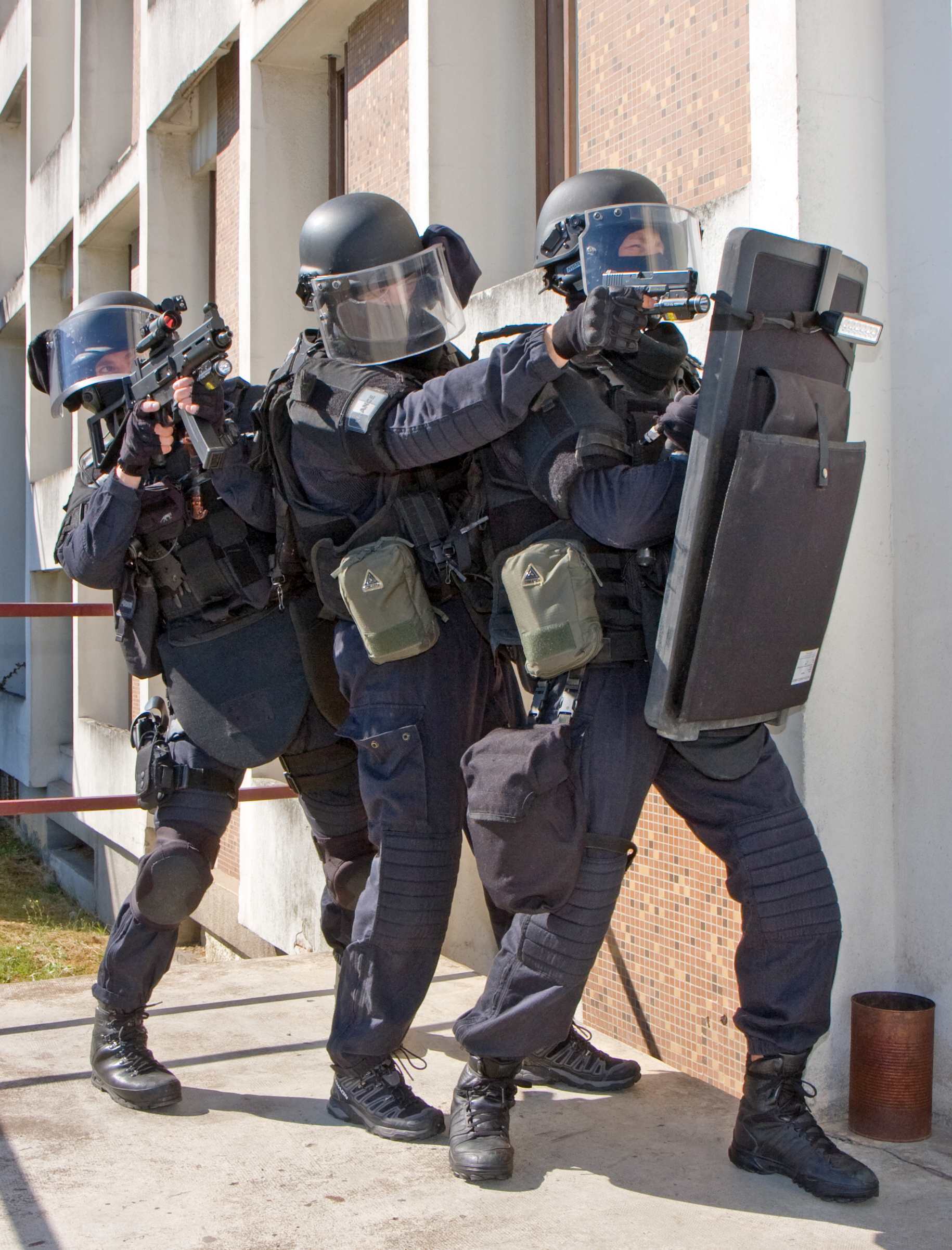
GIGN operators in 2015. GIGN is the counterterrorist tactical unit of the National Gendarmerie of France.

Counterterrorism, also spelled counter-terrorism and sometimes referred to as anti-terrorism, encompasses the laws, policies, and operational measures used to prevent, deter, and respond to terrorism. These efforts involve a range of tactics and strategies employed by governments, law-enforcement agencies, intelligence services and, in some contexts, private-sector organisations.

When acts of terrorism occur within a broader insurgency—an activity that some definitions of terrorism include—counterterrorism efforts may incorporate counterinsurgency measures.

== History ==
The first dedicated counterterrorism unit was the Special Irish Branch of the Metropolitan Police, established in 1883 to counter the Fenian bombing campaign. It was later renamed the Special Branch as its remit expanded beyond Irish republican activity. Police forces across the United Kingdom and in other countries subsequently created similar units.

The International Conference of Rome for the Social Defense Against Anarchists, held in 1898, is widely regarded as the first international conference convened to address terrorism, bringing together 54 delegates from 21 countries to coordinate measures against anarchist violence.

The first modern police tactical counterterrorism unit is widely considered to be GSG 9, established within West Germany's Federal Border Guard (Bundesgrenzschutz), on 26 September 1972 in response to the Munich Olympic massacre. The Bundesgrenzschutz was later reorganised as the Federal Police (Bundespolizei) in 2005, with GSG 9 continuing as its elite counterterrorism and hostage‑rescue unit.

Counterterrorist capabilities expanded during the late twentieth century as governments responded to a perceived rise in terrorist activity. After the September 11 attacks in 2001, Western governments made counterterrorism a central national‑security priority, introducing major institutional reforms, increasing international cooperation, and adopting new operational approaches such as red team analysis and a wider range of preventive measures.

Although terrorist attacks in Western countries tend to receive disproportionately high levels of media coverage, most terrorist incidents occur in less developed regions. Scholars have noted that government responses to terrorism can sometimes produce unintended consequences, including operational failures or escalation of violence. The failed rescue attempt during the Munich massacre is a widely cited example, prompting major reforms in crisis‑response capabilities.

== Planning ==
=== Intelligence, surveillance, and reconnaissance ===
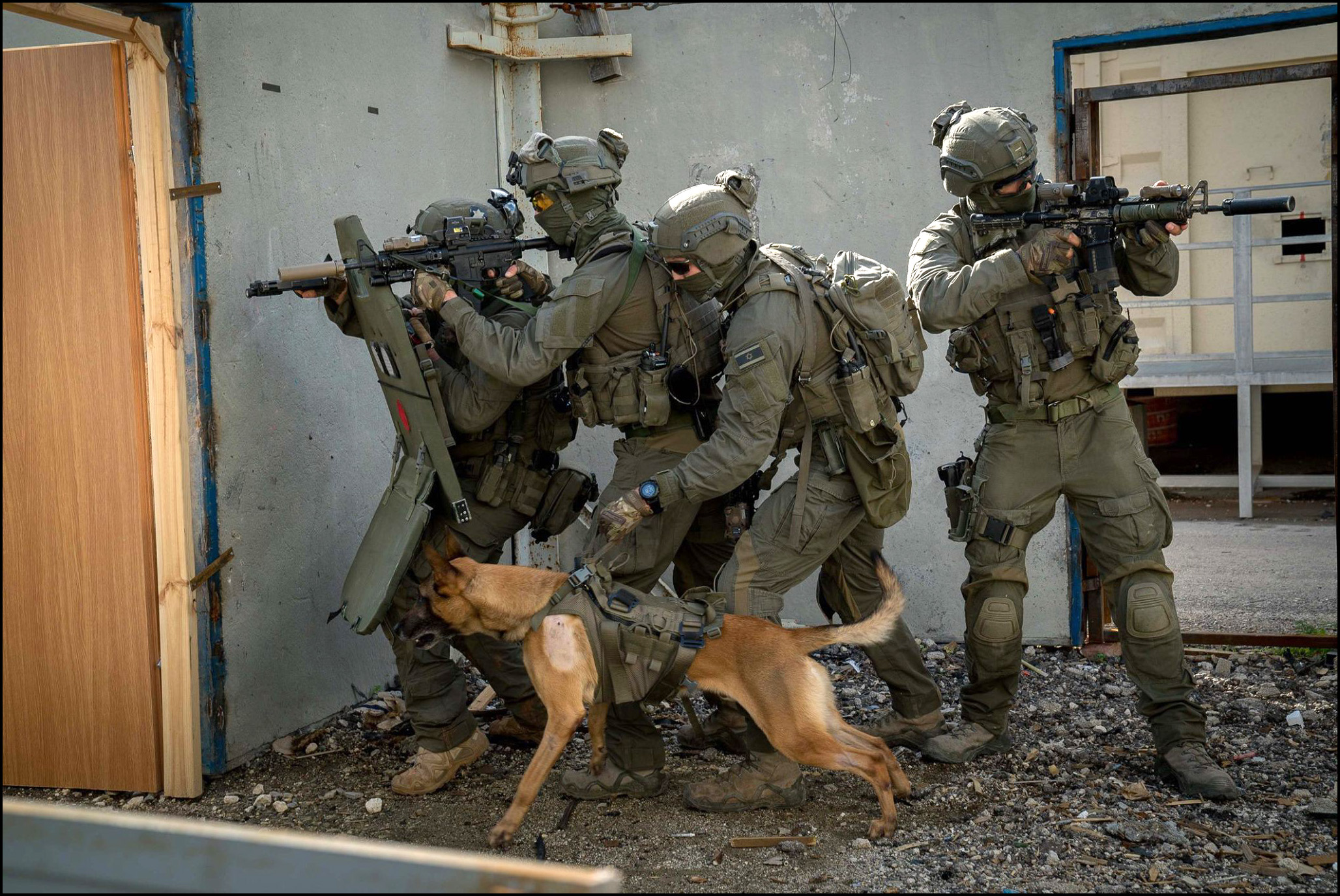
Yamam, one of Israel's counterterrorism units

Most counterterrorism strategies involve an increase in policing and domestic intelligence gathering. Central techniques include intercepting communications and location tracking. New technology has expanded the range of military and law enforcement options for intelligence gathering. Many countries increasingly employ facial recognition systems in policing.

Domestic intelligence gathering is sometimes directed to specific ethnic or religious groups, which are the sources of political controversy. Mass surveillance of an entire population raises objections on civil liberties grounds. Domestic terrorists, especially lone wolves, are often harder to detect because of their citizenship or legal status and ability to stay under the radar.

To select the effective action when terrorism appears to be more of an isolated event, the appropriate government organizations need to understand the source, motivation, methods of preparation, and tactics of terrorist groups. Rational judgement is at the heart of such preparation, as well as a political and social understanding of any grievances that might be solved. Ideally, one gets information from inside the group, which can be a very difficult challenge for human intelligence operations because operational terrorist cells are often small, with all members known to one another, perhaps even related.

Counterintelligence is considered a great challenge with the security of cell-based systems, since the ideal, but nearly impossible goal is to obtain a clandestine source within the cell. Financial tracking can play a role, as a communications intercept. However, both of these approaches must be balanced against legitimate expectations of privacy.

=== Legal contexts ===
In response to the growing legislation.

United Kingdom

- The United Kingdom has had counterterrorism legislation in place for more than thirty years. The Prevention of Violence Act 1938 was brought in response to an Irish Republican Army (IRA) campaign of violence under the S-Plan. This act had been allowed to expire in 1953. It was repealed in 1973 to be replaced by the Prevention of Terrorism Acts, a response to the Troubles in Northern Ireland. From 1974 to 1989, the temporary provisions of the act were renewed annually. Their original counterterrorism legislation was used to predict future IRA attacks and respond accordingly based on their predictions. For example, if British Security Forces attacked, they predicted the IRA would target civilian areas as a response.
- In 2000 the Acts were replaced with the more permanent Terrorism Act 2000, which contained many of their powers, and then the Prevention of Terrorism Act 2005.
- The Anti-terrorism, Crime and Security Act 2001 was formally introduced into the Parliament on November 19, 2001, two months after the September 11, 2001 attacks in the United States. It received royal assent and went into force on December 13, 2001. On December 16, 2004, the Law Lords ruled that Part 4 was incompatible with the European Convention on Human Rights. However, under the terms of the Human Rights Act 1998, it remained in force. The Prevention of Terrorism Act 2005 was drafted to answer the Law Lords ruling and the Terrorism Act 2006 creates new offenses related to terrorism, and amends existing ones. The act was drafted in the aftermath of the 7 July 2005 London bombings and, like its predecessors, some of its terms have proven to be highly controversial.

Since 1978 the UK's terrorism laws have been regularly reviewed by a security-cleared Independent Reviewer of Terrorism Legislation, whose often influential reports are submitted to Parliament and published in full.

United States

- U.S. legal issues surrounding this issue include rulings on the domestic employment of deadly force by law enforcement agencies.
- Search and seizure is governed by the Fourth Amendment to the United States Constitution.
- The U.S. passed the Patriot Act after the September 11 attacks, as well as a range of other legislation and executive orders relating to national security.
- The Department of Homeland Security was established to consolidate domestic security agencies to coordinate counterterrorism and national response to major natural disasters and accidents.
- The United States Coast Guard's mission, only military branch with law enforcement jurisdiction to board and seize "The direct or indirect supply, sale, or transfer of weapons to terrorist organizations violates U.N. Security Resolution 2216 (as extended and renewed by resolutions 2675 and 2707) and international law."
- The Posse Comitatus Act limits domestic employment of the United States Army and the United States Air Force, requiring Presidential approval before deploying the Army or the Air Force. Department of Defense policy also applies this limitation to the United States Marine Corps and the United States Navy, because the Posse Comitatus Act does not cover naval services, even though they are federal military forces. The Department of Defense can be employed domestically on Presidential order, as was done during the Los Angeles riots of 1992, Hurricane Katrina, and the Beltway Sniper incidents.
- External or international use of lethal force would require a Presidential finding.
- In February 2017, sources claimed that the Trump administration intends to rename and revamp the U.S. government program Countering Violent Extremism (CVE) to focus solely on Islamist extremism.

Australia

- Australia has passed several counterterrorism acts. In 2004, a bill comprising three acts Anti-terrorism Act, 2004, (No 2) and (No 3) was passed. Then Attorney-General, Philip Ruddock, introduced the Anti-terrorism bill, 2004 on March 31. He described it as "a bill to strengthen Australia's counter-terrorism laws in a number of respects – a task made more urgent following the recent tragic terrorist bombings in Spain." He said that Australia's counterterrorism laws "require review and, where necessary, updating if we are to have a legal framework capable of safeguarding all Australians from the scourge of terrorism." The Australian Anti-Terrorism Act 2005 supplemented the powers of the earlier acts. The Australian legislation allows police to detain suspects for up to two weeks without charge and to electronically track suspects for up to a year. The Australian Anti-Terrorism Act of 2005 included a "shoot-to-kill" clause. In a country with entrenched liberal democratic traditions, the measures are controversial and have been criticized by civil libertarians and Islamic groups.

Israel

- Israel monitors a list of designated terrorist organizations and has laws forbidding membership in such organizations and funding or helping them.
- On December 14, 2006, the Israeli Supreme Court ruled targeted killings were a permitted form of self-defense.
- In 2016 the Israeli Knesset passed a comprehensive law against terrorism, forbidding any kind of terrorism and support of terrorism, and setting severe punishments for terrorists. The law also regulates legal efforts against terrorism.

=== Human rights ===
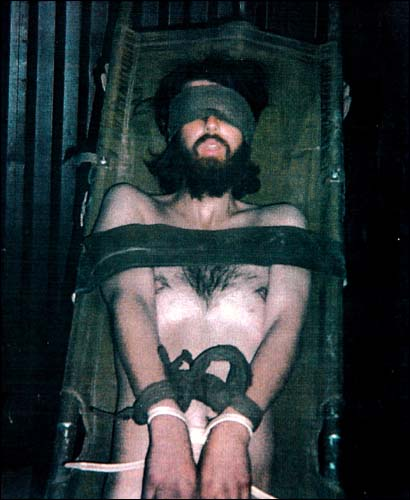
John Walker Lindh was captured as an enemy combatant during the United States' 2001 invasion of Afghanistan.

One of the primary difficulties of implementing effective counterterrorist measures is the waning of civil liberties and individual privacy that such measures often entail, both for citizens of, and for those detained by states attempting to combat terror. At times, measures designed to tighten security have been seen as abuses of power or even violations of human rights.

Examples of these problems can include prolonged, incommunicado detention without judicial review or long periods of 'preventive detention'; risk of subjecting to torture during the transfer, return and extradition of people between or within countries; and the adoption of security measures that restrain the rights or freedoms of citizens and breach principles of non-discrimination. Examples include:

- In November 2003, Malaysia passed new counterterrorism laws, widely criticized by local human rights groups for being vague and overbroad. Critics claim that the laws put the fundamental rights of free expression, association, and assembly at risk. Malaysia persisted in holding around 100 alleged militants without trial, including five Malaysian students detained for alleged terrorist activity while studying in Karachi, Pakistan.
- In November 2003, a Canadian-Syrian national, Maher Arar, publicly alleged that he had been tortured in a Syrian prison after being handed over to the Syrian authorities by the U.S.
- In December 2003, Colombia's congress approved legislation that would give the military the power to arrest, tap telephones, and carry out searches without warrants or any previous judicial order.
- Images of torture and ill-treatment of detainees in U.S. custody in Iraq and other locations have encouraged international scrutiny of U.S. operations in the war on terror.
- Hundreds of foreign nationals remain in prolonged indefinite detention without charge or trial in Guantánamo Bay, despite international and U.S. constitutional standards some groups believe outlaw such practices.
- Hundreds of people suspected of connections with the Taliban or Al-Qaeda remain in long-term detention in Pakistan or in U.S.-controlled centers in Afghanistan without trial.
- China has used the "war on terror" to justify its policies in the predominantly Muslim Xinjiang Uyghur Autonomous Region to stifle Uyghur identity.
- In Morocco, Saudi Arabia, Tunisia, Yemen, and other countries, scores of people have been arrested and arbitrarily detained in connection with suspected terrorist acts or links to opposition armed groups.
- Until 2005, eleven men remained in high security detention in the UK under the Anti-Terrorism, Crime and Security Act 2001.
- United Nations experts condemned the misuse of counterterrorism powers by the Egyptian authorities following the arrest, detention, and designation of human rights activists Ramy Shaath and Zyad El-Elaimy as terrorists. The two activists were arrested in June 2019, and the first-ever renewal of remand detention for Shaath came for the 21st time in 19 months on 24 January 2021. Experts called it alarming, and demanded the urgent implementation of the Working Group's opinion and removal of the two's names from the "terrorism entities' list.

Many argue that such violations of rights could exacerbate rather than counter the terrorist threat. Human rights activists argue for the crucial role of human rights protection as an intrinsic part to fight against terrorism. This suggests, as proponents of human security have long argued, that respecting human rights may indeed help us to incur security. Amnesty International included a section on confronting terrorism in the recommendations in the Madrid Agenda arising from the Madrid Summit on Democracy and Terrorism (Madrid March 8–11, 2005):

Democratic principles and values are essential tools in the fight against terrorism. Any successful strategy for dealing with terrorism requires terrorists to be isolated. Consequently, the preference must be to treat terrorism as criminal acts to be handled through existing systems of law enforcement and with full respect for human rights and the rule of law. We recommend: (1) taking effective measures to make impunity impossible either for acts of terrorism or for the abuse of human rights in counter-terrorism measures. (2) the incorporation of human rights laws in all anti-terrorism programs and policies of national governments as well as international bodies."

While international efforts to combat terrorism have focused on the need to enhance cooperation between states, proponents of human rights (as well as human security) have suggested that more effort needs to be given to the effective inclusion of human rights protection as a crucial element in that cooperation. They argue that international human rights obligations do not stop at borders, and a failure to respect human rights in one state may undermine its effectiveness in the global effort to cooperate to combat terrorism.

=== Preemptive neutralization ===
Some countries see preemptive attacks as a legitimate strategy. This includes capturing, killing, or disabling suspected terrorists before they can mount an attack. Israel, the United Kingdom, the United States, and Russia have taken this approach, while Western European states generally do not.

Another major method of preemptive neutralization is the interrogation of known or suspected terrorists to obtain information about specific plots, targets, the identity of other terrorists, whether or not the interrogation subjects himself is guilty of terrorist involvement. Sometimes more extreme methods are used to increase suggestibility, such as sleep deprivation or drugs. Such methods may lead captives to offer false information in an attempt to stop the treatment, or due to the confusion caused by it. In 1978 the European Court of Human Rights ruled in the Ireland v. United Kingdom case that such methods amounted to a practice of inhuman and degrading treatment, and that such practices were in breach of the European Convention on Human Rights Article 3 (art. 3).

==== Non-military ====
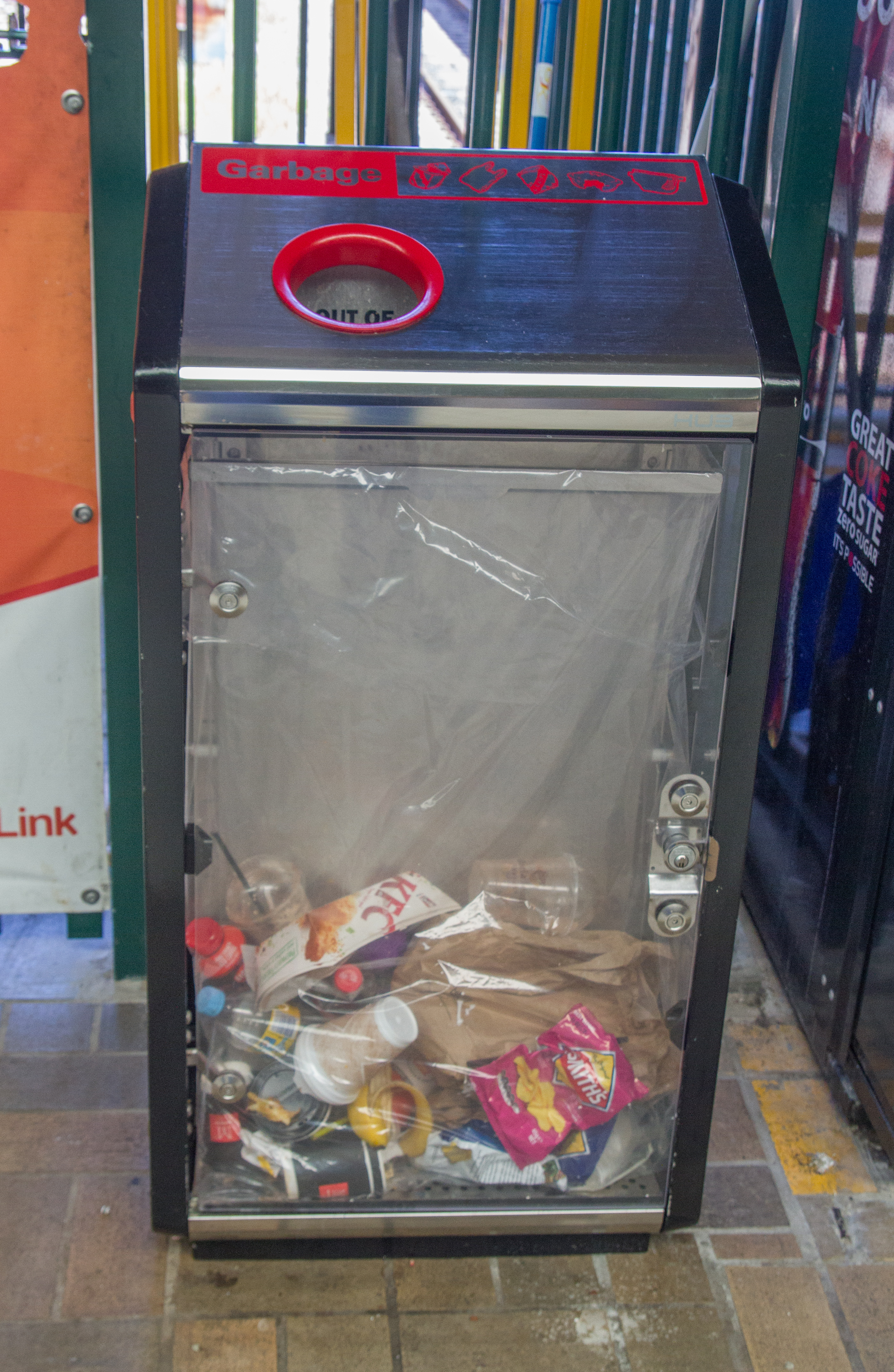
Transparent garbage bin installed at Central Station in Sydney, Australia. The bin's transparency allows police to easily examine its contents, discouraging the placement of bombs or weaponry inside.

The human security paradigm outlines a non-military approach that aims to address the enduring underlying inequalities which fuel terrorist activity. Causal factors need to be delineated and measures implemented which allow equal access to resources and sustainability for all people. Such activities empower citizens, providing "freedom from fear" and "freedom from want".

This can take many forms, including the provision of clean drinking water, education, vaccination programs, provision of food and shelter and protection from violence, military or otherwise. Successful human security campaigns have been characterized by the participation of a diverse group of actors, including governments, NGOs, and citizens.

Foreign internal defense programs provide outside expert assistance to a threatened government. FID can involve both non-military and military aspects of counterterrorism.

A 2017 study found that "governance and civil society aid is effective in dampening domestic terrorism, but this effect is only present if the recipient country is not experiencing a civil conflict."

==== Military ====
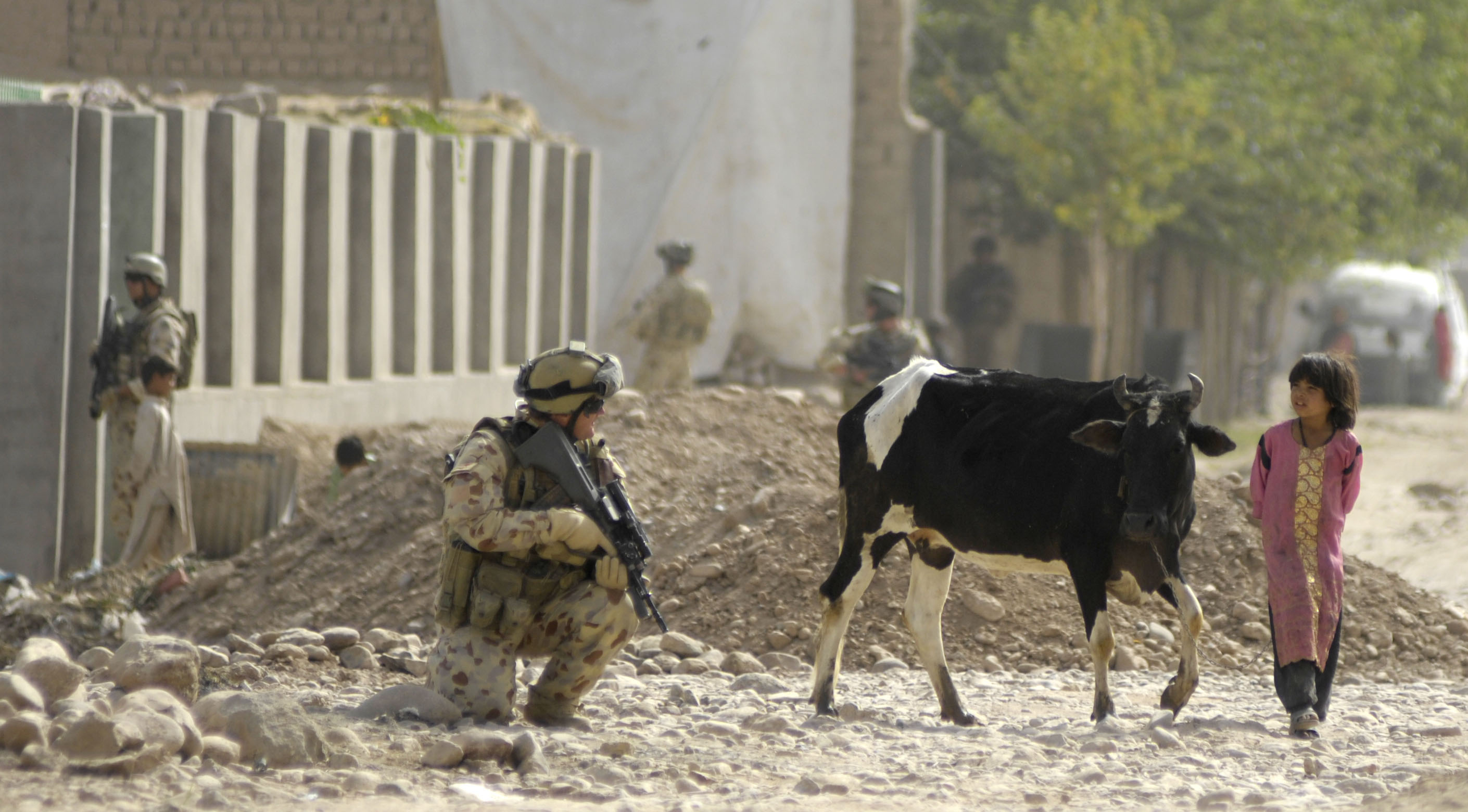
Australian Army soldiers under the International Security Assistance Force interacting with a civilian in Tarinkot, Afghanistan in 2008 during the War in Afghanistan, part of the war on terror

Terrorism has often been used to justify military intervention in countries where terrorists are said to be based. Similar justifications were used for the U.S. invasion of Afghanistan and the second Russian invasion of Chechnya.

Military intervention has not always been successful in stopping or preventing future terrorism, such as during the Malayan Emergency, the Mau Mau uprising, and most of the campaigns against the IRA during the Irish Civil War, the S-Plan, the Border Campaign, and the Troubles in Northern Ireland. Although military action can temporarily disrupt a terrorist group's operations temporarily, it sometimes does not end the threat completely.

Repression by the military in itself usually leads to short term victories, but tend to be unsuccessful in the long run (e.g., the French doctrine used in colonial Indochina and Algeria), particularly if it is not accompanied by other measures. However, new methods such as those taken in Iraq have yet to be seen as beneficial or ineffectual.

== Preparation ==
=== Target hardening ===
Whatever the target of terrorists, there are multiple ways of hardening the targets to prevent the terrorists from hitting their mark, or reducing the damage of attacks. One method is to place hostile vehicle mitigation to enforce protective standoff distance outside tall or politically sensitive buildings to prevent car bombings. Another way to reduce the impact of attacks is to design buildings for rapid evacuation.

Aircraft cockpits are kept locked during flights and have reinforced doors, which only the pilots in the cabin are capable of opening. UK railway stations removed their garbage bins in response to the Provisional IRA threat, as convenient locations for depositing bombs. Scottish stations removed theirs after the 7 July 2005 London Bombings as a precautionary measure. The Massachusetts Bay Transportation Authority purchased bomb-resistant barriers after the September 11 attacks.

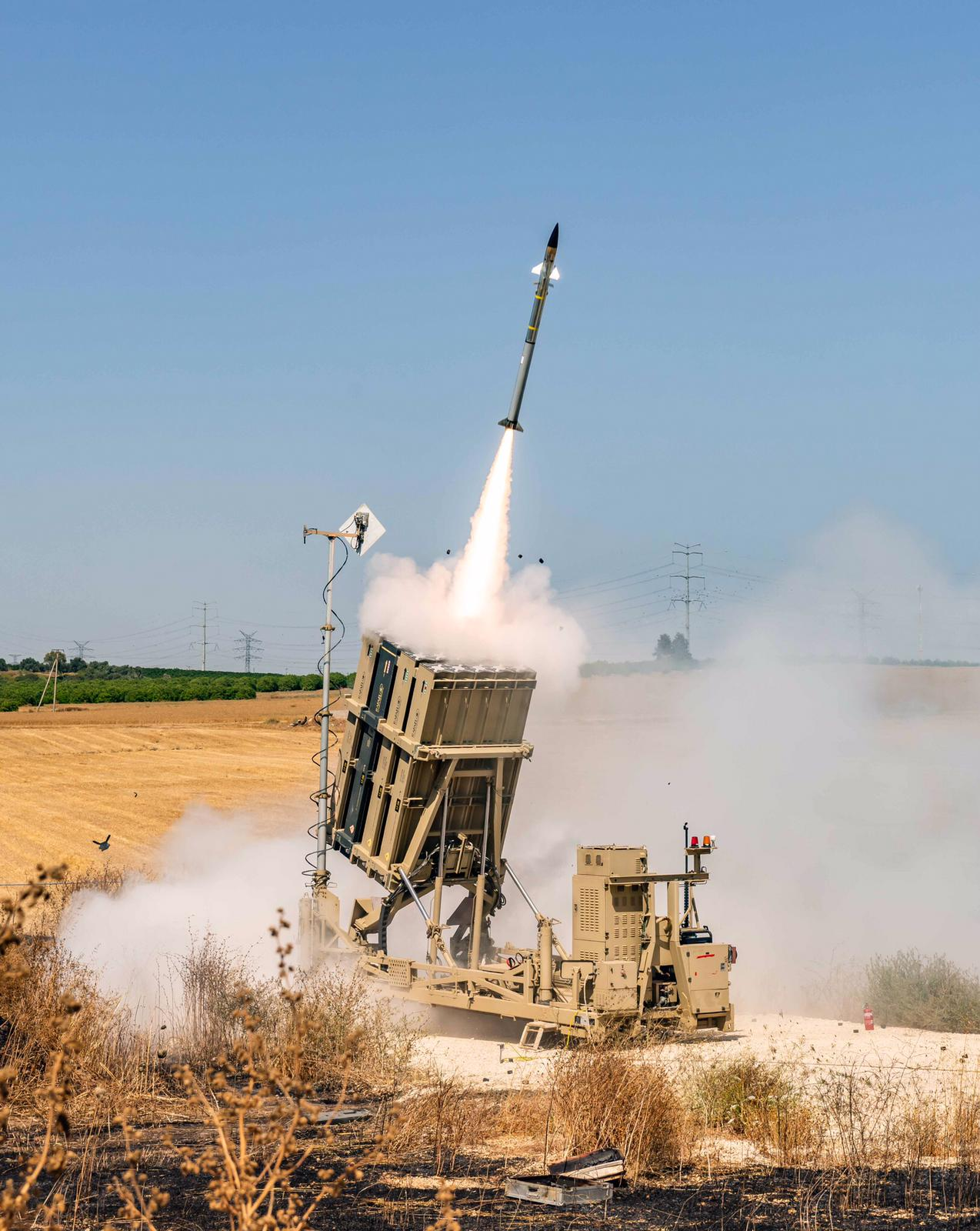
Israeli Iron Dome active protection system, capable of intercepting airborne rockets and artillery shells

Due to frequent shelling of Israel's cities, towns, and settlements by artillery rockets from the Gaza Strip (mainly by Hamas, but also by other Palestinian factions) and Lebanon (mainly by Hezbollah), Israel has developed several defensive measures against artillery, rockets, and missiles. These include building a bomb shelter in every building and school, but also deploying active protection systems such as the Arrow ABM, Iron Dome and David's Sling, which intercept the incoming threat in the air. Iron Dome has successfully intercepted hundreds of Qassam rockets and Grad rockets fired by Palestinians from the Gaza Strip.

A more sophisticated target-hardening approach must consider industrial and other critical industrial infrastructure that could be attacked. Terrorists do not need to import chemical weapons if they can cause a major industrial accident such as the Bhopal disaster or the Halifax Explosion. Industrial chemicals in manufacturing, shipping, and storage thus require greater protection, and some efforts are in progress.

Equipping likely targets with containers of pig lard has been used to discourage attacks by suicide bombers. The technique was apparently used on a limited scale by British authorities in the 1940s. The approach stems from the idea that Muslims perpetrating the attack would not want to be "soiled" by the lard in the moment before dying. The idea has been suggested more recently as a deterrent to suicide bombings in Israel. However, the actual effectiveness of this tactic is likely limited. A sympathetic Islamic scholar could issue a fatwa proclaiming that a suicide bomber would not be polluted by the swine products.

=== Command and control ===
For a threatened or completed terrorist attack, an Incident Command System (ICS) may be invoked to control the various services that may need to be involved in the response. ICS has varied levels of escalation, such as might be required for multiple incidents in a given area (e.g. 2005 London bombings or the 2004 Madrid train bombings), or all the way to a National Response Plan invocation if national-level resources are needed. For example, a national response might be required for a nuclear, biological, radiological, or significant chemical attack.

=== Damage mitigation ===
Fire departments, perhaps supplemented by public works agencies, utility providers, and heavy construction contractors, are most apt to deal with the physical consequences of an attack.

=== Local security ===
Again under an incident command model, local police can isolate the incident area, reducing confusion, and specialized police units can conduct tactical operations against terrorists, often using specialized counterterrorist tactical units. Bringing in such units will typically involve civil or military authority beyond the local level.

=== Medical services ===
Emergency medical services are capable of triaging, treating, and transporting the more severely affected individuals to hospitals, which typically have mass casualty and triage plans in place for terrorist attacks.

From the local to the national level, public health agencies may be designated to deal with identification or mitigation of possible biological attacks, including chemical or radiological contamination.

== Tactical units ==
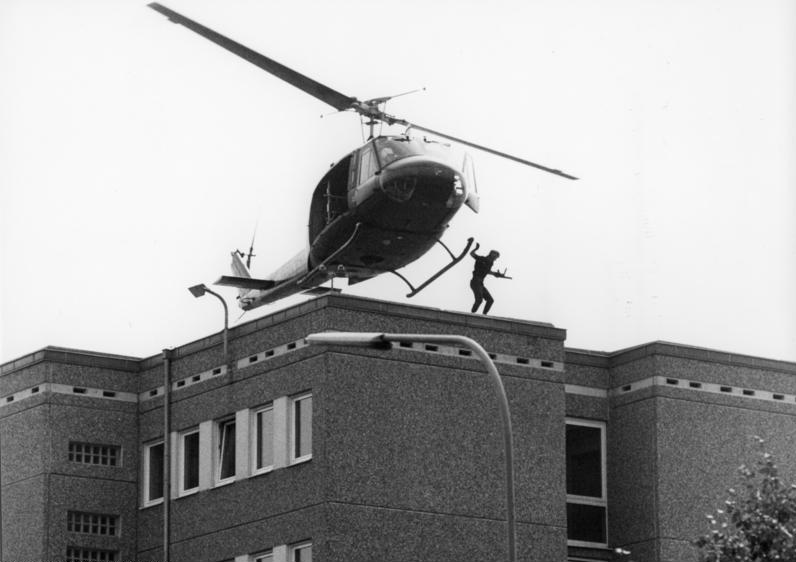
A GSG 9 operator during a 1978 training assault. Established in 1972, GSG 9 became one of the earliest dedicated counterterrorism tactical units

=== Counterterrorism agencies ===
Many countries have dedicated counterterrorist units trained to handle terrorist threats. Besides various security agencies, there are police tactical units whose role is to directly engage terrorists and prevent terrorist attacks. Such units perform both in preventive actions, hostage rescue, and responding to ongoing attacks. Countries of all sizes can have highly trained counterterrorist teams. Tactics, techniques, and procedures for manhunting are under constant development.

These units are specially trained in military tactics and are equipped for close-quarters combat, with emphasis on stealth and performing the mission with minimal casualties. The units include assault teams, snipers, EOD experts, dog handlers, and intelligence officers. Most of these measures deal with terrorist attacks that affect an area or threaten to do so, or are lengthy situations such as shootouts and standoffs that allow the counterterrorist units to assemble and respond; it is harder to deal with shorter incidents such as assassinations, reprisal attacks, or bombings due to the short warning time and the quick exfiltration of the perpetrators.

The majority of counterterrorism operations at the tactical level are conducted by state, federal, and national law enforcement or intelligence agencies. In some countries, the military may be called in as a last resort. For countries whose military is legally permitted to conduct domestic law enforcement operations, this is not an issue, and such counterterrorism operations are conducted by their military.

== Counterterrorist operations ==
Some counterterrorist actions of the 20th and 21st centuries are listed below. See list of hostage crises for a more extended list, including hostage-takings that did not end violently.

Representative counterterrorist operations
Incident		Main locale	Hostage nationality	Kidnappers /hijackers	Counterterrorist force	Results
1972	Sabena Flight 571	Tel Aviv-Lod International Airport, Israel	Mixed	Black September	Sayeret Matkal	2 hijackers killed, 1 passenger died from wounds during raid. 2 passengers and 1 commando injured. 2 kidnappers captured. All other 96 passengers rescued.
1972	Munich massacre	Munich, West Germany	Israeli	Black September	Bavarian State Police / Munich Police Department	All eleven hostages were killed during the Munich massacre, along with five of the kidnappers and one West German police officer; three kidnappers were captured but later released after the hijacking of Lufthansa Flight 615, whose perpetrators demanded their freedom. The failure of the rescue attempt by the Bavarian State Police, carried out by ordinary Munich Police Department officers, prompted West Germany to establish the dedicated federal counterterrorism unit GSG 9.
1975	AIA building hostage crisis	AIA building, Kuala Lumpur, Malaysia	Mixed. American and Swedish	Japanese Red Army	Special Actions Unit	All hostages released, all kidnappers flown to Libya.
1976	Operation Entebbe	Entebbe airport, Uganda	Israelis and Jews. Non-Jewish hostages were released shortly after capture.	PFLP	Sayeret Matkal, Sayeret Tzanhanim, Sayeret Golani	All 7 hijackers, 45 Ugandan troops, 3 hostages, and 1 Israeli soldier were killed. 100 hostages rescued
1977	Lufthansa Flight 181	Initially over the Mediterranean Sea, south of the French coast; subsequently Mogadishu International Airport, Somalia	Mixed	PFLP	GSG 9	The aircraft's captain was killed earlier in the hijacking; during the raid, three hijackers were killed, one was captured, and 91 hostages were rescued.
1980	Casa Circondariale di Trani Prison riot	Trani, Italy	Italian	Red Brigades	Gruppo di intervento speciale (GIS)	18 police officers rescued, all terrorists captured.
1980	Iranian Embassy siege	London, UK	Mostly Iranian but some British	Democratic Revolutionary Movement for the Liberation of Arabistan	22nd Special Air Service (SAS) Special Projects Team, part of the regiment's Counter Revolutionary Warfare (CRW) Wing	5 kidnappers killed, 1 kidnapper captured. 1 hostage killed prior to raid, 1 hostage killed by kidnapper during raid; 24 hostages rescued. 1 SAS operative received minor burns.
1979-1981	Iran hostage crisis	Tehran, Iran	Americans	Muslim Student Followers of the Imam's Line	United States Army Special Forces, Delta Force, 75th Infantry Regiment (Ranger), CIA Special Activities Division, 1st Special Operations Wing	8 US servicemen killed & 4 injured 1 Iranian civilian (alleged by Iranian Army) killed in Operation Eagle Claw. Negotiation finished in 1981. 53 hostages released.
1981	Garuda Indonesia Flight 206	Don Mueang Airport, Bangkok, Thailand	Mostly Indonesian, some Europeans/Americans	Komando Jihad	Kopassus assault group, RTAF securing perimeter	5 hijackers killed (2 likely killed extrajudicially after raid),1 Kopassus operative killed, 1 pilot fatally wounded by terrorist, all hostages rescued.
1982	Operation Winter Harvest	Padua, Italy	American	Red Brigades	U.S. Army Intelligence Support Activity (ISA), Delta Force and Nucleo Operativo Centrale di Sicurezza (NOCS)	Hostage saved, capture of the entire terrorist cell.
1983	Turkish embassy attack	Lisbon, Portugal	Turkish	Armenian Revolutionary Army	GOE	5 hijackers, 1 hostage, and 1 police officer killed, 1 hostage and 1 police officer wounded.
1985	Achille Lauro hijacking	MS Achille Lauro off the Egyptian coast	Mixed	Palestine Liberation Organization	U.S. military, Navy SEALs turned over to Italian special forces (Gruppo di intervento speciale)	1 hostage killed during hijacking, 4 hijackers convicted in Italy
1986	Pudu Prison siege	Pudu Prison, Kuala Lumpur, Malaysia	Two doctors	Prisoners	Special Actions Unit	6 kidnappers captured, 2 hostages rescued
1988	Mothers Bus	Hijacked between Beer Sheva and Dimona, Israel	11 passengers	Palestinian Liberation Organization	YAMAM	3 hijacker killed, 3 hostages killed, 8 hostages rescued
1993	Indian Airlines Flight 427	Hijacked between Delhi and Srinagar, India	141 passengers	Islamic terrorist (Mohammed Yousuf Shah)	National Security Guard	1 hijacker killed, all hostages rescued.
1994	Air France Flight 8969	Marseille, France	Mixed	Armed Islamic Group of Algeria	GIGN	4 hijackers killed. 3 hostages killed before the raid, 229 hostages rescued
1996	Japanese embassy hostage crisis	Lima, Peru	Japanese and guests (800+)	Túpac Amaru Revolutionary Movement	Peruvian military and police mixed forces	All 14 kidnappers, 1 hostage, and 2 rescuers killed.
1996	Mapenduma hostage crisis	Mapenduma, Indonesia	Mixed (19 Indonesians, 4 British, 2 Dutch, & 1 German)	Kelly Kwalik's Free Papua Movement (OPM) Group	Kopassus's SAT-81 Gultor CT Group, Kostrad's Infantry Battalion, Penerbad (Army Aviation) Mixed Forces	8 kidnappers killed, 2 kidnappers captured. 2 hostages killed by kidnappers, 24 hostages rescued. 5 soldiers killed in helicopter accident.
2000	Sauk Siege	Perak, Malaysia	Malaysian (2 police officers, 1 soldier and 1 civilian)	Al-Ma'unah	Grup Gerak Khas and 20 Pasukan Gerakan Khas, mixed forces	2 hostages, 2 rescuers, and 1 kidnapper killed. Other 28 kidnappers captured.
2001–2005	Pankisi Gorge crisis	Pankisi Gorge, Kakheti, Georgia		Mixed, Al-Qaeda and Chechen rebels led by Ibn al-Khattab	2,400 troops, 1,000 police officers	Terrorism threats in the gorge were repressed.
2002	Moscow theater hostage crisis	Moscow, Russia	Mixed, mostly Russian (900+)	Special Purpose Islamic Regiment	Spetsnaz	All 39 kidnappers and 129–204 hostages killed. 600–700 hostages freed.
2004	Beslan school siege	Beslan, North Ossetia-Alania, Russia	Russian	Riyad-us Saliheen	MVD (including OMON), Russian army (including Spetsnaz), Russian police (Militsiya)	334 hostages killed and hundreds wounded. 10–21 rescuers killed. 31 kidnappers killed, 1 captured.
2007	Siege of Lal Masjid	Islamabad, Pakistan		Students and Islamist Militia	Pakistan Army and Rangers, Special Service Group	91 students/militia members killed, 50 captured. 10 SSG and 1 Ranger killed; 33 SSG, 3 Rangers, 8 soldiers wounded. 204 civilians injured.
2007	Kirkuk Hostage Rescue	Kirkuk, Iraq	Turkman child	Islamic State of Iraq and Al Qaeda	PUK's Kurdistan Regional Government's Counter Terrorism Group	5 kidnappers arrested, 1 hostage rescued
2008	Operation Jaque	Colombia	Mixed	Revolutionary Armed Forces of Colombia	Columbian military	15 hostages rescued. 2 kidnappers captured
2008	Operations Dawn	Gulf of Aden, Somalia	Mixed	Somali pirates and militants	PASKAL and mixed international forces	Negotiation finished. 80 hostages released. RMN, including PASKAL navy commandos with mixed international forces patrolling the Gulf of Aden during this festive period.
2008	2008 Mumbai attacks	Multiple locations in Mumbai city	Indian Nationals, Foreign tourists	Ajmal Qasab and other Pakistani nationals affiliated to Laskar-e-taiba	National Security Guard, MARCOS, Mumbai Police, Rapid Action Force	141 Indian civilians, 30 foreigners, 15 police officers, and two NSG commandos were killed. 9 attackers killed, 1 attacker captured. 293 individuals injured
2009	Maersk Alabama hijacking	Gulf of Aden, Somalia.	23 crew	Somali pirates	U.S. Navy, SEAL Team Six	3 kidnappers killed and 1 captured. All hostages rescued.
2009	2009 Lahore Attacks	Multiple locations in Lahore city	Pakistan	Lashkar-e-Taiba	Police Commandos, Army Rangers Battalion	March 3, The Sri Lankan cricket team attack – 6 members of the Sri Lankan cricket team were injured, 6 Pakistani police officers and 2 civilians killed. March 30, the Manawan Police Academy in Lahore attack – 8 gunmen, 8 police personnel and 2 civilians killed, 95 people injured, 4 gunmen captured. Plaza Cinema Chowk attack – 16 police officers, an army officer and unknown number of civilians killed. As many as 251 people injured.
2011	Operation Dawn of Gulf of Aden	Gulf of Aden, Somalia	Koreans, Myanmar, Indonesian	Somali pirates and militants	Republic of Korea Navy Special Warfare Flotilla (UDT/SEAL)	4+ kidnappers killed or missing (Jan 18). 8 kidnappers killed, 5 captured. All hostages rescued.
2012	Lopota Gorge hostage crisis	Lopota Gorge, Georgia	Georgians	Ethnic Chechen, Russian, and Georgian militants	Special Operations Center, SOD, KUD, army special forces	2 KUD members and one special forces corpsman killed, 5 police officers wounded. 11 kidnappers killed, 5 wounded, and 1 captured. All hostages rescued.
2013	2013 Lahad Datu standoff	Lahad Datu, Sabah, Malaysia	Malaysians	Royal Security Forces of the Sultanate of Sulu and North Borneo (Jamalul Kiram III's faction)	Malaysian Armed Forces, Royal Malaysia Police, Malaysian Maritime Enforcement Agency and joint counterterrorist forces, Philippine Armed Forces	8 police officers (including 2 PGK commandos) and one soldier killed, 12 others wounded. 56 militants killed, 3 wounded, and 149 captured. All hostages rescued. 6 civilians killed and one wounded.
2017	2017 Isani flat siege	Isani district, Tbilisi, Georgia	Georgians	Chechen militants	State Security Service of Georgia, police special forces	3 militants killed, including Akhmed Chatayev. 1 special forces officer killed during skirmishes.
2024	Operation Golden Hand	Rafah, Gaza Strip	Israeli	Hamas	YAMAM and Shin Bet with support from the Israel Defense Forces	67–100+ Palestinians killed, all hostages rescued.

=== Designing counterterrorist systems ===
The scope for counterterrorism systems is very large in physical terms and in other dimensions, such as type and degree of terrorist threats, political and diplomatic ramifications, and legal concerns. Ideal counterterrorist systems use technology to enable persistent intelligence, surveillance and reconnaissance missions, and potential actions. Designing such a system-of-systems comprises a major technological project.

A particular design problem for counterterrorist systems is the uncertainty of the future: the threat of terrorism may increase, decrease or remain the same, the type of terrorism and location are difficult to predict, and there are technological uncertainties. A potential solution is to incorporate engineering flexibility into system design, allowing for flexibility when new information arrives. Flexibility can be incorporated in the design of a counter-terrorism system in the form of options that can be exercised in the future when new information is available.

=== Law enforcement ===
While some countries with longstanding terrorism problems have law enforcement agencies primarily designed to prevent and respond to terror attacks, in other nations, counterterrorism is a relatively more recent objective of law enforcement agencies.

Though some civil libertarians and criminal justice scholars have criticized efforts of law enforcement agencies to combat terrorism as futile and expensive or as threats to civil liberties, other scholars have analyzed the most important dimensions of the policing of terrorism as an important dimension of counter-terrorism, especially in the post-9/11 era, and have discussed how police view terrorism as a matter of crime control. Such analyses highlight the civilian police role in counterterrorism next to the military model of a war on terror.

==== American law enforcement ====
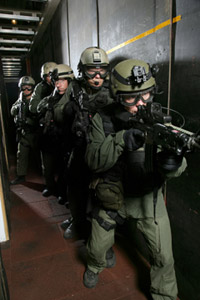
FBI Hostage Rescue Team agents

Pursuant to passage of the Homeland Security Act of 2002, federal, state, and local law enforcement agencies began to systemically reorganize. Two primary federal agencies, the Department of Justice (DOJ) and the Department of Homeland Security (DHS), house most of the federal agencies that are prepared to combat domestic and international terrorist attacks. These include the Border Patrol, the Secret Service, the Coast Guard and the FBI.

Following suit from federal changes pursuant to 9/11, however, most state and local law enforcement agencies began to include a commitment to "fighting terrorism" in their mission statements. Local agencies began to establish more patterned lines of communication with federal agencies. Some scholars have doubted the ability of local police to help in the war on terror and suggest their limited manpower is still best utilized by engaging community and targeting street crimes.

While counter-terror measures (most notably heightened airport security, immigrant profiling and border patrol) have been adapted during the last decade, to enhance counter-terror in law enforcement, there have been remarkable limitations to assessing the actual utility/effectiveness of law enforcement practices that are ostensibly preventative. Thus, while sweeping changes in counterterrorist rhetoric redefined most American post 9/11 law enforcement agencies in theory, it is hard to assess how well such hyperbole has translated into practice.

In intelligence-led policing (ILP) efforts, the most quantitatively amenable starting point for measuring the effectiveness of any policing strategy (i.e.: Neighborhood Watch, Gun Abatement, Foot Patrols, etc.) is usually to assess total financial costs against clearance rates or arrest rates. Since terrorism is such a rare event phenomena, measuring arrests or clearance rates would be a non-generalizable and ineffective way to test enforcement policy effectiveness. Another methodological problem in assessing counterterrorism efforts in law enforcement hinges on finding operational measures for key concepts in the study of homeland security. Both terrorism and homeland security are relatively new concepts for criminologists, and academicians have yet to agree on the matter of how to properly define these ideas in a way that is accessible.

=== Military ===
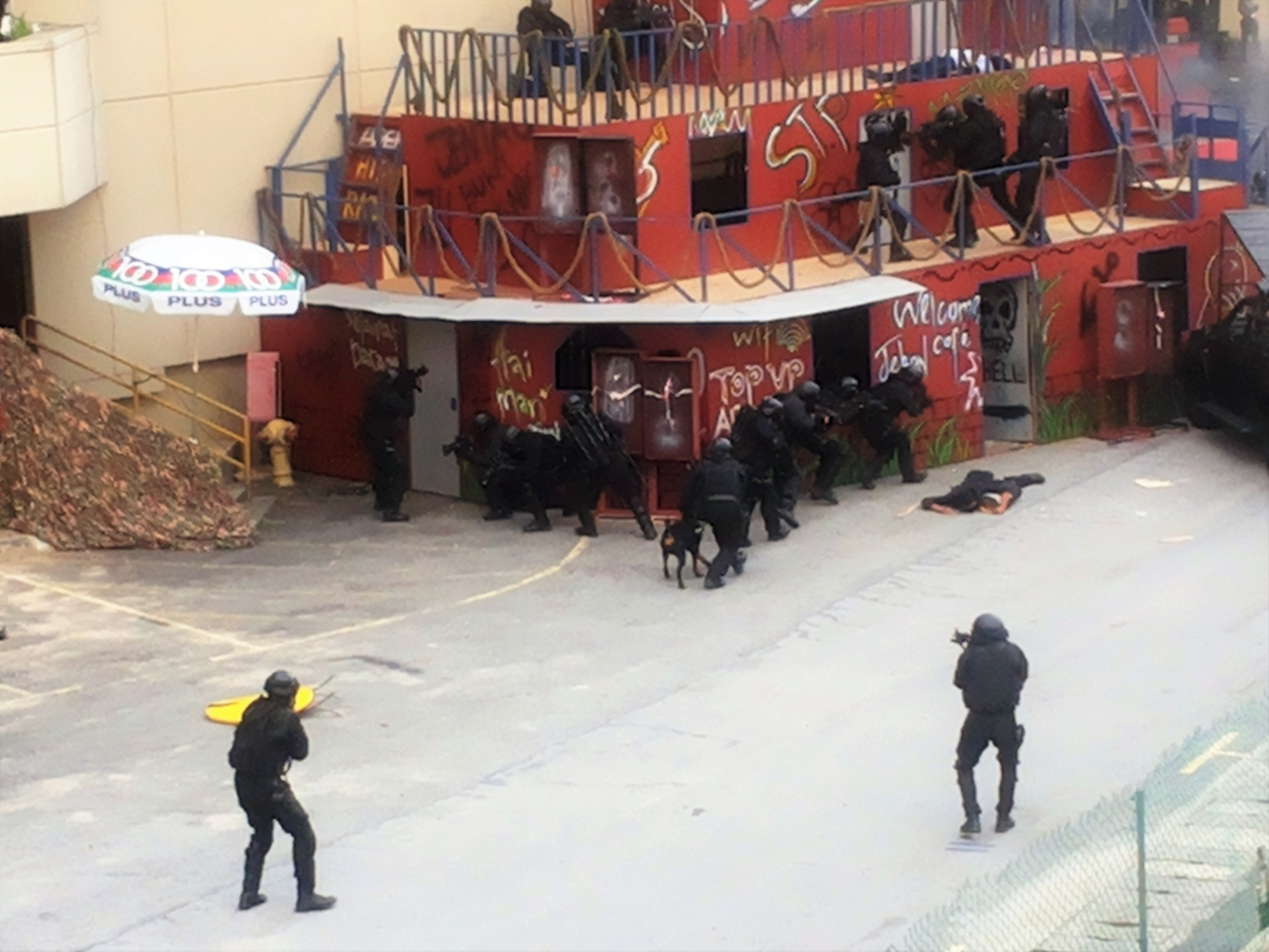
Malaysian Army Gerak Khas operatives during a training exercise in 2016

Given the nature of operational counterterrorism tasks, national military organizations do not generally have dedicated units whose sole responsibility is the prosecution of these tasks. Instead the counterterrorism function is an element of the role, allowing flexibility in their employment, with operations being undertaken in the domestic or international context.

In some cases the legal framework within which they operate prohibits military units conducting operations in the domestic arena; United States Department of Defense policy, based on the Posse Comitatus Act, forbids domestic counterterrorism operations by the U.S. military. Units allocated some operational counterterrorism tasks are frequently special forces or similar assets.

In cases where military organisations do operate in the domestic context, some form of formal handover from the law enforcement community is regularly required, to ensure adherence to the legislative framework and limitations. For instance, during the 1980 Iranian Embassy siege, the Metropolitan Police formally turned responsibility over to the British Army's Special Air Service when the situation went beyond police capabilities.

== See also ==
- Counterinsurgency
- Counter-IED efforts
- Counterjihad
- Deradicalization
- Explosive detection
- Extraordinary rendition
- Fatwa on Terrorism
- Global Initiative to Combat Nuclear Terrorism
- Industrial antiterrorism
- Infrastructure security
- International counter-terrorism operations of Russia
- Terrorism Research Center
