= Lopota incident =

2012 armed incident in Lopota, Georgia

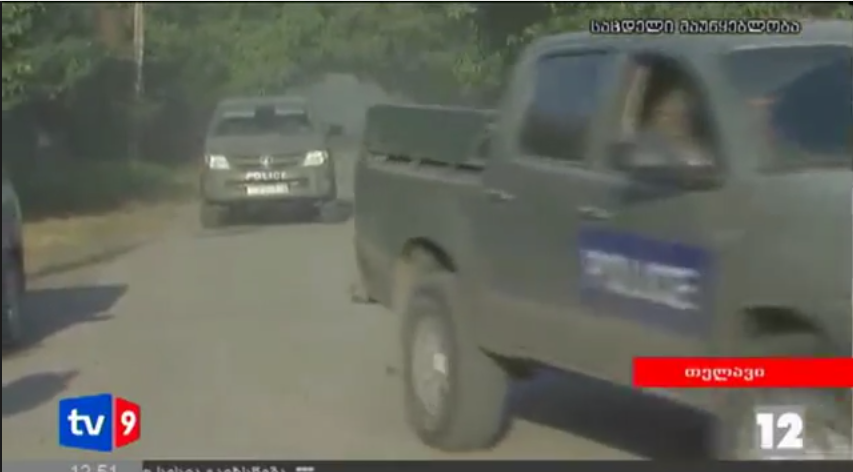
- A TV9 footage showing the Georgian police entering the Lopota Gorge
Date	August 28 – October 30, 2012
Location	Lopota, Telavi District, Kakheti, Georgia 42°6′27″N 45°39′51″E
Result	Georgian victory

Belligerents
(Georgia (country)) Georgia	Unknown

Commanders and leaders
Vano Merabishvili	Aslan Margoshvili †; Bahaud Aldamov †; Bahaud Bagakashvili †

Strength
Undisclosed	Estimated 17–20

Casualties and losses
3 killed, 5 wounded	Officially 11 killed, "several" wounded

The Lopota incident, known in Georgia as the special operation against an illegal armed group in Lopota (Georgian: შეიარაღებული დაჯგუფების დევნის ოპერაცია ლაფანყურში, romanized: sheiaraghebuli dajgupebis devnis op’eratsia lapanq’urshi), was an armed incident where the Georgian special forces engaged an unknown paramilitary group of about 17 unknown individuals (7 of them would later be identified after the incident, see the Identities section) which had allegedly taken several people hostage in the remote Caucasus gorge of Lopota near the border between Georgia and the Russia's Republic of Dagestan.

At first, the gunmen were widely believed to be Russian Islamist insurgents from Dagestan, however several other theories suggest that they may be local Islamist militants from the Pankisi Gorge.

To this day, there is no definitive answer to the paramilitary group's identity, and the likelihood of their identity has remained classified by Georgian officials.

During the operation, which began on August 28, 2012, at least 14 people were killed and at least six wounded in a firefight on August 29. Among the victims were 11 members of the unknown armed group (including at least two Georgian citizens as well as at least five Russian citizens, all of the latter born in the former Chechen–Ingush ASSR).

Three Georgian special service personnel were killed and five were injured. On September 8, an injured suspected militant, Akhmed Chatayev, a Russian citizen of Chechen ethnicity holding a refugee status in Austria, was arrested. Chatayev was put on trial for illegal weapon possession but protests his innocence, saying he was actually a negotiator for the government and that he was carrying no arms; he was later acquitted. The operation was officially concluded on October 30.

Many details of the clash, the most deadly in Georgia since the 2008 South Ossetia war, still remain unclear. The governments of both Georgia and Russia, as well as Russia's Islamic insurgents of the Caucasus Emirate that abortively claimed that the unidentified armed group belonged to their main forces in Dagestan, accused each other of a provocation.

The incident was also lambasted by Georgian then-opposition (winner of the October 2012 election) coalition Georgian Dream, who accused Saakashvili's United National Movement government of lying about it and promised that those responsible for the deaths would be punished.

== Background ==
The incident saw the worst loss of life in Georgia since the brief territorial war with Russia, in which hundreds of people were killed during five days in 2008. Tensions between the two countries have remained strong since the ceasefire, with the Russian military continuing to occupy Georgia's breakaway territories of South Ossetia and Abkhazia and the two countries having not resumed diplomatic relations.

The deadly clash in Georgia took place against the backdrop of the continued Islamic insurgency in Russia's North Caucasus region, including the Republic of Dagestan, where the situation was reported to be worsening for Russia. In the months preceding the incident, the mounting violence in Dagestan had reached the point of practically daily reports of attacks and armed clashes, with scores of fatalities each month. On the very day of the skirmish in Georgia (August 29, 2012), a local Dagestani member of the Russian Border Guard, apparently recruited by insurgents, shot dead two of his fellow border guards and then killed at least five SOBR special purpose police officers from Russia's Altai Republic before being gunned down himself. The day before (August 28), Dagestani rebels attacked a base of Russian Interior Ministry special forces, reportedly seizing its armory building and killing at least two Internal Troops paramilitary soldiers. According to Caucasian Knot tally, during the week of August 27 – September 2, a total of at least 50 people fell victim to armed conflict in the North Caucasus, not including the events in Georgia.

The Russian government has repeatedly accused Georgia of offering a safe haven to the insurgents and the Western-backed Georgian government has consistently rejected Russian allegations. According to the BBC correspondent Damien McGuinness, "it was crucial for Georgia to act decisively, as there were fears in Tbilisi that Moscow would use any sign that terrorists from the North Caucasus are operating in the region as a pretext for moving [deeper] in to Georgia." Soso Tsintsadze, head of the Diplomatic Academy of Georgia, said a failure to "respond resolutely" would have exposed Georgia to "even more unpleasant developments". According to the website Vestnik Kavkaza, "such a radical decision and even tragic victims seem to be less evil than another explosion in Georgian-Russian relations in the event of the violation of Dagestani section of the border by an armed group from Georgia." Central Asia-Caucasus Institute analysis by Emil Souleimanov concluded: "As the counterinsurgent activities by federal and local armed forces gain momentum in Dagestan, the current epicenter of Islamist insurgency in the North Caucasus, where dozens of thousands of army and ministry of interior troops have concentrated recently, the pressure will increase on the insurgents to occasionally cross the Russian-Georgian, as well as the Russian-Azerbaijani borders, to secure a temporary safe haven. [...] Georgia and Azerbaijan would be prompted to either turn a blind eye on the presence of armed militants on their soil and risk a conflict with Moscow, which might use this as a pretext for exerting pressure on the South Caucasian countries with the ultimate risk of military interference, or risk a dangerous conflict with ethnic minorities of Chechen and Dagestani descent populating their borderline areas."

== Georgian special operation ==
On August 28, Georgian television reported that five young men from the village of Lapankuri in Telavi District, 20 kilometres from the Dagestani section of the border with Russia, had gone missing for several days. Some news reports cited local residents as saying that a few days earlier they had spotted several unknown men in military uniforms in the vicinity of the village. The missing men were soon reported found and taken by police for questioning. A former hostage said that the gunmen demanded to escort them to the border with Russia, promising to release them after reaching Dagestan and claiming they intended "to just quietly cross the border". A man identified as Levan Khutsurauili, described as one of the freed civilians, later said that he and his friends had been seized on August 26 by an armed group of about 15 bearded men while returning from a picnic near the border and told they would be shot if they tried to escape. According to some reports, the gunmen spoke Georgian.

Late on August 28, Georgian Interior Ministry released a brief statement saying that an armed group was detected and first reports emerged about movement of special forces in ground and air vehicles into the area. On the morning of August 29, the ministry announced that its troops blocked the gorge and were pursuing the armed group, and at 1 p.m. declared the operation as "anti-terrorist", claiming that the group had entered Georgia from Dagestan. Deputy Interior Minister Nodar Kharshiladze stressed: "We can't definitely say who these paramilitary people are and what their purpose is, but it is clear they were conducting some kind of terroristic activities there." Kharshiladze said that the militants had freed their hostages but then opened fire on security forces after being asked to surrender. The deaths of 14 people were announced shortly before 4 p.m. The ministry also said that at least six gunmen were continuing their resistance to Georgian security forces, but no further casualties were reported. On the next day, August 30, Georgian Prime Minister Vano Merabishvili, who has established an anti-crisis headquarters and held a meeting with all power ministers, announced the operations to be "nearly completed," saying it "ensured the security of our citizens and our borders," and that special forces were still searching for possible wounded stragglers from the armed group of around 20.

Speaking on national television late on August 29, Georgian President Mikheil Saakashvili said that a "well-armed and well-trained armed group appeared on the Chechen and Dagestan section of the Georgian-Russian border" and took Georgian citizens hostage, and that this group was "destroyed" in a shootout after having ignored repeated demands to surrender, adding that military unmanned aerial vehicles have been deployed at the scene. Late on August 29, National Security Council of Georgia Chairman Giga Bokeria said that it is plausible that the group had links with anti-Moscow groups in Dagestan and "obvious" that their presence in Georgia was connected with "developments there", presumably meaning the reported buildup of the Russian Ground Forces in the western districts of Dagestan bordering on Georgia (earlier that year, about 20,000 Russian Army soldiers have been transferred from Chechnya to Dagestan).

A more detailed Georgian government account was released later on August 30. According to it, the crisis had begun on August 28, when the armed group captured a patrol of the Border Police of Georgia who had been searching for the five missing local residents. The gunmen agreed to an offer by a senior border guard officer to keep just him as a hostage and to let go the civilians and the other border guards. Later, an official from the Georgian Interior Ministry arrived to negotiate and demanded their surrender, which was rejected. The group then decided to swap the last captive border guard for the official, telling him that he is now their hostage. Two of the gunmen then accompanied the official to a location where he could talk with his superiors to update them about the new developments, but instead they were led to an ambush site, where one of them was shot dead by a government sniper. The shooting sparked a firefight, in which 10 more members of the armed group and three Georgian troops were killed. Georgian forces used helicopters and aerial drones.

The killed Georgian troops were announced as being two officers of the Interior Ministry's special purpose police unit, Major Archil Chokheli (who was also the sambo coach of the national team of Georgia and former Europe and world champion in sambo, as well as former champion in kurash) and Captain Solomon Tsiklauri, and Corporal Vladimer Khvedelidze who served as a medic with the Defence Ministry's special operations forces. On August 30, Georgian police released video footage showing dead bodies of several men in camouflage uniforms with their faces censored, and weapons recovered from the site of the clash, including a variety of automatic weapons, several anti-tank grenade launchers and at least two sniper rifles (one of them equipped with a noise suppressor), as well as communication and night vision equipment, Russian passports and copies of the Quran.

On August 31, the Georgian Interior Ministry reported on the continuation of special operation in Lopota Gorge. On September 5, additional vehicles and helicopters with military and police special forces were sent into the area to reinforce the continued search for the estimated six remaining militants. On September 8, Interior Ministry announced it had captured one wounded member of an armed group, identifying the suspected militant as "a citizen of the Russian Federation from North Caucasus," Akhmet Chataev (Akhmed Chatayev), adding he was rendered the medical assistance and his life is not in a danger. According to the government announcement, Chatayev surrendered to a patrol of border guard to whom he handed over two live F-1 grenades. The operation officially ended on October 30 with the burial of four alleged militants.

== Identity and motive of the armed group ==
=== Official statements ===
More detailed official information about the incident has been slow to emerge, with interpretations offered by Saakashvili and Bokeria having been at odds. Initially, Georgian government-connected television stations Imedi TV and Rustavi 2 described the armed group as "saboteurs" and the initial Interior Ministry reports indicated involvement of infiltrators from Russia's Republic of North Ossetia–Alania. Later, the group was described as "terrorists" and "armed subversives". Parliamentary Chairman Davit Bakradze declined to comment but said that members of the armed group "are not citizens of Georgia." The Border Guard Service of Russia said that "no cases of crossing the Dagestani stretch of the Russian-Georgian border were recorded" and Russian officials called the reports of fighting in Georgia "a provocation." However, a RIA Novosti source in the Dagestani police said that the group was a part of a Dagestani insurgent group from Tsuntinsky District ("Tsuntinsky gang") and had indeed crossed the border with Georgia.

Vdagestan.com, a website of the Dagestan wing of the North Caucasus insurgency, took responsibility for crossing the border, but denied planning any operations on Georgian territory. They rejected the allegations of having taken civilians hostage, dismissing them as "lies and slander", and blamed the Georgian authorities for the bloodshed. The statement accused the Georgian side of arranging a "trap for the mujahideen of the Caucasus Emirate" by "betraying and killing the brave sons of the Caucasus", adding that "this is by no means the first time they have taken such a treacherous step in a bid to appease the Putinist regime in Russia," and threatened revenge attacks in case special operation was not stopped. The statement also appeared in another Russian Islamist and North Caucasus insurgency-connected website Kavkaz Center (KC), but was soon removed from both websites. KC then presented a different version, according to which "a detachment of recruits, secretly formed by the command of the Mujahideen on the border between Dagestan and Georgia, [tried to move] to a destination site on the territory of Dagestan to take part in the fighting against Russian occupation forces" but the Georgian authorities demanded that they surrender, regarding their presence on the Georgian soil as "a provocation, which could be used by Russia as a pretext for a new military invasion of Georgia." Regarding the alleged civilian hostages, KC said that "on the contrary, it is because the recruits released five Georgians, whom they incidentally met en route, the leakage occurred followed by subsequent tragic events."

On September 7, the Chechen language department of Radio Free Europe/Radio Liberty (RFE/RL), Radio Marsho, reported that it had been contacted by a Caucasus Emirate representative calling himself Abu Khamza, who stated: "All the necessary information is being gathered now. There should be a thorough investigation into the causes that led to such consequences. Only then we can make an official statement with conclusions and assessments of what happened." Chechen secular separatist leader Akhmed Zakayev said that his Chechen Republic of Ichkeria's government-in-exile has already established "a special committee" to investigate the causes of the incident. Zakayev said that "regardless of whether the Georgian side will cooperate with us or not, we have the appropriate resources to the reveal the truth. Afterwards, the Chechen legitimate government will express its position."

=== Media theories ===
According to RFE/RL, "It is, of course, possible that the Georgian authorities initially assumed that the incursion was masterminded by Moscow, and realized only after verbal contact was established with the intruders that it was not. Alternatively, they may have inferred at an early stage that the men were insurgents from Daghestan but killed them all the same, in order to perpetuate the uncertainty over their true identity and why they crossed the border and thus, by extension, the suspicion that Russia may have been behind the incident." Caucasus expert at the International Institute for Strategic Studies, Mamuka Areshidze, said it was "odd" that the special forces apparently did not try to take the gunmen alive for interrogation, as they could have shot to incapacitate rather than to kill. Russian military analyst Pavel Felgenhauer said he has an "impression that this clash was accidental from both sides. I do not have any reasons yet to connect what happened with the conspiracy theories. [...] What happened in Lapankuri looks more like a serious misunderstanding."

According to the Russian paper Kommersant, another alternative version "actively discussed among the Chechens living in Georgia" is that the gunmen belonged to a Chechen armed group heading for a meeting of field commanders with the Caucasus Emirate leader Doku Umarov in Dagestan and had entered Georgia's territory through the Chechen section of the Russian-Georgian border, but got lost along the way near Dagestan and so attempted to take the locals as guides. According to still another theory presented by Georgia's Russian language television channel PIK TV, the armed group might have come to Georgia to commemorate the son of the famous Chechen field commander Ruslan Gelayev (Gelayev was killed in a shootout with Russian border guards in 2004 in Dagestan's Tsuntinsky District while trying to enter Georgia), Rustan. Rustam was killed during the Battle of Aleppo in Syria in August 2012 and reportedly buried in Georgia's Pankisi Gorge, located several dozen kilometers from Lopota. Pankisi is an area populated by Kists, the ethnic Chechens of Georgia.

=== Identities ===
I quickly came to Lopota. Amiridze said that the men had to put down their guns and surrender. I went to the gorge to negotiate with the Chechens and Kists. There were 17 people there. I personally knew most of them. (...) I told their message to Amiridze and Khangoshvili on the phone. They gave me several minutes to consider our final answer. I was sitting on a hill for 10–15 minutes when suddenly a sniper shot me in the left leg. I did not have gun with me. I rolled down the hill; I wanted to hide. (...) Afterwards, I heard gunshots which lasted for about 2 hours. I was hiding for 10 days; I could not walk; the wound was getting worse and worse; finally I approached a customs checkpoint.

— Akhmed Chatayev's version of the incident

The person detained as an alleged militant turned out to be Akhmed Chataev (Chatayev), a one-handed ethnic Chechen refugee and Russian citizen who has received refugee status in Austria and lived in the Pankisi region for more than two years. On September 6, Information Center of Kakheti announced that Chatayev, described as the notorious Chechen warlord Dokka Umarov's personal representative in Europe (according to other sources, Chatayev was rather a former special envoy of the late Chechen President Aslan Maskhadov), who had briefly disappeared after the special operation in Lopota Gorge. Chatayev insisted that he had been brought by two Georgian Interior Ministry's counter-terrorist department officials, Sandro Amiridze and Zelimkhan Khangoshvili, as a negotiator to talk with a group of 17 Chechen and Kist militants that intended to travel to Chechnya via Dagestan. According to Chatayev, he was unarmed and was wounded when an unknown shooter suddenly shot him in his left leg as he was waiting for a reply from the authorities after relaying by phone the group's refusal to disarm. After that, he hid and barely survived for 10 days without any food nor water before surrendering to the Border Police, but his wound got seriously infected and a part of his foot was later amputated in the Gori Military Hospital, where he spent the next 10 days.

By September 3, seven of the 11 killed members of the armed group were announced as identified by the Georgian Interior Ministry. Among them were two Georgian citizens, Bahaudin Kavtarashvili (born in 1986) and Aslan Margoshvili (born in 1990). Another, Bahaudin Baghakashvili (born in 1986), was born in Grozny but had relatives in Georgia's Pankisi Gorge. According to unofficial reports, the total of six of those killed were natives of Pankisi. Five others, including Baghakashvili, were Russian citizens from the North Caucasus, specifically the former Chechen–Ingush Autonomous Soviet Socialist Republic: Musa Aduyev (born in 1981), Dukvakha Doshuyev (born in 1968) and Salam Zaurbekov (born in 1991) from the Republic of Chechnya, and Jabrail Khashiev (born in 1989) from the Republic of Ingushetia. The most prominent among the killed alleged militants was Doshuyev, veteran of the First Chechen War of 1994–1996 and a former bodyguard of Zakayev. Doshuyev had been detained and then given amnesty by Russian federal forces in early 2000. Notably, Moscow unsuccessfully tried to use him as a witness in their 2003 attempt to have Zakayev extradited from his self-exile in London. Zakayev commented: "I know that Dukvakha Dushuev, having political asylum in Great Britain, was not in Russia and lived in the Pankisi Gorge, Georgia for the last six months. It is unclear how he joined this group."

=== Nanuashvili's allegations ===
On April 1, 2013, Public Defender of Georgia Ucha Nanuashvili called on the Parliament of Georgia to set up an investigative commission to look into armed clash and events leading up to that incident, saying that his own probe revealed circumstances contradicting official version of events that was offered by the previous government. In an 800-page report, Nanuashvili alleged that the Interior Ministry's counter-terrorist department itself had recruited 120 local Kists, Chechens (including veterans living abroad) and other North Caucasian refugees. The recruits would be then armed and trained by Georgian personnel and Chechen veterans at the Vaziani Military Base and at Shavnabada in early 2012. In August, a group of 16 Vainakhs decided to cross the Russian border on their own initiative, but were refused a passage and intercepted by Georgian Interior Ministry special forces deployed there by helicopter. After the negotiations through prominent Chechen mediators did not bring a breakthrough in the standoff, as the militants responded to the demands they would disarm by insisting they would surrender their weapons only after they reached Pankisi, seven (not 11) of them and three Georgians (including two handlers of the gunmen) were killed, and the rest of them were then escorted to Turkey. The parliament declined Nanuashvili's proposal on the grounds that an investigation by prosecutor's office is under way.

Merabishvili, who was the Interior Minister in early 2012, dismissed the story as "idiotic" and in line with Russia's anti-Georgian propaganda. Former Deputy Interior Minister Gia Lortkipanidze, alleged to be in charge of the armed group, called it "absurd" and "slander". A prominent member of the Chechen community in Georgia, Umar Idigov, had previously alleged it was former Defense Minister Bacho Akhalaia who was the mastermind behind a supposed idea to create a force of Chechen fighters and infiltrate them into Russia. Akhalaia, who had also held the posts of chief of the prison system and Interior Minister, had already put on trial on multiple charges of exceeding power and abuse of soldiers and prisoners. However, his brother Data (Dato), himself a former Interior Ministry official who has been put on Interpol's wanted list on torture charges, claimed to be in possession of evidence that it was Merabishvili who had plotted the "adventure" in Lopota gorge as a provocation to discredit Akhalaia brothers as a part of a power struggle within the ministry. Tbilisi Mayor Gigi Ugulava dismissed Data Akhalaia's allegations due to their "absurdity" and hinted that Bacho Akhalaia's associates were targeting UNM party activists upon instructions from the new government.

== Reactions ==
=== Georgian government and opposition ===
On August 30, President Saakashvili visited Lapankuri, the village closest to the site of the events. Saakashvili called the incident an attempt to "stage a provocation", adding that incidents of this kind "directly or indirectly usually serve as a pretext for our country's invader," meaning Russia. Referring to North Caucasus peoples as "brothers," Saakashvili said: "We salute tourists but won't let raids of armed persons against peaceful population on Georgian territory." He added that "disorder and instability behind these mountains will stay there. We will do everything for this." Saakashvili also made a reference to the memory of lekianoba, the 17th–18th century raids in which bands of Lezgi highlanders from Dagestan ravaged the Kakhetian countryside of Georgia. On August 30, Georgia deployed sappers into the Laputa Gorge, who, according to unofficial information, would be used to set mine fields at this section of the border with Russia. Nevertheless, Deputy Foreign Affairs Minister Nino Kalandadze said that Georgia will continue its open policy to the North Caucasians.

Georgian opposition politicians said that the incident needs to be thorough investigated. Irakli Alasania, one of the leaders of the opposition coalition Georgian Dream–Democratic Georgia, said, that "there is not yet enough information to make a comprehensive analysis of what has happened. One thing is clear: our borders are not protected well and an armed group of 20 persons can cross into the country without being detected by the border guard. A comprehensive investigation needs to be carried out in order to look into who was in charge of negotiations with (the armed group); what was the subject of negotiations and why was this operation planned in such a way that led to death of so many people." The Georgian Dream stated: "Even based on existing scarce and contradictory information, which the authorities disseminate, there is an impression that the authorities have acted in a characteristically impatient manner and launched the special operation in a condition when the possibilities of a negotiated solution were not fully exhausted and in a condition when there was still a minimal chance of avoiding casualties."

Both the Georgian Dream opposition and Georgia's then-ruling party United National Movement have postponed earlier planned mass actions related to the upcoming parliamentary election due to the death of Georgian citizens. At a rally on September 9, Bidzina Ivanishvili, the leader of the Georgian Dream, accused the government of "insolently lying" about the operation and said that "tragedy" of Lopota would be investigated and those responsible punished, adding, "Georgian troops died there; Georgian citizens, Kists died there and North Caucasians died there too. This is not a Georgian dream; this can't be a Georgian dream." At his own rally on the same day, Saakashvili said about "a very dangerous military provocation in the Lopota Gorge" related to an alleged greater Russian plot to "give them [Russian government] a pretext to use our internal disorders and internal divide for implementation of their sinister plans" and charged that his opponents who are "weeping today for the fate of terrorists and have not even utter a word about our [three special forces personnel] who died, knew very well what this provocation was about; what this mess was all about." The election was won by the Georgian Dream opposition.

=== Other reactions ===
Georgian officials said Swiss diplomats were used to contact Russia about the border situation. However, Moscow did not respond to Georgia's proposal to cooperate. According to British expert Thomas de Waal, Russia side did not answer because it "does not want to thank the Georgian government." The only response came for Vadim Shibayev, a spokesman for the FSB, which is in charge of Russian border guard, calling the reports of trespassing from Russia "provocative" and groundless.

The NATO-Georgia Commission received information from the head of Georgian representation in NATO, Nugzar Mgaloblishvili. NATO and the European Union expressed concern about the situation and declared the need to "find a solution to the problem on the basis of internationally accepted norms." The United States Embassy to Georgia issued a statement "remembering three brave Georgians" and extending their "deepest sympathies" also "to the many other Georgian servicemen who continue to risk their lives to ensure a more secure Georgia and a more peaceful world."

Representative of the Chechen diaspora in Georgia and advisor to the State Minister for Reintegration Issues, Meka Khangoshvili, made a statement stressing that the incident should not become a cause for tension between Georgians and the North Caucasian nations. Akhmad Umarov, Doku Umarov's elderly brother reportedly living in Tbilisi, stated his opinion that the Georgian side "is not responsible for the death of the Chechen Mujahideen." A Chechen secular separatist website ChechenCenter said that "the only country that benefits" from this incident is Russia, saying that Russian President Vladimir Putin might to try to "divide and conquer" the Caucasus as the world watches the conflict in Syria.

== Aftermath ==
=== Burials ===
Captain Tsiklauri was posthumously awarded the Vakhtang Gorgasali Order, one of the highest decorations in Georgia, and buried on September 2 in Rusiani in a funeral attended by high officials including President Saakashvili. The funeral of Major Chokheli took place in Galavani on September 4, attended by Saakashvili, Interior Minister Bachana Akhalaia, chief of the National Olympic Committee Gia Natsvlishvili, other officials, and representatives of the opposition. Saakashvili and Akhalaia also attended the funeral of Corporal Khvedelidze, who too was posthumously awarded the Vakhtang Gorgasali Order and buried in Samtredia on the same day; Khvedelidze's family was given a new house from the state in compensation.

Saakashvili said that killed gunmen should be buried "with observance of their Muslim traditions," adding, "we are not Russian troops; we should pay relevant respect to killed" in a reference to the Russian government's official policy of destroying the corpses of alleged terrorists. Deputy Interior Minister Shota Khizanishvili also affirmed that the militants' bodies will be buried in accordance with their faith. On September 3–4, three of the killed militants (Baghakashvili, Kavtarashvili and Margoshvili) were buried by residents of Duisi in the Pankisi Gorge. On September 3, the Georgian Dream opposition issued a statement condemning "the criminally irresponsible information policy of the authorities" and said that "horrifying details are being reported about moral pressure exerted on relatives" of the killed gunmen by the government officials allegedly trying to hide the fact there were Georgian citizens among the members of the armed group. Allegedly, government officials conducted at least one burial at night and family members were forbidden to gather people for a funeral or even to see the body. The killed Chechens were buried also in Duisi village cemetery at night of October 30. Reportedly, family members of one of the killed Chechens arrived in Georgia in September but the government refused to hand over the body to them. In May 2013, the authorities re-examined corpses of Baghakashvili, Margoshvili and Zaurbekov; family members said they agreed for exhumations to be conducted despite Islam forbidding removing the dead from their graves, because they too want to find the truth. The bodies were exhumed in order to determine precisely how they died, as the results of the original postmortems have disappeared.

=== Chatayev trial ===
On October 24, Chatayev was accused of the illegal purchase, possession and carrying of an explosive device, facing between three and five years in prison if convicted. The date of a preliminary court hearing in the case was set on October 29. Chatayev, reported to have refugee status in Austria, denied the charge and pleaded his innocence, claiming that had arrived in the Lopota gorge to hold negotiation at a request of senior official of the Interior Ministry of Georgia and that the sniper wounded him in a leg while he was waiting for a reply from the government. According to Information Center of Kakheti, witnesses (three border guards who detained Chatayev) were compelled by the Interior Ministry to sign false testimonies in the case and Chatayev really carried no hand grenades. The hearing on the case, scheduled for November 15, was postponed till November 26 due to the absence of the border guard witnesses. Following Chatayev's arrest, his wife Aina Margoshvili left Georgia, presumably to go to Turkey, but later returned to Georgia and picketed the court hearings along with their son and dozens of Chechens under the slogan "Freedom to Akhmed Chatayev".

On November 13, Georgia refused to extradite Chatayev to Russia after Khangoshvili appealed to international human rights organizations to protect his rights and declaring him "arbitrarily imprisoned". Georgia's new justice minister Tea Tsulukiani said that "Georgia has refused to extradite Chatayev to Russia, and that is a matter of principle for us," because five Chechens, including residents of the Pankisi Gorge, whom Georgia extradited to Russia by the government of Eduard Shevardnadze in 2002 had "disappeared"; Tsulukiani said: "We know nothing about what happened to them, but this tradition must be brought to an end." She also promised that Chatayev would receive a fair and impartial trial in Georgia. On December 6, Tbilisi City Court agreed to free Chatayev on $3,000 bail. On January 18, 2013, the court acquitted Chatayev after the prosecutor has withdrawn all charges against him. Chatayev commented: "I knew that if the witnesses tell the truth, I would be acquitted."

=== Ivanishvili government investigation ===
In November 2012, the new government has reopened the investigation into the incident, conducted by the Interior Ministry is cooperation on with the prosecutor's office. In April 2013, Ivanishvili, who has become a new Prime Minister, said that the investigation may reveal "shocking" results and substantiate allegations of Nanuashvili. Ivanishvili's statement was strongly criticized as "irresponsible" and "dangerous" by Saakashvili, who declared "with full responsibility" that "Georgia never participated in training any terrorists." Alasania, who has become a new Defense Minister, and Parliament Chairman David Usupashvili, also a member of Georgian Dream, have distanced themselves from Ivanishvili's remarks.

=== Chechen government-in-exile investigation ===
The Zakayev government's report was presented by Foreign Minister Usman Ferzauli on August 1, 2013. Its findings repeat many of the allegations contained in Nanuashvili's report. According to the report by the State Commission of the Chechen Republic of Ichkeria, the main organizer of the armed group was Akhmed Umarov, working closely with the special services of the Interior Ministry of Georgia. He had been released from the FSB prison and allowed to leave the country for Georgia, where the Russian side might hoped he would organize a large-scale international provocation and create a casus belli for occupation of all of Georgia by Russia. The main instigators from the Vainakh side were also to include Gabriel (Jabrail) Khashiev, an ethnic Ingush wanted for murdering Chechens in Turkey, as well as Chatayev, described as Dokka Umarov's representative in Turkey and a relative of Dushuev. Most of the 200 recruits had left peacefully before the crisis in Lapota began, returning to their homes (in Georgia, the European Union, Turkey and Egypt) after the group's Georgian handlers refused to allow them to cross into Russia. The report names Georgia's Deputy Interior Minister Givi Lordkipanidze as the direct head of the operation in Lopota, which it says was coordinated by and approved by Saakashvili.

== See also ==
- 2017 Isani flat siege
- 2008 Georgia–Russia crisis
- Pankisi Gorge crisis
