= Countering Violent Extremism Task Force =

U.S. counterterrorism program

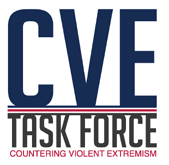

Agency overview
- Formed: 2011; 15 years ago
- Jurisdiction: United States
- Headquarters: Washington, D.C.
- Parent department: US Department of Homeland Security; US Department of Justice
- Parent agency: Federal Bureau of Investigation
- Website: dhs.gov

Countering Violent Extremism (CVE) was a US government program established under the Obama administration to counter all violent ideologies held by groups or individuals in the US by engaging communities in the counterterrorism effort and by education programs or counter-messaging. The program worked with community groups such as local governments, police departments, universities, and non-profits. It recruited community leaders, teachers, social workers, and public health providers to help the government in identifying people "at risk" of becoming violent extremists.

CVE was criticized for employing flawed indicators of extremism such as mistrust of law enforcement or feelings of alienation and for using religion as part of its metrics targeting Muslims. In April 2017, the Government Accountability Office published a critical report evaluating federal CVE efforts that stated, “The federal government does not have a cohesive strategy or process for assessing the overall CVE effort.” Also, its investigators could not “determine if the United States is better off today than it was in 2011 as a result of these tasks.”

In December 2016, the incoming Trump presidential transition team planned to stop the program from targeting white supremacists, which have committed bombings and shootings such as at a black church in Charleston. The program was also planned to be renamed to Countering Radical Islamic Extremism. Congressional Republicans criticized CVE for being politically correct and argued that using the term "Radical Islam" would prevent violent attacks. Community groups have had concerns that the program could be used to target faith groups for surveillance. In May 2017, the Trump White House proposed to cut all funding to CVE. In July 2017, George Selim, a Republican who worked in the Bush administration and headed the CVE, resigned. Selim said that government cooperation with Muslim communities had proven crucial to preventing terrorist attacks but that Trump appointees saw no value in this effort. In August 2017, reacting to reports that the Trump administration rescinded a grant to an organization fighting against neo-Nazism, the Southern Poverty Law Center warned that the threat of domestic terrorism from white supremacists remained high, pointing to an attack in Portland that happened in May.

In October, 2018, the task force existed in name only. Its staff members had returned to their home agencies and departments. In July 2019, the grant for the program expired. The program was in the Office of Community Partnerships, which by August 2019 became the Office of Targeted Violence and Terrorism Prevention (TVTP). The new office was a rebranding of the Obama-era initiative.
