= 1st Infantry Brigade (Georgia) =

- 1-ლი ქვეითი ბრიგადა
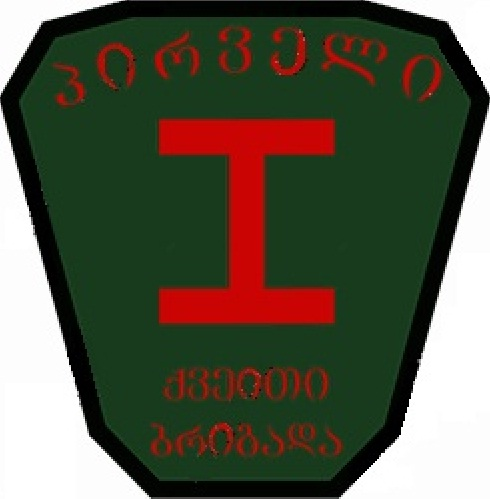
- Active: 1992 – Present
- Country: Georgia
- Branch: Georgian Land Forces
- Type: Infantry
- Part of: Operational Command East
- Garrison/HQ: Tbilisi, Georgia
- Engagements: War in Afghanistan; Iraq War; Russo-Georgian War

The 1st Infantry Brigade (Georgian: 1-ელი ქვეითი ბრიგადა, romanized: 1-eli kveiti brigada) is a military unit of the Georgian Land Forces. It is attached to the Georgian Operational Command East.

== History ==
The brigade was formed in 1992. The brigade participated in the Iraq War from January to August 2008. It was then withdrawn from Iraq due to the Russo-Georgian War. At the time of the Russo-Georgian War, the 1st Infantry Brigade was the only Georgian military unit that had been instructed to NATO military standards. The brigade was then deployed to Afghanistan from 2009 to September 2018.

== Structure ==
The brigade's structure is as follows:

- 1st Infantry Brigade
  - 11th Light Infantry Battalion
  - 12th Light Infantry Battalion - NRF
  - 13th Light Infantry Battalion
  - 14th Mixed Armored Battalion
  - Artillery Battalion
  - Logistics Battalion
  - Reconnaissance Company
  - Engineer Company
  - Signal Company
