= International counter-terrorism operations of Russia =

Russian government has been involved in many counter-terrorism operations abroad, in cooperation with other nations.

== Delhi security summit ==
The Delhi summit on security took place on February 14, 2007 with the foreign ministers of China, India, and Russia meeting in Hyderabad House, Delhi, India to discuss terrorism, drug trafficking, reform of the United Nations, and the security situations in Afghanistan, Iran, Iraq, and North Korea.

The Indian Foreign Ministry released a statement on behalf of all three governments saying, "We shared our thoughts on the political, economic and security aspects of the global situation, the present world order and recent developments in various areas of mutual concern. We agreed that co-operation rather than confrontation should govern approaches to regional and global affairs. There was coincidence of views against terrorism in all its forms and manifestations and on the need to address financing of terrorism and its linkages with narco-trafficking."

== Afghanistan ==
Russian Deputy Prime Minister Valentina Matviyenko announced in October 2002 that the Russian government would provide aid to Afghan refugees leaving Afghanistan if counter-terrorism operations against the Taliban created a humanitarian disaster. On 10 September 2002, the day before the first anniversary of the September 11, 2001 attacks, Vladimir Zhirinovsky, vice speaker of the State Duma and the leader of the Liberal Democratic Party of Russia, said Russia should remain neutral in the United States's counter-terrorism operations, during a round-table discussion in Moscow. Zhirinovsky said Russian troops should not go into Afghanistan because doing so would "grant [the] Taliban the right to invade Central Asia."

Afghan Foreign Minister Abdullah Abdullah met with Russian Foreign Minister Sergey Lavrov on 7 May 2004. They discussed improving Afghanistan's economy and security.

== Iran ==
The Russian government has worked with the United States and Iran in counter-terrorism operations. Alexander Gurov, the General-Lieutenant of Police and Chairman of the State Duma Security Committee, said the U.S. focus on fighting the Cold War partly contributed to its inability to predict the 9/11 attacks, and advocated greater cooperation between the two countries.

== Tajikistan ==
Drug trafficking in Central Asia is a major source of funding for terrorist organizations, second only to direct donations of military equipment and financing from state sponsors of terrorism. The Tajik government asked Russia on 15 May 2004 to begin withdrawing some of its 20,000 troops from Tajikistan's border with Afghanistan. The withdrawal of troops concerned the U.S. government because the troop presence helped prevent cross-border drug trafficking.
