= 2017 Isani flat siege =

Antiterrorist operation in Tbilisi, Georgia

- Part of Insurgency in the North Caucasus
Date	21–22 November 2017
Location	46 Gabriel Salos Street, Tbilisi, Georgia 41°40′20.9″N 44°52′00.1″E
Result	Georgian victory: Siege lifted

Belligerents
(Georgia (country)) Government of Georgia: Ministry of Internal Affairs; State Security Service of Georgia	Islamic State

Commanders and leaders
Giorgi Gakharia; Vakhtang Gomelauri	Akhmed Chatayev †; Shoaip Borziev (WIA); Aslambek Soltakhmedov †; Ibrahim Adashev †

Units involved
SSG: Counterterror unit; MIA: Police special forces	the "Chatayev group"

Strength
Undisclosed	4

Casualties and losses
(Georgia (country)) 1 killed, 4 wounded	(Islamic State) 3 killed, 1 arrested

The 2017 Isani flat siege was a confrontation between the Georgian police and security forces and an armed group of four Chechen men, including the former Islamic State officer Akhmed Chatayev, in and around a flat on Gabriel Salosi Street in the Isani district of Tbilisi, from 21 to 22 November 2017. Three suspected militants, including Chatayev, and one counter-terrorist officer were killed and four law enforcement personnel were wounded as a result of the about 20-hour confrontation. One member of the group was arrested. According to the Georgian security officials, the group planned to carry out terror attacks against foreign diplomatic missions in Georgia and Turkey.

== Siege ==
A special operation, involving the Georgian police and State Security Service, to disarm an armed group entrenched in a rented flat in a block in Gabriel Salos Street in Tbilisi's Isani district began late on 21 November and escalated to a gunfight and explosions overnight after hours of futile attempts by the authorities to convince the men to surrender. The fighting started when the suspects answered the authorities demands with heavy gunfire and tossing hand grenades at the security forces, wounding 5 officers, one of which named Ivane Golashvili died later in hospital. In response the police moved in with armoured cars and subsequently stormed the apartment. The operation was over by 17:00 local time on 22 November. In what the Georgian officials declared to be an anti-terrorist operation, three suspected militants, all "foreign nationals", were killed and one, later confirmed to be a Russian citizen, arrested. Two of the suspects were shot by police when trying to escape. No civilian casualties occurred. One of the killed militants was later identified to have been Akhmed Chatayev, who reportedly blew himself up during the shootout.

== Investigation ==
The government remained largely tightlipped after the operation and were criticized by the opposition for the lack of transparency. Chatayev, a former fighter in Chechnya, had been arrested in Georgia during the Lopota incident in 2012, but then released on bail and cleared of charges of possessing explosives on account of "insufficient evidence". He then emerged as a commander for the Islamic State in Syria and was designated by the United Nations as a "foreign terrorist". According to the head of the Georgian State Security Service Vakhtang Gomelauri, Chatayev and his associates made their way to Georgia in 2017, bypassing a border checkpoint, but declined to specify the country from which they crossed into Georgia. Gomelauri stated a weapons cache from which the group was supplied was found in the woods and that there were two versions regarding the group's planned activities in Georgia, without going into further details. The United States counter-terrorism experts were involved in the investigation.

== Perpetrators ==
One of the accused perpetrators, identified as "S.D." by the Georgia's Chief Prosecutor's Office, was later confirmed to be Shoaif Borziev, a 23-year-old Russian citizen of Chechen origin, who was wanted by Russia through Interpol. One of the dead suspects was identified as Akhmed Chatayev, a Chechen ISIS recruiter, by the State Security Service of Georgia. The Georgian security officials came up with more details on 26 December, claiming the group planned terror attacks against foreign diplomatic missions in Georgia and Turkey and identifying the other two killed militants as Ibragim Adashev and Aslambek Soltakhmadov. The former had visited Georgia from 2010 to 2012 "with various fake passports".

== Aftermath ==
On 26 December, the Counter-Terrorism Department carried out a double operation in Tbilisi and the Pankisi Gorge in northeast Georgia, inhabited by the ethnic Kists, a Chechen subgroup. As a result, four men allegedly linked with Chatayev's group were arrested. In the course of the operation, an 18-year-old suspect from the Pankisi Gorge, Temirlan Machalikashvili, was severely wounded by a gunshot and died in a hospital on 12 January 2018. According to the security officials, the boy attempted to detonate a hand grenade as the security officers entered his house, but the Machalikashvili family denied this and claimed he was asleep when the officers opened fire. A Georgian man allegedly linked with "the Chatayev case" was also arrested by the Turkish police in Trabzon.

On 27 July 2018, the Prosecutor's Office of Georgia stated the group and their accomplices arrived in Georgia to conduct terrorist acts in retaliation to the June 2015 arrest of Aiuf Borchashvili, a Pankisi gorge resident, on charges of recruiting locals for the ISIS. That day, the Tbilisi City Court ruled that Shoaif Borziev, Chatayev's number arrested during the Isani standoff, was guilty of plotting terrorist acts in Georgia and sentenced him to thirteen years in prison. Ruslan Shavadze, another member of the group, received the same sentence in absentia. He was detained in Georgia in August 2018. Four more men, all Georgian nationals, detained from December 2017 to January 2018, were found guilty of providing logistical support to the Chatayev group and sentenced from 10 to 12 years in prison.
