= Shavnabada =

Mountain in Georgia

Coordinates: 41°39′06″N 44°50′24″E

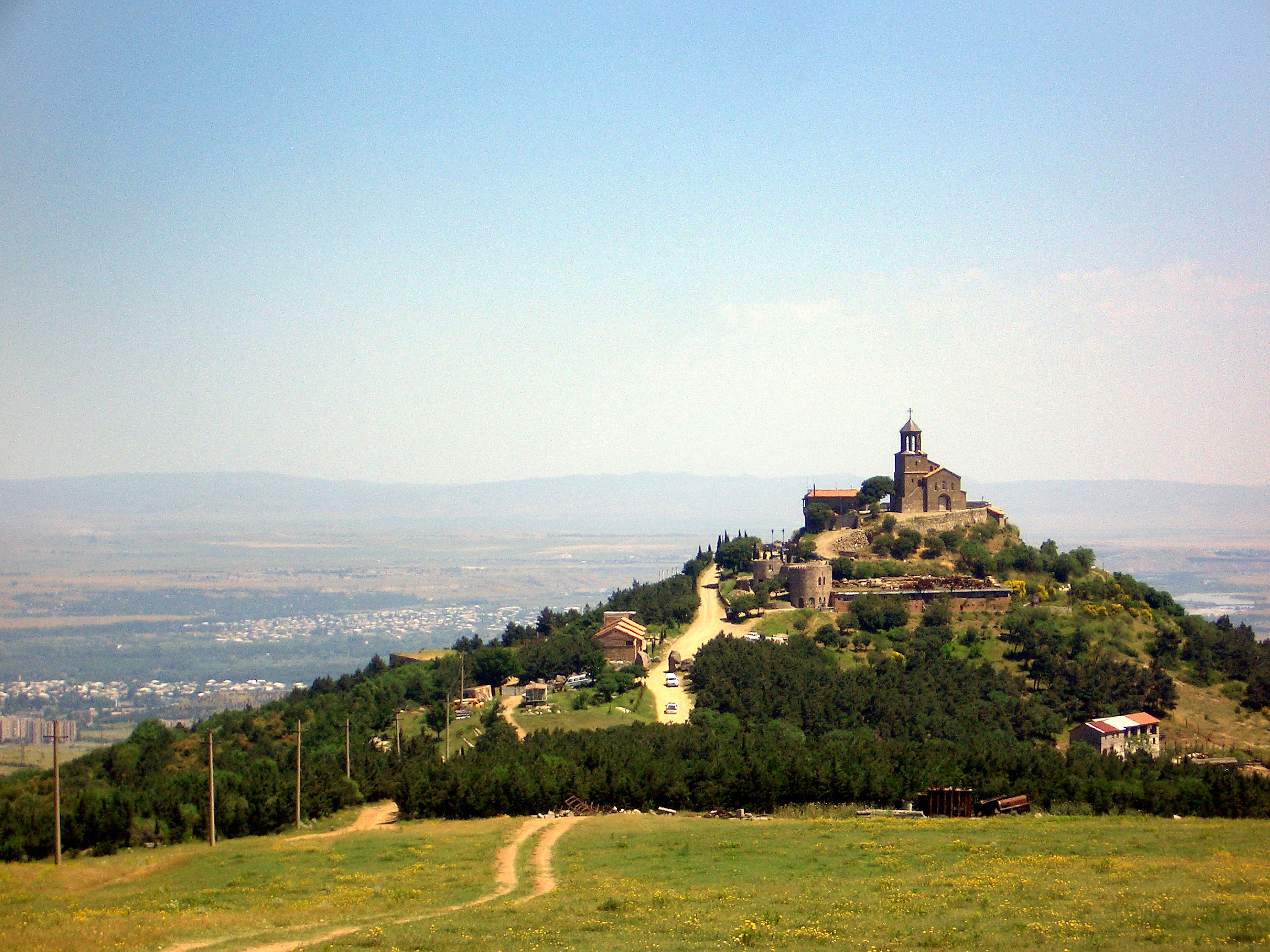
- Shavnabada Monastery

Highest point
- Elevation: 770 m (2,530 ft)

Geography
- Location within Georgia Location within Kvemo Kartli
- Location: Georgia
- Parent range: Teleti Range

Geology
- Rock age: Eocene

Shavnabada (Georgian: შავნაბადა) is a mountain and extinct volcano of 770 metres (2,526 ft) height in southeastern Georgia, some 96 kilometres (60 mi) from the nation’s capital Tbilisi.

The mountain is notable for a medieval Georgian Orthodox monastery built there in honor of St. George who, according to a local legend, wore a black cloak (Georgian: shavi nabadi, hence the mountain’s name) when leading the army of the king of Georgia in one of the victorious battles. The monastery is known for its rare variety of wine, also called Shavnabada, made by the monks.

"Shavnabada" is also a moniker for the 13th "Shavnabada" Light Infantry Battalion of the Georgian Army which was based at this mountain in the 1990s.
