= Georgian Land Forces =

- საქართველოს სახმელეთო ძალები
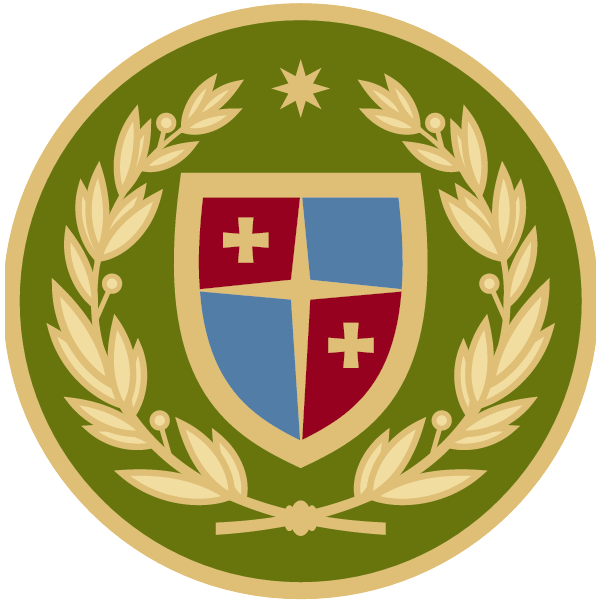
- Flag and logo of the Georgian Ground Forces
- Founded: December 1991; 34 years ago
- Country: Georgia
- Type: Army
- Garrison/HQ: Tbilisi, Georgia
- Mottos: "Motherland, Honor, Loyalty!"
- Engagements: Military history of Georgia; Afghanistan (1,560); Iraq (2,000)

Commanders
- Current commander: Overall: Lieutenant General Vladimer Chachibaia; Land Forces Command West: Brigadier General Shalva Jabakhidze

The Georgian Land Forces (Georgian: საქართველოს სახმელეთო ძალები, romanized: sakartvelos sakhmeleto dzalebi) are the land force component of the Defense Forces of Georgia. They are the largest branch of the military and constitute the bulk of the DFG.

== History ==
=== 20th century ===
After the collapse of the Soviet Union Georgia was left with virtually no military. Alongside the National Guard, Land Forces formed the core of the Georgian army. Most of the infantry brigades were created on the basis of old Soviet formations. Previously, the Soviet Army's 31st Army Corps was stationed in the former Georgian SSR. In the July 1993 issue of Jane's Intelligence Review it was reported that the 31st Army Corps was to leave Kutaisi (presumably for Russia) by the end of July 1993.

The 31st Army Corps had at the dissolution of the Soviet Union four divisions, two of which became Russian military bases, part of the Group of Russian Forces of the Transcaucasus. The other two appear to have transitioned into Georgian formations, as Georgian brigades appear in the same locations after the divisions disbanded. The 10th Guards Motor Rifle Division at Akhaltsikhe was replaced eventually by the 22nd Motorised Brigade, and the 152nd Motor Rifle Division at Kutaisi was eventually replaced by the 21st Motorised Brigade. The 25th Motorised Brigade was located in Batumi, with Roman Dumbadze the brigade commander by 2004.

The formation of the Georgian ground forces began in 1992. During the War in Abkhazia, following the advice of Lieutenant General Anatoli Kamkamidze, a close ally of Eduard Shevardnadze, the main body of Georgian army was organized as the 2nd Army Corps, consisting of two mechanized brigades (23rd and 24th mechanized brigades), as well as a mobile brigade and support units, numbering 17,000 men in total. Major General Geno Adamia commanded the 23rd mechanized brigade, Major General Zaur Uchadze commanded the 24th Mechanized Brigade and Major General Valeriy Kvaraia commanded the 2nd Army Corps. A second corps, 1st Army Corps, was created in late May 1993 after Gia Karkarashvili replaced Tengiz Kitovani as the Defence Minister, from the National Guard units.

In mid-1995, an air defence battalion was attached to each mechanized brigade. The corps system was removed, and all units were reporting directly to Army HQ. In early 1996 Richard Woff wrote in Jane's Intelligence Review that the ground forces had been commanded since May 1994 by Major General Gujar Kurashvili. He said they comprised five brigades: the 1st Guards (Georgian National Guard), the 2nd (Senaki), the 11th (Tbilisi), the 21st (Kutaisi), and the 25th (Adjara), as well as an artillery brigade. He said the artillery brigade, the 1st Artillery Brigade of the Reserve of the High Command, had been established on 10 November 1993, and had originated from an artillery battalion formed in Tbilisi in December 1991. According to the 1999 reports, the ground forces consisted of five mechanized infantry brigades and one artillery brigade: 1st National Guard Brigade (Tbilisi), 2nd Brigade (Senaki), 11th Brigade (Tbilisi), 21st Brigade (Kutaisi), 22nd Brigade (Akhaltsikhe), 25th Brigade (Batumi), and the Support (artillery) Brigade (Telavi). The 11th Brigade was considered as an elite unit and had been commanded by Valeriy Kvaraia since 1996. In mid-1997, a demonstration rifle battalion of 1,000 men was formed from the elements of the 11th Brigade.

=== 21st century ===
At the start of the 21st century the Georgian army was neglected in terms of equipment and training. The Georgian government subsequently asked for outside help in training its army.

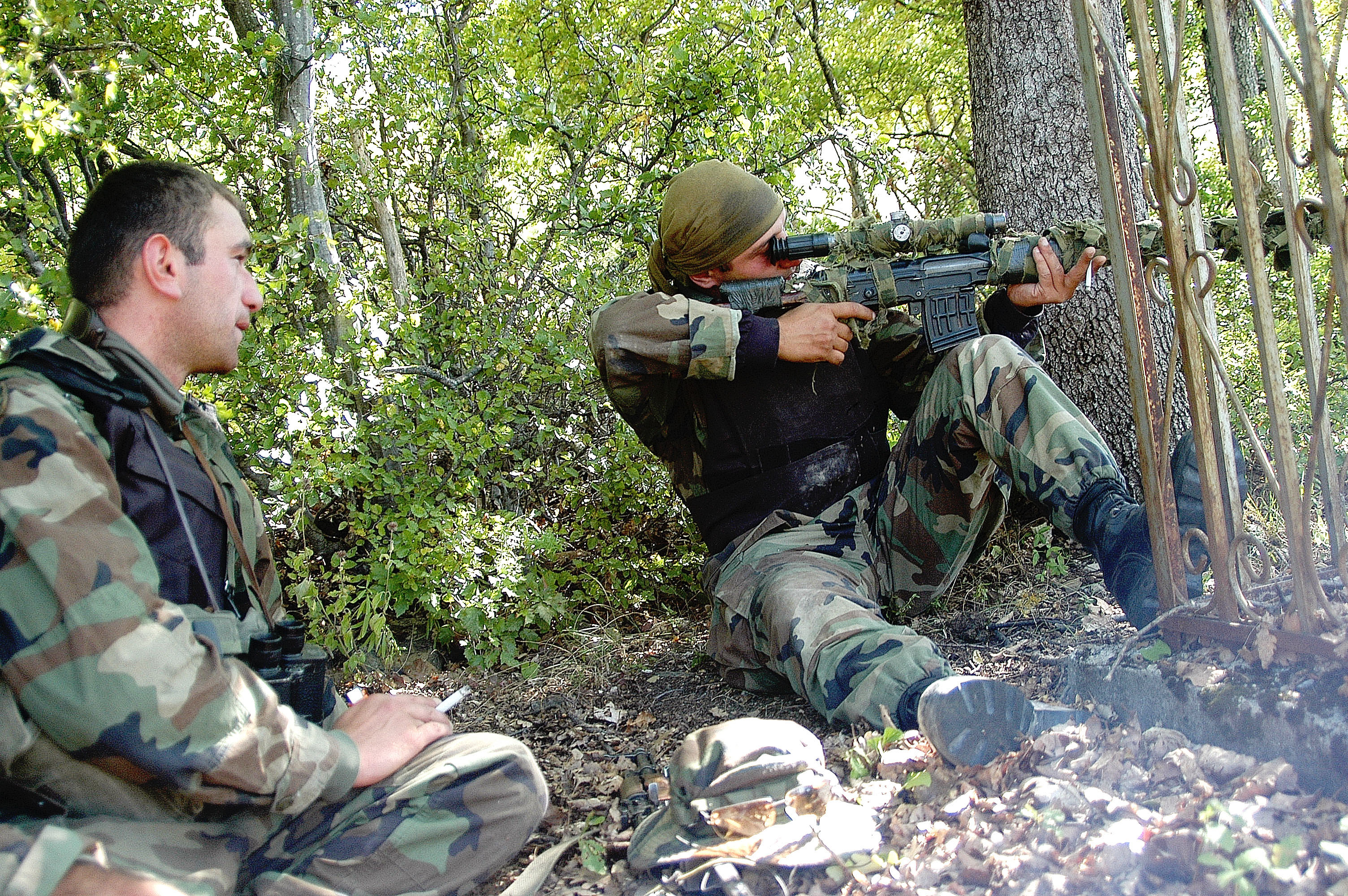
A Georgian sniper during the 2008 South Ossetia war.

The United States agreed to help turn the Georgian army into an effective fighting force. Georgia Train and Equip Program (GTEP) was an American-sponsored 18-month, $64-million program aimed at increasing the capabilities of the Georgian armed forces by training and equipping four 600-man battalions with light weapons, vehicles and communications. The program enabled the US to expedite funding for the Georgian military for Operation Enduring Freedom. Under GTEP, three Light Infantry Battalions of the 11th Brigade (renamed into the 1st Infantry Brigade and stationed in Gori), the new 21st Battalion of the 2nd Infantry Brigade (former 21st Motorised Brigade) and a new Combined Mechanized Company (later upgraded into the tank battalion) received training and equipment – 2,702 servicemen in total.

In early April 2004 the Georgian Defense Minister relieved General Dumbadze, commander of the 25th Motorised Brigade, of his command. Dumbadze was accused of disobeying Tbilisi's orders, and working on Aslan Abashidze's behalf to block the highway connecting Ajara to the rest of Georgia. When a new commander was appointed, Dumbadze mutinied, taking some 300 Ajaran soldiers and a few pieces of heavy weaponry with him.

In August 2008, following a series of fierce clashes in South Ossetia, the conflict escalated into the full-blown war involving Russian Federation, with Georgia being driven out of all South Ossetia and Abkhazia, losing parts of its military capabilities. According to Defence Minister Davit Kezerashvili, Georgia lost $400 million of material worth. Russian forces confiscated a total of 1,728 firearms. Out of its original 200 T-72 tanks, more than 65 were lost, including 24 that were captured intact. A total of 50 pieces of military equipment were captured, and some others destroyed. Parts of Georgia's relatively modern artillery and anti-aircraft units were captured and later destroyed. Despite these mostly non combat losses, President Mikheil Saakashvili claimed that Georgia had lost less than 5% of its military hardware capabilities, disagreeing on Georgian military figures. Georgia lost 171 soldiers during the conflict.

=== Peacekeeping missions ===
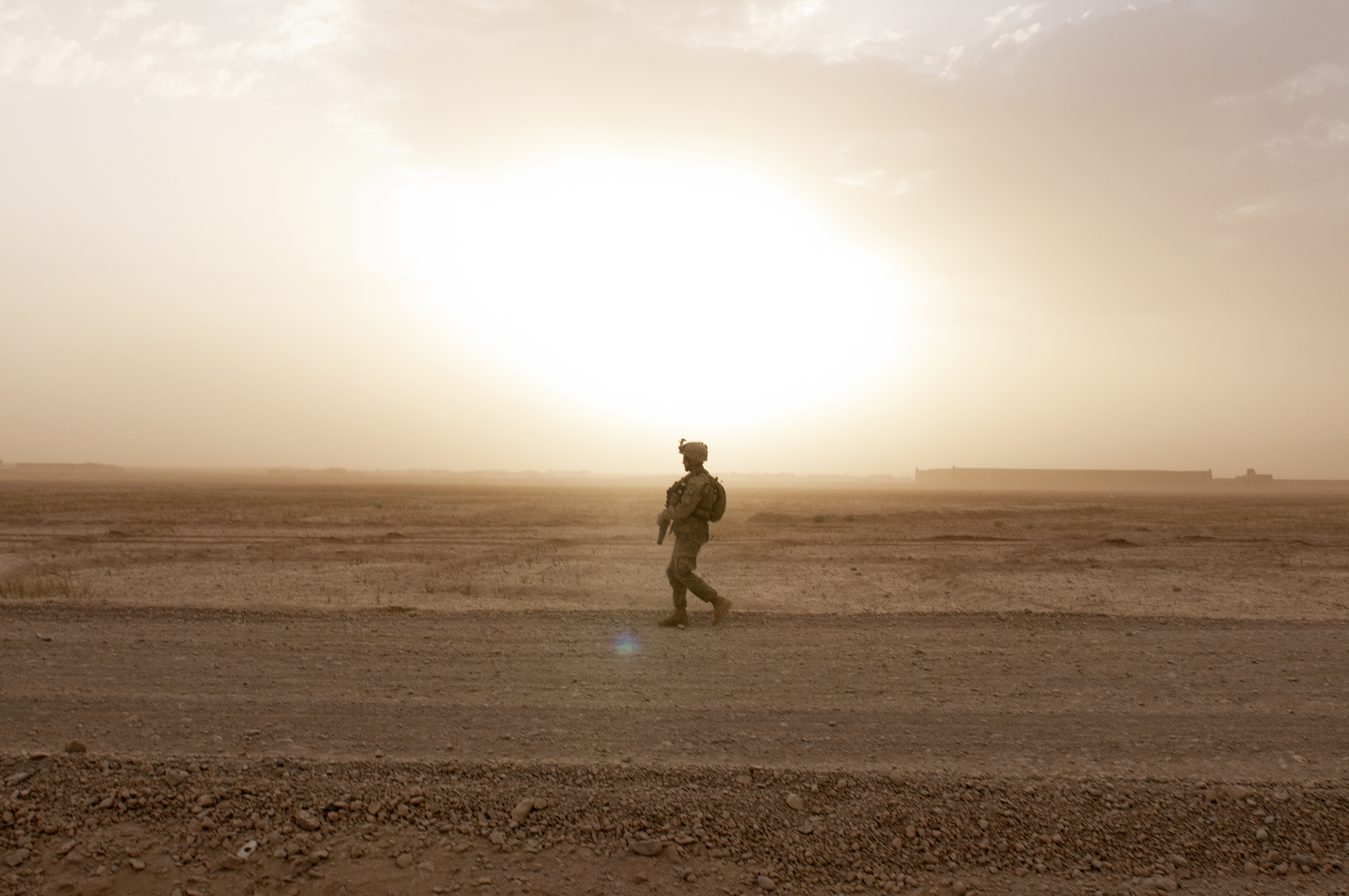
A Georgian soldier scans for enemy activity while on patrol in Helmand province, Afghanistan.

About 200 Georgian troops were deployed in the Kosovo (KFOR) in 1999–2008, 70 were deployed in Iraq (OIF) in 2003 and 50 in Afghanistan in 2004 (ISAF). From 2004 in Iraq were 300 Georgian troops. From 2005 approximately 850 troops were serving under Coalition Command (OIF and UNAMI). In July 2007 Georgia sent an extra 1,400 troops to Iraq; that brought the total number of troops in Iraq to 2,000. About 300 of these troops were assigned to Taskforce Petro and stationed at COP Cleary outside the town of Wahida near Salman Pak, Iraq. Their preparedness and training skills are evaluated on highest level by international experts. On August 8, 2008, Georgia announced it will withdraw of its troops from Iraq due to rising hostilities with Russia. On 10 and 11 August the entire contingent was airlifted back to Georgia.

Hence, owing to participation in international peacekeeping missions the military members are able to obtain practical experience and to show readiness to cooperate with NATO and with other partner countries' forces.

Georgia deployed infantry battalion to Afghanistan in 2010. In November 2012, Georgia had doubled the number of troops deployed to fight with Nato-led forces in Afghanistan to over 1,500. Georgia has 1,570 troops serving there, making the small Caucasus country of 4.5 million people the largest non-Nato contributor to the Afghanistan mission. Currently there are more than 880 Georgian combat troops deployed in Afghanistan where Georgia has thus far suffered 32 deaths and over a hundred injuries. In September 2012, Georgia stated that it would continue its contributions in Afghanistan following the 2014 NATO withdrawal.

== Structure ==
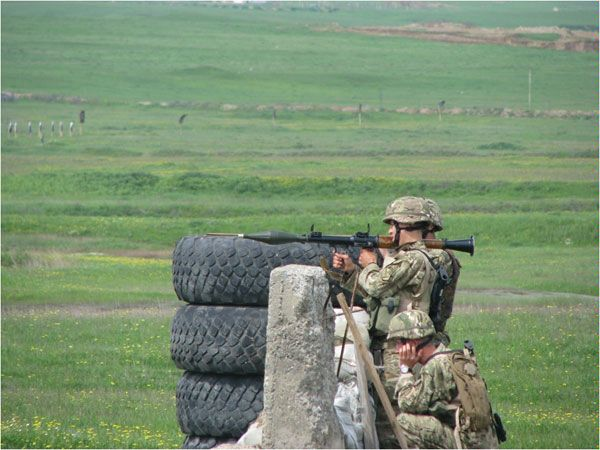
Georgian soldiers prepare to shoot a rocket propelled grenade during training.

The Georgian Land Forces are divided in East and West Command. They are primarily brigade and battalion sized army units. The bulk of the Land Force is composed of four regular infantry brigades and two artillery brigades. In addition it fields one Engineer Brigade, one Air-Defense Brigade, one Signal Battalion, one Technical Reconnaissance Battalion, one Medical Battalion, two separate Anti-Tank Battalions and one separate Light Infantry Battalion. There are also non-regular formations which are the special operations forces, military intelligence and military police.

Name	Location
1st Infantry Brigade	Tbilisi
2nd Infantry Brigade	Senaki
3rd Infantry Brigade	Kutaisi
4th Mechanized Brigade	Vaziani Military Base
5th Infantry Brigade	Gori
1st Artillery Brigade	Vaziani Military Base
2nd Artillery Brigade	Khoni
Engineering Brigade	Tbilisi
Aviation Brigade	
Air Defence Brigade	
12th Light Infantry Battalion "Commando"	Adlia
13th Light Infantry Battalion "Shavnabad"	Adlia
Independent Signals Battalion	Saguramo
Independent Radio Battalion	Kobuleti
Independent Signals Battalion	
Independent Medicine Battalion	Saguramo

=== Combat composition ===
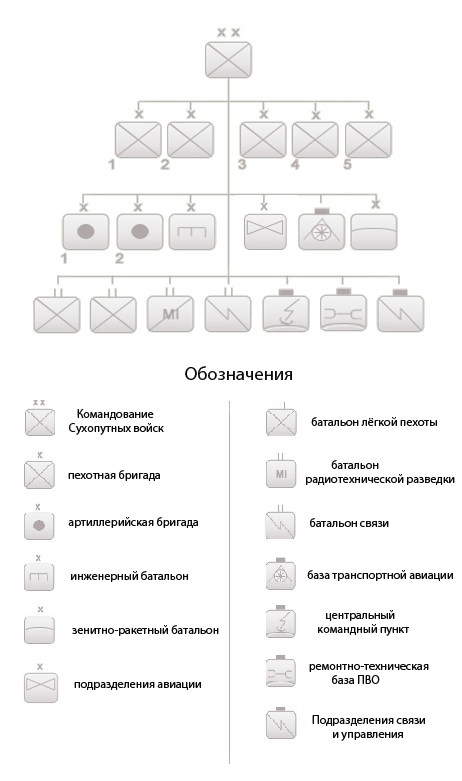
Structure of the Land Forces.

- 1st Infantry Brigade
  - 11th Infantry Battalion
  - 12th Infantry Battalion
  - 13th Infantry Battalion
  - 14th Infantry Battalion
- 2nd Infantry Brigade
  - 21st Infantry Battalion
  - 22nd Infantry Battalion
  - 23rd Infantry Battalion
- 3rd Infantry Brigade
  - 31st Infantry Battalion
  - 32nd Infantry Battalion
  - 33rd Infantry Battalion
- 4th Infantry Brigade
  - 41st Infantry Battalion
  - 42nd Infantry Battalion
  - 43rd Infantry Battalion
- 5th Infantry Brigade
  - 51st Infantry Battalion
  - 52nd Infantry Battalion
  - 53rd Infantry Battalion
- 12th Light Infantry Battalion "Commando"
- 13th Light Infantry Battalion "Shavnabad"
- 1st Artillery Brigade
- 2nd Artillery Brigade
- Engineering Brigade
- Aviation Brigade
  - Air Squadron
  - Helicopter Squadron
- Air Defence Brigade
- Independent Signals Battalion

== Equipment history and domestic production ==
From 1992 till 2003 the Georgian army heavily relied on Soviet military equipment, which became outdated over time, and for the most part went out of order due to poor maintenance. According to the 1995 reports, the army's equipment at that time included 40 Russian T-55 tanks and 30 T-72 tanks, plus 80-100 towed artillery guns. More than 100 T-55 tanks were decommissioned and scrapped since 2000, leaving only a dozen left in the inventory. Numerous other military hardware, including T-72 tanks, were donated to the armed forces of the Ministry of Internal Affairs but these were also decommissioned in 2004 due to its reorganization process. Since 2001 Georgia started petitioning for NATO membership and enhancing its military capabilities in cooperation with numerous post-Soviet suppliers such as the Czech Republic and Ukraine.

In 2003 the Georgian government undertook efforts in acquiring modern hardware, which included a delivery package from Israel, containing a classified number of air defense systems and small arms. Expansions of the agreement that included a long-term supply of Merkava III-IV tanks were repeatedly rejected by the Israeli side. Thus Georgia began buying large amounts of T-72 tanks, which led to a scandal involving the delivery of a dozen broken down T-72s from Ukraine. Even though the new plan was revoked, a large armoured fleet was established within a few years and in 2005 the Georgian army was able to field over 170 tanks during exercises. With the help of Israel and Poland, a large portion of T-72 tanks were upgraded with modern electronics. In 2007 Georgia began acquiring more modern hardware from Turkey and other NATO members.

During the 2008 Russo-Georgian War, the Georgian military suffered numerous material losses, including newly updated tanks and infantry fighting vehicles that were left behind during the ceasefire and captured or destroyed by Russian troops. After the war, Georgia started filling these gaps with renewed agreements, and increased its efforts to enhance the country's defence capabilities. Due to lack of support from its allies and Russian-imposed weapons delivery blockade, Georgia found itself in need of alternatives.

Until 2009, Georgia was only able to produce uniforms and body armor, which were still so limited in amount that it never met requirements, thus making Georgia still dependent on foreign suppliers. Georgia uses a series of domestically produced equipment which have been in mass production since 2009. These include up to seven land based vehicles, diverse weapons and aerial vehicles for reconnaissance.

After several years of development the country unveiled its first locally produced armoured personnel carrier, the Didgori. In 2012 the second domestically developed combat vehicle, called the Lazika Infantry Fighting Vehicle was unveiled, however its status remains unclear to this date. Several other objects such as the ZCRS-122 have started a Georgian arms industry and reduced dependency on foreign suppliers to some extent.

The largely unofficial arms blockade was eventually lifted as a result of the 2014 Wales summit. Georgia made several deals with France in 2015 to acquire more advanced air defence radars and missiles such as the GM-200 / GM-403 and Mistral systems, which were delivered in 2018. Further cooperation and contracts are planned to keep improving capabilities in that area.

In January 2018, Georgia also received some 72 FGM-148 missile launchers and a first batch of around 410 missiles from the United States to enhance its anti-tank defence capabilities.
