= Akhmed Chatayev =

Russian militant

Akhmed Rajapovich Chatayev
- Born: 14 July 1980; Vedeno, Vedensky District, Chechnya, Russian SFSR, USSR
- Died: 22 November 2017 (aged 37); Tbilisi, Georgia
- Known for: Planning the 2016 Atatürk Airport attack

Akhmed Chatayev, Ahmad Shishani (Russian: Ахмед Чатаев, Ахмад Шишани; 14 July 1980 – 22 November 2017) was a Chechen militant and Islamic State leader who is thought to have been the planner of the 2016 Istanbul airport attack and was one of the Chechen mujahideen in Syria. He was killed in a shootout with Georgian security forces in Tbilisi on 22 November 2017.

== Biography ==
=== Early life ===
Chatayev was born on 14 July 1980 in Vedeno village, Vedensky District, Chechnya, in the then Checheno-Ingush ASSR, in Soviet Russia.

=== Second Chechen War ===
He participated in the Second Chechen War and lost his arm in battle.

=== Europe ===
He then fled Russia in 2001 to Austria where he was granted refugee status in 2003. In 2008 he and several other Chechens were detained in the Swedish town of Trelleborg. Police found weapons in his car and he spent more than a year in a local prison.

On 3 January 2010, he was detained in Uzhhorod in western Ukraine. According to Interior Minister Yuriy Lutsenko, his mobile phone contained instructions for explosives, as well as photographs of those killed in explosions. He faced extradition to Russia but on 14 January, after strong protests by Amnesty International, which claimed he could face torture if he was returned to Russia, the European Court of Human Rights called upon the Ukrainian authorities not to extradite him.

Since the European Court of Human Rights forbade his deportation to Russia, the Ukrainians sent him to Georgia where he was accused of a certain crime committed in the 2000s. For a while, he was probably held in a Georgian prison but then was freed, got married and stayed in Georgia. On 19 May 2011, Chatayev was detained at the Bulgarian-Turkish border. The Bulgarian court first ruled to extradite him to Russia, but the appellate court reversed the decision.

In August 2012, Chatayev reappeared in Georgia, where he was wounded, losing his foot, and arrested in the Lopota incident, a skirmish between the Georgian police and Caucasian militants, near the Dagestan section of the border with Russia. He was soon released from jail on bail. In January 2013, Georgian prosecutors dropped the case against him on account of the absence of evidence. Soon he left Georgia with the declared intention to travel to Austria for rehabilitation, where he also was supported by an NGO called "Asyl in Not". In Austria he was given the name David Mayer and was able to live in a Gemeindebau.

=== Syria ===
He appeared in an ISIS video in 2012 alongside Abu Jihad in Syria and was the commander of the Yarmouk Battalion.

He is thought to have planned the 2016 Istanbul airport attack, which killed 44 people.

== UN sanctions ==
In October 2015, Chatayev was designated as a foreign terrorist by the United Nations Security Council and the U.S. Department of the Treasury and thus subject to sanctions. According to the UN, "In September 2007, Chataev organized a delivery to the Chechen Republic, Russian Federation, consisting of US$12,000, military uniforms, a personal computer and audio equipment for the terrorists operating in the Northern Caucasus." Further, it is alleged, "He directly commands 130 militants and calls on Muslims to join the armed fight against the official authorities in Syrian Arab Republic, Iraq, and other countries with the aim of establishing a caliphate. Chataev is responsible for training and redeploying Russian-speaking IS militants from the Syrian Arab Republic and Iraq to the Russian Federation with a view to setting up IS cells and conducting terrorist acts. He is the organizer and mastermind of planned IS terrorist acts against Russian diplomatic missions abroad."

== Death ==
In November 2017, the Georgian State Security Service said Chatayev was likely to have been killed in a 20-hour counter-terrorism operation in Tbilisi on 22 November which killed one Georgian special forces serviceman and three members of an armed terrorist group. Four police officers were wounded and one member of the group was arrested. The security officials later confirmed that Chatayev was killed in the shootout when he blew himself up. His body was identified by DNA and fingerprint analysis.

For unstated reasons, the Office of Foreign Assets Control updated their entry for Chatayev on the Specially Designated Nationals and Blocked Persons List. Originally listed as sanctioned due to connection to Jama'at al-Tawhid wal-Jihad, he is now listed as connected to IS.
