= South Ossetian clashes =

Clashes in the Tskhinvali region (2004)
- Part of Georgian–Ossetian conflict
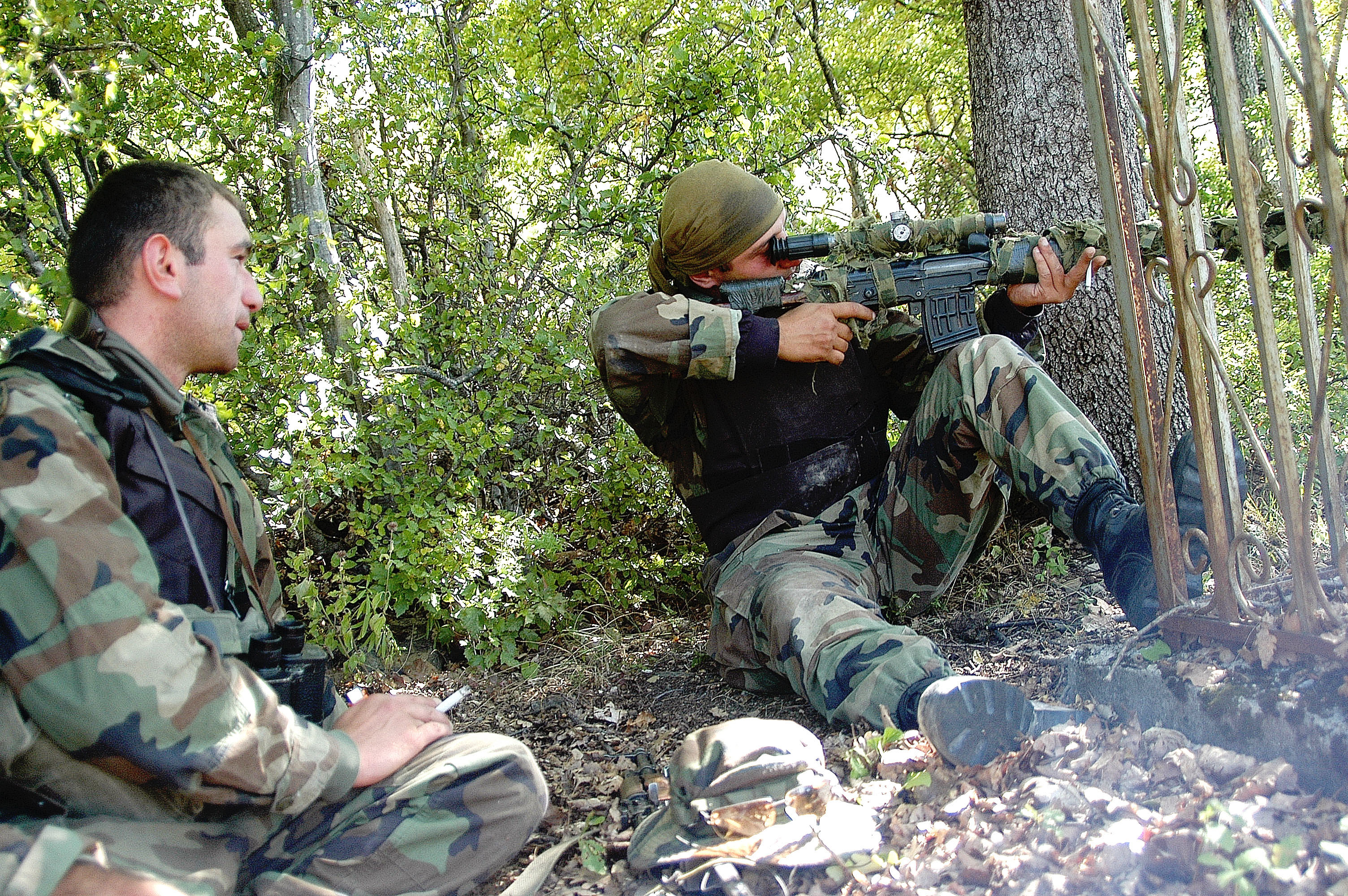
- Georgian soldiers
Date	7 July – 19 August 2004
Location	Tskhinvali region
Result	Ceasefire

Belligerents
South Ossetia; Russia	Georgia

Commanders and leaders
(South Ossetia) Eduard Kokoity (Russia) Vladimir Putin	(Georgia (country)) Mikheil Saakashvili (Georgia (country)) Zurab Zhvania

Strength
=== South Ossetia === : South Ossetian militia; South Ossetian security forces; North Ossetian volunteers; Strength: Approximately 500 South Ossetian peacekeepers within the Joint Peacekeeping Forces (JPKF); Additional militia and volunteer formations (exact number unknown); === Russia === : Russian Peacekeeping Battalion (Joint Peacekeeping Forces); Russian military advisers and peacekeeping personnel; Strength: Approximately 500 Russian peacekeepers deployed as part of the Joint Peacekeeping Forces; Russian battalion strength estimated at about 500 personnel under JPKF regulations; TOTAL: 1K Russian-Ossetian Strength	=== Georgia === : Georgian Peacekeeping Battalion; Commando Battalion; Ministry of Internal Affairs troops; Georgian police units; Strength: 150 Georgian peacekeepers initially deployed in the conflict zone; Reinforced by approximately 350 additional peacekeepers in June 2004, bringing the total authorized Georgian peacekeeping force to about 500 personnel; Additional Interior Ministry troops and police units present in Georgian-controlled villages; 11 Georgian mechanized Brigade TOTAL: 500 Georgian strength

Casualties and losses
South Ossetia: Killed: 7 Ossetian fighters; Wounded: 30 civilians; Russia: 3 killed; Killed: 8 Cossack volunteers (claimed by Georgia; disputed by South Ossetian authorities); 18 Killed, 30 Wounded	(Georgia (country)) Georgia: Killed: 12 servicemen; Wounded: 14 servicemen; Captured: 19-50 hostages; Wounded: 1 civilian; 12 killed, 15 wounded, 19-50 captured

The 2004 South Ossetian clashes were a series of armed confrontations between Georgia and the separatist South Ossetian forces during July–August 2004. The clashes ended with a ceasefire agreement on 19 August 2004.

During the fighting, 12 Georgian soldiers were killed. 3 Russians and seven Ossetians were also killed.with alleged 8 cossack mercenaries

According to Georgian Interior Ministry reports, at least six Ossetian fighters were killed during overnight exchanges of fire in the conflict zone. The Georgian police stated that the clashes began after their positions came under fire from South Ossetian forces, after which Georgian units returned fire.

The de facto authorities of South Ossetia denied these claims and stated that there were no casualties.

== In media ==
Additional reporting on the same events:

- RFE/RL summary of the incident:

- Irish Times report (noting conflicting casualty claims):

- RFE/RL detailed report: "South Ossetian Information and Press Committee head Irina Gagloyeva claims 30 people — both civilians and separatist security forces — were wounded in Tskhinvali and nearby ethnic Ossetian villages during the shootout". Georgian officials confirmed the death of three Georgian servicemen in overnight fighting on 18 August, bringing the total Georgian death toll to 12 since 12 August. According to still-unconfirmed reports by Georgian sources, at least 10 South Ossetian fighters, including mercenaries from Russia, died in the skirmish.

"A sniper is taking aim at Ossetian soldiers in South Ossetia to make sure the small Georgian army unit can move forward".

== Conflict ==
The 2004 Tskhinvali clashes were a series of armed incidents between Georgian government forces and South Ossetian separatist militias in July–August 2004, marking a major escalation in the long-running Georgian–Ossetian conflict. The fighting ended with a ceasefire agreement on 19 August 2004.

According to official Georgian parliamentary statements and Interior Ministry reports, a total of 12 Georgian servicemen were killed during the August 2004 escalation. In addition, Georgian sources reported that around 14 Georgian soldiers and police officers were wounded in separate incidents during the clashes, including overnight exchanges of fire in early and mid-August 2004. One civilian casualty (wounded) was also reported in Georgian official summaries of the conflict period.

During the Georgian–South Ossetian conflict period, especially in the early 2000s and after the 2004 clash, Georgian civilians were frequently detained in the South Ossetia conflict zone. These incidents were typically described by Georgian authorities as illegal detentions or hostage-takings, while South Ossetian authorities often referred to them as arrests for alleged illegal border crossing. At least 3 Russians were killed during the 2004 incidents, and 1 Ossetian militia force member.
