= Devi Chankotadze =

Georgian lieutenant-general

Lieutenant-General Devi Chankotadze
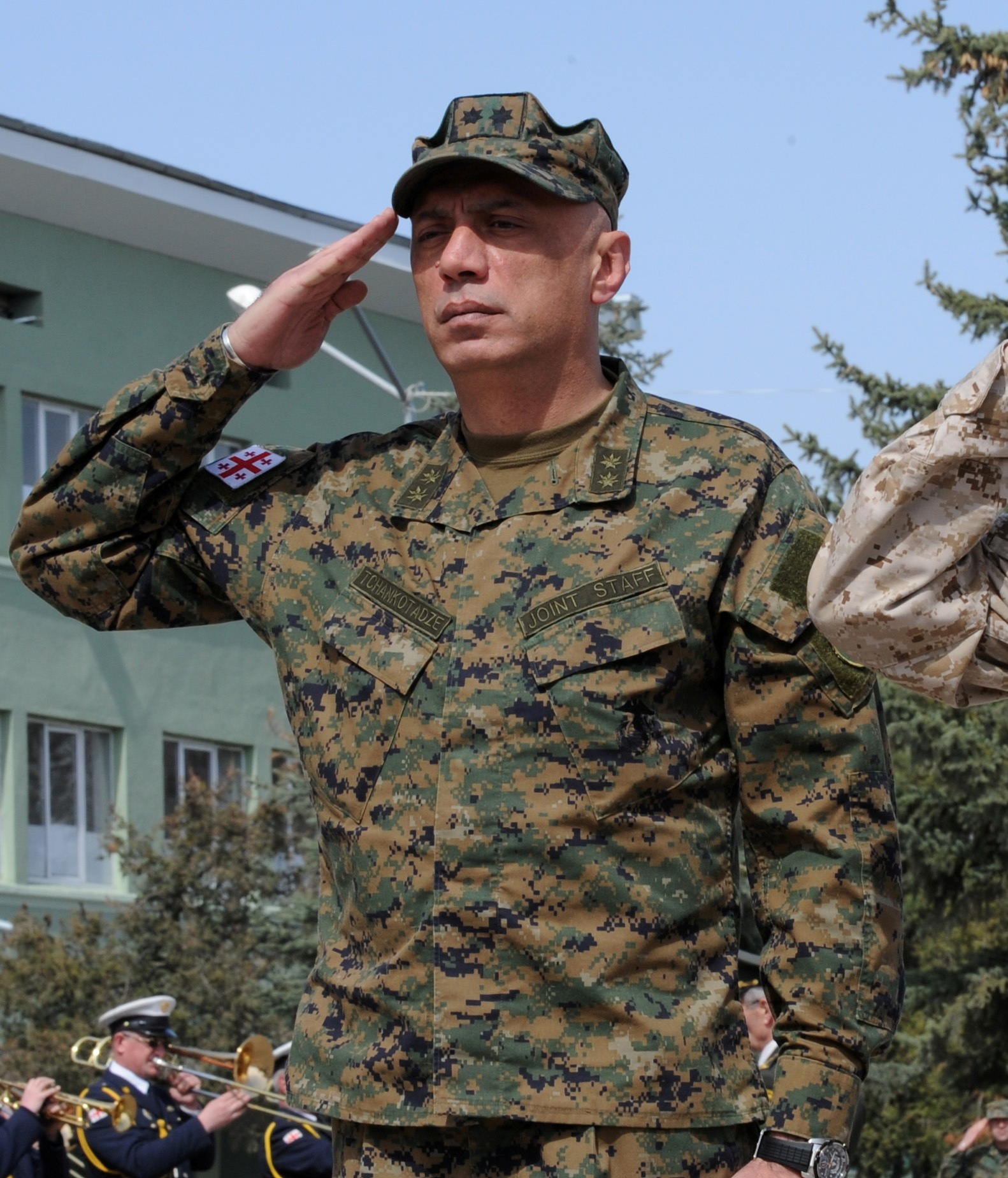

Member of the Parliament of Georgia
- Incumbent
- Assumed office December 11, 2020

Chief of Joint Staff of the Georgian Armed Forces
- In office March 5, 2009 – October 8, 2012
- President: Mikheil Saakashvili
- Preceded by: Vladimer Chachibaia
- Succeeded by: Giorgi Kalandadze

Personal details
- Born: September 1, 1961 (age 64) Gori (Georgian SSR)
- Party: United National Movement
- Profession: Military
- Civilian awards: Presidential Order of Brilliance (2010)

Military service
- Allegiance: Georgia
- Branch/service: Georgian Army
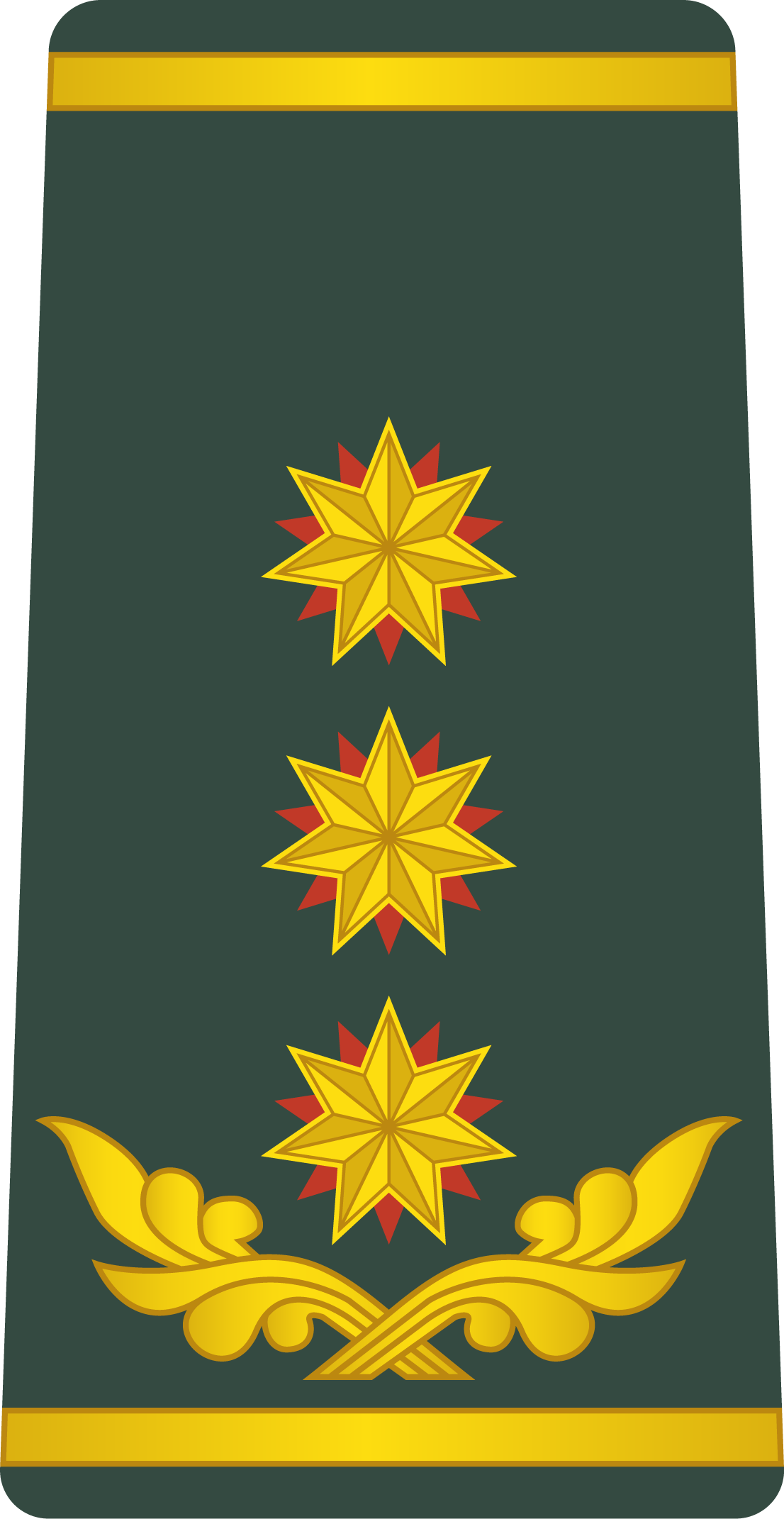
- Rank: (honorary)
- Commands: Georgian Armed Forces
- Battles/wars: Russo-Georgian War
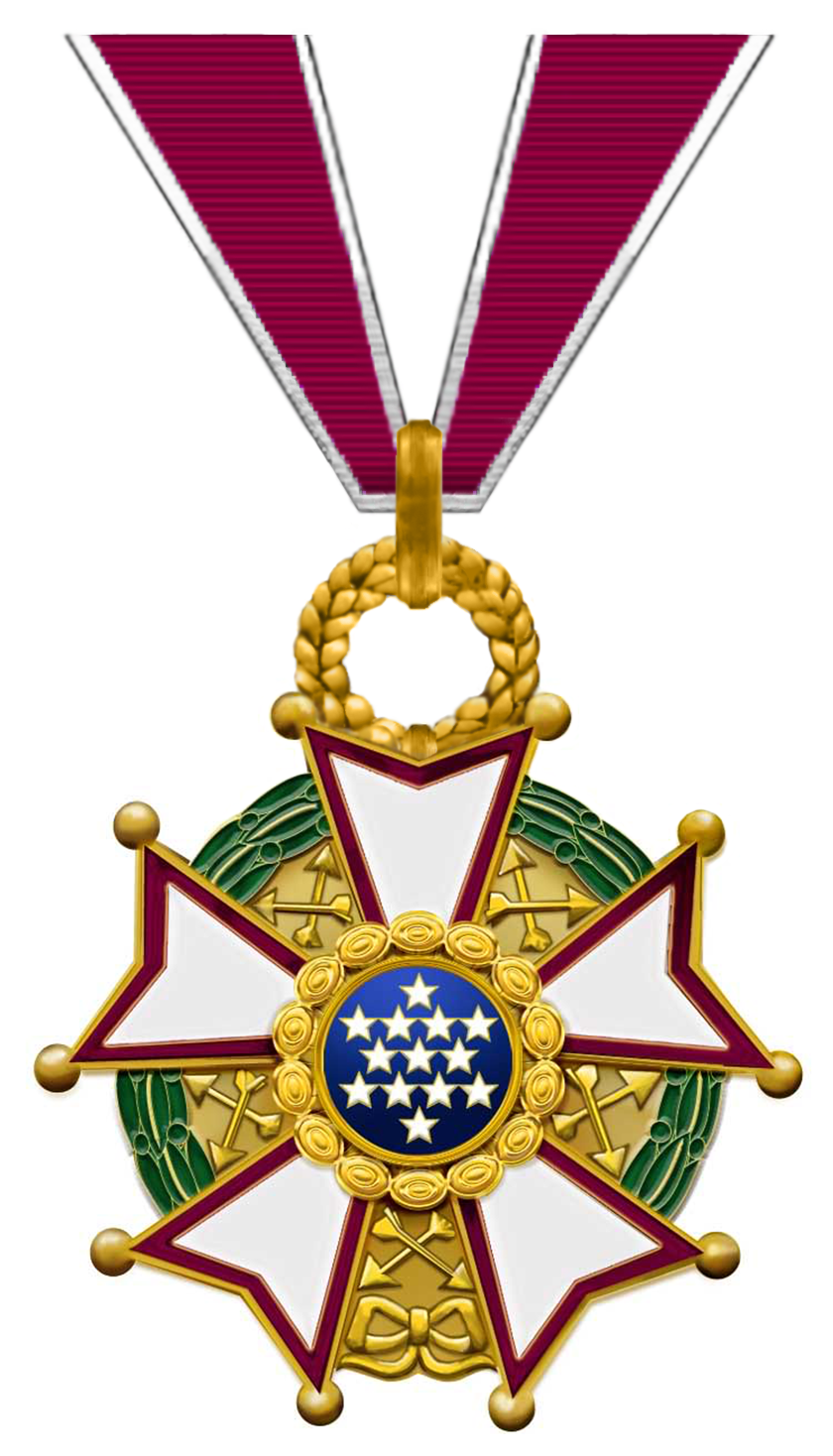
- Military awards

Devi Chankotadze (Georgian: დევი ჭანკოტაძე, born on September 1, 1961) is a Georgian military leader and politician who served as Georgia's Chief of the Joint Staff of the Armed Forces in 2008–2012, and has served as a member of the Parliament since 2020. He carries the rank of Lieutenant General.

Starting his military career during the Soviet Union, he joined a volunteer militia based in Tbilisi in 1990 as Soviet forces began to disintegrate, before becoming a member of the newly formed National Guard. With several conflicts ravaging Georgia in the early 1990s, he became head of the National Guard's Artillery Regiment and took part in the wars in South Ossetia and Abkhazia and the civil conflict that opposed ousted president Zviad Gamsakhurdia and Eduard Shevardnadze. In 2000, he became First Deputy Chief of Staff and served while Georgia took part in the US-led invasion of Iraq and during the Pankisi Gorge crisis.

After a brief departure from service, Chankotadze returned to the military in 2007 and served as the Land Forces' Artillery Brigade Commander during the 2008 Russo-Georgia War. Distinguished for his leadership during the Battle of Tskhinvali, Chankotadze was appointed as Chief of the Joint Staff later that same year, serving until 2012. Under his leadership, Georgia sent a large contingent to participate in the NATO-led ISAF mission in Afghanistan, launched several reforms to address the shortcomings of the war, and increased international cooperation in military education. In 2009, Lieutenant General Chankotadze took part in the response to the Mukhrovani Base mutiny.

Retiring in 2013, Chankotadze reappeared in the public eye as a critique of the Georgian Dream government in 2018. In 2020, he was elected to Parliament on the United National Movement's electoral list, making him the second former Chief of Staff to serve in the 10th Convocation of Parliament (the other being Vladimer Chachibaia).

== Early life and education ==
Devi Chankotadze was born on September 1, 1961, in Gori, a town in then-Soviet Georgia. His father Vakhtang was a scientist. From 1978 to 1982, he was trained at the Tbilisi Artillery School, graduating in Artillery Armament Tactical Command. He has also received high-command courses from China's People's Liberation Army National Defence University in Beijing in 2001. Chankotadze speaks Georgian, English and Russian fluently, while his lack of higher education has been the subject of criticism by political commentators.

== Military career ==
=== Soviet era and national independence ===
Devi Chankotadze served in the Soviet military from 1982, serving until 1989 as Platoon Commander based in the Kharabovsk District. As national militias began to replace the disintegrating Soviet military, Chankotadze became Commander of the Tbilisi battalion of the Shevardeni company, a paramilitary organization that notably remained neutral in the internal conflicts that opposed groups backing Zviad Gamsakhurdia and radical anti-Soviet groups. With the creation of the National Guard shortly before independence in 1991, Shevardeni was integrated into the national forces and Chankotadze became a member of the National Guard. In March 1991, he was appointed as chief of staff to the 11th Battalion of Gori, a key armed formation in the midst of the First South Ossetian War, and kept that position through the coup d'état that overthrew President Gamsakhurdia.

In March 1992, Devi Chankotadze was made head of the National Guard's Artillery Regiment as the country was now led by Eduard Shevardnadze. While war came to an end in South Ossetia in June, a new armed conflict began in Abkhazia in August that would last for more than a year, until the fall of Georgian forces at the hands of Russia-backed separatists in September 1993. This conflict was immediately followed by an armed rebellion in the western Georgian region of Samegrelo, where ousted leader Gamsakhurdia had been challenging the central government. This armed rebellion ended with the death of Gamsakhurdia on December 31, 1993. Chankotadze remained head of the Artillery Regiment until April 1994.

=== Integration with the Ministry of Defense ===
From April 1994 to April 1995, Devi Chankotadze served as Chief of Staff of the Main Division of the National Guard at a time when the armed forces were being reorganized within the Georgian Armed Forces after a series of armed conflicts in the years that followed independence. Commander of the First Artillery Brigade until December 1995, he was then made Commander of the Artillery Brigade of the Reserve of the High Command, a position he held until January 1999. That year, he was promoted to the rank of Major General and became Commander of the Georgian Artillery, as Georgia participated in the NATO-led Kosovo Force.

In 2000, Major General Chankotadze became First Deputy Chief of the General Staff of the Georgian Armed Forces. It was under his term that Georgia launched its participation in the Iraq war, as well as a limited military presence in Afghanistan as part of the war on terror. In May 2002, the United States began its Georgia Train and Equip Program, aimed at increasing Georgian troop readiness, while helping Georgian forces restore order during the Pankisi Gorge crisis. In March–August 2004, after the new government of Mikheil Saakashvili started changing the country's military top brass, he briefly served as the Ministry of Defense's representative at the Military Cooperation Coordination Staff of the CIS, followed by a stint as Military Representative of the MoD's Defense Policy and Euro-Atlantic Integration Department's Defense Attachés Office at the CIS Staff. In November, he would be appointed as Georgia's Defense Attaché to Russia.

He was dismissed from the Georgian Armed Forces on October 25, 2005.

=== 2008 Russo-Georgian War ===
In October 2007, Devi Chankotadze was reintegrated into the military and appointed Artillery Brigade Commander in the Georgian Land Forces. He maintained that post during the 2008 Russo-Georgia War, which began on August 7 as Georgian artillery launched an assault on separatist South Ossetia's capital Tskhinvali in response to Russian-backed bombing campaigns against Georgian villages. The Ministry of Defense of Georgia would later say in a statement to Russian daily Kommersant that he was the military commander "to have best distinguished himself during the hostilities." During the war, he led artillery forces in Tskhinvali and on the road leading to the Roki Tunnel, destroying several Russian columns of tanks coming to reinforce separatist positions. His forces also engaged in combat operations in Gori and other parts of the country to repel Russian forces, before the August 16 ceasefire agreement brought to an end open hostilities.

After President Saakashvili ordered a major army reshuffle to address the shortcomings encountered during the war, Chankotadze was made Deputy Chief of the Joint Staff to replace Alexandre Osepaishvili, while Vakhtang Maisuradze took over as Artillery Brigade Commander. During this time, the Ministry of Defense focused mainly on the reconstruction of Georgian armed forces.

=== As Chief of the Joint Staff ===
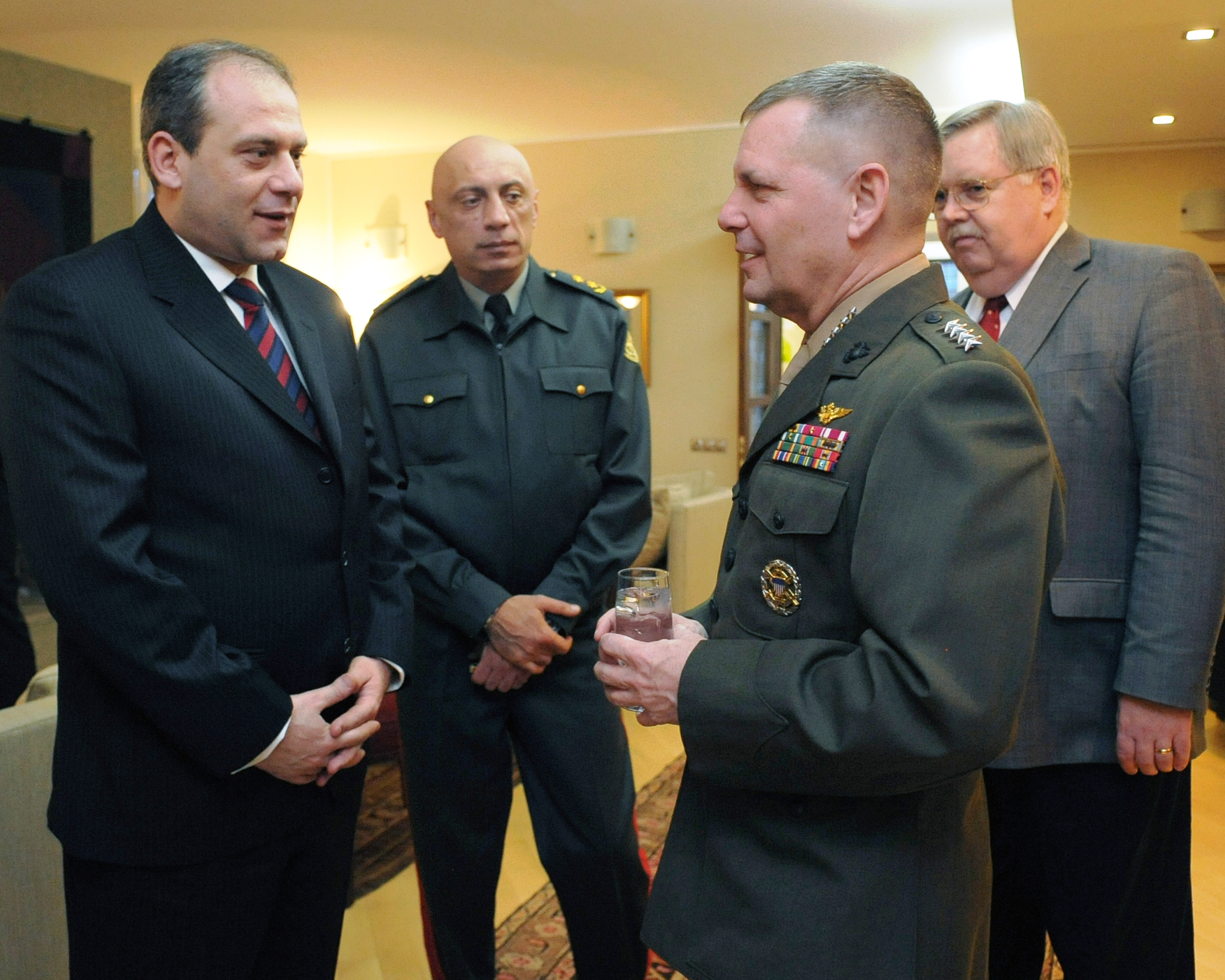
Devi Chankotadze at a meeting of Georgian MOD David Sikharulidze and James Cartwright.

On March 4, 2009, Chankotadze was appointed Chief of Joint Staff of the Georgian Armed Forces, replacing the resigning Vladimer Chachibaia, who allegedly left the post to protest Deputy Defense Minister Bacho Akhalaia's interference in the armed forces' work. As the new commander-in-chief of Georgian forces, he had the task of reorganizing the military after the devastating Russo-Georgian war, while facing depleted resources and a decrease in international arms procurement. On May 5, 2009, a group of soldiers under the leadership of Lieutenant-General Mamuka Gorgiashvili mutinied at the Mukhrovani military base in what authorities would later describe as an attempt to disrupt NATO-led international exercises set to begin the day after. The mutiny was suppressed within the same day after a joint operation by the MoD and Ministry of Internal Affairs.

Nonetheless, Devi Chankotadze implemented a series of reforms aimed at integration Georgia's armed forces to NATO standards. For that matter, he led a series of domestic and international military exercises, including the national Shield 2009 and Cooperative-Longbow 2009. He also opened a new military base in the country, while seeking to boost international cooperation, especially with Poland, Estonia, Germany and the United States, seeking cooperation in military education with the latter states. In March 2012, he invited his Armenian counterpart, Colonel General Yuri Khatchaturov to visit Georgia.

Chankotadze's term in office was characterized by Georgia joining NATO coalition forces in Afghanistan and sending a 173-strong company to fight under French command in Kabul's Camp Warehouse, mainly used to train the Afghan military. The Georgian contingent grew to 1,571 soldiers by October 2012 and was deployed to the high-risk Helmand province in southern Afghanistan, serving alongside the United States Marines. This was in addition to artillery instructions serving in Kandahar in 2011-2012 and liaison officers attached to the Turkish staff in Kabul in 2010–2011. All Georgian troops participating in ISAF had been trained at the Krtsanisi National Training Centre and the Hohenfels Joint Multinational Readiness Center of Germany by US forces since 2009. By the end of Chankotadze's leadership, Georgia had become the largest per-capita contributor to the ISAF mission, retaining that status until the end of the Western mission in 2021. 17 Georgian soldiers died in the fighting while Chankotadze served as commander-in-chief.

The opposition to President Saakashvili routinely criticized Chankotadze's term for the perceived influence of Bacho Akhalaia, who was appointed as Minister of Defense in 2009 and was seen as the real decision-maker in armed forces decisions. On October 8, 2012, Saakashvili replaced Chankotadze with his deputy, Giorgi Kalandadze. Chankotadze retired from the military on April 11, 2013, and received an honorary promotion to the rank of Lieutenant General.

== Political career ==
=== Political activism ===
After several years in retirement, Devi Chankotadze resurfaced in the public view during the 2018 presidential election, recording a video in uniform along with other retired officers from the Mukhatgverdi Brothers' Cemetery, calling on people to vote against Salome Zourabichvili, the Georgian Dream-backed candidate who had made controversial remarks over Georgia's share of the blame of the 2008 Russo-Georgian War. At the time, the Ministry of Defense and the State Service for Veterans Affairs condemned the statement, calling on armed forces and retired officers to not interfere in the electoral processes. Zourabichvili would win the presidency.

Around the same time, he also blasted the Ministry of Justice for making comments about the potential subpoena of active duty officers by the International Criminal Court over its war-related case.

=== Opposition lawmaker ===
Devi Chankotadze joined the United National Movement, an opposition party affiliated with former president Mikheil Saakashvili, ahead of the 2020 parliamentary elections. In that race, he was at first considered as a potential nominee for the Parliament Majoritarian District of Tsqaltubo-Samtredia-Vani-Khoni, although UNM eventually nominated TV anchor Nanuka Zhorzholiani as a candidate, while Chankotadze appeared as 6th on the party's electoral list. During the campaign, the ruling Georgian Dream accused him of conspiring with MP Nika Melia and former UNM government official Dimitri Shashkini to lead provocateurs with "batons and electric shocks" ahead of the polls, allegations that have not been backed by evidence. As massive electoral fraud allegations surfaced, the State Security Service announced opening an investigation on allegations by Georgian Dream MP Irakli Kobakhidze that Chankotadze, Shashkini, and former Prime Minister Vano Merabishvili were plotting a coup d'état, an investigation whose status has remained unknown since then.

Chankotadze was one of 49 elected MPs to refuse to recognize the results of the 2020 elections and boycotted Parliament for several months, until a short-lived EU-facilitated agreement between GD and the opposition put an end to the boycott. He has since then served on the Defense and Security Committee.

As an MP, he has proposed an increase of active duty officers' salaries, which he claims has not increased in a decade. He's also been critical of the Ministry of Defense's low budget on arms procurement. Ahead of the 2021 local elections, he asked NATO Special Representative James Appathurai to ensure a "maximal presence" of foreign observers to watch the polls.

== Awards ==
=== Civilian awards ===
Symbol	Honour	Note
	Presidential Order of Excellence (May 24, 2010)	Awarded by President Mikheil Saakashvili on Georgia's 2010 Independence Day.

=== Military awards ===
Ribbon bar	Country/Entity	Honour
	Georgia	Order of Vakhtang Gorgasali, III Degree (December 18, 1995)
	Georgia	Medal for Meritorious Service in the Ministry of Defense (2008)
	Georgia	St. George's Order of Victory (March 31, 2009)
	Georgia	Order of Vakhtang Gorgasali, I Degree (April 29, 2010)
	Georgia	Devotion to Homeland Military Medal (April 30, 2010)
	Georgia	Kakutsa Choloqashvili Medal (April 30, 2010)
	Georgia	General Kvinitadze Medal (April 30, 2010)
	Georgia	General Mazniashvili Medal (April 30, 2010)
	State of Georgia, United States	The Georgia Commendation Medal
	United States	Legion of Merit, awarded by President Barack Obama in October 2012.
