= Dzneladze =

Dzneladze (Georgian: ძნელაძე) is a Georgian surname. Notable people with the surname include:

- Giorgi Dzneladze (born 1968), retired Georgian professional football player
- Irakli Dzneladze (born 1968), Georgian Brigadier general
- Roman Dzneladze (1933–1966), Soviet olympic wrestler
- Zurab Dzneladze (born 1994), Georgian rugby union player
