= Zaza Chkhaidze =

Georgian major general (born 1974)

Zaza Chkhaidze (Georgian: ზაზა ჩხაიძე; born 25 October 1974) is a Georgian major general (2019), who has served as Deputy Chief of Georgian Defense Forces since 20 December 2018. He also was Chief of General Staff of Georgian Defense Forces from 20 December 2018 to 27 December 2019.

Born in Tbilisi, Georgian SSR, in 1974, Zaza Chkhaidze graduated from the United Military Academy of the Georgian Ministry of Defense in 1998 and joined the Georgian Armed Forces. He had further training as an officer at the National Defense Academy of Georgia in 2011 as well as abroad, including the United States Army War College in 2015–2016. In 1999, he was appointed to the Georgian Special Forces, wherein he became a brigade commander in 2002. His subsequent positions included being the 3rd Infantry Brigade commander (2004–2005), Commander of Logistic Battalion (2006–2007), Chief of G-2 Intelligence Division, 1st Infantry Brigade (2007–2009), Senior Officer, Information-Analytical Section of G-2 Intelligence Division, Staff of Land Forces (2009–2010), 2nd Infantry Brigade commander (2012–2014), Senior Officer, J-2 Intelligence Department (2015–2016), Head of J-2 Intelligence Department (2016), Deputy Chief of General Staff (2016–2018), and Deputy Chief of Georgian Defense Forces and Chief of General Staff of Georgian Defense Forces (2018–2019).

Military offices
Preceded by Vladimer Chachibaia	Chief of General Staff of Georgian Defense Forces; 2018 – 2019	Succeeded by Giorgi Matiashvili
