= Giorgi Kalandadze =

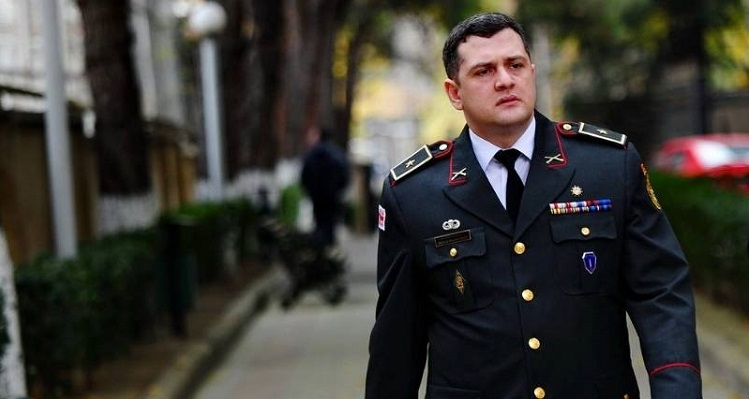
- Brigadier General Giorgi Kalandadze
- Born: June 24, 1980 (age 46)
- Military career
- Allegiance: Georgia
- Branch: Georgian Army
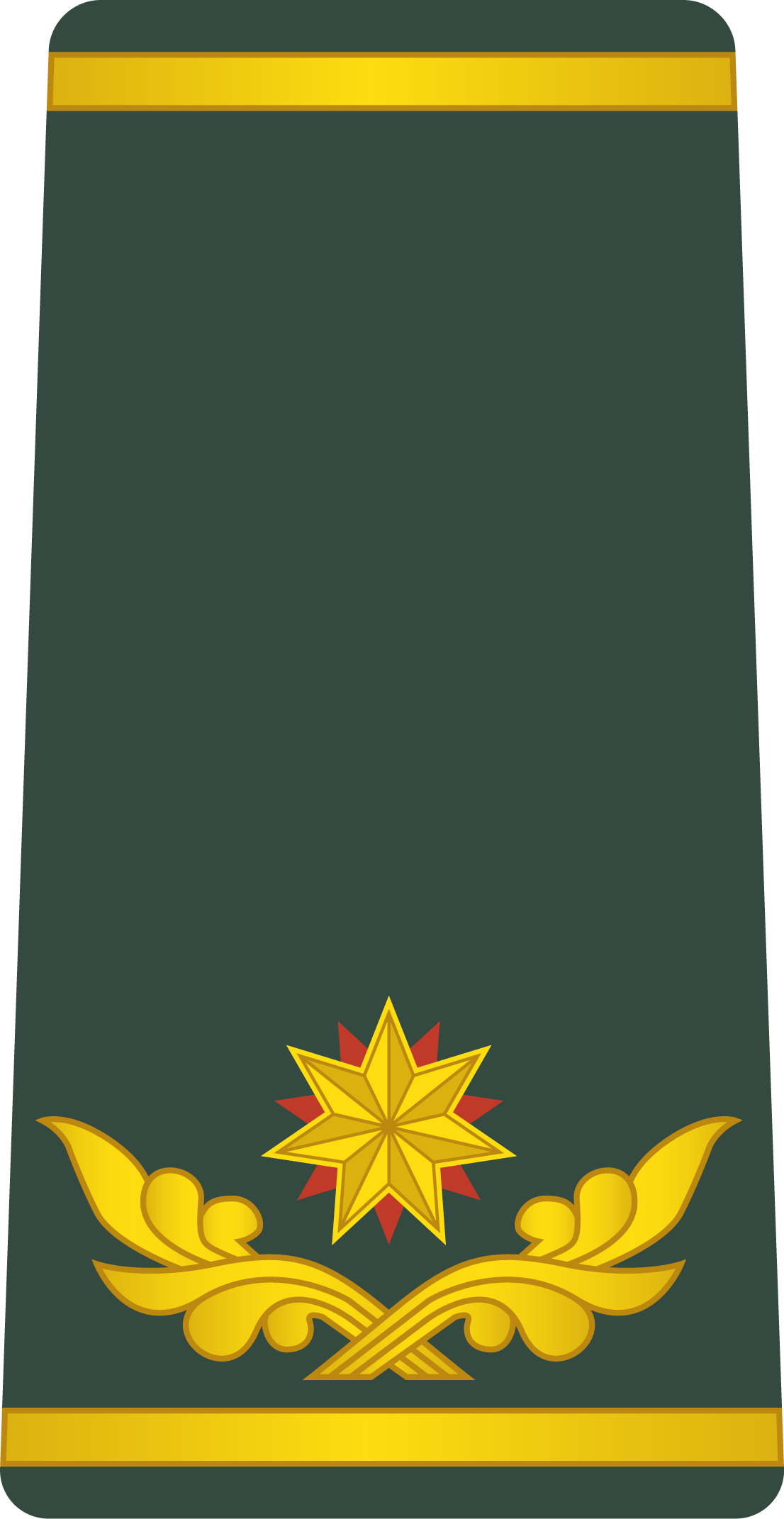
- Rank
- Commands: Georgian Armed Forces
- Conflicts: 2008 South Ossetia War

Giorgi Kalandadze (Georgian: გიორგი კალანდაძე) (born June 24, 1980) is a retired Georgian Brigadier General who was the Chief of Joint Staff of the Georgian Armed Forces from October 8, 2012 to November 11, 2012.

== Career ==
Kalandadze studied at the Cadets' Corps of the Ministry of Defense of Georgia from 1995 to 1997 and at the United Military Academy of the Ministry of Defense from 1997 to 2001. He received further training in the United States in 2005 and Estonia in 2007. From 2007 to 2009, he was the commander of the 4th Infantry Brigade, which suffered the heaviest casualties of all Georgian military units in the 2008 South Ossetia War with Russia.

In 2009 Kalandadze was promoted to the position of deputy commander of the Georgian Land Forces and became first deputy chief of joint staff. Simultaneously, from 2010 to 2011, he served as acting commander of the land forces. In October 2012, President of Georgia Mikheil Saakashvili appointed him Chief of Joint Staff of the Georgian Armed Forces. The appointment came a week after Saakashvili's United National Movement suffered defeat in the parliamentary election. Critics said Kalandadze's promotion was a "political decision". The Georgian media speculated that the appointment was likely to be reconsidered by the incoming government of the Georgian Dream coalition, which favored the candidacy of Vakhtang Kapanadze, a veteran officer and ex-Chief of the General Staff of the Georgian Armed Forces (2004–2005).

== Arrest and dismissal ==
In November 2012, Kalandadze was briefly arrested by Georgia's new government on criminal charges related to exceeding official powers in two separate cases and illegal confinement. He was released on bail and, despite President Saakashvili's support, was suspended from his office by the court on November 11, 2012. Saakashvili's UNM party claimed persecution of Kalandadze was politically motivated as the new Defense Minister "failed to replace him with his loyal figure". Due to these events, a planned NATO Military Committee visit to Georgia was postponed and would not be held until February 2014.

After his dismissal, Kalandadze left Georgia. In 2014, he volunteered to advise the military of Ukraine during the War in Donbass.

== Awards ==
Kalandadze has been awarded by the government of Georgia the Presidential Order of Excellence (2012), Vakhtang Gorgasali Order, 1st Rank (2010), Order of Honor (2010), and several Defense Ministry medals.

Military offices
Preceded by Devi Chankotadze	Chief of Joint Staff of the Georgian Armed Forces; 2012	Succeeded by Irakli Dzneladze
