= Role of Georgia in the War in Afghanistan (2001–2021) =

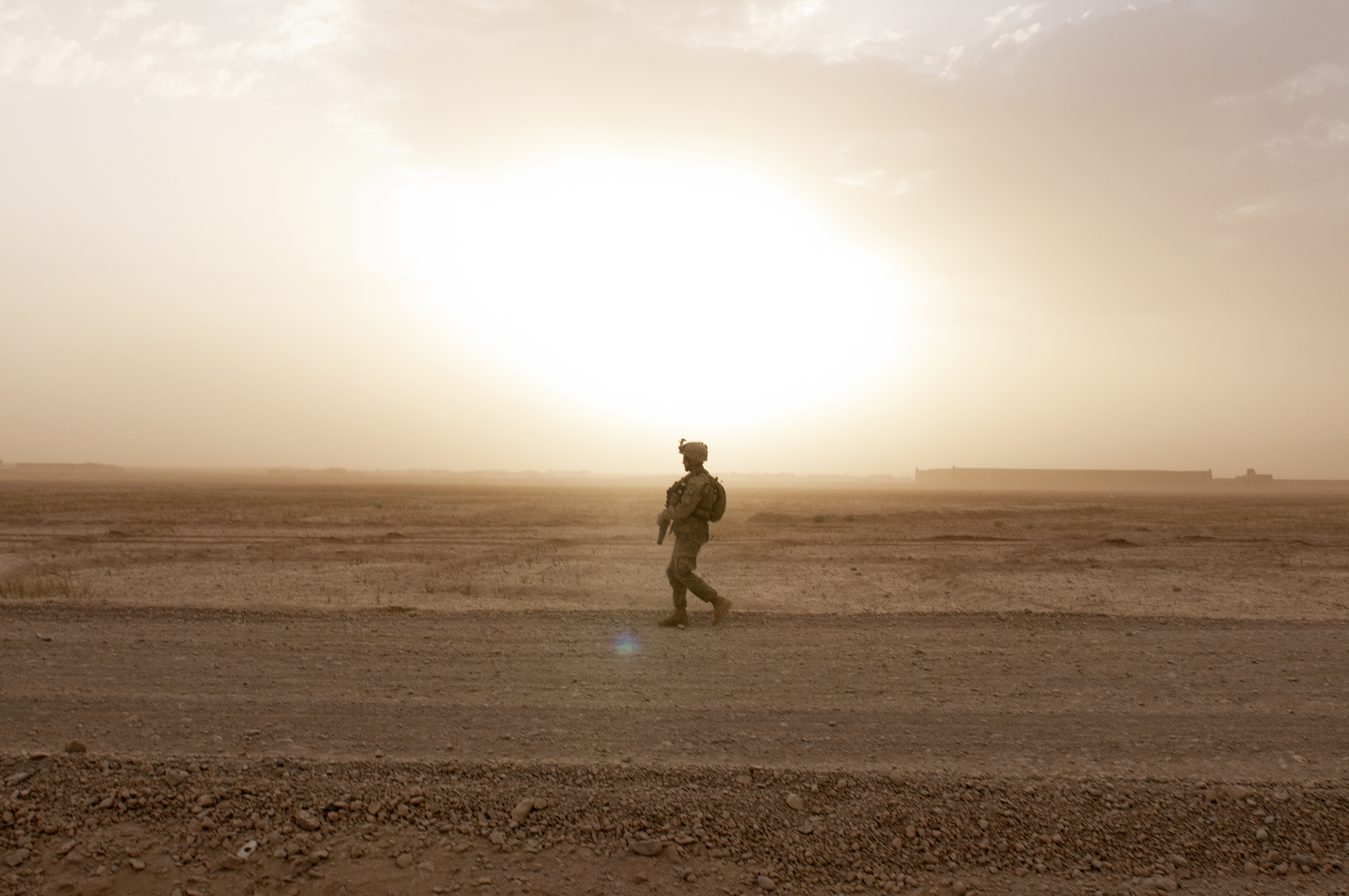
A Georgian soldier with the 31st Georgian Light Infantry Battalion scans for enemy activity while on patrol in the Helmand province. 16 April 2012.

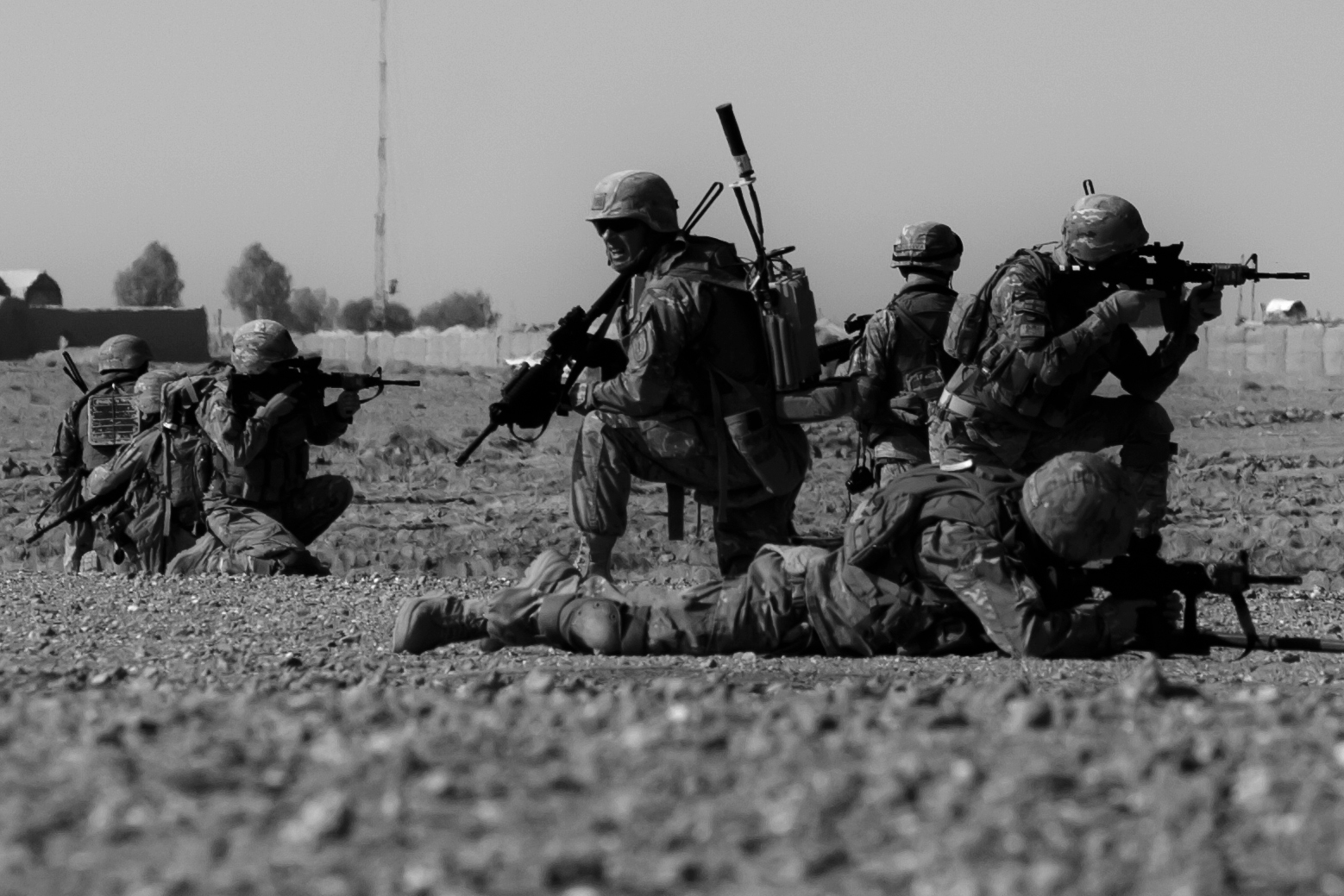
Georgian soldiers with the Batumi Light Infantry Battalion provide 360-degrees of protection during a patrol halt near in the Helmand province in November 2013.

Georgia joined the war in Afghanistan in 2004 and the country had become the largest non-NATO and the largest per capita troop contributor to the International Security Assistance Force in Afghanistan by late 2012, with over 1,560 personnel on the ground as of May 2013. At its peak deployment, Georgia provided two full infantry battalions serving with the United States forces in the Helmand province. Since the beginning of their mission, more than 11,000 Georgian soldiers have served in Afghanistan.

The Georgian mission in Helmand ended in July 2014. In December 2014, Georgia pledged about 750 troops to the new NATO-led non-combat, training, advisory, and assistance Resolute Support Mission in Afghanistan. At various times, the country has also deployed an infantry company serving with the French contingent in Kabul, medical personnel within the Lithuanian Provincial Reconstruction Team in Chaghcharan, and some individual staff officers.

Since 2010, 32 Georgian servicemen have died, all in the Helmand campaign, and 435 wounded, including 35 amputees, as of July 2014.

As of May 2016, Georgia was the third largest contributor, after the United States and Germany, to the Afghanistan mission. It had 861 troops on the ground, deployed in Kabul, at the Bagram Air Field, and Camp Marmal in Mazar-i-Sharif. In total, more than 20,000 Georgian service members served in Afghanistan. The country's deployment ended completely on 21 June 2021.

== Initial involvement, 2004–2009 ==
Georgia, aspiring to accede to the NATO membership, first joined the coalition war efforts in Afghanistan in 2004, when 50 servicemen of the 16th Mountain Battalion were deployed for 100 days under the German command as part of security efforts during the Afghan presidential election in October 2004. In November 2007 Georgian medical personnel joined the Lithuanian-led Provincial Reconstruction Team in Chaghcharan in the Ghor province of central Afghanistan.

On 2 March 2005, the Georgian Foreign Minister Salome Zourabichvili and NATO Secretary General Jaap de Hoop Scheffer signed an agreement in Brussels regarding the provision of Georgia's support to and transit of NATO forces and NATO personnel bound to Afghanistan.

== Troops deployment, 2009–2014 ==
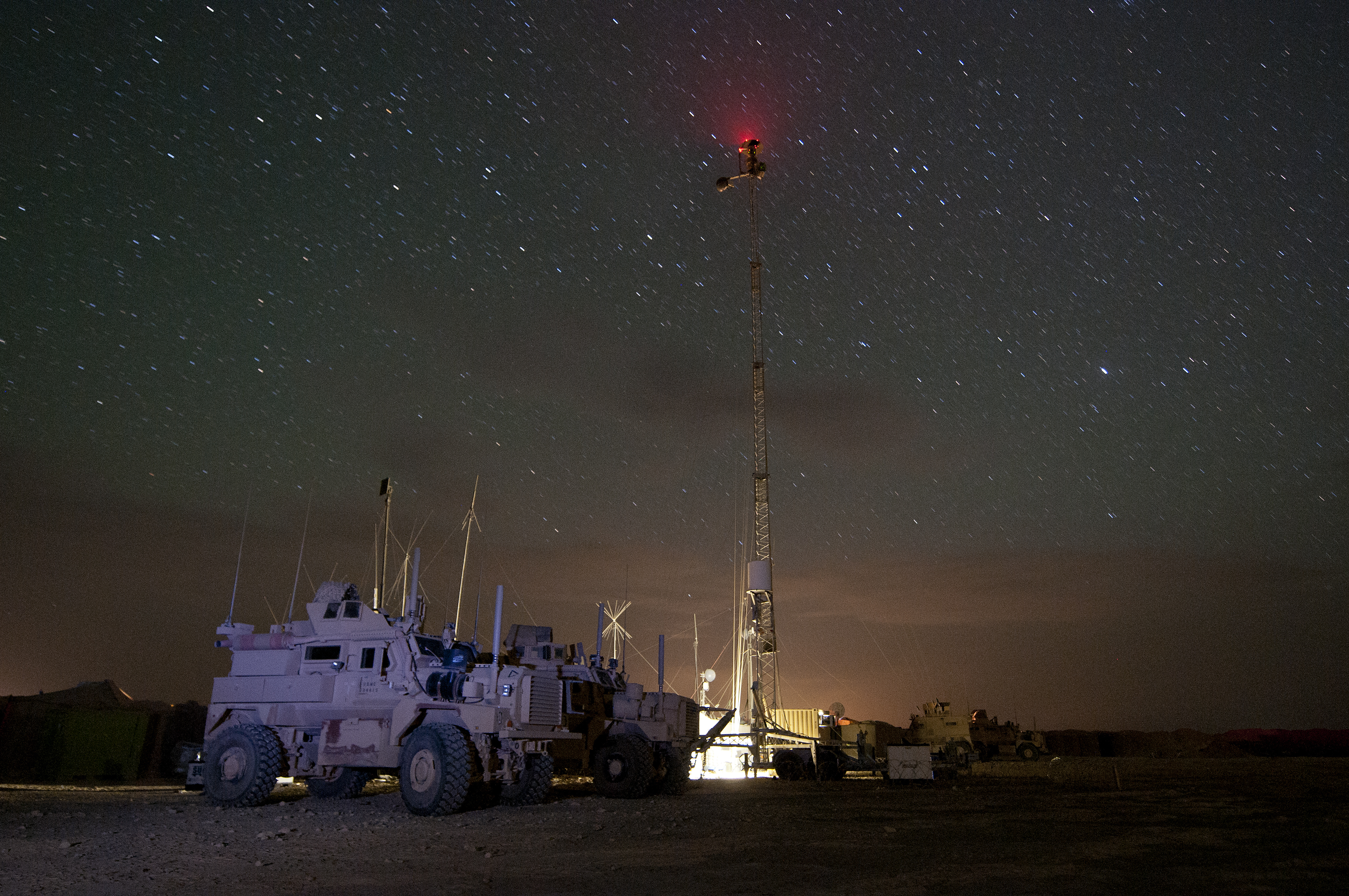
The U.S. and Georgian forces on a patrol base in Helmand province. 17 April 2012.

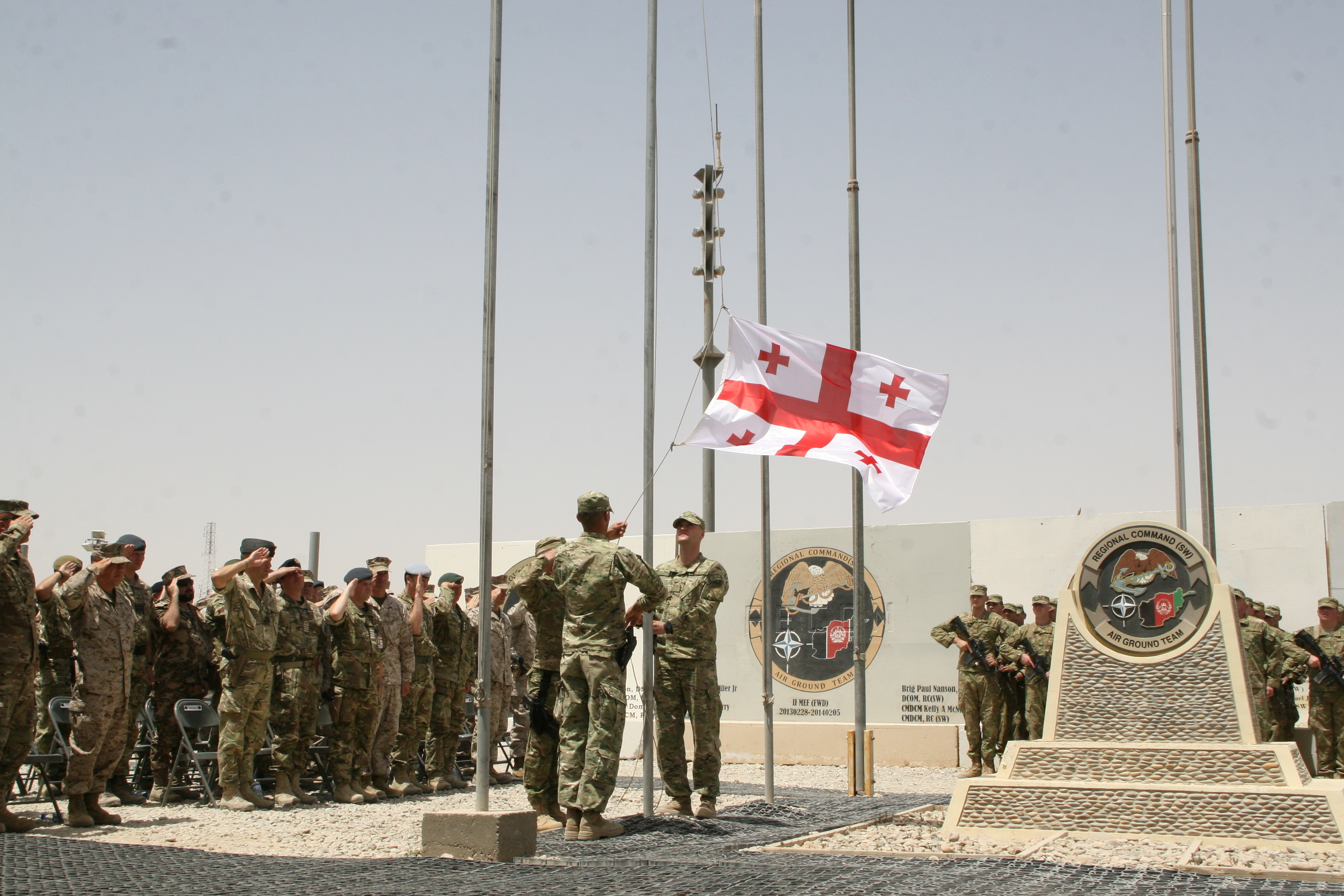
Georgian contingent ends its mission in Helmand province, Afghanistan. 15 July 2014.

Georgia became more energetically involved in the coalition campaign in 2009, when, on 16 October, 173-strong company of the 23rd Battalion, 2nd Infantry Brigade, was sent under the French command to the Camp Warehouse in Kabul. With the planned withdrawal of the French from Afghanistan, in June 2013, this unit, then consisting of 50 soldiers, was redeployed to Camp Phoenix, maintained by the United States Army and used for training of the Afghan military.

Georgia increased its presence to a battalion-size contingent of 749 troops deployed in the volatile Helmand province of south Afghanistan for service with the United States Marines in April 2010, and doubled its contribution to 1,571 soldiers in October 2012. Beyond this, Georgian artillery instructors served with the French contingent in the Kandahar province from April 2011 to April 2012, and two liaison officers were attached to the Turkish staff in Kabul from January 2010 to January 2011. Thereby, by October 2012, Georgia had become one of the largest non-NATO contributors to the ISAF operation together with Australia, whose contribution was an annual average of 1,550.

The Georgian troops deployed in Afghanistan had been trained with the help of the U.S. military within the frame of the Georgia Deployment Program – International Security Assistance Force (GDP–ISAF), launched in 2009, at the Krtsanisi National Training Centre in Georgia and the Joint Multinational Readiness Center in Hohenfels, Germany.

On 15 July 2014, the Georgian troops serving under the Regional Command Southwest ended their four-year deployment in the Helmand province with a flag-lowering ceremony at the Camp Leatherneck. About 50 Georgian troops continue to serve in Kabul and a special mountain battalion is deployed in Kandahar.

== Post-2014 commitment ==
The Georgian Defense Minister Irakli Alasania announced in July 2014 that Georgia would pledge 750 troops to the NATO-led post-2014 non-combat mission in Afghanistan; a company-size unit would be deployed under the German command at Mazar-i-Sharif and rest of the troops would serve under the U.S. command at Bagram. In October 2013, Georgia had also offered NATO to provide training to the Afghan military both in Georgia and on the ground in Afghanistan after the planned withdrawal of the NATO combat mission in 2014. Georgia had some 860 service members as part of the Resolute Support Mission by May 2021, when the Georgian troops began drawdown by withdrawing its company-size unit from Mazar-i-Sharif. On 28 June, the last remaining unit of the Bagram-based 32nd Infantry Battalion, Georgia's Western Command's 3rd Infantry Brigade, returned home.

=== Rotation of Georgian battalions since 2010 ===
1. April 2010 – November 2010: 31st Infantry Battalion, 3rd Infantry Brigade.
2. November 2010 – April 2011: 32nd Infantry Battalion, 3rd Infantry Brigade.
3. April 2011 – November 2011: 33rd Infantry Battalion, 3rd Infantry Brigade.
4. November 2011 – April 2012: 31st Infantry Battalion, 3rd Infantry Brigade.
5. April 2012 – October 2012: 23rd Infantry Battalion, 2nd Infantry Brigade.
6. October 2012 – March 2013: 12th Infantry Battalion, 1st Infantry Brigade, and 32nd Infantry Battalion, 3rd Infantry Brigade.
7. March 2013 – October 2013: 33rd Infantry Battalion, 3rd Infantry Brigade, and 42nd Infantry Battalion, 4th Infantry Brigade.
8. October 2013 – March 2014: 31st Infantry Battalion, 3rd Infantry Brigade, and Separate Batumi Light Infantry Battalion.
9. March 2014 – July 2014: 23rd Infantry Battalion, 2nd Infantry Brigade, Mountain-Intelligence Battalion, and Reinforced Platoon, 13th Infantry Battalion, 1st Infantry Brigade.
10. September 2014 - ?: 51st Light Infantry Battalion, 5th Infantry Brigade.

== Casualties ==
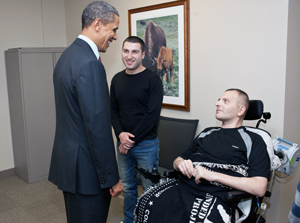
The U.S. President Barack Obama meets LTC Alex Tugushi recuperating at the Walter Reed National Military Medical Center, Bethesda, Maryland. 10 March 2012.

The first Georgian fatality occurred on 5 September 2010. Overall, 32 Georgian soldiers have died and around 280 wounded in Afghanistan as of August 2017. The highest number of Georgian fatalities in a single incident was on 6 June 2013, when an explosive-laden truck hit an outpost of Georgian soldiers in Helmand, killing 7 and injuring 9. On 30 September 2010, when a mine blast killed four servicemen, the highest-ranking Georgian in Afghanistan, Colonel Ramaz Gogiashvili was killed. The largest attack on the area of responsibility of the Georgian forces occurred on 14 May 2013, when a suicide bombing with an explosives-laden truck at the ISAF base at Shir Ghazay, Helmand province, was followed by an attack by a group of insurgents. The Georgians killed all intruders and secured the territory, losing three killed and 27 wounded in the blast.

The Ministry of Defense of Georgia has shown some reluctance to release information about non-fatal casualties. According to the information obtained by the Tbilisi-based Institute for Development of Freedom of Information from the ministry, 23 Georgian servicemen were wounded in 2010, 62 in 2011, 45 in 2012, and 4 more were wounded as of 30 January 2013. The best known survivor is the highly decorated Lieutenant Colonel Alex Tugushi (born 1976), commander of the 31st Infantry Battalion, who lost both legs in a blast in December 2011.

=== Timeline ===
Georgian casualties in Afghanistan by year
Year	KIA	WIA/Injured
2004	–	–
2007	–	–
2009	–	–
2010	5	23
2011	6	62
2012	8	45
2013	10	137
2014	0	7
2015	2	?
2016	0	?
2017	1	?
Grand Total: 32 KIA, >274 WIA/injured

- 5 September 2010 – First Lieutenant Mukhran Shukvani (born 1982), company commander of the 31st Infantry Battalion, was killed as a result of explosion of improvised explosive device.
- 30 September 2010 – Four servicemen with the 31st Infantry Battalion—Colonel Ramaz Gogiashvili (born 1967), Sergeant Davit Tsetskhladze (born 1975), Corporal Giorgi Kolkhitashvili (born 1989) and Corporal Nugzar Kalandadze (born 1989)—were killed in a mine explosion.
- 21 February 2011 – Corporal Giorgi Avaliani (born 1981) of the 32nd Infantry Battalion was killed in the Helmand province.
- 5 March 2011 – Corporal Valeri Verskiani (born 1979) of the 32nd Infantry Battalion was mortally wounded in a mine explosion and died on 14 March 2011, in a hospital in Germany.
- 24 May 2011 – Junior Sergeant Lavrosi Ivaniadze (born 1985) of the 33rd Infantry Battalion was killed in a mine explosion.
- 18 June 2011 – Private Gia Goguadze (born 1990) of the 33rd Infantry Battalion was mortally wounded in an insurgent attack.
- 28 August 2011 – Junior Sergeant Rezo Beridze (born 1979) of the 33rd Infantry Battalion was mortally wounded in an insurgent attack in the Helmand province.
- 30 December 2011 – Corporal Besik Niniashvili (born 1988) of the 31st Infantry Battalion was killed in a mine explosion.
- 6 January 2012 – Corporal Shalva Pailodze (born 1988) of the 31st Infantry Battalion was mortally wounded in an insurgent attack.
- 21 February 2012 – Three Georgian corporals with the 31st Infantry Battalion—Valiko Beraia (born 1987), Ruslan Meladze (born 1991), and Paata Kacharava (born 1975)—were killed in combat in the Helmand province.
- 24 April 2012 – Sergeant Valerian Khujadze (born 1976) of the 31st Infantry Battalion was killed in an improvised explosive device explosion.
- 26 July 2012 – Corporal Givi Pantsulaia (born 1984) of the 31st Infantry Battalion died of wounds suffered as a result of mortar shell explosion in Afghanistan in January 2012.
- 10 October 2012 – Corporal Mindia Abashidze (born 1989) of the 32nd Infantry Battalion was killed in combat.
- 29 December 2012 – Sergeant Giorgi Kikadze (born 1988) of the Artillery Battalion, 2nd Infantry Brigade, missing in action, was found dead, apparently "captured and shot", in the Helmand province.
- 13 May 2013 – Three servicemen from the 42nd Infantry Battalion—Corporal Aleksandre Kvitsinadze (born 1986), Junior Sergeant Zviad Davitadze (born 1979), and Corporal Vladimer Shanava (born 1989)—were killed in an insurgent attack on the ISAF base in Shir Ghazay.
- 6 June 2013 – Seven servicemen from the 42nd Infantry Battalion—corporal Teimuraz Ortavidze (born 1988), corporal Giorgi Adamov (born 1990), private first class Zurab Gurgenashvili (born 1980), private Mikheil Narindoshvili (born 1986), private Boris Tsugoshvili (born 1984), private first class Zviad Sulkhanishvili (born 1990), and private first class Giorgi Guchashvili (born 1990)—were killed in an insurgent attack with a truck bomb on a Patrol Base south of Shir Ghazay, while 9 were injured.
- 8 June 2015 – Corporal Ramaz Davitaia of the 23rd Battalion died from injuries suffered three years prior.
- 23 September 2015 – Private First Class Vasil Kuljanishvili (born 1994) of the 43rd Infantry Battalion, at the Bagram Air Field in the Parwan province, was killed while on patrol.
- 4 August 2017 – Junior Sergeant Mdinari Bebiashvili (born 1991), of the 23rd infantry Battalion, was killed in an insurgent attack on a convoy that also wounded 3 other Georgian soldiers.

== See also ==
- Role of Georgia in the Iraq War
- Georgian Kosovo contingent
- List of wars involving Georgia (country)
