= Chief of General Staff (Georgia) =

Chief of General Staff of Defence Forces of Georgia
- საქართველოს თავდაცვის ძალების გენერალური შტაბის უფროსი
- Standard of Chief of General Staff
- Incumbent; Brigadier general Joni Tatunashvili since 9 July 2020
- Ministry of Defence of Georgia
- Type: Military department
- Member of: General Staff of Georgian Defence Forces
- Reports to: Minister of Defence; Chief of Defence
- Residence: Tbilisi
- Appointer: Minister of Defence of Georgia
- Formation: 1991
- First holder: Jemal Kutateladze

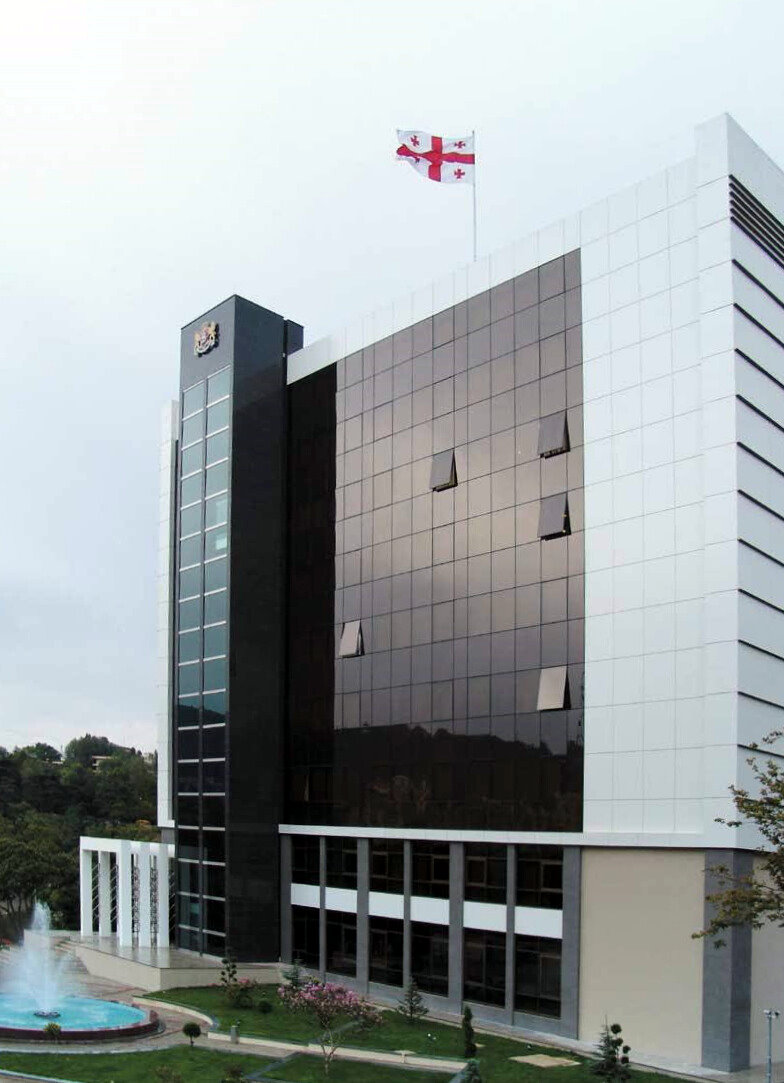
Ministry of Defence headquarters in Tbilisi

The Chief of General Staff of Georgian Defence Forces (Georgian: საქართველოს თავდაცვის ძალების გენერალური შტაბის უფროსი, romanized: sakartvelos tavdatsvis dzalebis generaluri sht'abis uprosi) is a high-ranking officer in the military of Georgia, who heads the General Staff of the Defence Forces of Georgia and is an ex officio Deputy Chief of the Defence Forces. The Chief is appointed by the Minister of Defence and reports to the Minister and Chief of Defence Forces.

== Overview ==
The Chief of General Staff exercises overall leadership of the General Staff and directs its day-to-day activities. The Chief is responsible for the proper execution of the tasks saddled on the General Staff, supervises planning of military operations, oversees coordination among the staffs of various units of the Defence Forces, and performs other functions as defined by the military law.

The Chief of General Staff is also a Deputy Chief of Defence Forces. They are appointed, with no term length, and released of the position by the Minister of Defence of Georgia.

== History ==
The office of the Chief of General Staff was introduced in Georgia following its independence from the Soviet Union in 1991. It has undergone several name changes since then. Prior to the 2018 reforms, the Chief was appointed by the President of Georgia on the advice of the Minister of Defence for a three-year term, with the possibility of extension for one year. The Chief was the highest-ranking military officer in the Georgian military, chief military adviser to the President, and wartime commander of the Armed Forces of Georgia.

== List ==
=== Chief of General Staff of Georgian Armed Forces (1991–2008) ===
For period from 1921 to 1991, see Chief of the General Staff of the Soviet Union.

No.	Portrait	Chief of General Staff	Took office	Left office	Time in office
1	Jemal Kutateladze	Jemal Kutateladze	August 1991	December 1991	4 months
2	Avtandil Tskitishvili	Major general Avtandil Tskitishvili (1950–2013)	January 1992	December 1993	1 year, 11 months
3	Guram Nikolaishvili	Major general Guram Nikolaishvili (born 1952)	December 1993	June 1994	6 months
4	Nodar Tatarashvili	Major general Nodar Tatarashvili (born 1941)	June 1994	June 1996	2 years
5	Zurab Meparishvili	Major general Zurab Meparishvili (born 1934)	June 1996	May 1998	1 year, 11 months
6	Joni Pirtskhalaishvili	Lieutenant general Joni Pirtskhalaishvili (born 1947)	May 1998	September 2003	5 years, 4 months
7	Givi Iukuridze	Givi Iukuridze (born 1956)	February 2004	25 August 2004	6 months
8	Vakhtang Kapanadze	Major general Vakhtang Kapanadze (born 1960)	25 August 2004	18 February 2005	5 months
9	Levan Nikoleishvili	Major general Levan Nikoleishvili	18 February 2005	2 November 2006	1 year, 8 months
10	Zaza Gogava	Major general Zaza Gogava (born 1971)	2 November 2006	4 November 2008	2 years

=== Chief of Joint Staff of Georgian Armed Forces (2008–2013) ===
No.	Portrait	Chief of Joint Staff	Took office	Left office	Time in office
1	Vladimer Chachibaia	Major general Vladimer Chachibaia (born 1971)	4 November 2008	5 March 2009	121 days
2	Devi Chankotadze	Major general Devi Chankotadze (born 1961)	5 March 2009	8 October 2012	3 years, 217 days
3	Giorgi Kalandadze	Brigadier general Giorgi Kalandadze (born 1980)	8 October 2012	11 November 2012	34 days
–	Vakhtang Kapanadze	Major general Vakhtang Kapanadze (born 1960); Acting	11 November 2012	4 December 2012	23 days
4	Irakli Dzneladze	Colonel; Irakli Dzneladze (born 1968)	4 December 2012	22 November 2013	353 days

=== Chief of General Staff of Georgian Armed Forces (2013–2018) ===
No.	Portrait	Chief of General Staff	Took office	Left office	Time in office	Ref.
1	Vakhtang Kapanadze	Major general Vakhtang Kapanadze (born 1960)	22 November 2013	22 November 2016	3 years, 0 days	—
2	Vladimer Chachibaia	Major general Vladimer Chachibaia (born 1971)	22 November 2016	20 December 2018	2 years, 28 days	

=== Chief of General Staff of Georgian Defence Forces (2018–present) ===
No.	Portrait	Chief of General Staff	Took office	Left office	Time in office	Ref.
1	Zaza Chkhaidze	Major General; Zaza Chkhaidze (born 1974)	20 December 2018	27 December 2019	1 year, 7 days	-
2	Giorgi Matiashvili	Brigadier General; Giorgi Matiashvili (born 1977)	27 December 2019	1 July 2020	187 days	
3	Joni Tatunashvili	Brigadier General; Joni Tatunashvili (born 1976)	9 July 2020	Incumbent	6 years, 60 days	-
