= Vladimer Chachibaia =

Georgian general (born 1971)

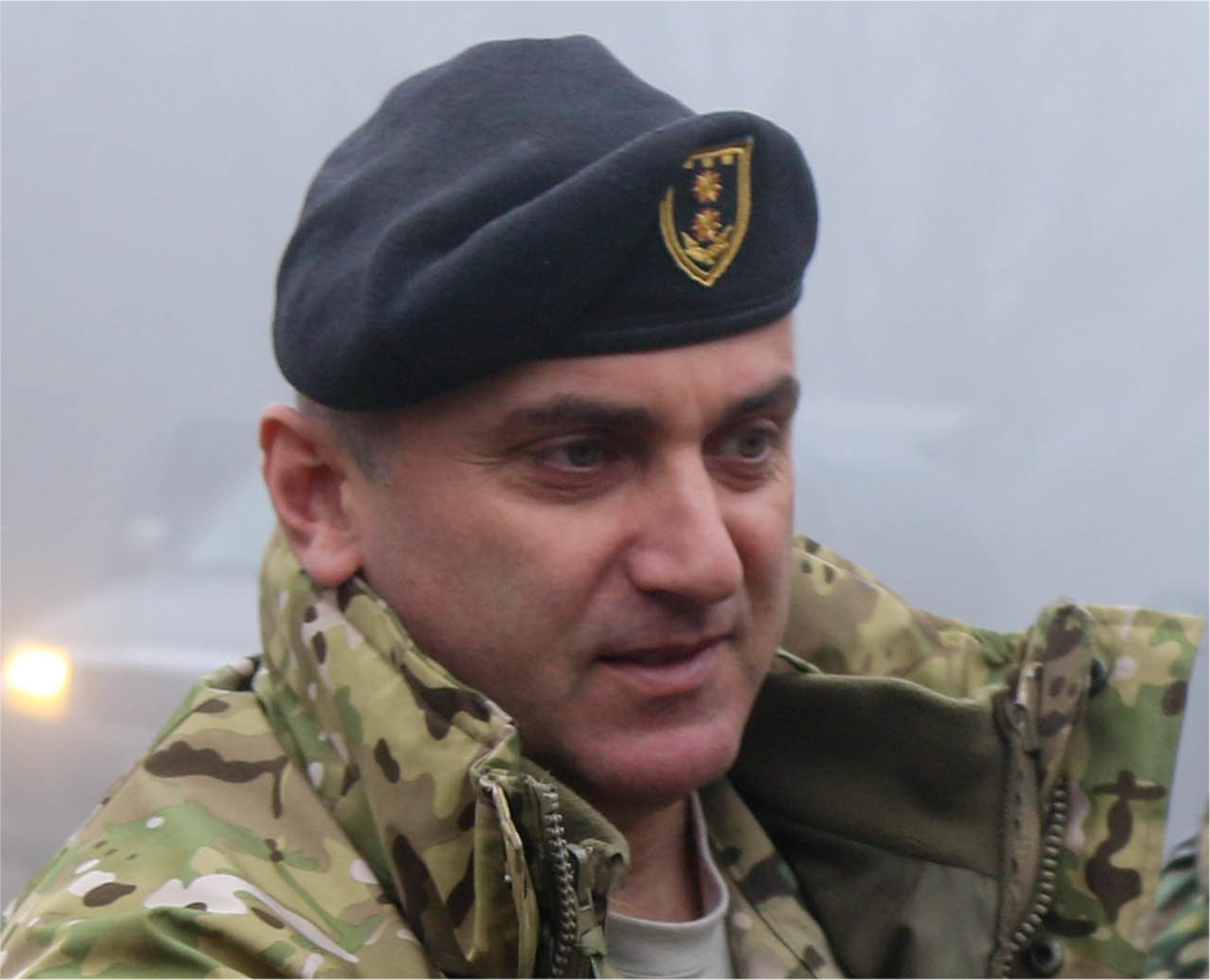
- Vladimer Chachibaia as Major General
- Born: November 4, 1971 (age 54)
- Military career
- Allegiance: Georgia
- Rank: Lieutenant general
- Commands: Defense Forces of Georgia

Vladimer Chachibaia (Georgian: ვლადიმერ ჩაჩიბაია) (born 4 November 1971) is a Georgian lieutenant general and politician who has served as the Advisor to the Prime Minister of Georgia on Defense and Security Affairs since 2023. He previously serves as the Chief of Georgian Defense Forces from 20 December 2018 to 1 July 2020 and was a member of Parliament of Georgia from 11 December 2020 to 24 March 2023. His previous top commanding positions included being the Chief of Joint Staff (4 November 2008 – 5 March 2009) and Chief of General Staff of the Georgian Armed Forces (22 November 2016 – 20 December 2018).

== Education and early career ==
Chachibaia was a private in the Soviet Air Forces from 1989 until 1991, when he joined the newly established National Guard of Georgia as a NCO. He commanded a National Guard platoon in the Georgian Civil War of 1992-1993 and continued his service in the Georgian army as a reconnaissance and special task force officer. He studied at the United Military Academy in Tbilisi, Georgia from 1993 to 1994 and attended several courses of military training in the United States, including at the United States Army War College in the years 2007–2008; he was added to the United States Army Command and General Staff College's International Hall of Fame in 2018.

== Command ==
Chachibaia commanded a Georgian contingent within the Multinational force in Iraq in 2004 and was appointed a commander of the 3rd Infantry Brigade of the Armed Forces of Georgia in 2005. He has since served in the General Staff and was an acting commander of the Georgian Land Forces in 2006. Having briefly served as Head of Education Department of the General Staff in September–November 2008, Chachibaia replaced General Zaza Gogava as the Chief of JS GAF after the August 2008 war with Russia. He briefly served as Deputy Defense Minister in 2009 and became Deputy Chief of General Staff of Georgian Armed Forces in 2012. In 2014 he was promoted to the rank of brigadier-general. In October 2015, Chachibaia was appointed as High Military Adviser of the United Nations Assistance Mission in Afghanistan (UNAMA). From November 2015 to August 2016, he was Rector of the National Defense Academy. He then served as Deputy Chief of General Staff and became Chief of General Staff in November 2016, succeeding General Vakhtang Kapanadze. On 20 December 2018, he became the first holder of the recently created position of the Chief of Georgian Defense Forces.

Military offices
Preceded by Zaza Gogava	Chief of Joint Staff of the Georgian Armed Forces; 2008 – 2009	Succeeded by Devi Chankotadze
Preceded by Batu Kutelia	First Deputy Defense Minister; 2009	Succeeded by Nodar Kharshiladze
Preceded by Vakhtang Kapanadze	Chief of General Staff of Georgian Armed Forces / Defense Forces; 2016 – 2018	Succeeded by Zaza Chkhaidze
Preceded by Created	Chief of Georgian Defense Forces; 2018 – 2020	Succeeded by Giorgi Matiashvili
