= Levan Nikoleishvili =

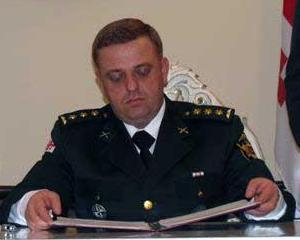
Levan Nikoleishvili

Levan Nikoleishvili (Georgian: ლევან ნიკოლეიშვილი, born 1967) is a retired Georgian colonel who served as the Chief of the General Staff of the Georgian Armed Forces from February 2005 to November 2006. He then served as a deputy defense minister until his resignation in August 2007.

Military offices
Preceded by Vakhtang Kapanadze	Chief of General Staff of the Georgian Armed Forces; 2005 – 2006	Succeeded by Zaza Gogava
