= Georgian Kosovo contingent =

Georgian Kosovo Contingent
- Active: 1999–2008
- Country: Georgia
- Allegiance: Kosovo Force (KFOR)
- Branch: Georgian Armed Forces
- Type: platoon, then company
- Size: 34, then 150
- Garrison/HQ: Mamuša, Prizren

The Georgian Kosovo Contingent (Georgian: ქართული სამხედრო კონტინგენტი კოსოვოში) was a Georgian military deployment, from 1999 to 2008, as part of the NATO-led international peacekeeping force—Kosovo Force—which was responsible for establishing secure environment in Kosovo. It set the first precedent for Georgian participation in international peacekeeping operations. The day of departure of the first Georgian peacekeeping troops to Kosovo, 31 August, was established by the Defense Ministry of Georgia as the Day of Georgian Peacekeepers in 2016.

The first Georgian unit, a platoon of 34 special forces troops, arrived in Kosovo in 1999 and was stationed in Mamuša as part of the Turkish peacekeeping battalion. In 2003, a Georgian company of 150 personnel was deployed in Prizren under the German command. The Georgian troops were withdrawn from Kosovo in April 2008. As the Georgian officials stated the decision to withdraw the peacekeepers was made in view of NATO's other international priorities as Georgia was preparing for a larger-scale deployment in Afghanistan.

== See also ==
- Georgian Iraqi contingent
- Georgian Afghanistan contingent
