= Zurab Meparishvili =

Georgian general (born 1934)

Zurab Meparishvili (Georgian: ზურაბ მეფარიშვილი; born 25 August 1934) is a retired Georgian general who served as the Chief of General Staff of the Georgian Armed Forces from June 1996 to May 1998.

A Batumi native, Meparishvili was promoted to the rank of major-general in 1996 and to that of lieutenant-general in 1997. Meparishvili served as the Chief of General Staff of the Georgian Armed Forces from June 1996 until being relieved by the new Defense Minister David Tevzadze of his duties in May 1998. He was also a deputy defense minister under Tevzadze's predecessor, Vardiko Nadibaidze, for the duration of whose absence on medical leave he was an acting minister in 1997. In 1998, he was involved in talk with Russia on handing over 10 Russian military bases and facilities to the Georgian military.

Military offices
Preceded by Nodar Tatarashvili	Chief of General Staff of the Georgian Armed Forces; 1996–1998	Succeeded by Joni Pirtskhalaishvili
