= Giorgi Matiashvili =

Georgian major general (born 1977)

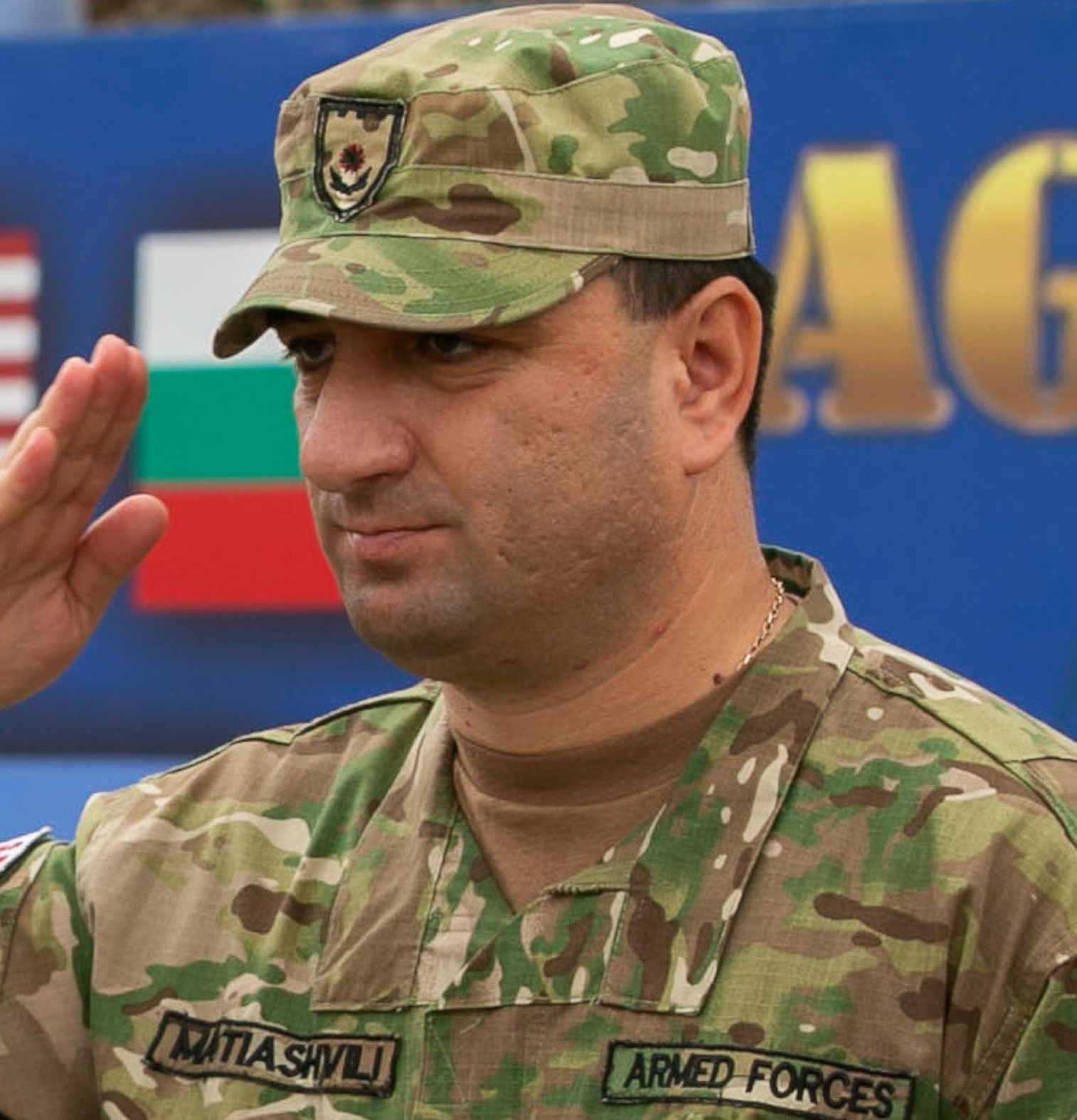
- Giorgi Matiashvili as Brigadier general
- Born: 18 December 1977 (age 48); Gardabani, Georgian SSR, USSR
- Military career
- Allegiance: Georgia
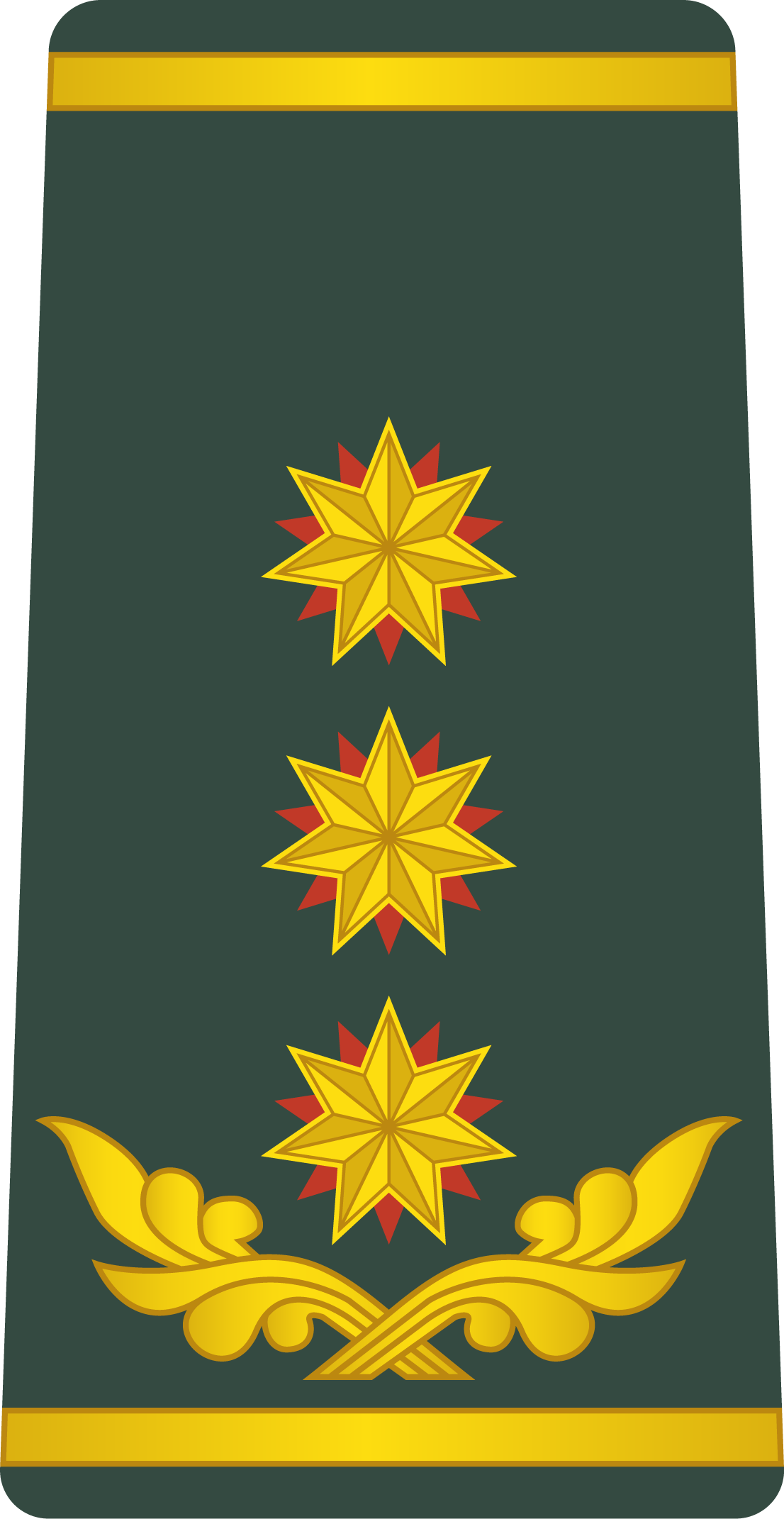
- Rank: Lieutenant general
- Commands: Defence Forces of Georgia

Giorgi Matiashvili (Georgian: გიორგი მათიაშვილი; born 18 December 1977) is a Georgian lieutenant general and the incumbent Chief of Defence Forces of Georgia, appointed on 1 July 2020.

Born in the town of Gardabani, Matiashvili graduated from the United Military Academy of the Ministry of Defence of Georgia in 1999. He served as Deputy Commander of the East Command of the Land Forces from 2016 to 2018 and Commander of the West Command of Defence Forces from 2016 to 2018. In December 2019, he became Deputy Chief of Defence Forces and Chief of the General Staff. On 1 July 2020, he succeeded Lt-Gen Vladimer Chachibaia as Chief of Georgian Defence Forces.

== Awards ==
Matiashvili's awards include:

- The Vakhtang Gorgasali Order, III Class
- Medal for “Irreproachable Service in the System of the Ministry of Defence of Georgia”, I & II Class
- Order of Honor
- "Kakutsa Cholokashvili" Medal
- "General Mazniashvili" Medal
- "Devoted to Motherland" Medal
- "Devoted to Motherland" (20 and more years of irreproachable service) Medal
- “General Kvinitadze” Medal
- NATO Medal for Kosovo

Military offices
Preceded by Zaza Chkhaidze	Chief of General Staff of Georgian Defence Forces; 2019 – 2020	Succeeded by Joni Tatunashvili
Preceded by Vladimer Chachibaia	Chief of Georgian Defense Forces; 2020 –	Succeeded by Incumbent
