= Givi Iukuridze =

Georgian general

Givi Iukuridze (Georgian: გივი იუკურიძე) (born 1956) is a retired Georgian major general who served as the Chief of the General Staff of the Georgian Armed Forces from February to August 2004.

Prior to his appointment in the General Staff in February 2004, Iukuridze served as the head of the Main Military Inspectorate. He was dismissed as the Chief of the General Staff soon after the renewed clashes with separatists in South Ossetia. Mikheil Saakashvili, President of Georgia, said that Russia-educated Iukuridze could no more head the military which was adopting NATO standards. According to the Georgian media speculations, the deaths of 16 Georgian servicemen in South Ossetia was the real reason of Iukuridze's dismissal. Afterwards, Iukurdze was a military attaché to Russia.

Military offices
Preceded by Joni Pirtskhalaishvili	Chief of General Staff of the Georgian Armed Forces; 2004	Succeeded by Vakhtang Kapanadze
