= Guram Nikolaishvili =

Georgian general

Guram Nikolaishvili (Georgian: გურამ ნიკოლაიშვილი; born 3 November 1952) is a retired Georgian general who briefly served as the Chief of General Staff of the Georgian Armed Forces from 1993 to 1994.

Nikolaishvili was born in Kobuleti. He was educated at the Artillery College in Tbilisi and graduated from the Kalinin Military Academy in Leningrad in 1989. He joined the Soviet army in 1974, rising to the rank of colonel. In the last years of the Soviet Union, he commanded a regiment at the Akhalkalaki military base. In 1992, he transferred his allegiance to an independent Georgia. He was promoted to the rank of major-general in 1993 and to that of lieutenant-general in 1996. During these years, he served, successively, as the commander of 11th Motor Rifle Brigade, head of the Chief Operational Directorate, chief of General Staff, and First Deputy Defense Minister of Georgia. Throughout his career in the Georgian service, Nikolaishvili had to deal with the pressures of a civil unrest, secessionist conflict in Abkhazia, and Russian military presence. His last appointment was as military attache to Russia, of which he was relieved in 1999 by President Eduard Shevardnadze after the confiscation of the Georgian military items, returning from the EXPOMIL-99 arms fair in Romania, by the Russian customs. Nikolaishvili retired in 2000.

Military offices
Preceded by Avtandil Tskitishvili	Chief of General Staff of the Georgian Armed Forces; 1993–1994	Succeeded by Nodar Tatarashvili
