= Nodar Tatarashvili =

Georgian general (born 1941)

Nodar Tatarashvili (Georgian: ნოდარ თათარაშვილი; born 1941) is a retired Georgian general who served as the Chief of General Staff of the Georgian Armed Forces from January 1994 to June 1996.

Tatarashvili was promoted to the rank of major-general in 1994 and to that of lieutenant-general in 1996. He served as commander of a Georgian peacekeeping contingent in South Ossetia before being moved to the post of the Chief of General Staff in January 1994. In June 1996, he was succeeded by Major-General Zurab Meparishvili.

Military offices
Preceded by Guram Nikolaishvili	Chief of General Staff of the Georgian Armed Forces; 1994–1996	Succeeded by Zurab Meparishvili
