= Avtandil Tskitishvili =

Georgian general

Avtandil Tskitishvili (Georgian: ავთანდილ ცქიტიშვილი; 26 July 1950 – 9 December 2013) was a Georgian general who served as the Chief of General Staff of the Georgian Armed Forces from January 1992 to December 1993.

Tskitishvili was born in Marneuli in 1950. He graduated from the Tbilisi Artillery College in 1972 and the Leningrad Artillery Academy in 1980. He served in the army of the Soviet Union, rising to the rank of colonel in 1985. After the retirement from the Soviet military in 1991, he was instrumental in founding the National Guard of Georgia and took command of its 1st Brigade. In August 1991, he was appointed First Deputy Commander of the National Guard. He became Chief of General Staff of the Georgian military and First Deputy Defense Minister of Georgia after the overthrow of President Zviad Gamsakhurdia in January 1992. He was promoted to the rank of major-general in August 1992. With Georgia descending into chaos of a civil war and military collapse, Tskitishvili, with his Russian counterpart General Mikhail Kolesnikov signed in Moscow, on 9 October 1993, a Russian-Georgian treaty, granting to Russia several key military bases and facilities in Georgia.

In December 1993, Brigadier General Tskitishvili resigned as a reaction to the military setback in Abkhazia and he was succeeded by Major-General Guram Nikolaishvili. In 1996 he resumed military service, being promoted to the rank of major-general and appointed chief of staff of the border forces. In 2000, Tskitishvili retired and became actively involved in veteran organizations. He returned to state service once again in 2013 and was appointed adviser to the head of Department of Veteran Affairs of the General Staff of the Georgian Armed Forces. He was awarded the Order of Vakhtang Gorgasali, 3rd Rank, and other Georgian and foreign military decorations.

Military offices
Preceded by Jemal Kutateladze	Chief of General Staff of the Georgian Armed Forces; 1992–1993	Succeeded by Guram Nikolaishvili
