= General Staff of the Defence Forces of Georgia =

Military staff of the Defence Forces of Georgia

The General Staff of the Defence Forces of Georgia (Georgian: საქართველოს თავდაცვის ძალების გენერალური შტაბი, romanized: sakartvelos tavdatsvis dzalebis generaluri sht'abi) is the chief military staff of the Defence Forces of Georgia. It is a structural subunit of the Ministry of Defence of Georgia and reports to the Minister of Defence and the Chief of Defence Forces of Georgia. The General Staff's principal responsibility is to aid the Chief of Defence in their various tasks of military management and operational control of the Defence Forces. The General Staff is headed by the Chief of General Staff of Georgian Defence Forces, who is an ex officio Deputy Chief of the Defence Forces. They are appointed by the Minister of Defence of Georgia.

== History ==
The position of the General Staff of the Armed Forces of Georgia was introduced in 1991. It was named General Staff of Georgian Armed Forces until 2008, Joint Staff of Georgian Armed Forces from 2008 to 2013, again General Staff of Georgian Armed Forces from to 2018, when the current naming—General Staff of the Defence Forces—was adopted.

== Functions ==
The General Staff of the Defence Forces of Georgia is principally tasked with aiding the Chief of Defence Forces of Georgia in their various functions. The General Staff is, thus, responsible for:

- participation in planning of defence policy and assessing military threats,
- development of the command structure,
- establishment of a plan of recruitment and schedule for recruits,
- regulation of training of the military,
- planning education and training,
- other tasks determined by military law.

== Structure ==
The General Staff includes the following structural subdivisions:

- J-1 Department of Human Resources
- J-2 Intelligence Department
- J-3 Department of Operational Planning
- J-4 Department of Logistical Planning
- J-5 Department of Strategic Planning
- J-6 Department of Communications and Information Systems
- J-7 Department of Education and Combat Training
- Administration Department
- Directorate of Monitoring Combat Readiness
- Directorate of Arms Control and Verification
- Medical Department
- Center for Control of Military Personnel
- Center for Communications
- Information Technologies Service
