= Chief of Defence Forces (Georgia) =

Commander of the Defence Forces of Georgia

Chief of Defence Forces of Georgia
- საქართველოს თავდაცვის ძალების მეთაური
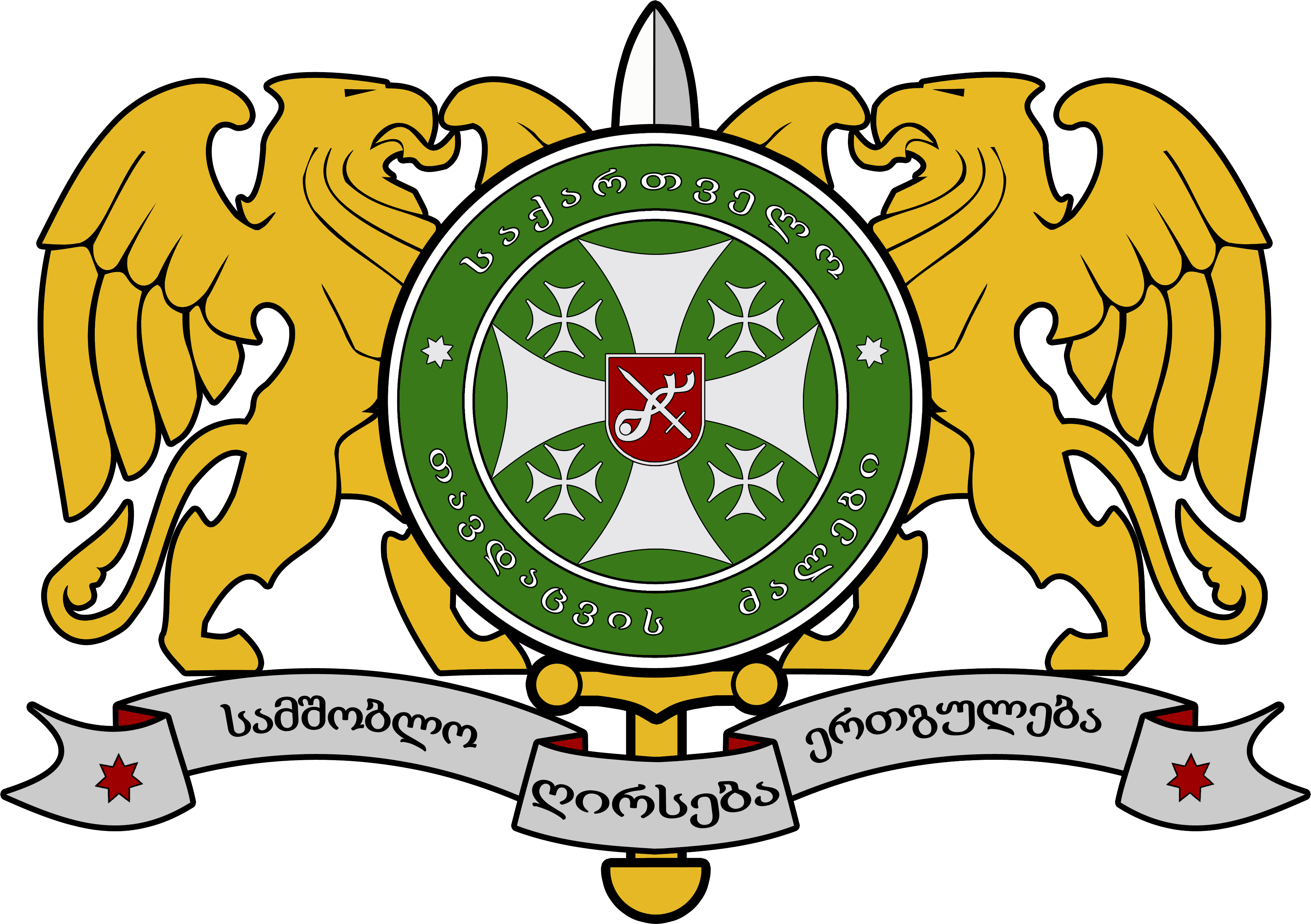
- Coat of Arms of the Defence Forces

- Flag of the Defence Forces
- Incumbent; Lieutenant General Giorgi Matiashvili since 1 July 2020
- Ministry of Defence of Georgia; Defence Forces of Georgia
- Member of: National Security Council
- Reports to: Minister of Defence; Prime Minister; President
- Residence: Tbilisi
- Appointer: President of Georgia on the advice of the Prime Minister
- Term length: No fixed term
- Constituting instrument: Constitution of Georgia; Law on Defence of Georgia
- Precursor: Chief of General Staff
- Formation: 31 October 2018
- First holder: Vladimer Chachibaia
- Deputy: Chief of General Staff

The Chief of Georgian Defence Forces (Georgian: საქართველოს თავდაცვის ძალების მეთაური, romanized: sakartvelos tavdatsvis dzalebis metauri) is a chief of defence and commander of the Defence Forces of Georgia, under the authority of the Government of Georgia.

== History ==
The position was (re)introduced in accordance with the Georgian Law on Defence of 31 October 2018. It had its precursor—the Commander-in-Chief of the Army—in the Democratic Republic of Georgia from 1918 to 1921. From the 1990s until 2018 the Chief of the General Staff was the highest-ranking military officer in the Georgian military, chief military adviser to the President, and wartime commander of the Armed Forces of Georgia.

The first holder of the position was Lieutenant General Vladimer Chachibaia. The incumbent is Lieutenant General Giorgi Matiashvili.

== Functions and responsibilities ==
The Chief of Georgian Defence Forces is a chief military officer in the Georgian Defence Forces (GDF). They manage the Defence Forces, including to execute the orders of the Prime Minister and the Defence Minister and oversee the coherence of the armed forces organization, combat readiness and mobilization as well as military development of the GDF, and are responsible for conduct of operations in war, including plans of use, general articulation of forces, and distribution of operational means between various groups of forces. The Chief of Georgian Defence Forces is aided, in their functions, by the General Staff of the Georgian Defence Forces. One of the Chief's deputies can, simultaneously, serve as the Chief of the General Staff.

The Chief of Georgian Defence Forces is appointed and dismissed by the President of Georgia (on the advice of the Prime Minister) after the candidacy has been nominated by the Minister of Defence and submitted to the Presidency by the Government of Georgia. The nominee must have the highest military rank and high military education. The Chief reports to the Minister of Defence, the Prime Minister, and the President.

== List ==
=== Commanders-in-Chief of the Democratic Republic of Georgia (1918–1921) ===
No.	Portrait	Commander in Chief	Took office	Left office	Time in office
1	Giorgi Kvinitadze	Major general Giorgi Kvinitadze (1874–1970)	26 May 1918	13 December 1920	2 years, 201 days
2	Ilia Odishelidze	General of the army Ilia Odishelidze (1865–1924)	13 December 1920	16 February 1921	65 days
(1)	Giorgi Kvinitadze	Major general Giorgi Kvinitadze (1874–1970)	16 February 1921	17 March 1921	29 days

=== Chiefs of Georgian Defence Forces (Since 2018) ===
No.	Portrait	Chiefs of Defence Forces	Took office	Left office	Time in office	Ref.
1	Vladimer Chachibaia	Lieutenant general Vladimer Chachibaia (born 1971)	20 December 2018	1 July 2020	1 year, 194 days	
2	Giorgi Matiashvili	Lieutenant general Giorgi Matiashvili (born 1977)	1 July 2020	Incumbent	6 years, 68 days	
