= Krtsanisi National Training Centre =

Training facility in Georgia

Training and Military Education Support Centre "Krtsanisi"
- Gardabani Municipality, Kvemo Kartli, Georgia
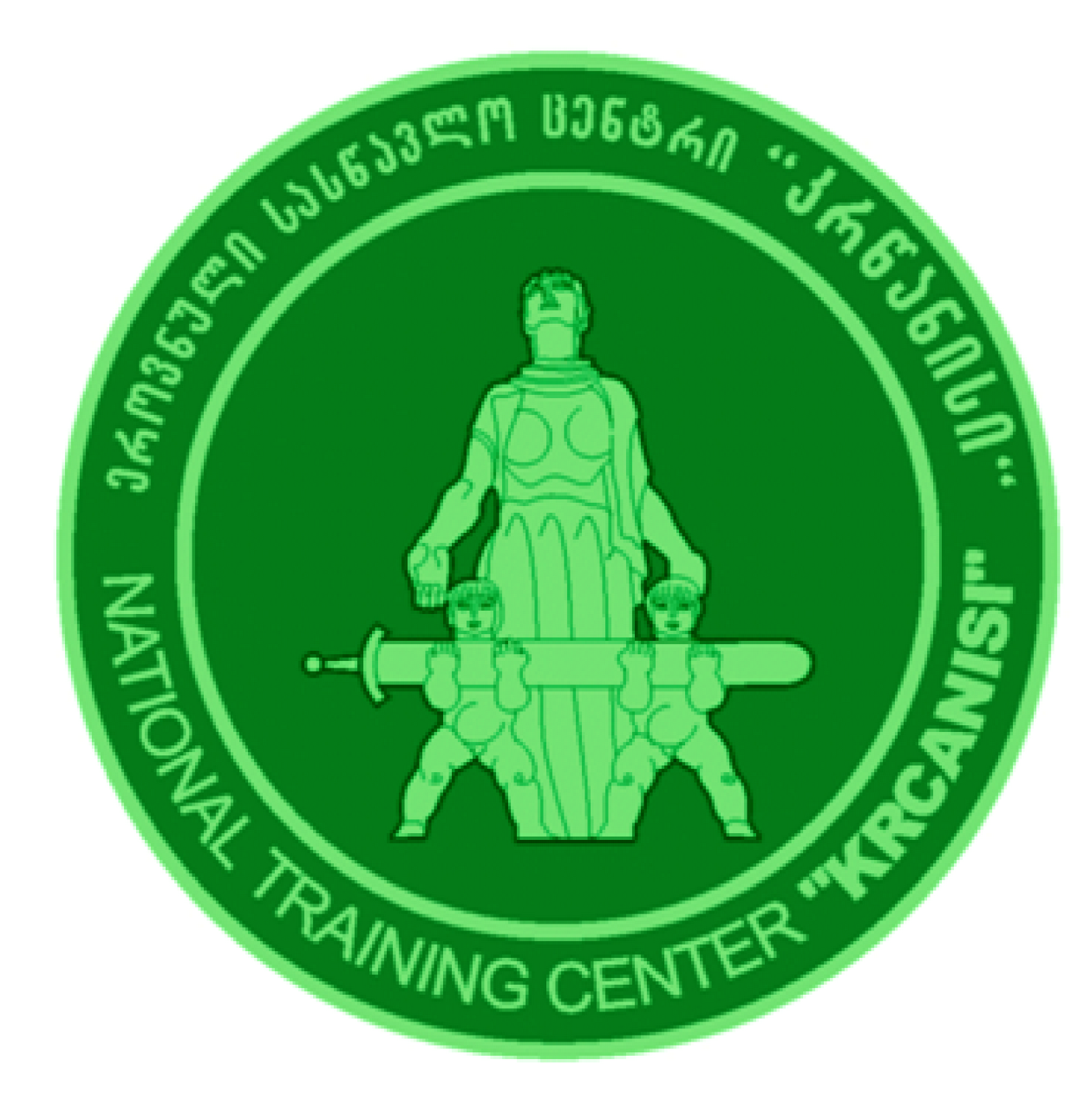
- Logo

Location
- Coordinates: 41.5824°N 44.9129°E

The Training and Military Education Support Centre "Krtsanisi" (Georgian: წვრთნებისა და სამხედრო განათლების მხარდამჭერი ცენტრი „კრწანისი“) is a major training facility for the military of Georgia and its US Marine Corps partners, located at the Krtsanisi settlement, outside Georgia’s capital city of Tbilisi, at the foothills of the Iaghluja mountainous range. It is operated by the Georgian Defense Forces General Staff Military Training and Education Command. Established in April 1997, the unit was known as the Krtsanisi National Training Center (ეროვნული სასწავლო ცენტრი „კრწანისი“) until 2016. It was also referred to as the Krtsanisi Training Area (KTA), especially in the United States sources.

== History ==
The training centre Krtsanisi was formed on the basis of the former Iaghluja shooting range on April 22, 1997. Since 2002, the centre has been a principal ground for the U.S.-sponsored training programs for the Georgian military (GTEP, GSSOP, GDP–ISAF). From 2002 to 2007, $6.5 million of GSSOP funds were used to build barracks, classrooms, a dining hall, and other infrastructure at the Krtsanisi centre. In 2010, the centre was equipped with the Multiple Integrated Laser Engagement System (MILES).

On January 11, 2011, an explosion of a 120 mm mortar shell during artillery drills killed three and injured thirteen soldiers at the Krtsanisi centre.

Since August 2015, the facility also hosts the NATO–Georgia Joint Training and Evaluation Center (JTEC).

== Structure and courses ==
The Centre maintains seven principal training courses:

- Basic Combat Training Course
- Infantry Specialization Course
- Anti-aircraft Gunner Training Course
- Artillery Training Course
- Combat Operations Supporters Training Course
- Snipers Training Course
- Sergeants Preparation Course

Major Malkhaz Merlani (b. 1976) has been the chief of the centre since 2010.
