= Vakhtang Kapanadze =

Georgian major general (born 1960)

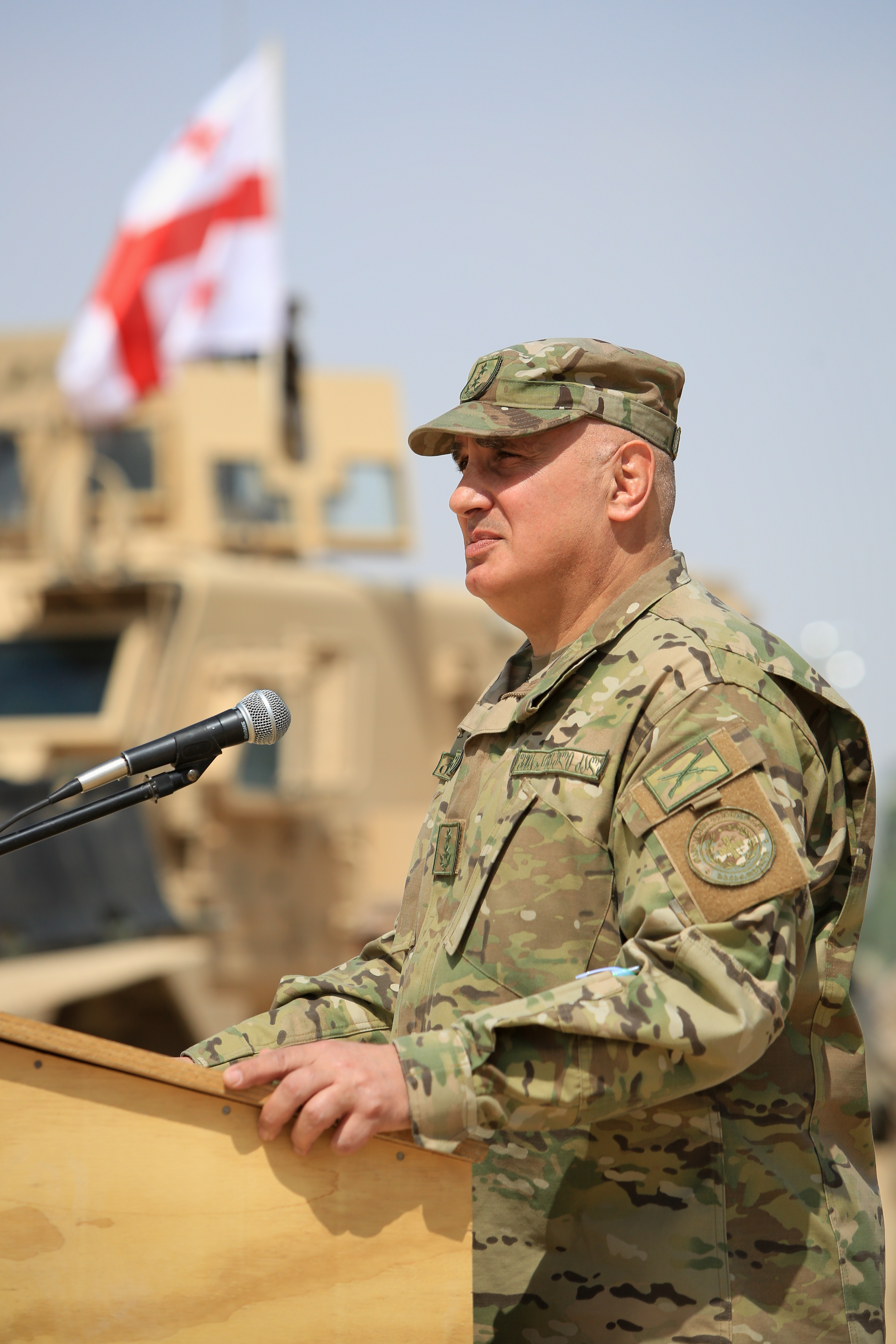
- Vakhtang Kapanadze, 2014
- Born: 17 August 1960 (age 66); Tbilisi, Soviet Union (now Georgia)
- Military career
- Allegiance: Georgia
- Branch: Georgian Armed Forces; Land Forces
- Service years: 1990–present
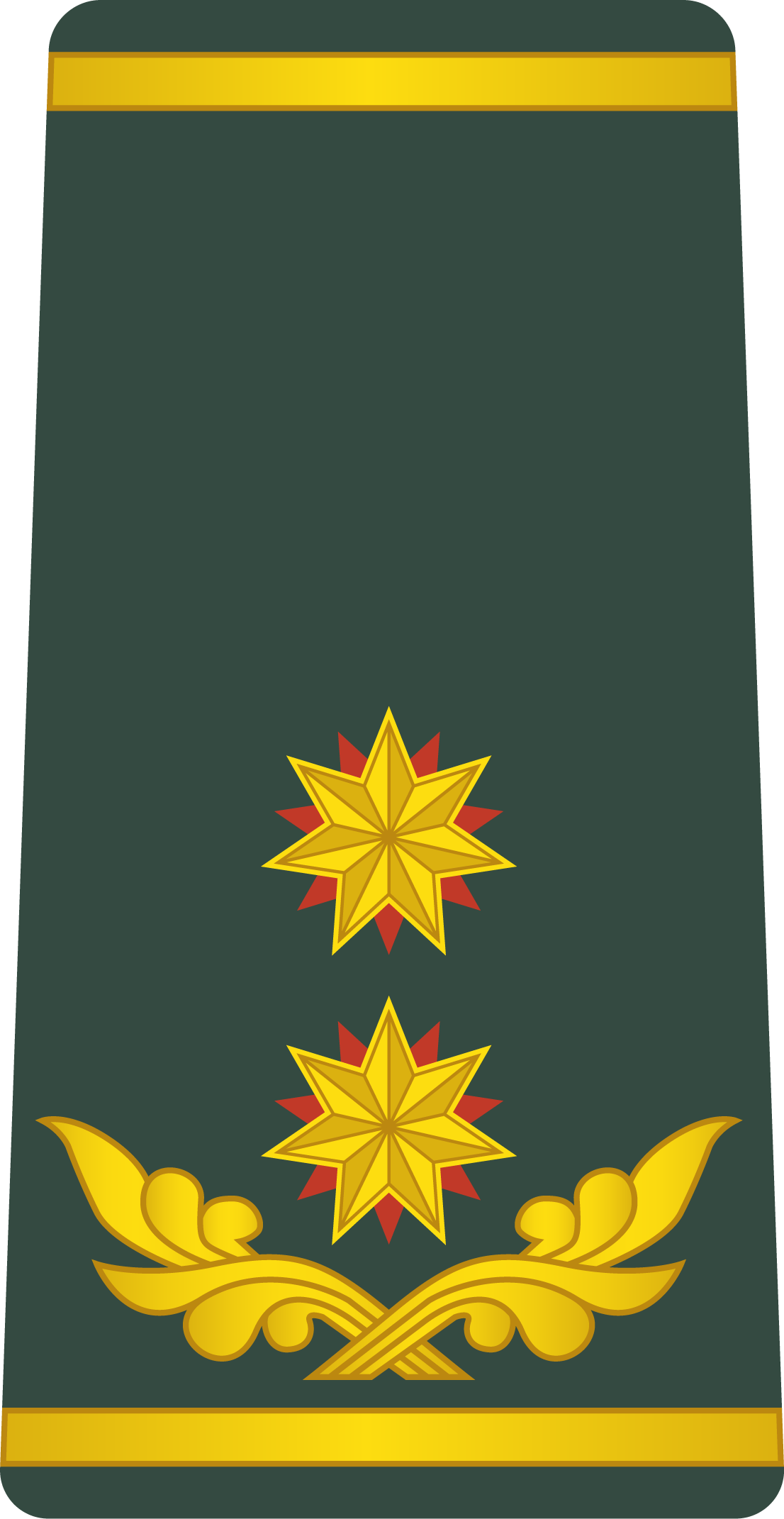
- Rank
- Commands: Georgian Armed Forces: 2003–2004, Georgian Peacekeeping Battalion in South Ossetia; 2004–2005, Chief of General Staff; 2008–2012, Deputy Chief of Counter Intelligence; 2013–2016, Chief of General Staff
- Conflicts: Abkhazian War; Iraq War; Afghanistan War; Russo-Georgian war

Vakhtang Kapanadze (Georgian: ვახტანგ კაპანაძე; born 17 August 1960) is a Georgian major general who was Chief of General Staff of the Georgian Armed Forces from 22 November 2013 to 22 November 2016. He held the same command from August 2004 to February 2005. Prior he was in charge of the Georgian peacekeeping battalion deployed in South Ossetia before the war broke out.

== Career ==
Kapanadze graduated from the Faculty of Geography and Geology, Tbilisi State University, in 1983. He then studied at Georgia's Academy of Interior and has also been trained at the George C. Marshall European Center for Security Studies, National Academy of the Armed Forces of Ukraine, and U.S. Army War College. A veteran of the civil wars of the early 1990s, Kapanadze commanded a Georgian peacekeeping battalion in South Ossetia in 2004 and served as the Chief of the General Staff from August 2004 to February 2005. In 2005, he briefly served as a military aide to the President of Georgia, and was then employed as a special envoy at the Ministry of Foreign Affairs of Georgia in Poland from 2007 to 2008. He was deputy head of the foreign intelligence service of Georgia from 2008 until October 2012, when Brigadier General Kapanadze was appointed Deputy Chief of Joint Staff of the Georgian Armed Forces. He again became Chief of General Staff, succeeding Colonel Irakli Dzneladze, on 22 November 2013. On this occasion, he was promoted to major general. His term expired on 22 November 2016 and was succeeded by Brigadier General Vladimer Chachibaia. He was appointed as Georgia's top military representative to NATO. Kapanadze is the recipient of the orders of Honor and Vakhtang Gorgasali, 3rd Rank.

Military offices
Preceded by Givi Iukuridze	Chief of General Staff of the Georgian Armed Forces; 2004 – 2005	Succeeded by Levan Nikoleishvili
Preceded by Irakli Dzneladze	Chief of General Staff of the Georgian Armed Forces; 2013 – 2016	Succeeded by Vladimer Chachibaia
