= Irakli Dzneladze =

Georgian brigadier general

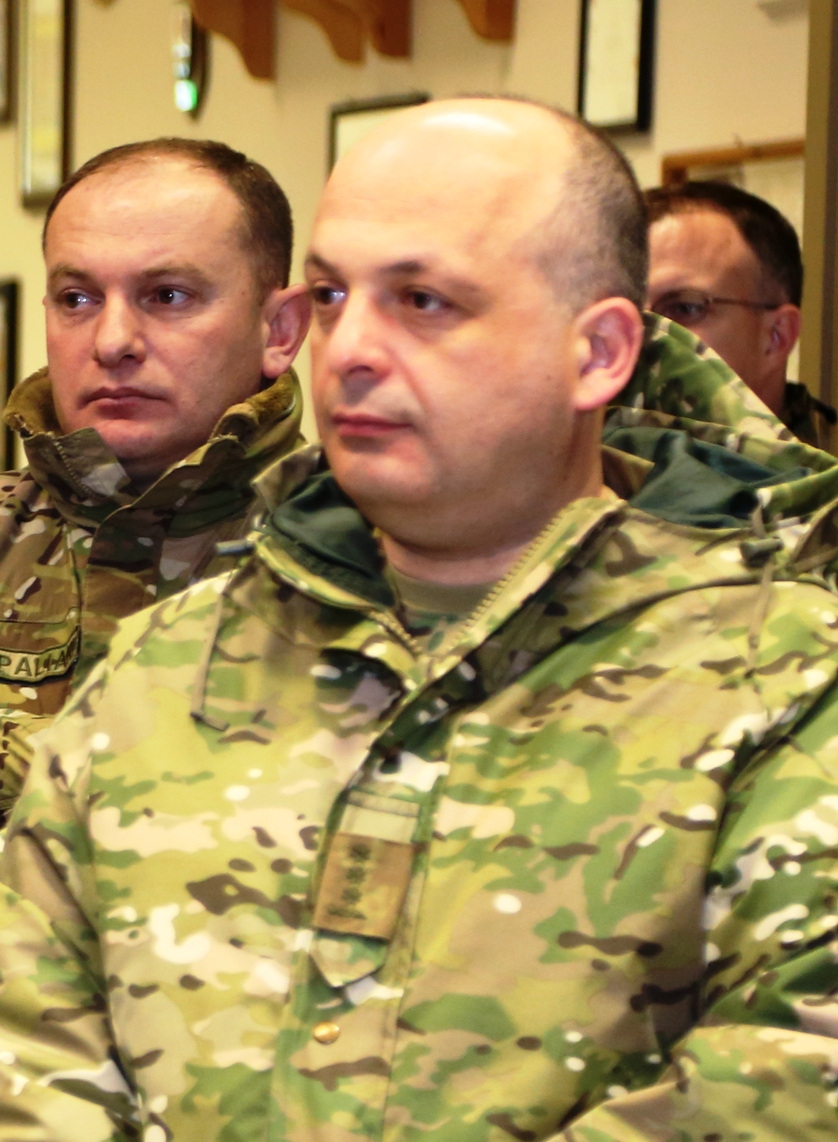
- Col. Dzneladze at JMRC, Hohenfels in February 2013
- Born: May 10, 1968 (age 58)
- Military career
- Allegiance: Georgia
- Branch: Georgian Army
- Rank: Brigadier General
- Commands: Georgian Armed Forces

Irakli Dzneladze (Georgian: ირაკლი ძნელაძე) (born May 10, 1968) is a Georgian Brigadier General (2019) and the Chief of Joint Staff of the Georgian Armed Forces from December 4, 2012, to November 22, 2013.

== Education ==
Dzneladze graduated from the Georgian Technical University with a degree in Machine Building Industry in 1992 and from the Joint Military Academy of Defense Ministry of Georgia in 1999. He received further military training in Germany in 1998 and 2000 and in the United States in 2009.

== Career ==
Dzneladze has been employed at various departments of the Ministry of Defense of Georgia since 1993. He has also worked at the J-3 Operative Planning Department and Land Forces Command for various periods of time. Dzneladze was appointed Chief of J-2 Intelligence Department of the Joint Staff in November 2011 and moved to the position of military attaché to Ukraine, Moldova, and Belarus in May 2012.

== Chief of Joint Staff ==
Dzneladze was appointed as the Chief of Joint Staff of the Georgian Armed Forces on December 4, 2012. His appointment was the result of agreement between President of Georgia Mikheil Saakashvili and Minister of Defense Irakli Alasania, who then represented opposing political parties since the defeat of Saakashvili's United National Movement in favor of Bidzina Ivanishvili's Georgian Dream coalition, of which Alasania was a member, in the 2012 parliamentary election. The appointment was preceded by a controversy over Dzneladze's predecessor Brigadier General Giorgi Kalandadze, who was briefly arrested and subsequently stripped of his office by the court in November 2012. He was succeeded as Chief of General Staff by General Vakhtang Kapanadze on November 22, 2013.

== Later postings ==
Dzneladze served as Georgia's military representative to the NATO headquarters in Brussels from 2014 to 2017. In 2017, he was appointed chief of the J-3 Operational Department, the General Staff.

== Awards ==
- State Medal for Military Service (2000)
- Special Medal of Ministry of Defense, 2nd rank (2008)
- Special Medal of Ministry of Defense, 1st rank (2009)
- General Kvinitadze Medal, Ministry of Defense (2011)
- Kakusta Cholokashvili Medal, Ministry of Defense (2012)
- Vakhtang Gorgasali Order, 2nd rank (2013).

Military offices
| Preceded by Giorgi Kalandadze | Chief of Joint Staff of the Georgian Armed Forces; 2012 – 2013 | Succeeded by Vakhtang Kapanadze |
