= Giorgi Dzneladze =

Georgian footballer

Personal information
- Date of birth: 30 August 1968 (age 58)
- Place of birth: Tsulukidze, now Khoni, Georgian SSR
- Height: 1.81 m (5 ft 11 in)
- Position: Defender

Senior career*
Years	Team	Apps	(Gls)
1986	FC Dinamo Tbilisi	0	(0)
1986	FC Lokomotivi Tbilisi	5	(0)
1987	FC Guria Lanchkhuti (reserves)		
1988–1989	FC Shevardeni Tbilisi	41	(5)
1989	PFC Chayka-CSKA Moscow	22	(0)
1990	FC Shevardeni-1906 Tbilisi	31	(0)
1991–1992	FC Alazani Gurjaani	26	(2)
1992–1993	FC Krylia Sovetov Samara	10	(0)
1993–1994	FC Sokol Saratov	42	(0)
1995	Kodako Tbilisi	16	(3)
1996–1997	FC Salyut Saratov	41	(5)
1997	Abahani Limited		
1997	Shiraki Dedoplistskaro	6	(1)
1998	FC Torpedo-Viktoriya Nizhny Novgorod	3	(0)
1999	FC Sioni Bolnisi	7	(1)
1999	Aragvi Dusheti	8	(0)
2000	FC Margveti Zestaponi	7	(3)
2000–2001	FC Guria-Lokomotivi-2 Lanchkhuti	19	(1)
- * Club domestic league appearances and goals

Giorgi Dzneladze (born 30 August 1968 in Tsulukidze, now Khoni) is a retired Georgian professional football player.

Dzneladze played in the Russian Premier League with FC Krylia Sovetov Samara.
