= Georgian involvement in the Iraq War =

- Part of the Iraq War
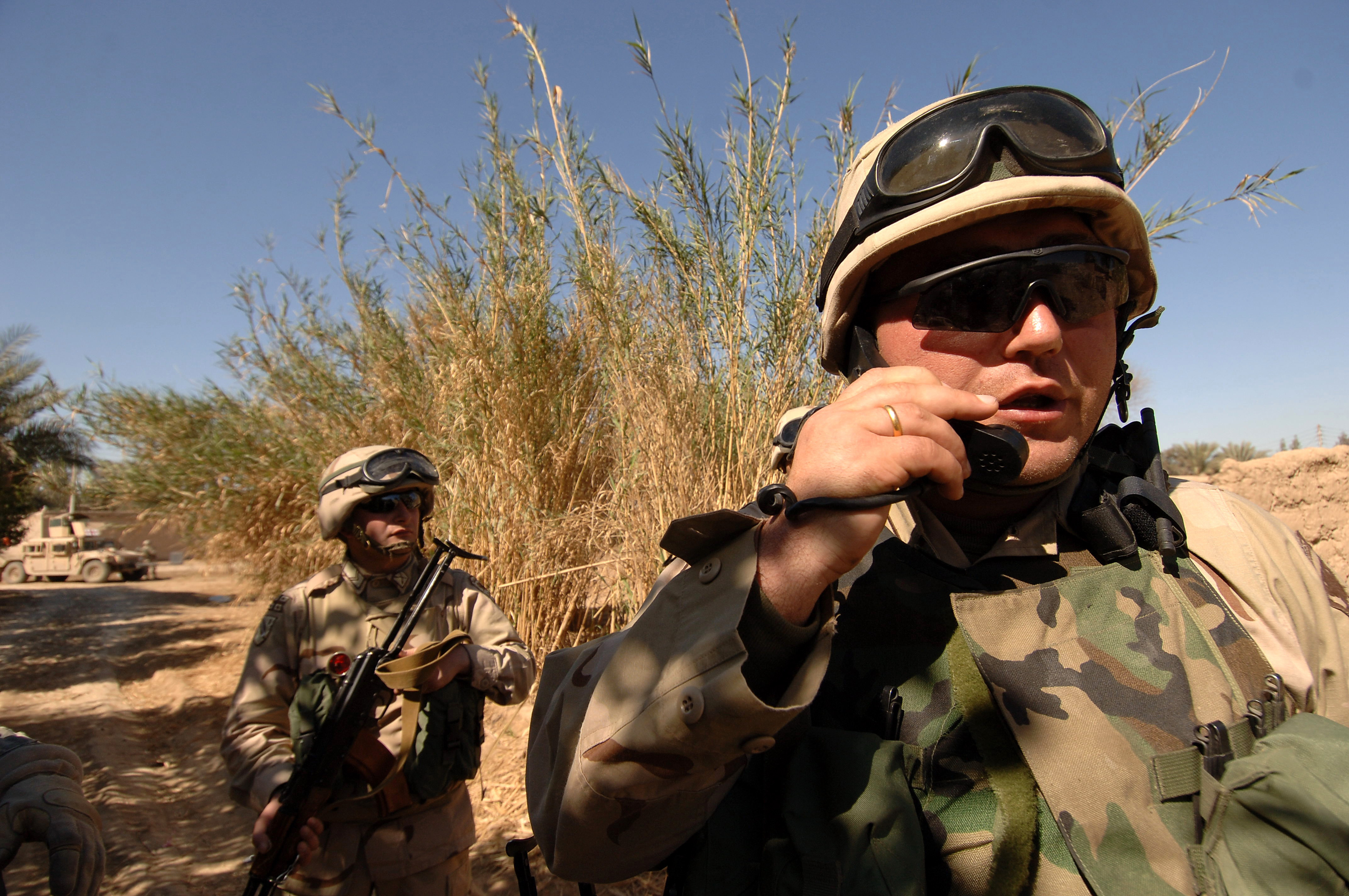
- Georgian soldiers from the 13th Light Infantry Battalion on a clearing mission in Al Shaheen, Iraq, in March 2007.
Date	11 August 2003 – 11 August 2008
Location	Multinational Division Central-South, Iraq
Result	Georgian withdrawal; see Iraq War for full results

Belligerents
(Georgia (country)) Georgia	Ba'ath loyalists; Mahdi Army

Commanders and leaders
(Georgia (country)) Eduard Shevardnadze; (Georgia (country)) Mikheil Saakashvili	Izzat Ibrahim al-Douri; Muqtada al-Sadr; Abu Deraa

Strength
70 (2003) 300(2004) 850 (2005) 2,300 (2008)	Unknown

Casualties and losses
5 killed (2 non-combat deaths) 19+ wounded	unknown

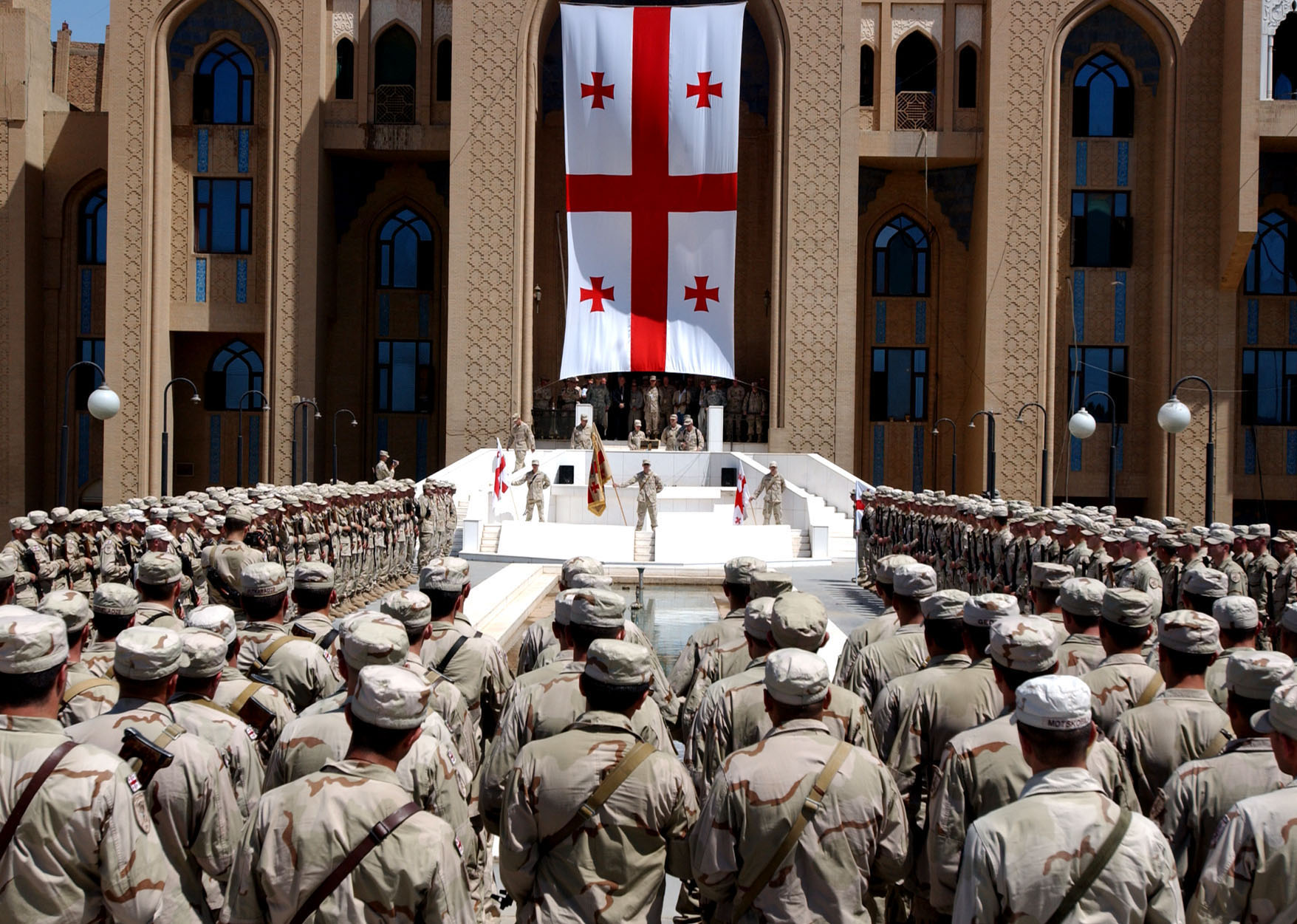
Georgian soldiers from the 22nd Light Infantry Battalion, 2nd Infantry Brigade, celebrating the Independence Day of Georgia on May 26, 2006, in Baghdad, Iraq.

Georgia joined the Iraq war as part of the United States-led coalition in August 2003. By 2008, Georgia had deployed 2,300 troops in Iraq, becoming the third largest contributor to the coalition forces in the Iraq War. In addition, the country provided a battalion of approximately 550 troops to the United Nations Assistance Mission in Iraq. All Georgian troops were withdrawn from Iraq amid the Russia–Georgia war in August 2008. Georgia suffered five fatal casualties in Iraq.

== Deployment history ==
Georgia strongly supported the U.S.-led entrance of troops in Iraq for peacekeeping purposes and deployed troops to the country in August 2003. Georgia's military deployment was undertaken as part of broader efforts to bolster closer ties with the United States and NATO in the face of the continuing Russian threat. The United States provided military training programs—GTEP and GSSOP—for Georgian forces. There was no tangible domestic opposition to the Georgian involvement in Iraq.

Georgia's initial deployment was a platoon of special forces and a medical team, a total of 70 personnel in 2003. The Georgian presence in Iraq increased to 300 personnel in 2004 and to 850 in 2005, and peaked at 2,300 soldiers in mid-2008. The largest contingents deployed were the 3rd Infantry Brigade (July 2007 – January 2008) and the 1st Infantry Brigade (January–August 2008). In addition to participation in Operation Iraqi Freedom, from 2005 to 2008 Georgia also contributed a battalion of approximately 550 troops to the United Nations Assistance Mission in Iraq, which was stationed in Baghdad within the "Green Zone".

At first, the Georgian troops deployed for Operation Iraqi Freedom were stationed in Baghdad and provided general security measures. Beginning in 2007, the Georgians were deployed along the border with Iran, with their main base at Kut, and tasked to interdict smuggled weapons, goods, and drugs. The Georgian units worked primarily within the U.S. area of operations. In total, more than 6,000 Georgian soldiers served in Iraq on the basis of six-month rotations; the service in Iraq was voluntary.

During the Russia–Georgia war in August 2008, Georgia recalled all of its forces from Iraq. The U.S. Air Force provided logistical support for the withdrawal. On August 10–11, 2008, 16 C-17 Globemasters shuttled around 2,000 Georgian soldiers and supplies back to Georgia, drawing a sharp protest from Russia.

== Programs ==
=== Train and Equip ===
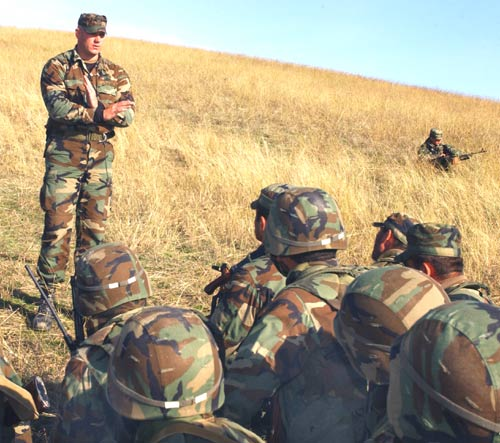
10th Special Forces Group soldier instructing Georgian troops on the dangers of conducting live-fire ambushes and maintaining muzzle control.

The Georgia Train and Equip Program (GTEP) was an American-sponsored 18-month, $64-million program aimed at increasing the capabilities of the Georgian armed forces by training and equipping four 600-man battalions with light weapons, vehicles and communications. The program enabled the US to expedite funding for the Georgian military for Operation Enduring Freedom.

On 27 February 2002, the US media reported that the U.S. would send approximately two hundred United States Army Special Forces soldiers to Georgia to train Georgian troops. The program implemented President Bush's decision to respond to the Government of Georgia's request for assistance to enhance its counter-terrorism capabilities and addressed the situation in the Pankisi Gorge. The program was planned to be a 20-month long, $64 million effort.

The move drew protests from many Russians. On 1 March 2002, in response to the domestic outcry, Russian president Vladimir Putin met with Georgian president Eduard Shevardnadze in Kazakhstan and pledged his support for the American military initiative.

The program began in May 2002 when American special forces soldiers of the 10th Special Forces Group began training select units of the Georgian Armed Forces, including the 12th Commando Light Infantry Battalion, the 16th Mountain-Infantry Battalion, the 13th "Shavnabada" Light Infantry Battalion, the 11th Light Infantry Battalion, a mechanized company, and small numbers of Interior Ministry troops and border guards. The goal of the program was to boost the proficiency of Georgia's security forces in areas including border security, anti-terrorism, disaster response.

Responsibility for training Georgian forces was eventually handed off to the U.S. Marine Corps in conjunction with the British Army. British and American teams worked as part of a joint effort to train each of the four infantry battalion staffs and their organic rifle companies. This training began with the individual soldier and continued through fire team, squad, platoon, company, and battalion level tactics as well as staff planning and organization. Upon completing training, each of the new Georgian infantry battalions began preparing for deployment rotations in support of the Global War on Terrorism. As part of the program Georgian troops were issued new uniforms, boots, weapons, and other articles of equipment.

Although GTEP formally ended in April 2004, US military assistance to Georgia continued through the Georgia Sustainment and Stability Operations Program. Part of this program involved preparing Georgian units for operations in US-led Multinational Force Iraq. That program ended in September 2007.

=== Sustainment and Stability Operations ===
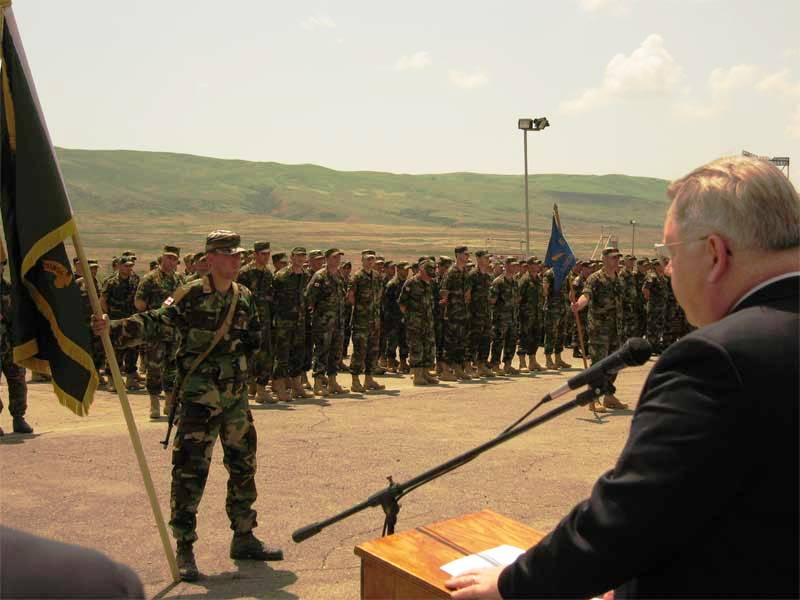
The then-U.S. Ambassador to Georgia John F. Tefft addresses the Georgian graduates of the GSSOP II Program. June 17, 2007.

The Georgia Sustainment and Stability Operations Program (GSSOP) was a security assistance program designed to create an increased capability in the Georgian military to support Operation Iraqi Freedom stability missions. Launched in January 2005, GSSOP was also designed to help solidify the progress made during the Georgia Train and Equip Program (GTEP) of 2002–2004 and continue to assist in the implementation of western standards in the Georgian armed forces.

The first phase of the program (GSSOP-I) lasted about 18 months and cost approximately $60 million. It ended in October 2006 to be succeeded by GSSOP-II, which lasted until June 2007. The training was conducted, primarily at the Krtsanisi National Training Centre near Tbilisi, by the United States Army Special Forces and United States Marine Corps Forces, Europe. The beneficiaries were the 22nd, 23rd, 31st, 32nd and 33rd Light Infantry Battalions, logistic battalions of the 1st, 2nd, and 3rd Infantry Brigades, the reconnaissance companies of the 2nd and 3rd Infantry Brigades, communication companies of the 2nd and 3rd Brigades, and an independent military police company.

On August 31, 2009, the U.S. and Georgia inaugurated the Georgia Deployment Program—International Security Assistance Force (GDP—ISAF) In order to prepare the Georgian units for deployment in Afghanistan as part of the International Security Assistance Force. Originally planned as a two-year engagement, the success of past missions has extended the pairing as the Georgia Deployment Program—Resolute Support Mission (GDP—RSM) into 2020.

== Casualties ==
In total, Georgia suffered three combat fatalities (all in 2008) and at least 19 servicemen were injured in Iraq. In addition, one Georgian serviceman died in a car accident and one committed suicide, both in 2007.

== See also ==
- Role of Georgia in the War in Afghanistan (2001–2021)
- Georgian Kosovo contingent
