= Defence Forces of Georgia =

Combined military forces of Georgia

- საქართველოს თავდაცვის ძალები
- Flag of the Georgian Defence Forces

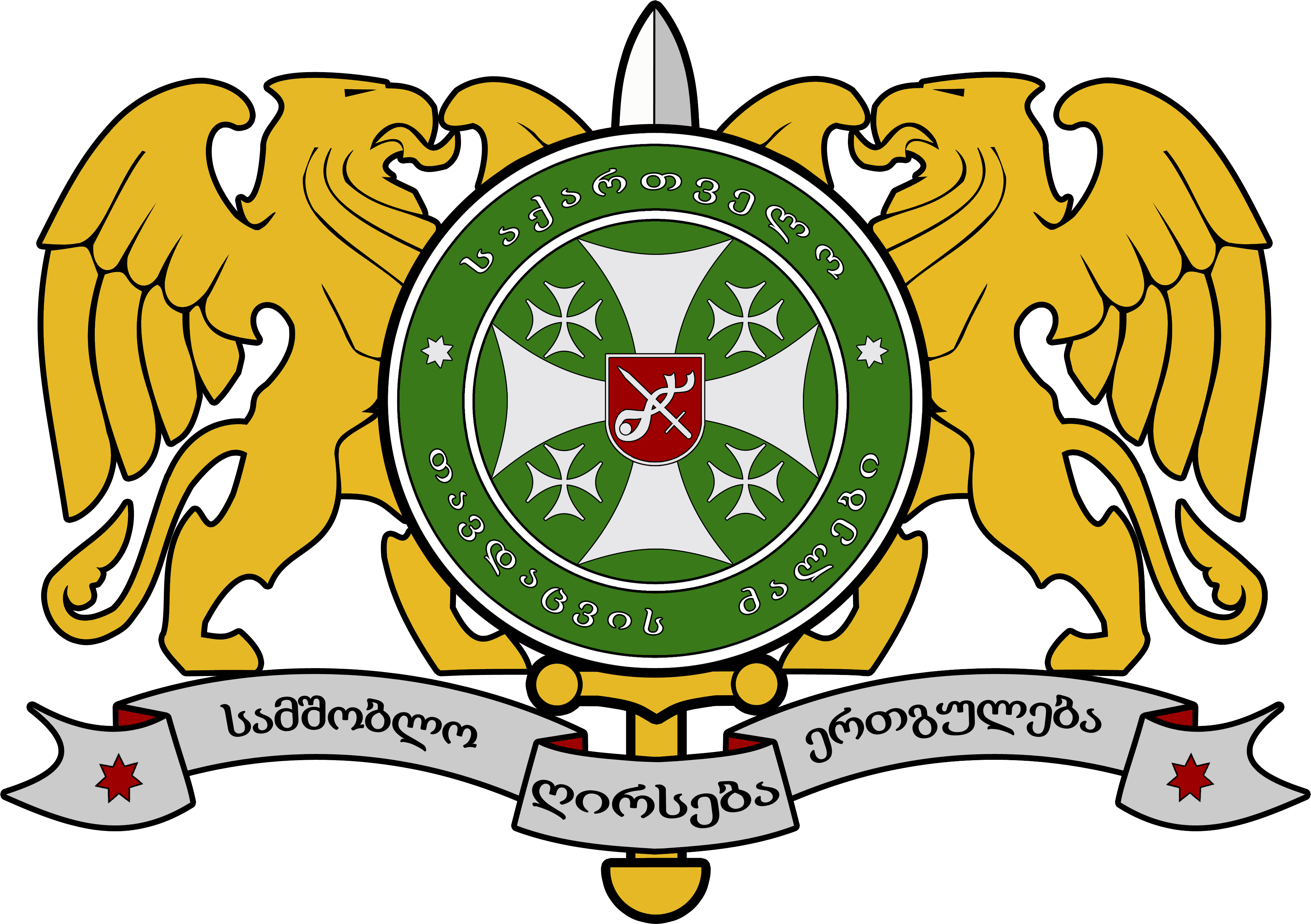
- Coat of arms of the Georgian Defence Forces
- Founded: September 1918
- Current form: December 2018
- Service branches: Land Forces; Air Force; National Guard
- Headquarters: Tbilisi, Georgia
- Website: mod.gov.ge

Leadership
- Commander-in-chief: President Mikheil Kavelashvili
- Prime Minister: Irakli Kobakhidze
- Minister of Defence: Irakli Chikovani
- Chief of Defence Forces: Lt. Gen. Giorgi Matiashvili

Personnel
- Military age: 18–65 years old
- Conscription: 18 years of age, 12 months
- Active personnel: 37,000
- Reserve personnel: 27,000 (Active as of 2023); 23,000 (Specialist as of 2023); 155,500 (territorial reserve as of 2024)
- Deployed personnel: Currently nowhere

Expenditure
- Budget: ₾1.89 billion GEL US$702.8 million (2026)
- Percent of GDP: 1.66% (2026)

Industry
- Domestic suppliers: Tbilisi Aircraft Manufacturing; TAM Management; Scientific Technical Center Delta; Tbilisi Tank Factory; Delta CAA Tactical; Delta WB
- Foreign suppliers: Austria; Bulgaria; Czech Republic; France; Germany; Israel; Italy; Japan; Poland; Portugal; Romania; Slovakia; Spain; Sweden; Switzerland; Turkey; United States; Ukraine Former: Russia; Belarus

Related articles
- History: Military history of Georgia; List of wars involving Georgia
- Ranks: Georgian military ranks

The Defence Forces of Georgia (Georgian: საქართველოს თავდაცვის ძალები, romanized: sakartvelos tavdatsvis dzalebi), or Georgian Defence Forces (GDF), are the combined military forces of Georgia, tasked with the defence of the nation's independence, sovereignty, and territorial integrity. They consist of the Land Force, Air Force, National Guard, and Special Operations Forces. The Defence Forces are under overall leadership of the Minister of Defence of Georgia and directly headed by the Chief of Defence Forces.

The first regular military was established in the first Georgian Republic in 1918 and was in existence until after the republic's overthrow by the invading Soviet Russian forces in 1921. The modern Georgian military were founded in accordance with the government decree of 24 April 1991. 30 April, the day when the first conscripts were called up for military service in 1991, has been celebrated as the day of the Georgian military forces.

The Georgian military have fought in the civil war and separatist conflicts in the 1990s and the Russo-Georgian War of 2008 as well as major international military missions such as in Iraq and Afghanistan. Georgia was one of the first former Soviet republics to join the NATO Partnership for Peace program in 1994 and Individual Partnership Action Plan (IPAP) in 2004 and has sought to bring its military in line with the NATO standards.

== History of the Defence Forces ==
=== Establishment and early years ===
On 20 December 1990, President Zviad Gamsakhurdia ordered the creation of what is now the Defence Forces. In January 1991, Soviet President Mikhail Gorbachev and Supreme Soviet Chairman Anatoly Lukyanov, demanded that Gamsakhurdia to stop the creation of the National Guard. The National Guard's first military parade was held at Boris Paichadze Stadium on 30 April 1991, where, for the first time in 70 years, Georgians swore allegiance to the Georgian people. This day is today commemorated as Defence Forces Day.

The new military was mainly manned by volunteers and ethnically Georgian officers serving in the Soviet Armed Forces at the time. The transfer of former Transcaucasian Military District facilities, weapons, and formations located in Georgia began in early 1992 and lasted until 1997. On 30 April 1992, the heads of the defence ministries of the Russian Federation and Georgia signed an agreement on the transfer of military units and facilities. According to it, Georgia received the following formations:

- 10th Armoured Division (without 403rd Motorized Rifle Regiment) – Akhaltsikhe (actually refers to the 10th Guards Motor Rifle Division)
- 6th Fortified Area – Akhaltsikhe
- 8th Fortified Area

During the Georgian Civil War, units waged war against supporters of the ousted Gamsakhurdia. The Georgian Armed Forces also took part in the 1991–1992 South Ossetia War and the War in Abkhazia (1992–1993), losing both, after which Georgia lost control over most of the territory of these republics.

=== 21st century ===
The Georgia Train and Equip Program (GTEP) training was conducted using U.S. Special Operations Forces and U.S. Marine Corps forces from May 2002 to May 2004. During this time, approximately 2,600 Georgian soldiers, including a headquarters staff element and 5 tactical units, received training. Another assistance program, the Georgia Security and Stability Operations Program (Georgia SSOP), was launched in January 2005 as a continuation of the (GTEP) of 2002–2004. Georgian contingents were involved in the Kosovo Force and continue to participate in the operations in Iraq and Afghanistan.

The DFG has been extensively reformed in recent years to meet Georgia's aspirations to join NATO and to better respond to existing challenges such as ongoing tensions in the unresolved separatist conflict areas in Abkhazia and South Ossetia, as well as threats of global terrorism. Georgia also views a large-scale foreign invasion and the spillover of conflicts from Russia's North Caucasus as the worst potential near- and long-term scenarios, respectively.

On 8 August 2008, the Georgian military conducted an operation in Georgia's breakaway region South Ossetia (see 2008 South Ossetia War) in response to separatist attacks. The operation led to an armed conflict with forces from the Russian Federation and resulted in the defeat and expulsion of Georgian forces from South Ossetia and Abkhazia. After the military operations, Russia recognised the regions' independence.

Georgia's military budget increased from $411.83 million in 1991 to $1.07 billion in 2008. As of 2013, the budget was $398.92 million.

=== Russo-Georgian War ===
In August 2008, following a series of fierce clashes in South Ossetia, Georgia attempted to retake the separatist territory by force. In the resulting military conflict with Russia, Georgia was driven out of South Ossetia and Abkhazia, and lost parts of its military capabilities. Russian forces sank four Georgian naval vessels in the port of Poti and hauled away nine rigid-hull inflatable boats. Georgia Land Forces lost approximately 30 T-72's, 6 BMP's, 2 BTRs, and around 10 artillery pieces of all types in combat. The Russians also captured 5 intact BMP's, approximately 5 artillery pieces, a BUK SAM system and an OSA SAM system. The Georgian Air Force lost three AN-2's, 2 Mi-24's and 1 Mi-14 on the ground. Ministry of Internal Affairs of Georgia lost 2 Hermes 450 reconnaissance drones and 1 Otokar Cobra APC. The Russian military lost more military equipment in combat than Georgia..

=== Reconstruction ===
Georgia immediately began rearmament after the war. The conflict was immediately followed by a replenishment program to fill gaps in the GAF's single-source arms supply, along with a massive re-equipment and modernisation program. Two Georgian naval vessels sunk in Poti were raised and returned to service. The Georgian Navy's remaining operational units were merged into the Coast Guard, which received training in search-and-seizure tactics from the United States. Ukraine supplied Georgia with 30 BTR-70 armored personnel carriers, 2 BUK SAM system batteries and 6 OSA mobile SAM systems. Israel supplied Georgia with 13 Wolf APC's and SPYDER-SR SAM systems and many types of firearms. The U.S. supplied Georgia with infantry equipment, including personal protection equipment, firearms, APCs, and anti-tank missiles. Georgia has also received MANPADs and radars from France. NATO militaries also often train with the Georgian military and have annual military drills in Georgia. Georgia also rebuilt its damaged military bases and constructed more military barracks. By late 2010, the Georgian military had reached a strength greater than pre-war levels and, after completing the reforms, decisively reduced military spending. Beginning in 2010, Georgia started producing its own line of APCs, IFVs, infantry personal protection equipment, small arms, and mortars.

== Structure ==
The Defence Forces of Georgia consist of four branches: Land Forces, Air Force, National Guard, and Special Operations Forces.

The overall command is exercised by the Chief of Defence Forces, who is aided by the General Staff of the Defence Forces. The Defence Forces are further organized into several structural units:

- Eastern Command
- Western Command
- Air and Air Defence Command
- Special Operations Forces
- Military Training and Education Command
- Army Logistics Command
- National Guard
- Military Police
- Department of Military Intelligence

In wartime, several other bodies fall under the control of the Defence Forces additionally. These are:

- Border Police of Georgia, a subordinate agency of the Ministry of Internal Affairs of Georgia
- Department of Special Operations - Public Security Forces, a subunit of the Ministry of Internal Affairs of Georgia
- Department for Protection of Strategic Pipelines, a subunit of the Ministry of Internal Affairs of Georgia
- Department for Protection of Strategic Infrastructure, a subunit of the Ministry of Internal Affairs of Georgia
- National Defence Academy of Georgia, a legal entity under the Ministry of Defence
- Military Hospital of the Ministry of Defence
- Cybersecurity Bureau, a legal entity under the Ministry of Defence
- Data Exchange Agency, a legal entity under the Ministry of Justice of Georgia.

The Eastern Command and its Western counterpart are two main regional operational groupings, respectively, for eastern and western Georgia. They were created in the 2010s in order to have two autonomous territorial commands, with their own military staffs, logistical and administrative resources.

=== Branches ===
The Land Forces form the largest component of the DFG responsible for providing land defence against any threat to the nation's sovereignty and territorial integrity, supporting Border Police in border protection and civil authorities in counter-terrorist operations as well as providing units for NATO-led and coalition operations abroad. They are organized into infantry brigades, artillery and other supporting capacities operating at a battalion level.

The Special Operations Forces are responsible for conducting special reconnaissance, unconventional warfare and counter-terrorism operations. The Georgian National Guard organizes and trains reservists in the peacetime and mobilizes them during a crisis or wartime.

==== Ground arms ====
The structure of the Georgian Land Forces is based on brigade and battalion-sized military units. The main force consists of four infantry, one special operations, two artillery, one air defence brigades and several independent battalions. Georgian brigades have a total manpower of 3,000 each excluding non-combat personnel. The overall strength of the land forces in 2013 was 37,825 (excluding active reserve), from which 21 were high-ranking officers, 6,166 officers and sergeants, 28,477 corporals and privates, 125 cadets and 388 civilians. Accordingly, to reach NATO structures and higher standards the brigades were downsized to optimal as well as the 5th brigade disbanded, also to increase the percentage of spending on arms acquirement, which was previously 2%, to 6% of the military budget. The goal is to reach at least 15% until 2020. The ground forces are equipped with a variety of weapons and vehicles. Special forces operate independently under MOD direction.

The Georgian Land Force consists of following primary combat formations (incomplete):

==== Force composition ====
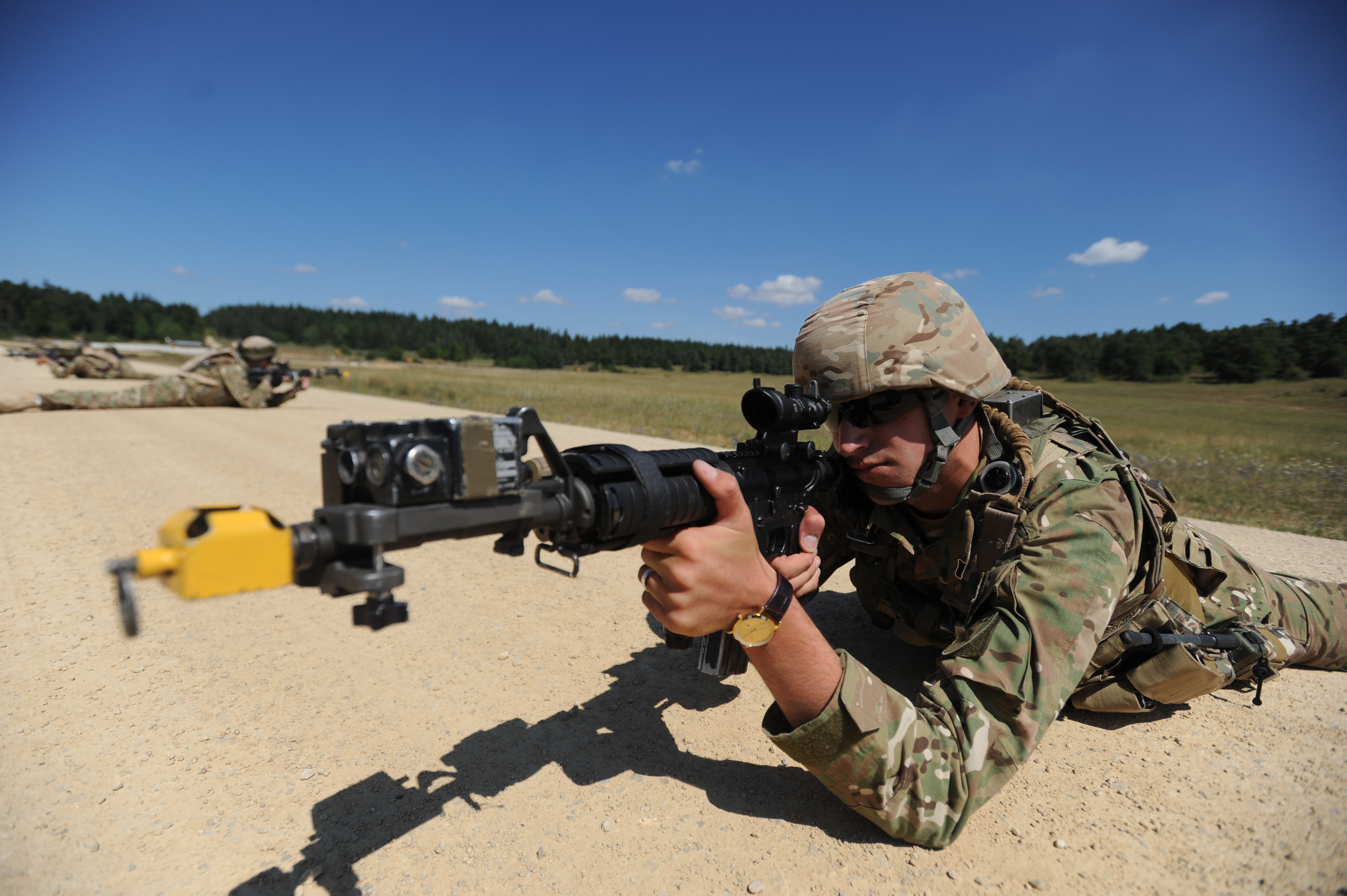
Soldiers of the 32nd Battalion conducting pre-deployment training, 2012

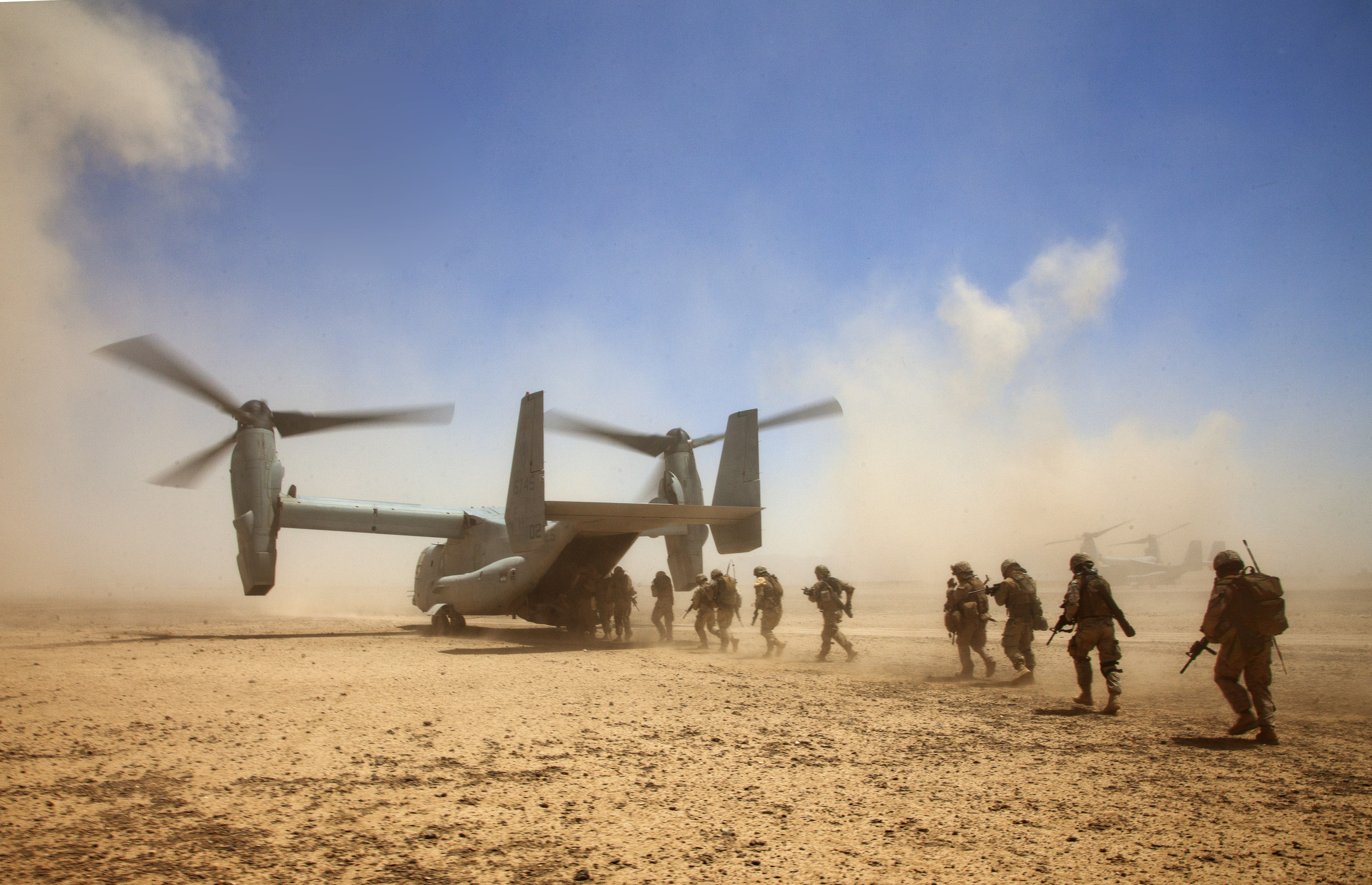
Georgian soldiers of 33rd Battalion and US Marines board a MV-22B Osprey during the Georgian lead operation Northern Lion II, 2013

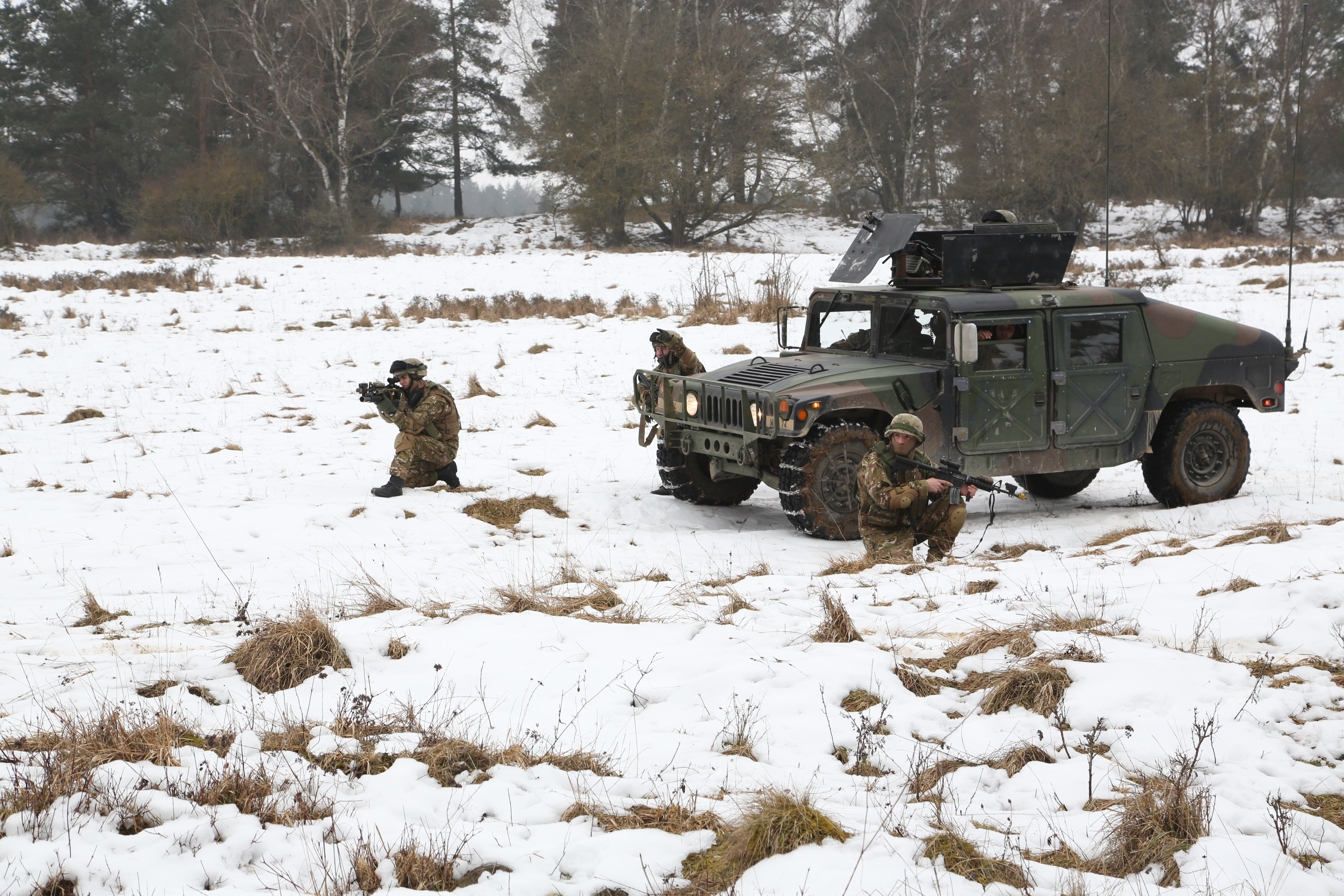
Soldiers from the 43rd Mechanized Battalion during exercises, 2015

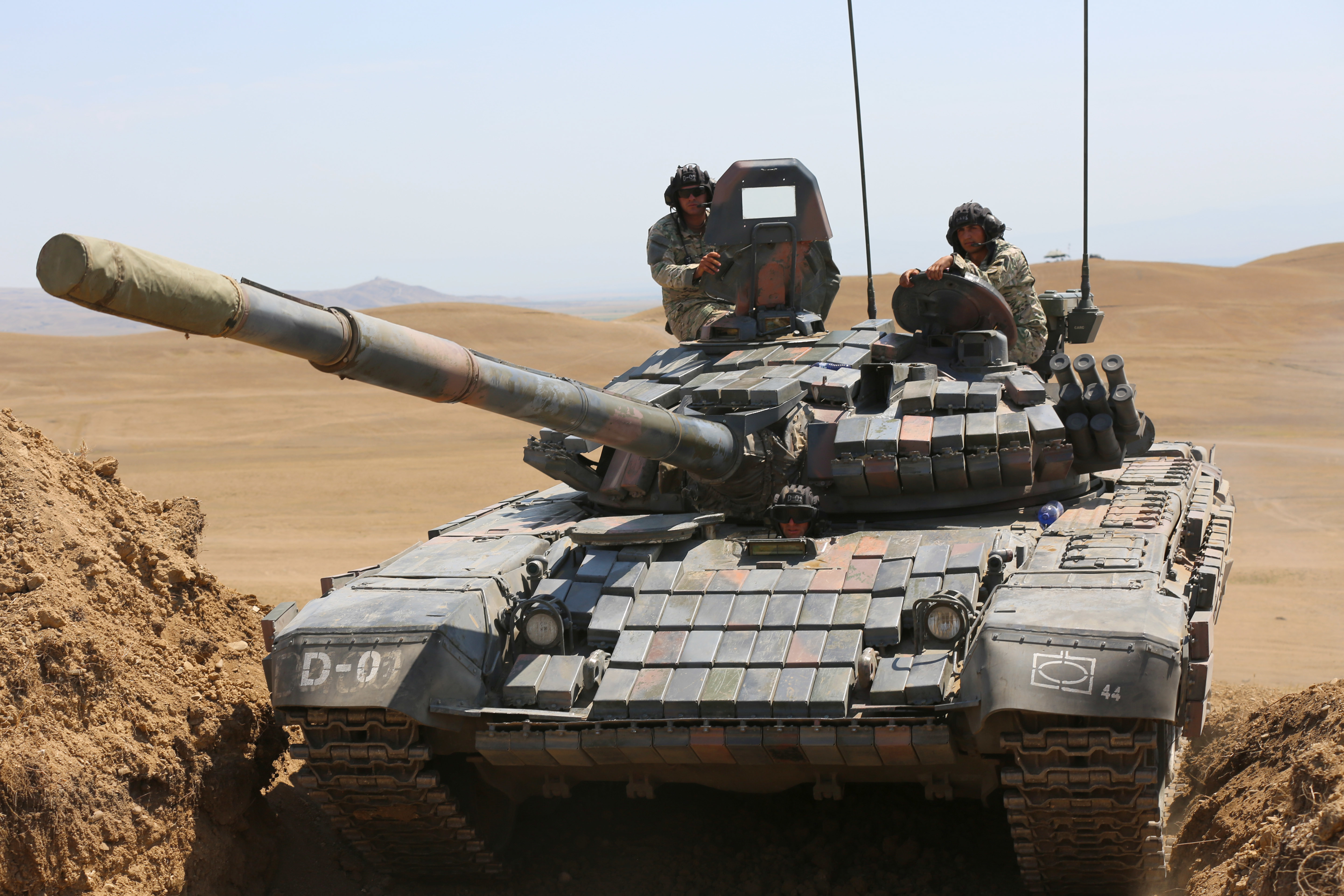
Georgian soldiers, 44th Armored Battalion, drive a T-72 tank into a fighting position during a combined training exercise, Vaziani, Republic of Georgia, Aug. 6, 2017.

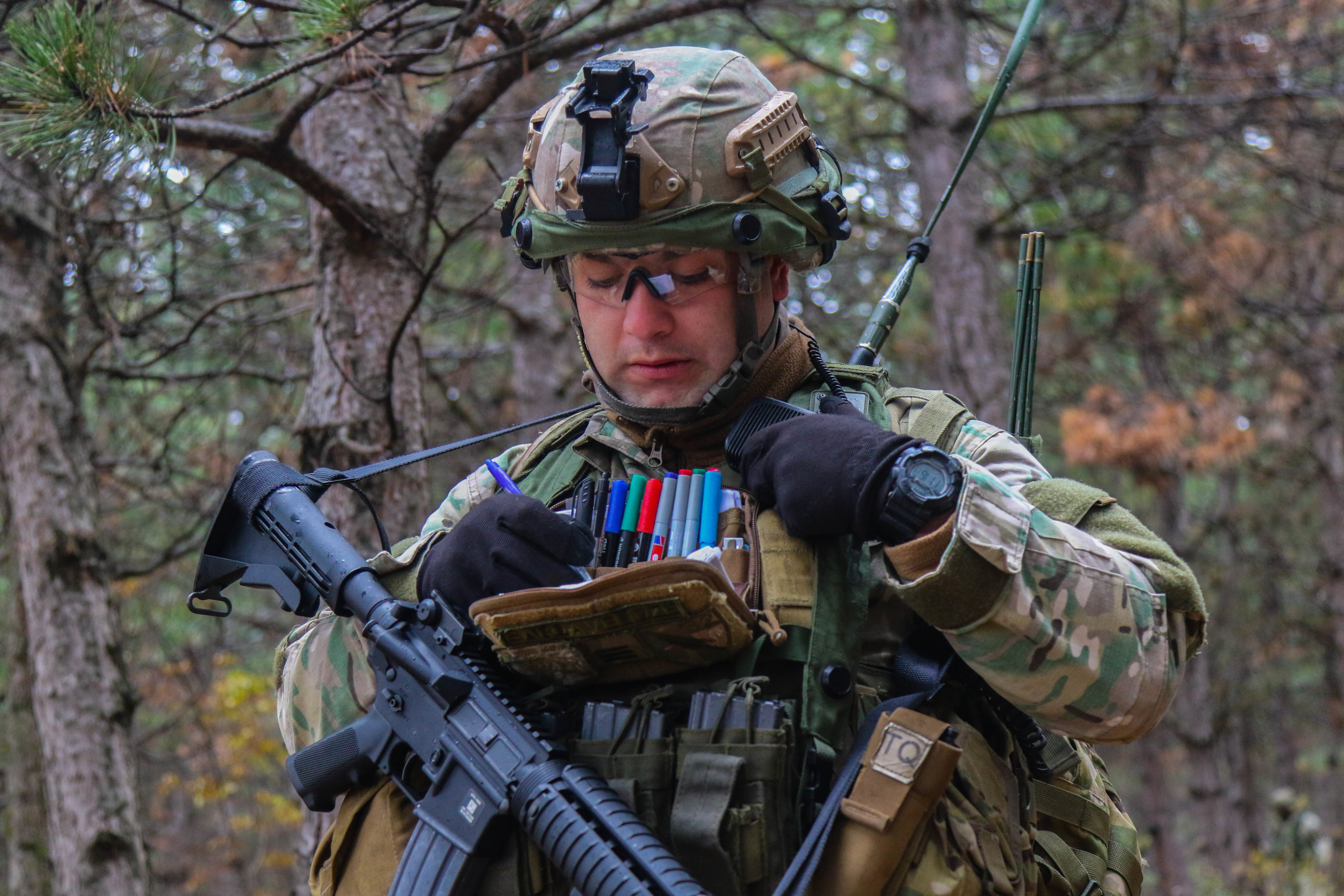
Georgian army soldier takes down grid coordinates during Defence Readiness Program-Training, 2018

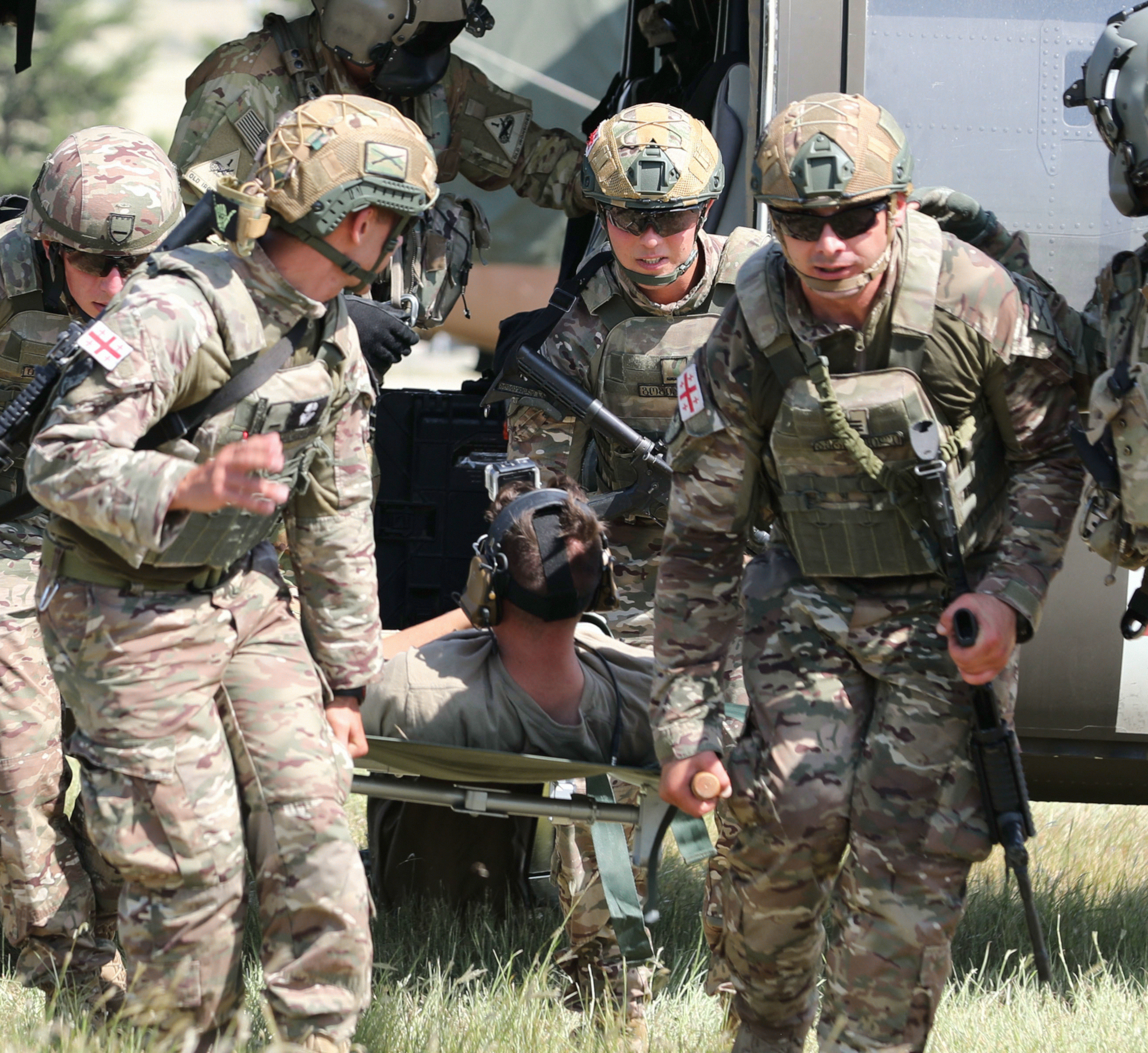
Georgian soldiers training CASEVAC during exercise Agile Spirit 2025

- HQ, Land Forces Command (Tbilisi)
  - Central Command Point
- Operational Command East
  - 1st Infantry Brigade (Tbilisi)
    - 11th Light Infantry Battalion
    - 12th Light Infantry Battalion - NRF
    - 13th Light Infantry Battalion
    - 14th Mixed Armored Battalion
    - Artillery Battalion
    - Logistics Battalion
    - Reconnaissance Company
    - Engineer Company
    - Signal Company
  - 4th Mechanized Infantry Brigade (Vaziani)
    - 41st Mechanized Infantry Battalion
    - 43rd Mechanized Infantry Battalion
    - 42nd Mixed Armored Battalion
    - 44th Artillery Battalion
    - Logistics Battalion
    - Reconnaissance Company
    - Engineer Company
    - Signal Company
  - 5th Artillery Brigade (Vaziani)
    - 51st Artillery Battalion
    - 52nd Artillery Battalion
    - 53rd Security Battalion
    - Air Defence Company
  - Special Operations Battalion
  - Ranger Battalion
  - Combat Engineer Battalion
- Operational Command West
  - 2nd Infantry Brigade (Senaki)
    - 21st Light Infantry Battalion
    - 22nd Light Infantry Battalion
    - 23rd Light Infantry Battalion
    - 21st Mixed Armored Battalion
    - Artillery Battalion
    - Logistics Battalion
    - Reconnaissance Company
    - Engineer Company
    - Signal Company
  - 3rd Infantry Brigade (The Mamluks) (Kutaisi)
    - 31st Light Infantry Battalion
    - 32nd Light Infantry Battalion
    - 33rd Mixed Armored Battalion
    - 34th Artillery Battalion
    - Logistics Battalion
    - Reconnaissance Company
    - Engineer Company
    - Signal Company
  - 6th Artillery Brigade (Khoni)
    - 61st Artillery Battalion
    - 62nd Artillery Battalion
    - 63rd Security Battalion
    - Air Defence Company
  - Naval Special Operations Company
  - Combat Engineer Battalion
  - Medical Company
  - Separate Communications Company

==== Separate Elements ====
- Aviation and Air-Defence Command
- Army Logistics Command
- Training and Education Command
- Engineer Brigade
- Separate Reconnaissance Battalion (Kobuleti)
- Separate Medical Battalion (Saguramo)
- Separate Signal Battalion
- Separate Logistics Battalion

In 2011 the Georgian high command decided to divide its military forces into two main operational units; the Eastern and Western Operational Groups. The aim was to create two independently acting military districts which would consist of forces in accordance to the strategic value of their deployment areas yet being balanced in their type of equipment. In case of war each group will be able to coordinate its operations independently from high command, having its own logistical and administrative reserves.

=== Special Operations Forces ===
The Special Operations Forces of the Defence Forces of Georgia were established to conduct unconventional warfare and the full spectrum of special operation missions. They also serve in supporting capacity for regular military forces, primarily in the areas of education and training.

Georgian special forces became first active in 1999 as part of KFOR. Georgian commandos participated in the Iraq War from 2003 until the complete withdrawal of the Georgian contingent in 2008 due to an escalation of hostilities in South Ossetia. According to independent accounts, a number of Georgian operatives were also deployed prior in Afghanistan to aide US Special Forces in hunting down Taliban leaders. Georgian officials have stated that a group of servicemen were deployed in Afghanistan for medical purposes.

=== Air Force ===
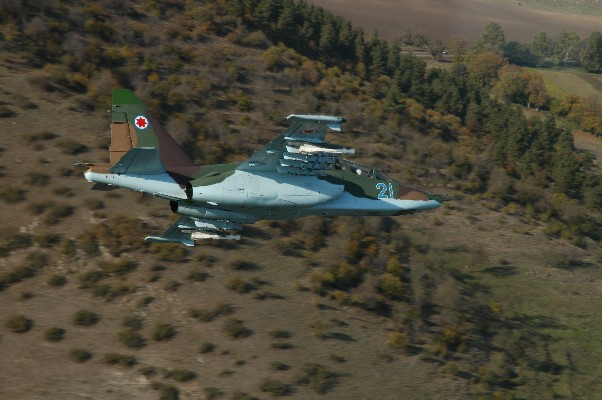
Georgian Su-25KM ground attack aircraft

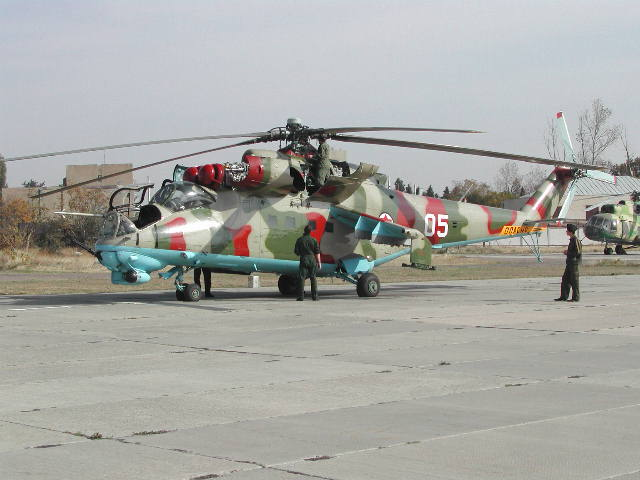
Georgian Mi-24 attack helicopter

The Georgian Air Force (Georgian: საქართველოს საჰაერო ძალები, sak'art'velos sahaero dzalebi) is the air force of the Defence Forces of Georgia. It was established as part of the Georgian Armed Forces in 1992 and merged into Army Air Section in 2010. As part of reforms in the Georgian military, the Air Force was reestablished as a separate branch of the Defence Forces in 2016. Under the leadership of Georgian Minister of Defence Irakli Garibashvili the Air Force was re-prioritized and aircraft owned by the Georgian Air Force are being modernized and re-serviced after they were left abandoned for 4 years. The Minister of Defence also announced plans to acquire strike drones to increase Georgia's combat readiness.

=== Georgian Coast Guard (Former Naval Force) ===
The Georgian Navy was abolished in 2009 and was incorporated into the Coast Guard, which is not structurally part of the Defence Forces, but rather it is a subunit of the Border Guard of Georgia, which is under the control of Ministry of Internal Affairs of Georgia. The Coast Guard of Georgia is responsible for maintenance of the sovereignty of the country and for protection of internal territorial waters and economic zones. The headquarters and a principal Coast Guard base are located at the Black Sea port of Poti.

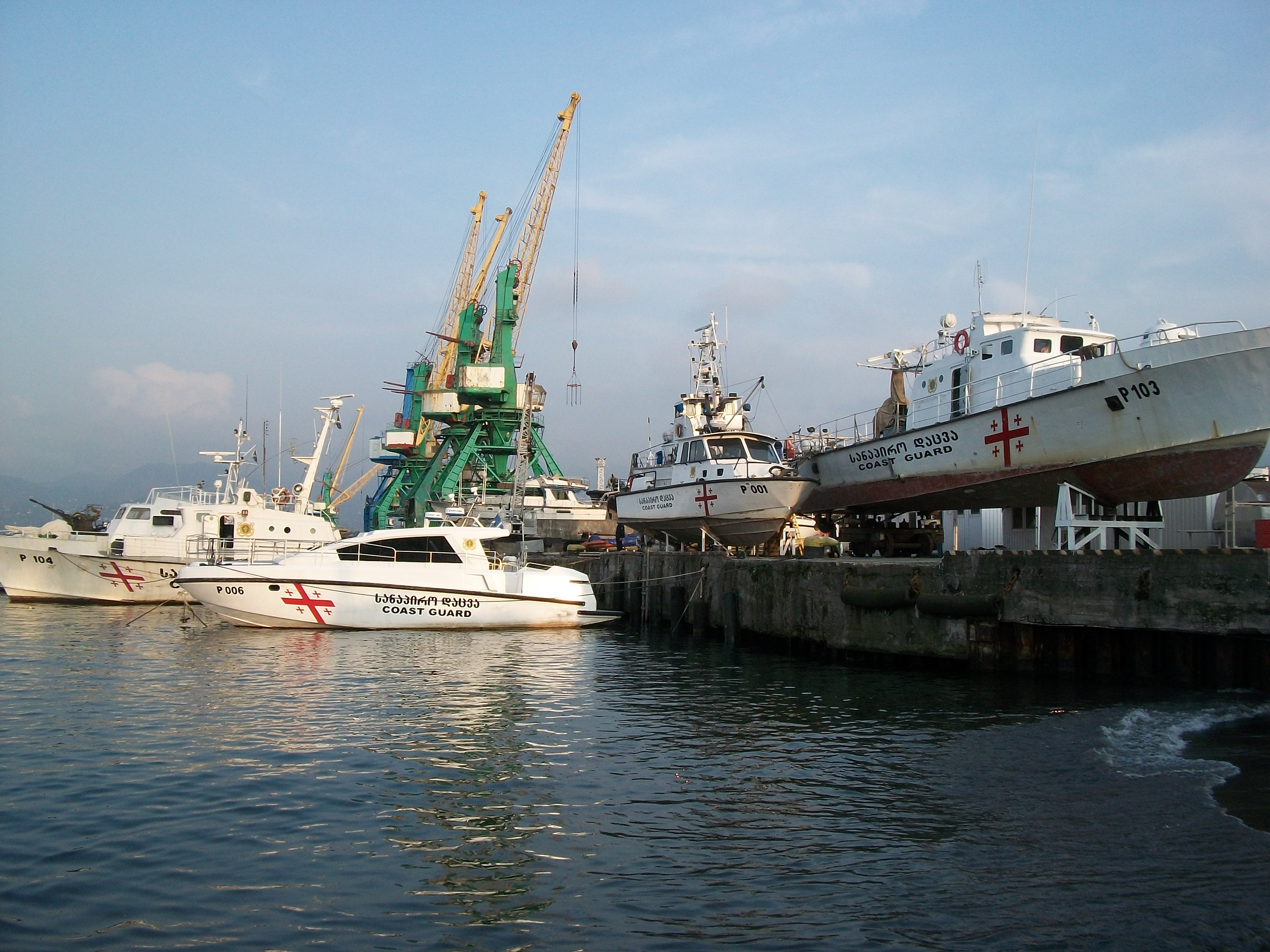
Georgian Coast Guard vessels

The other, smaller Coast Guard base is in Batumi. Besides the naval force, the navy also includes a Special Counter-terrorist Detachment force. Georgia is also one of the founding members and a participant of the Black Sea Naval Co-operation Task Group. Before the war with Russia, the Georgian navy had 19 naval vessels. Four of them were sunk during the conflict, and nine rigid-hull inflatables were captured by Russia. The Georgians raised and returned to service two of the sunken vessels, and partially replaced their losses with Turkish-built patrol/fast attack boats.

=== National Guard of Georgia ===
The National Guard of Georgia was established on 20 December 1990 and was manned mainly by volunteers. It represents the first Georgian armed formation, which became the base of the foundation for modern Defence Forces of Georgia. The Guard actively participated in the conflicts that occurred in Georgian territory (Samachablo, Abkhazia).

The National Guard used to consist of 20,554 personnel, but has now been reduced to 550.

1. Support civil government in crisis situations (natural, technological, ecological);
2. Register mobilization resources, study and deliver;
3. Convene, select and man of citizens on the basis of the agreement, for the units, subunits and bases of the Defence Forces;
4. Provide ceremonial activity support;
5. Assisting in training the Reserve Forces.

=== Army Reserve and Territorial Defence Forces ===
The Army Reserve is a professional reserve force consisting of former regular army personnel only. Due to the amount of experience, the Reserve personnel would be drawn from to replace losses in the ranks of regular formations, but will if needed operate in the vanguard of a combined mechanized group or an infantry assault.

The Territorial Defence Forces were established for immediate readiness of the population in crisis events, such as war. Its main goals would be the fortification and defence of all populated and strategically important areas as well as providing quick aid or security for evacuation operations in case of natural catastrophes.

Other than the active army reserve which consists of only ex military personnel, the Territorial Defence Forces are rather sparsely prepared for complex military operations. It instead provides more comfort for the regular forces in case of war, by acting as an additional logistical arm and leaving the actual combat to the regular forces. With the land forces and reserve army engaged in direct action, the Defence Force's most important task would be to construct trenches, bunkers and obstacles around strategically important areas and position themselves on systematically formed defensive lines. Mobilization capacity is around 140,000 troops and is reasonably large.

The TDF reservist is comparably poorly equipped for modern warfare. It is rumored that Georgia possess thousands of firearms of all types and infantry personal protection equipment inherited from the Soviet Union which could be used by reservists. Georgia also possess few dozen T-55 tanks that are in storage that could be used by the reservist forces.

=== Commissioned officers ===
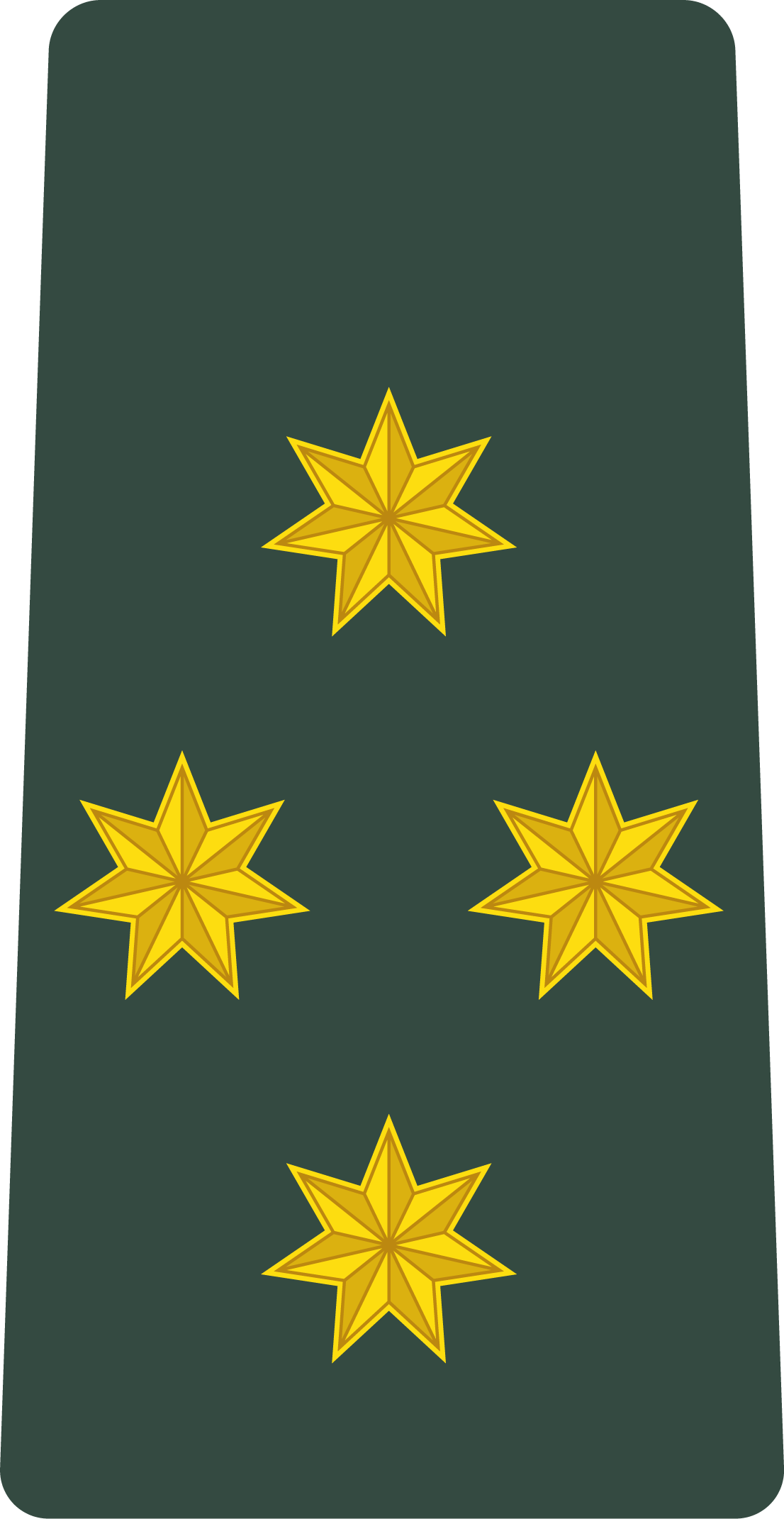
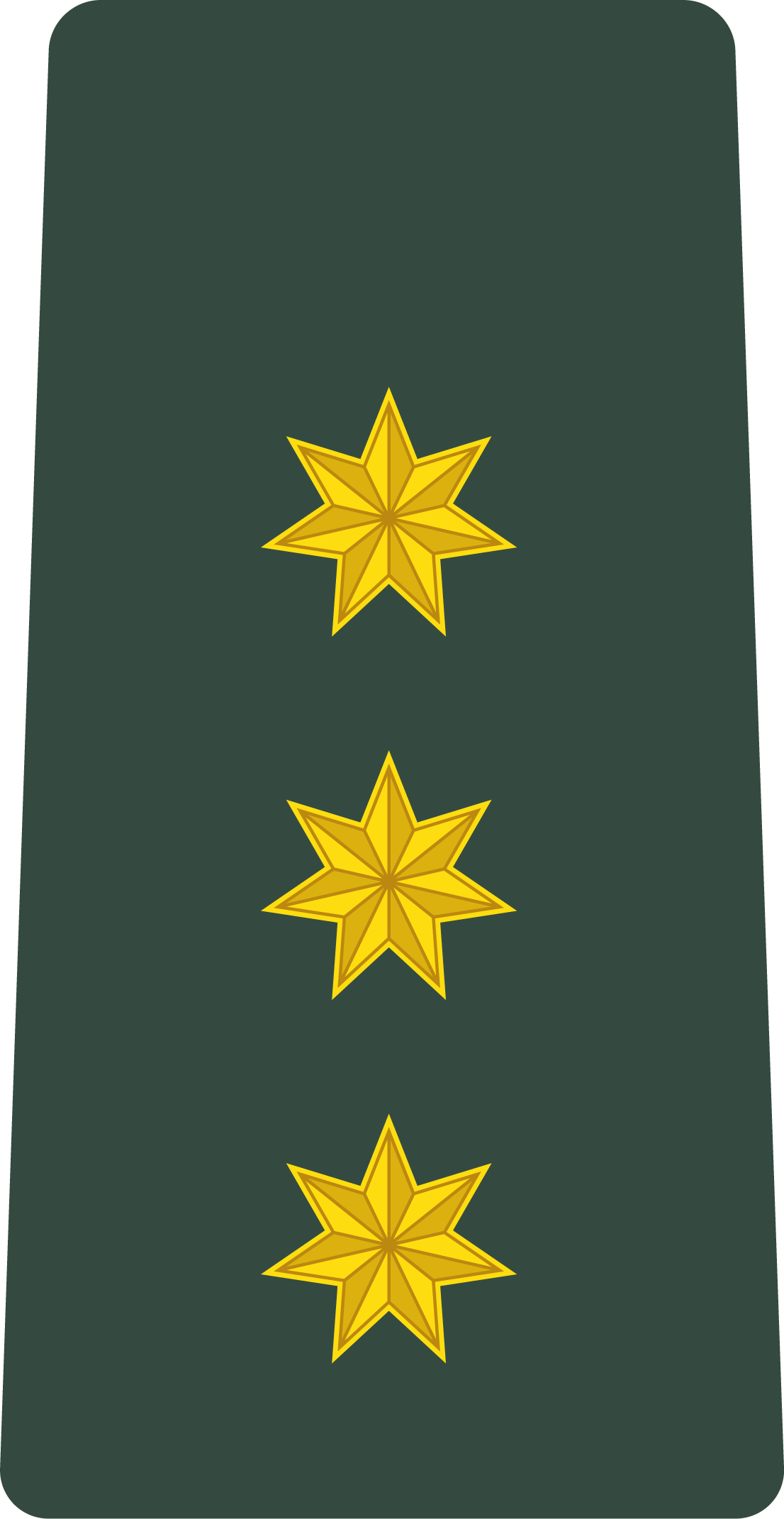
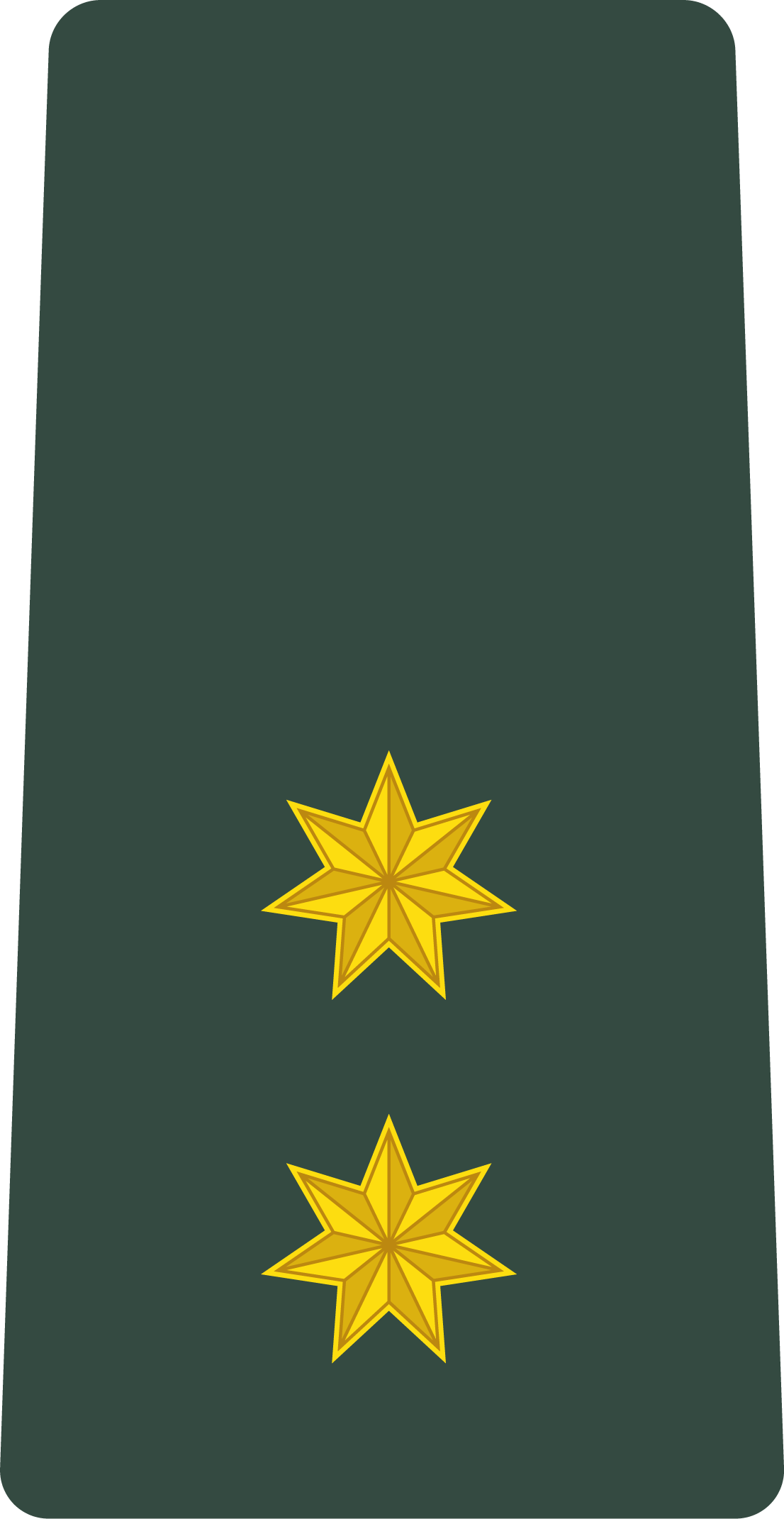
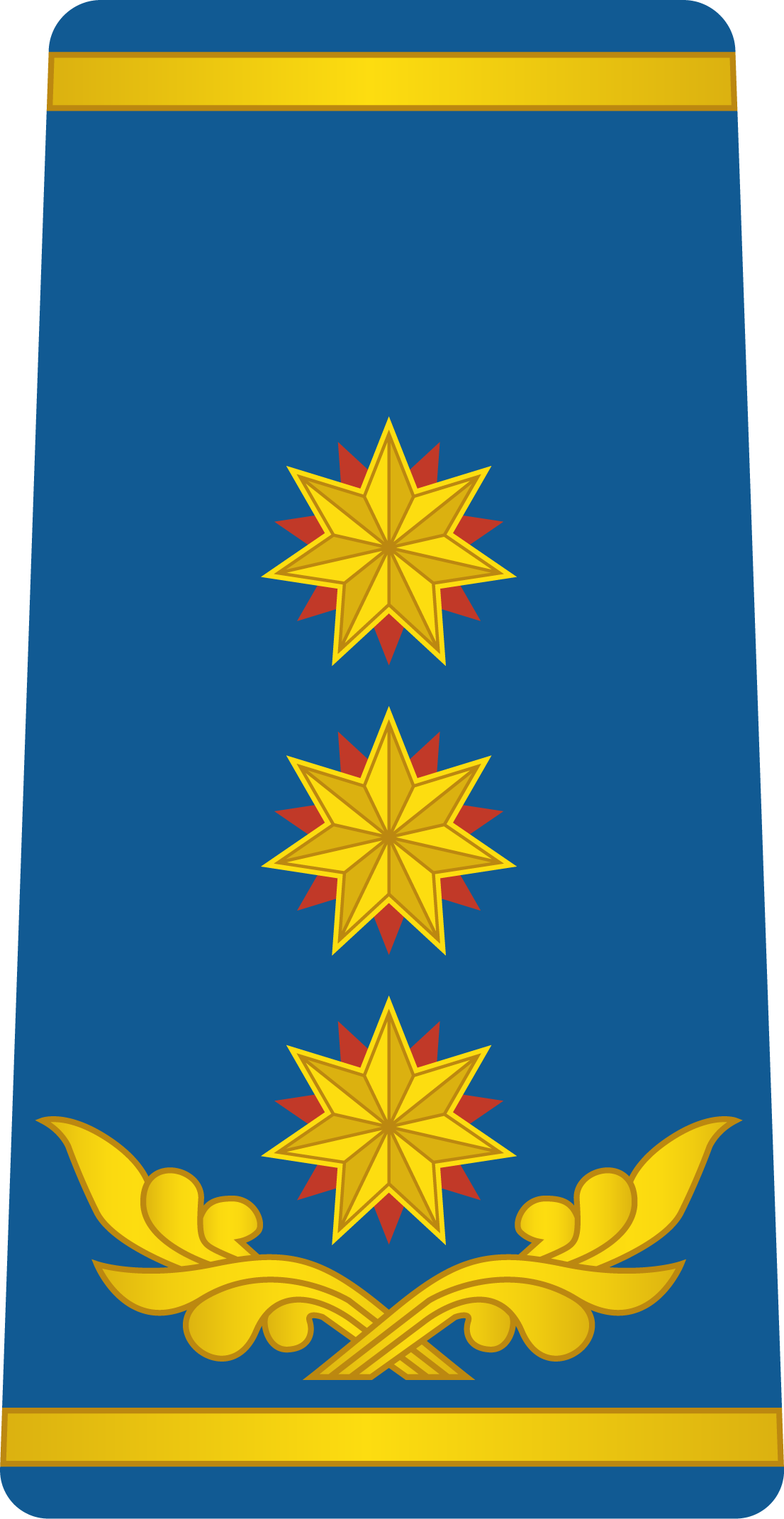
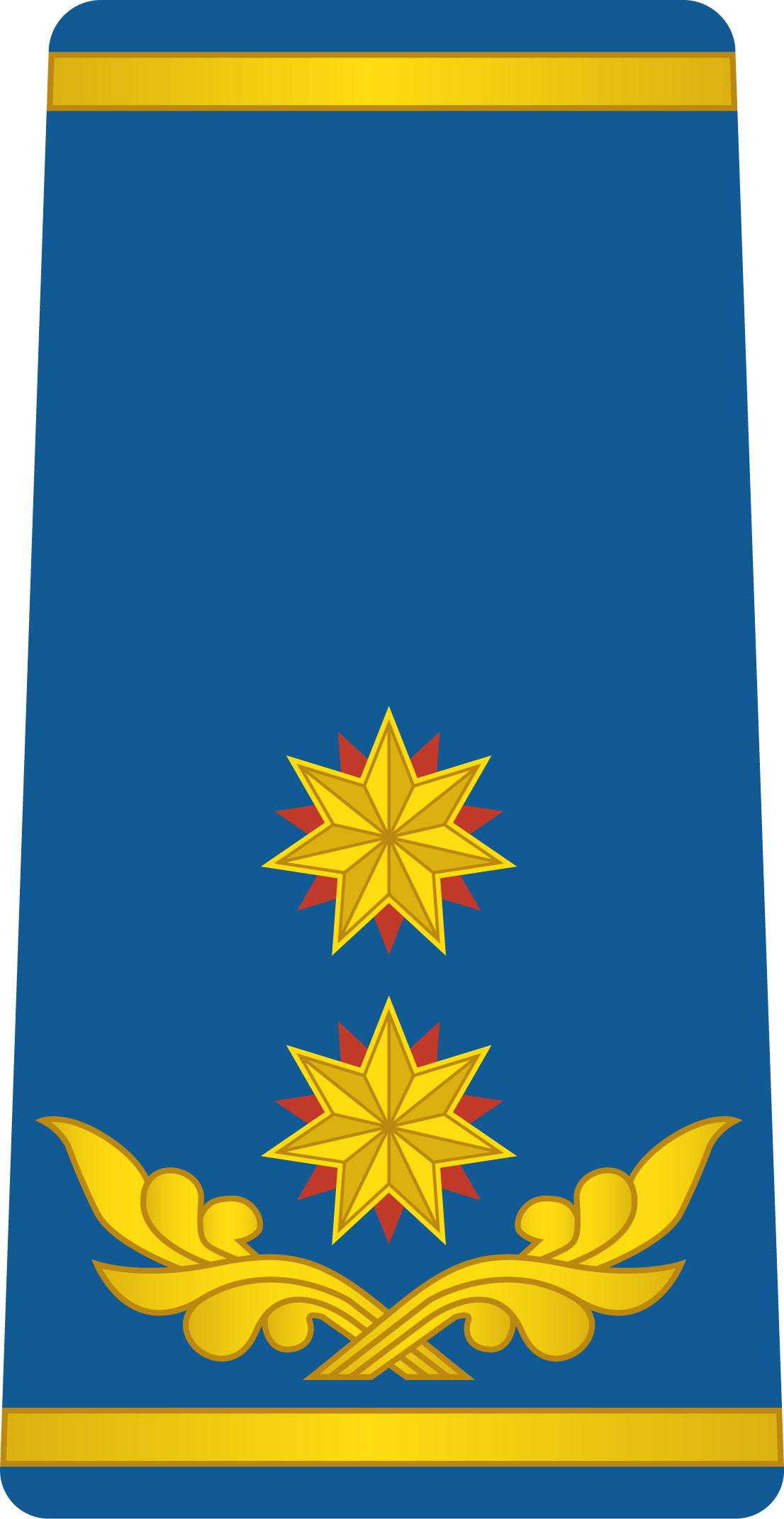
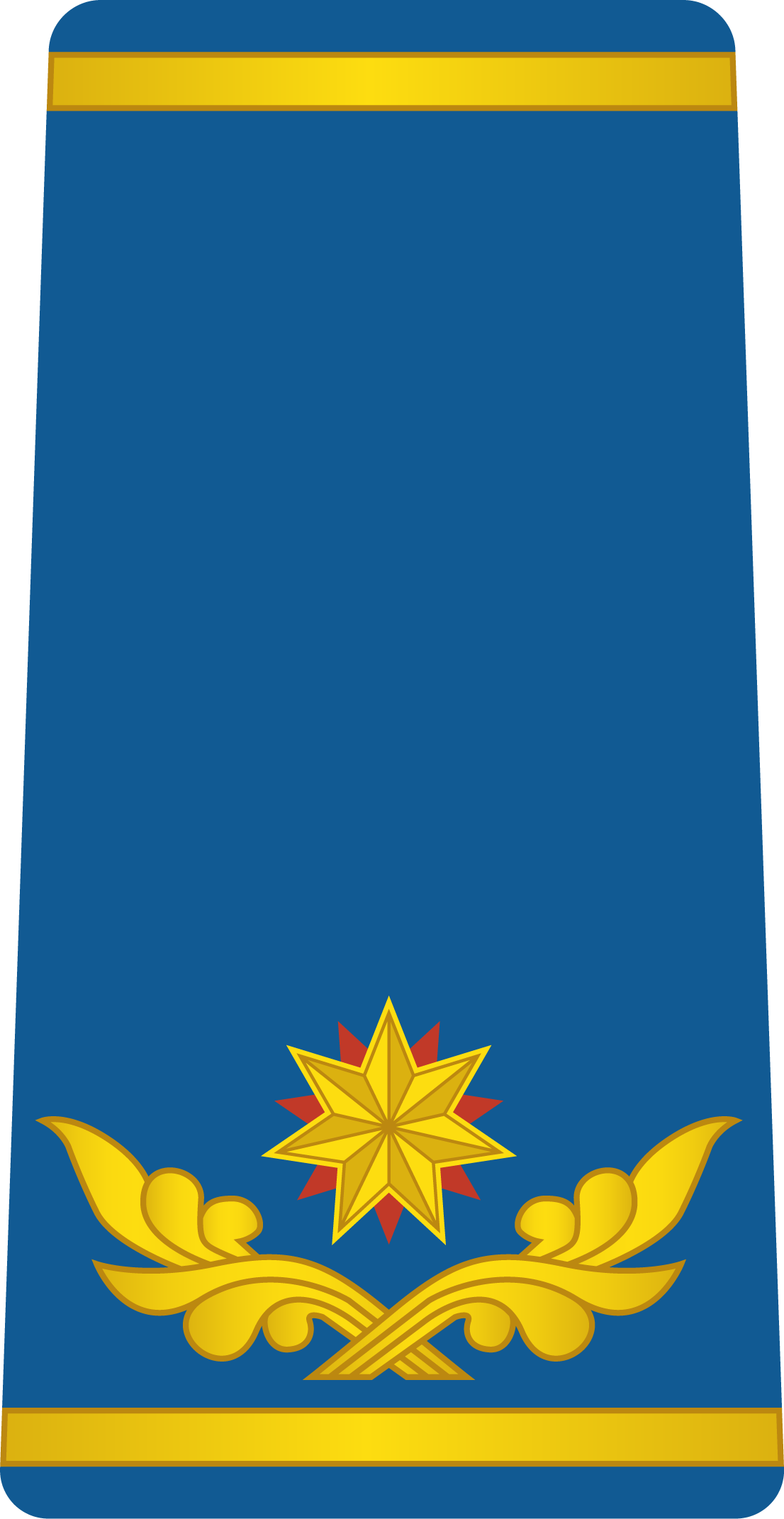
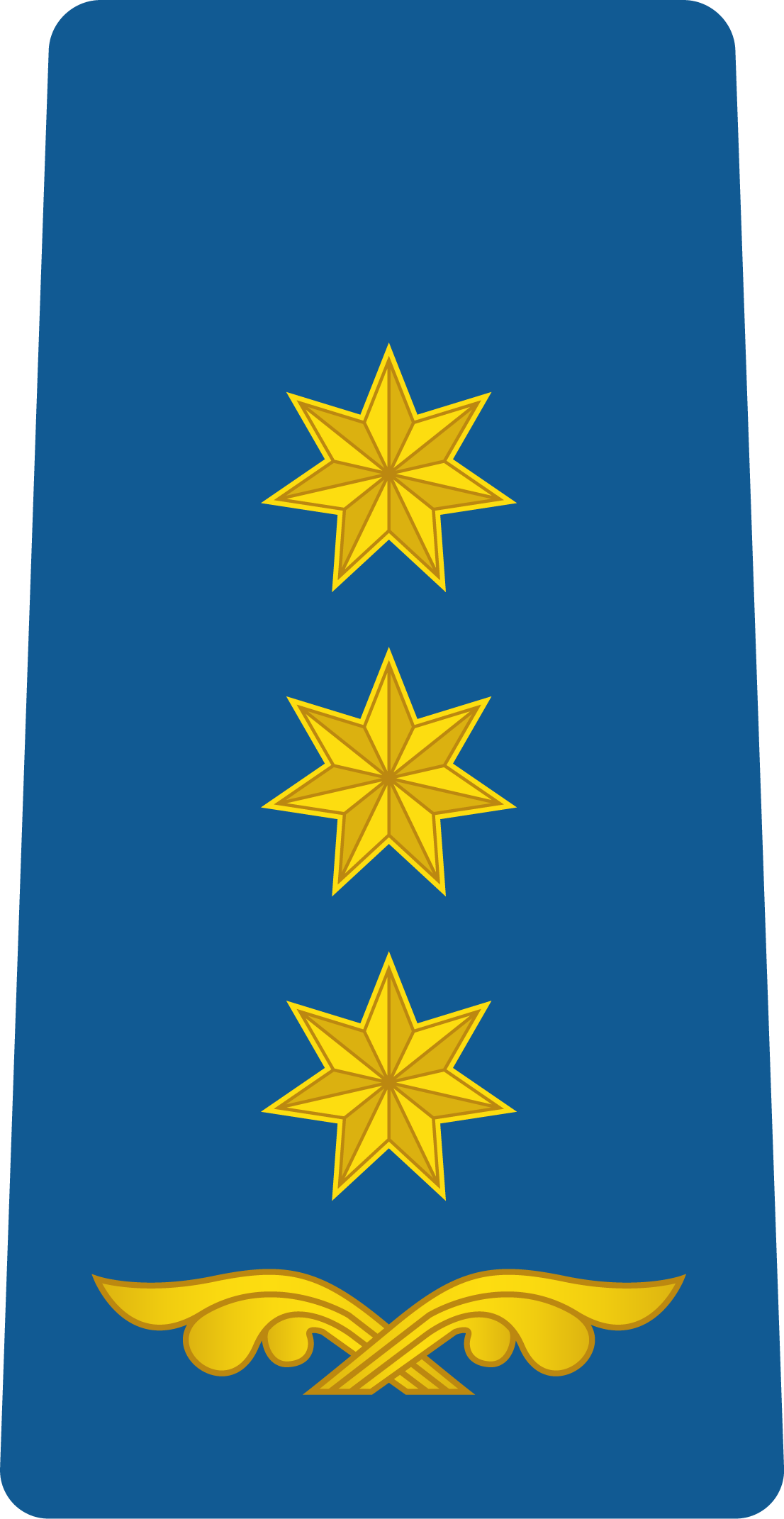
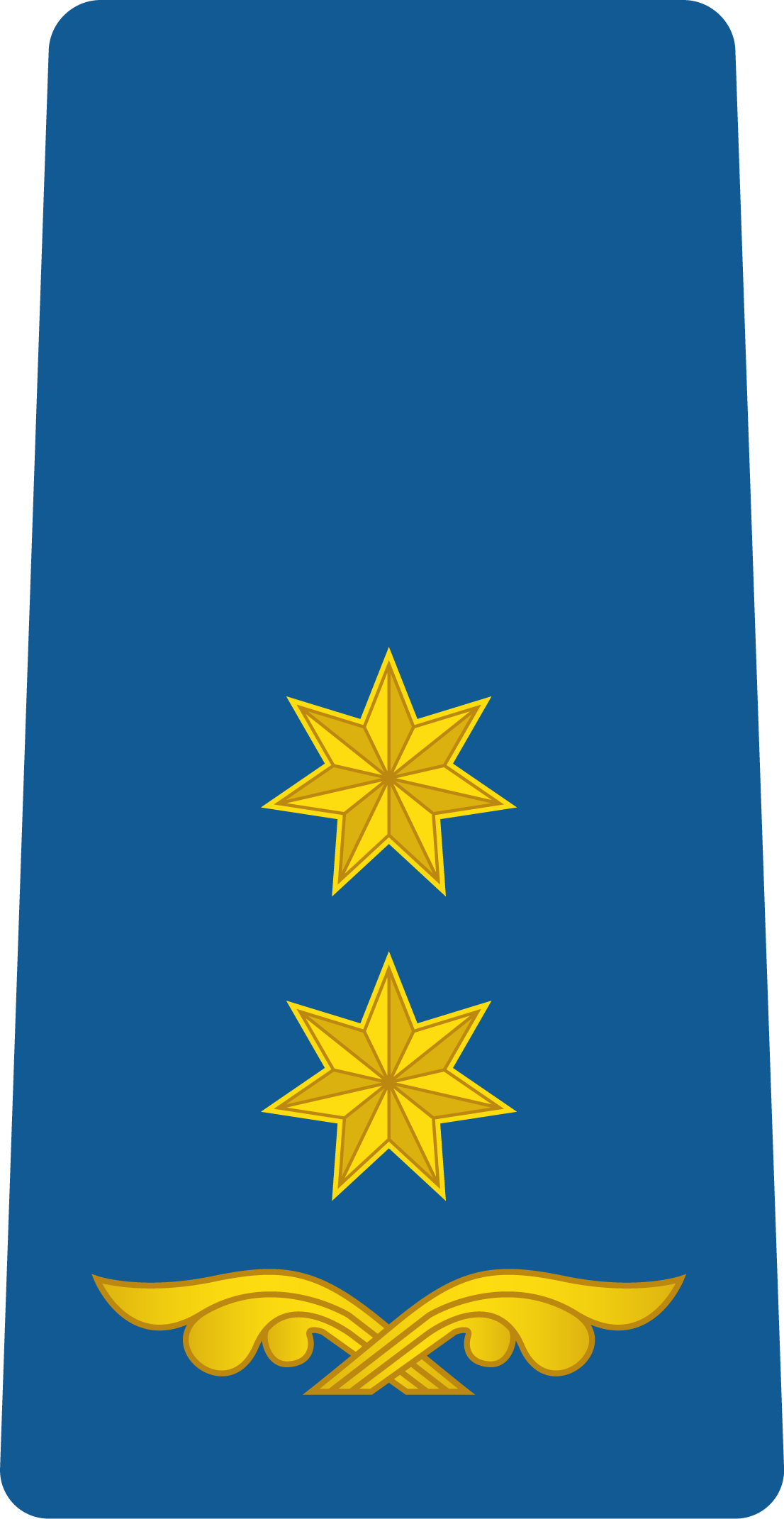
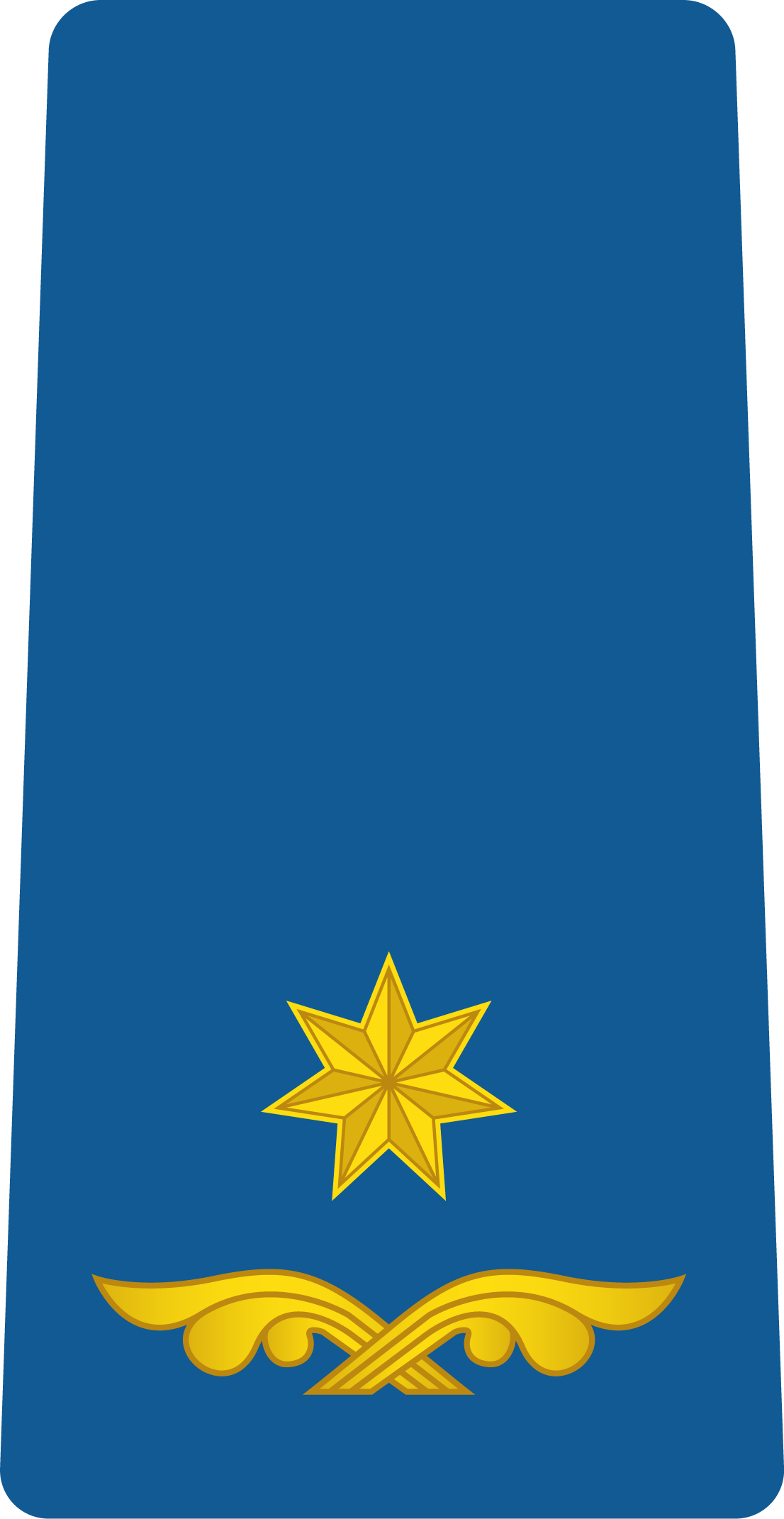
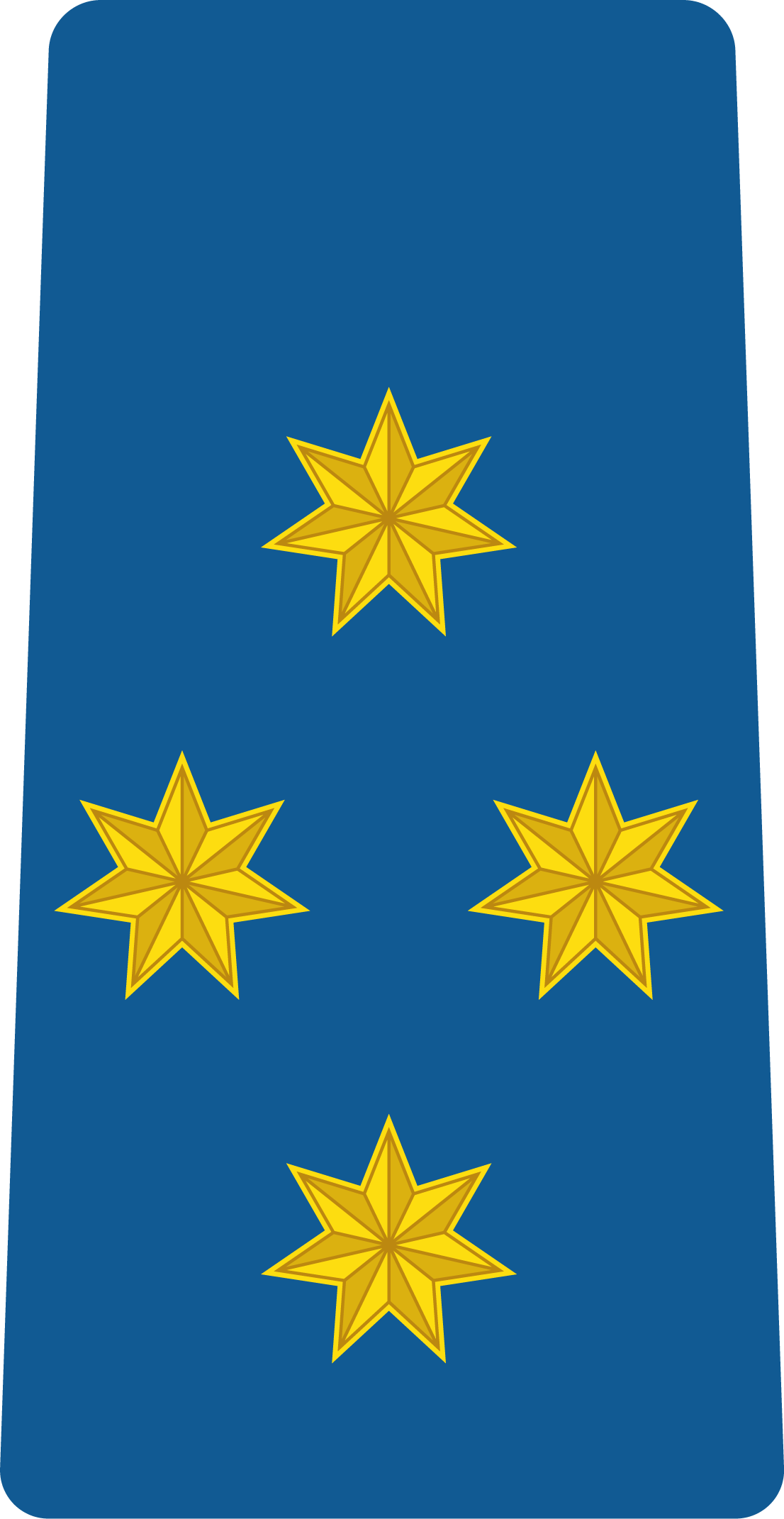
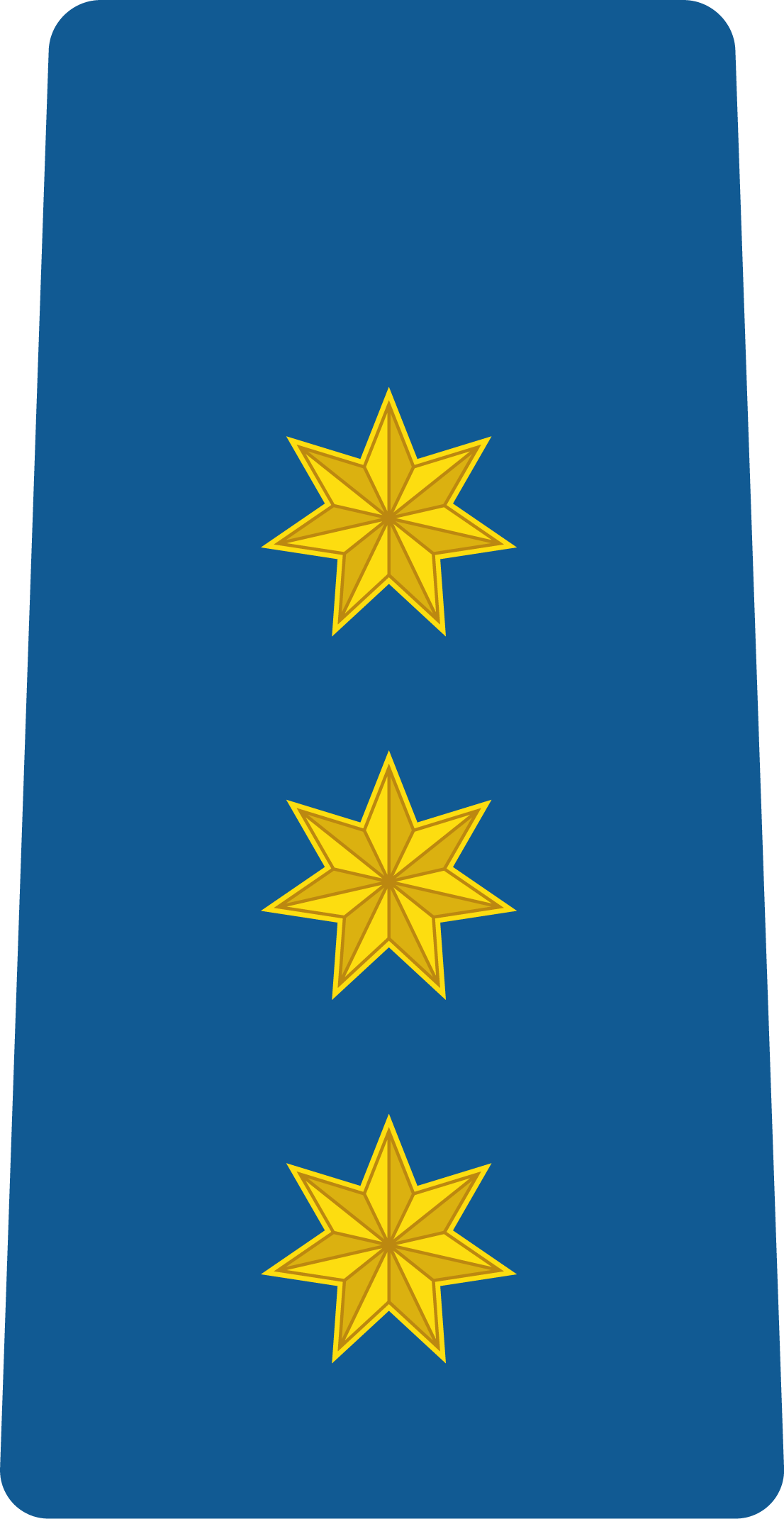
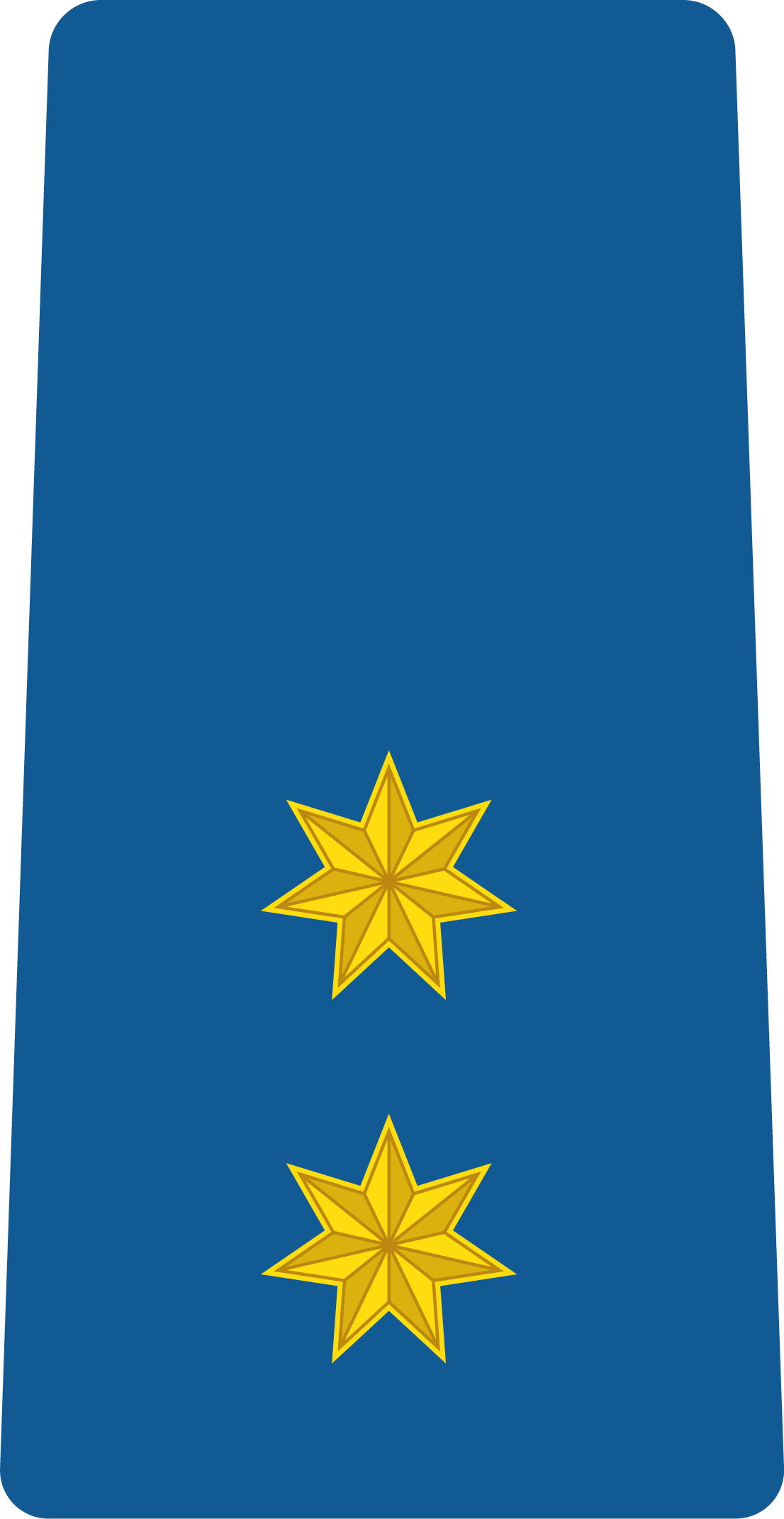
Rank group	General / flag officers				Senior officers			Junior officers
Georgian Land Forces
Georgian Land Forces	არმიის გენერალი Armiis generali	გენერალ ლეიტენანტი General leit’enant’i	გენერალ-მაიორი General-maiori	ბრიგადის გენერალი Brigadis generali	პოლკოვნიკი P’olk’ovnik’i	ვიცე-პოლკოვნიკი Vitse-p’olk’ovnik’i	მაიორი Maiori	კაპიტანი K’ap’it’ani	უფროსი ლეიტენანტი Uprosi leit’enant’i	ლეიტენანტი Leit’enant’i
Georgian Air Force
Georgian Air Force	არმიის გენერალი Armiis generali	გენერალ ლეიტენანტი General leit’enant’i	გენერალ მაიორი General maiori	ბრიგადის გენერალი Brigadis generali	პოლკოვნიკი P’olk’ovnik’i	ლეიტენანტ პოლკოვნიკი Leit’enant’ p’olk’ovnik’i	მაიორი Maiori	კაპიტანი K’ap’it’ani	უფროსი ლეიტენანტი Uprosi leit’enant’i	ლეიტენანტი Leit’enant’i
Rank group	General / flag officers				Senior officers			Junior officers

== International cooperation ==
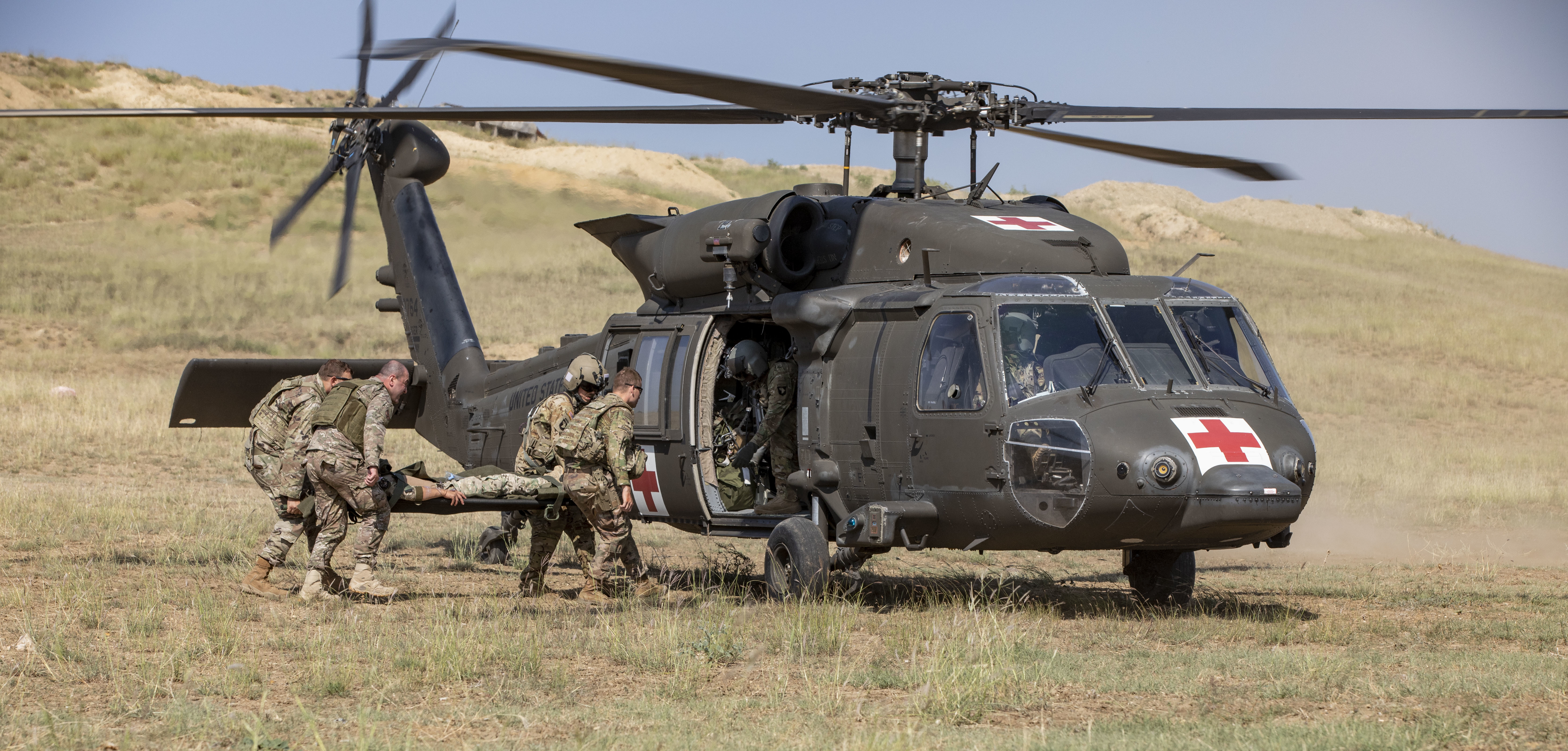
MEDEVAC training with the US Army UH-60L helicopter during exercise Noble Partner 20.

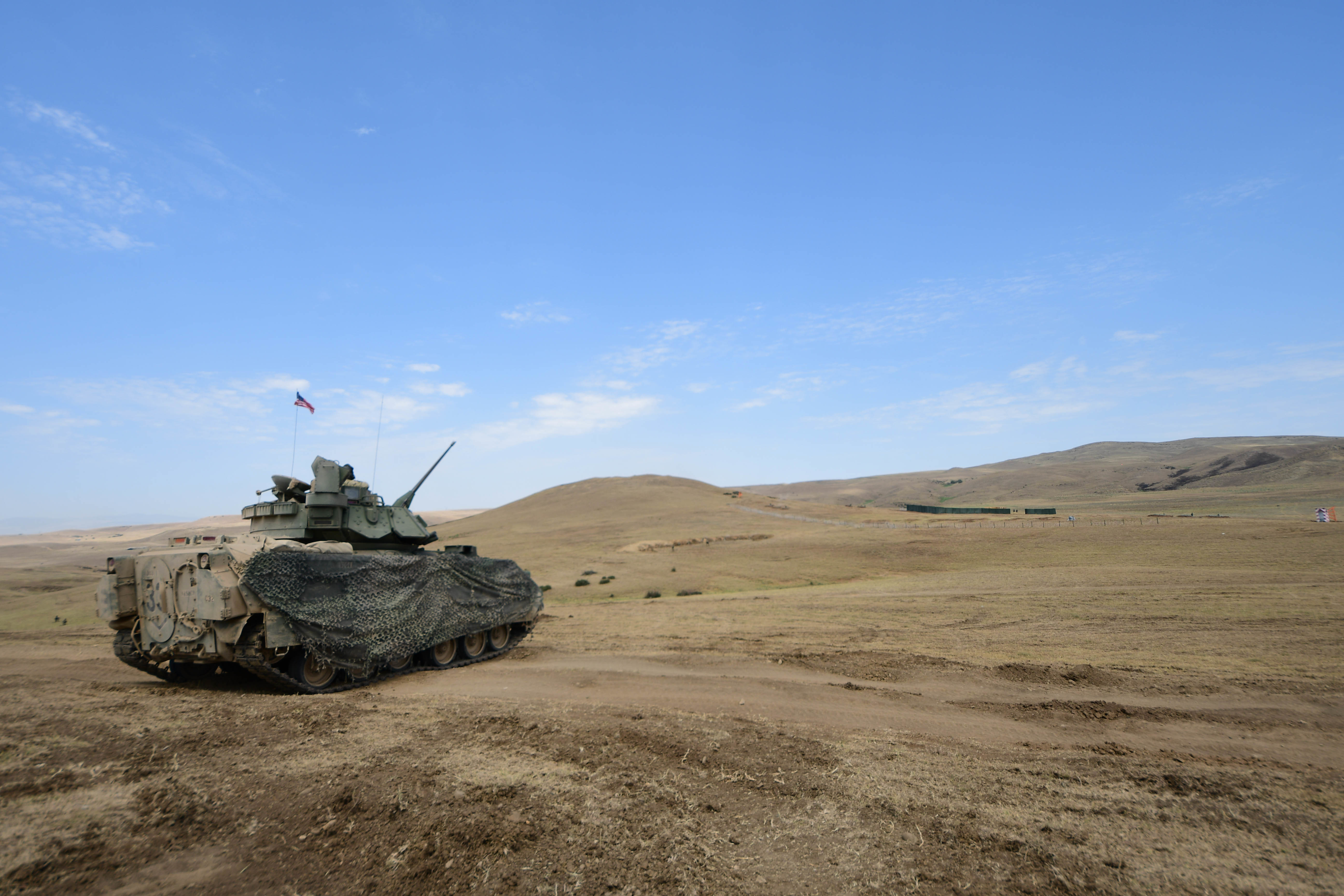
A Bradley IFV from US Army Armored Regiment (Iron Knights) maneuvers across Vaziani Military Base for Noble Partner 17.

The Georgian Defence Forces frequently have large scale military drills involving heavy armor and parachute units with their NATO counterparts on Georgian soil to increase interoperability.

=== Peacekeeping missions ===
About 200 Georgian troops were deployed in the Kosovo (KFOR) in 1999–2008, 70 were deployed in Iraq (OIF) in 2003 and 50 in Afghanistan in 2004 (ISAF). Beginning in 2004, Georgia became one of the largest non-NATO troop-contributing nations to coalition operations in Afghanistan. Over 20,000 personnel from the Georgian Armed Forces deployed to the country under the International Security Assistance Force (ISAF) and the subsequent Resolute Support Mission, primarily operating in high-risk sectors including Kabul and Helmand Province. From 2005 approximately 850 troops were serving under Coalition Command (OIF and UNAMI). In July 2007 Georgia sent an extra 1,400 troops to Iraq; that brought the total number of troops in Iraq to 2,000. About 300 of these troops were assigned to Taskforce Petro and stationed at COP Cleary outside the town of Wahida near Salman Pak, Iraq. On 8 August 2008 Georgia announced it will withdraw 1,000 troops from Iraq due to rising hostilities with Russia. Their preparedness and training skills are evaluated on highest level by international experts. The entire Iraq contingent has been airlifted back to Georgia.

Hence, owing to participation in international peacekeeping missions the military members are able to obtain practical experience and to show readiness to cooperate with NATO and with other partner countries' forces.

Currently there are more than 1,570 Georgian combat troops deployed in Helmand, Afghanistan where Georgia has thus far suffered 22 deaths and over a hundred injuries. In September 2012, Georgia stated that it would continue its contributions in Afghanistan following the 2014 NATO withdrawal.

In November 2012, Georgia had doubled the number of troops deployed to fight with Nato-led forces in Afghanistan to over 1,500. Georgia has 1,570 troops serving there, making the small Caucasus country of 4.5 million people the largest non-Nato contributor to the Afghanistan mission.

Since 2014 Georgia has contributed 140 troops to the EUFOR RCA peacekeeping mission in the Central African Republic, Georgia also contributes its military units to Resolute Support Mission in Afghanistan.

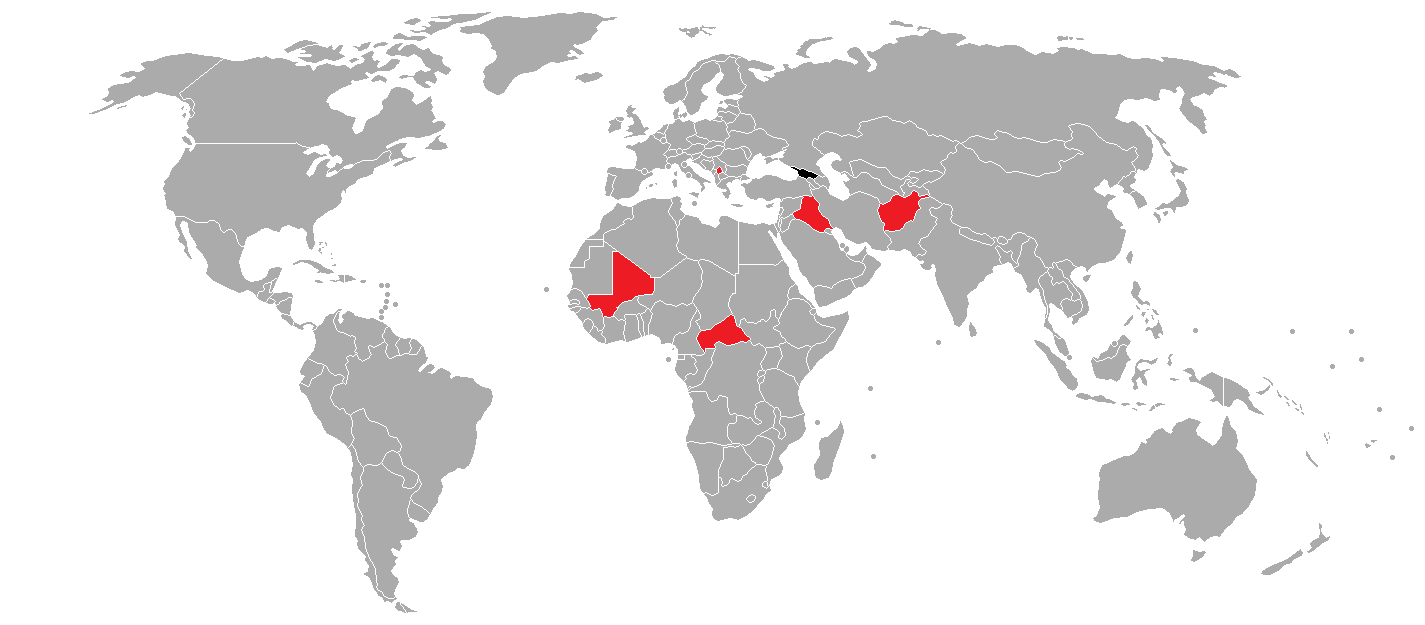
Operations abroad since 1991.

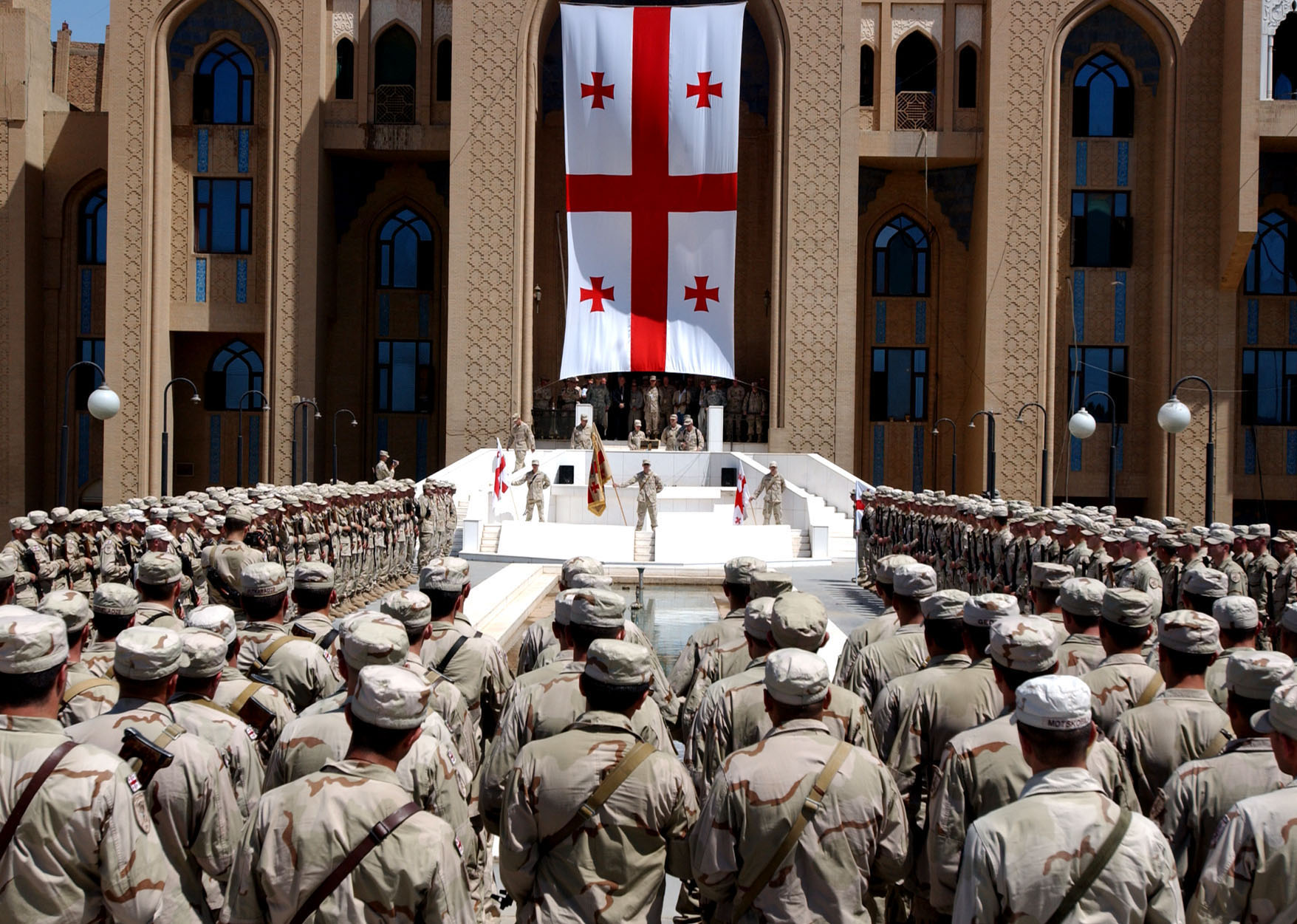
Georgian troops listening to a speech in Baghdad, Iraq

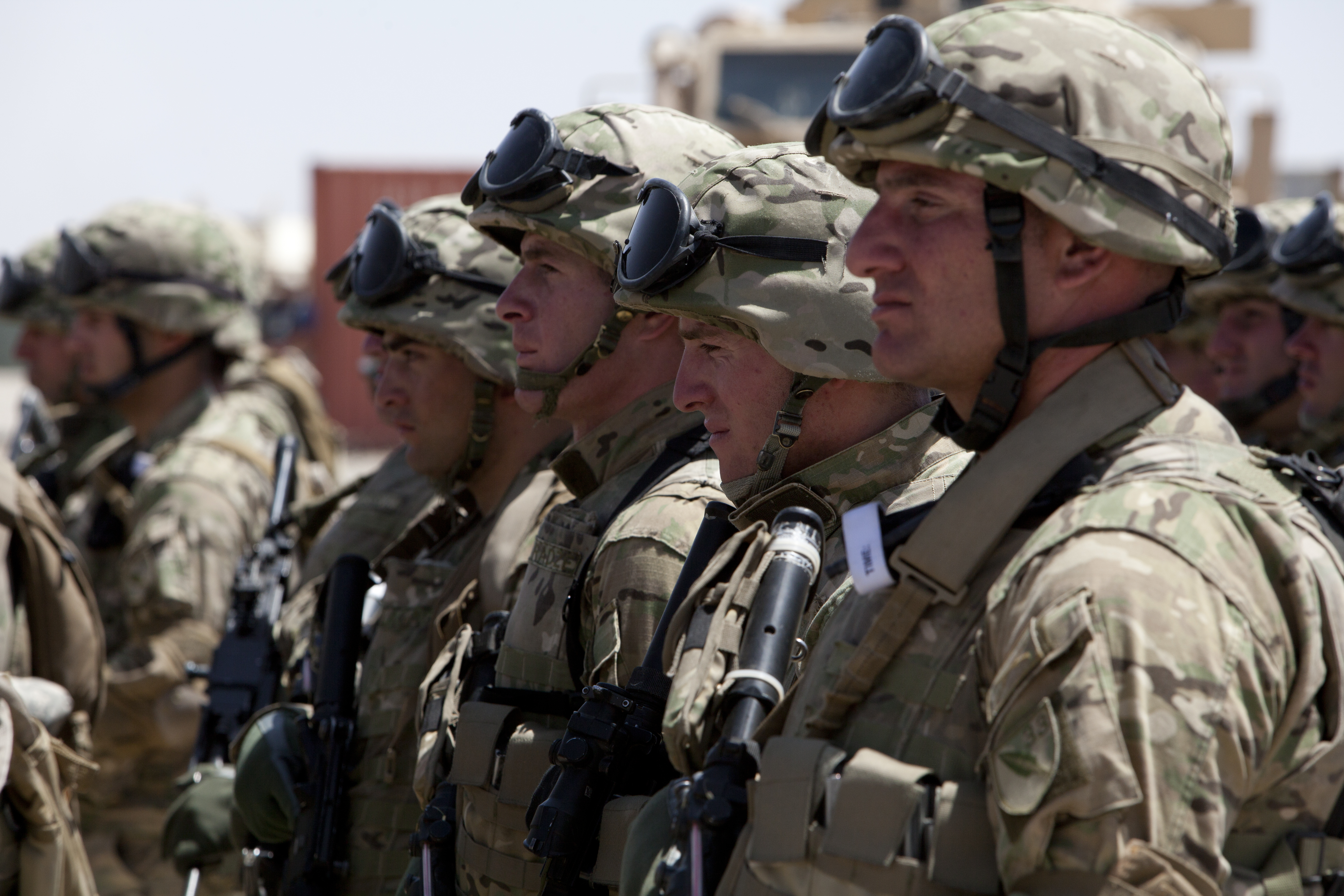
Georgian soldiers in Camp Leatherneck

== Commanders ==
The Chief of General Staff is the highest-ranking officer in the military, heading the General Staff and being the ex officio Deputy Chief of the Defence Forces, who is the commander of the Defence Forces, being appointed by the Minister of Defence. The senior enlisted advisor of the Georgian military is the Sergeant Major of the Georgian Defence Forces (Georgian: საქართველოს შეიარაღებული ძალების სერჟანტი მაიორი, romanized: sakartvelos sheiaraghebuli dzalebis serzhant'i maiori), currently Sergeant Major Koba Tsirekidze (appointed on 11 April 2016).

== Military industry ==
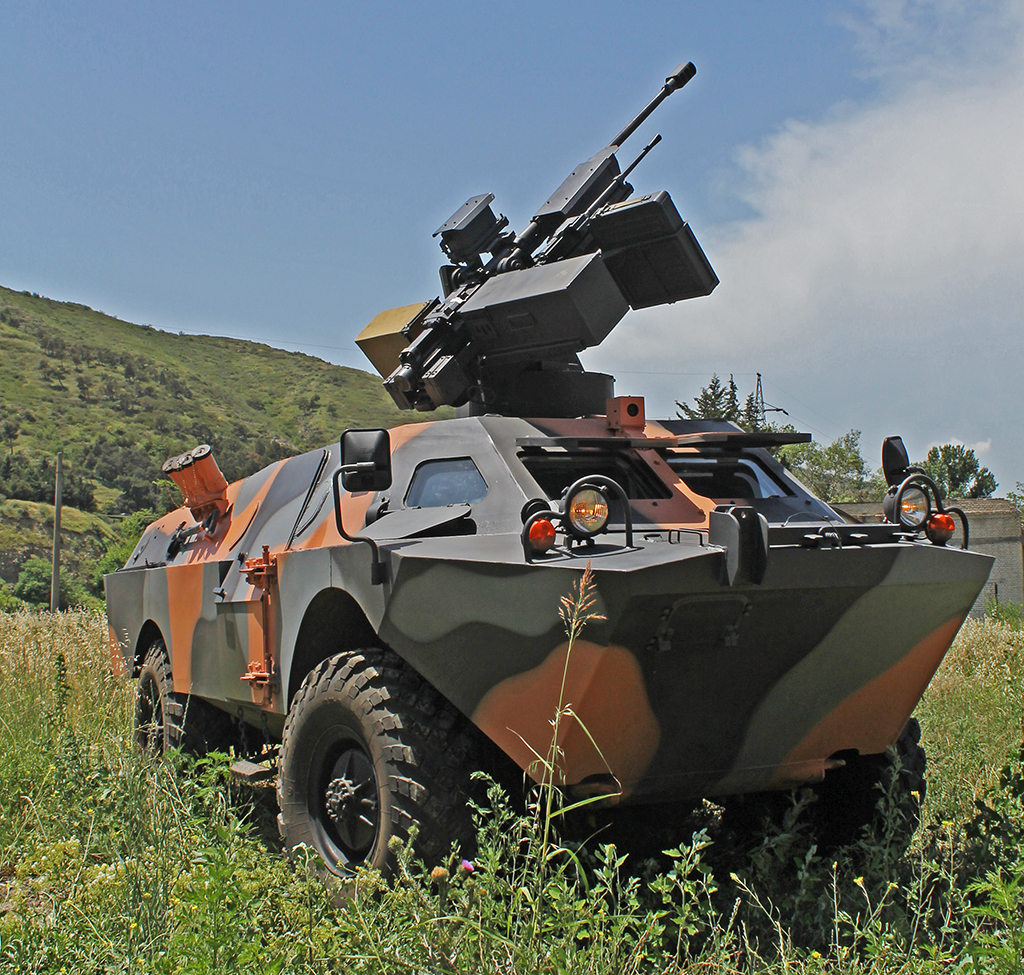
Modernized BRDM-2 of Georgian Land Forces

Georgia has a long history of weapon production tracing back to ancient times. The modern arms industry began during the Soviet era. In 1941 Georgia became one of the most important Soviet weapon manufacturing states during the Second World War. It was responsible for providing the Soviet Armed Forces with all types of aircraft and ammunition. Tbilisi Aircraft Manufacturing's role didn't change after the war. Up until 1990 Georgia was producing various types of fighter aircraft, most notably the Su-25 since it was produced almost exclusively in Georgia, unmanned areal vehicles, missiles, satellite components and orbital satellites. The company lost most of its functionality and production capability when the Soviet Union dissolved, yet was not abandoned. In the late 1990s Georgia's JSC RMP and later the newly established Ministry of Defence section "Delta" started to work on the development of ballistic equipment using their own ingredients. The advanced research unit had successfully developed a variety of personal protection gear, such as bomb disposal suits and level I-IV body armour using classified mixtures of domestic resource. These projects never went beyond some prototypes, mainly due to poor attention and financing from the government.

With foreign support primarily from the United States since 2005, Georgia became able to start building a solid industrial base for the military. From 2001 to 2007, Delta experimented with unmanned aerial vehicles and modified parts for helicopters and Su-25 aircraft until it got involved in the modification of Georgia's T-72 tank fleet. In 2009–10, with enough experience and expertise and the assistance of designer Zviad Tsikolia, Delta created its first prototype of an armored personnel carrier, the Didgori. Early tests were highly successful so that its first production line started already in 2011. Two versions would initially serve in the armed forces in 2012, followed by different modifications from 2013 on. The Lazika is Delta's attempt to manufacture a suitable modular infantry fighting vehicle created for multiple tasks. Delta considers the Lazika as one of the best vehicles of its class bearing armour technology similar to that of Israel. The remotely operated systems are locally produced as well. Due to "misdirected financing" and heavy interfering of former government officials, project Lazika was temporarily cancelled in late 2012, also due to "sabotage" and shortcomings in its armour research, but then later continued in early 2013 when a newly elected government took charge.

As of 2007 Georgia has been domestically producing uniforms for its military personnel. Other main production lines include various types of artillery systems such as MLRS, mortars and corresponding ammunition, anti-tank weapons and devices, full uniform sets for ceremonies and for all service branches, including boots, hats, assault vests, pouches, and backpacks. New kind of ballistic vests and helmets have been developed and produced for military service since 2013. The Georgian production uses techniques based on know-how from aerospace research whose methods differ slightly yet significantly from foreign ones. In 2018 plans were announced for decisive expansions in manufacturing capabilities. With assistance from the United States and Israel, a weapon manufacturing plant was established for the development and production of AR-15 based firearms.

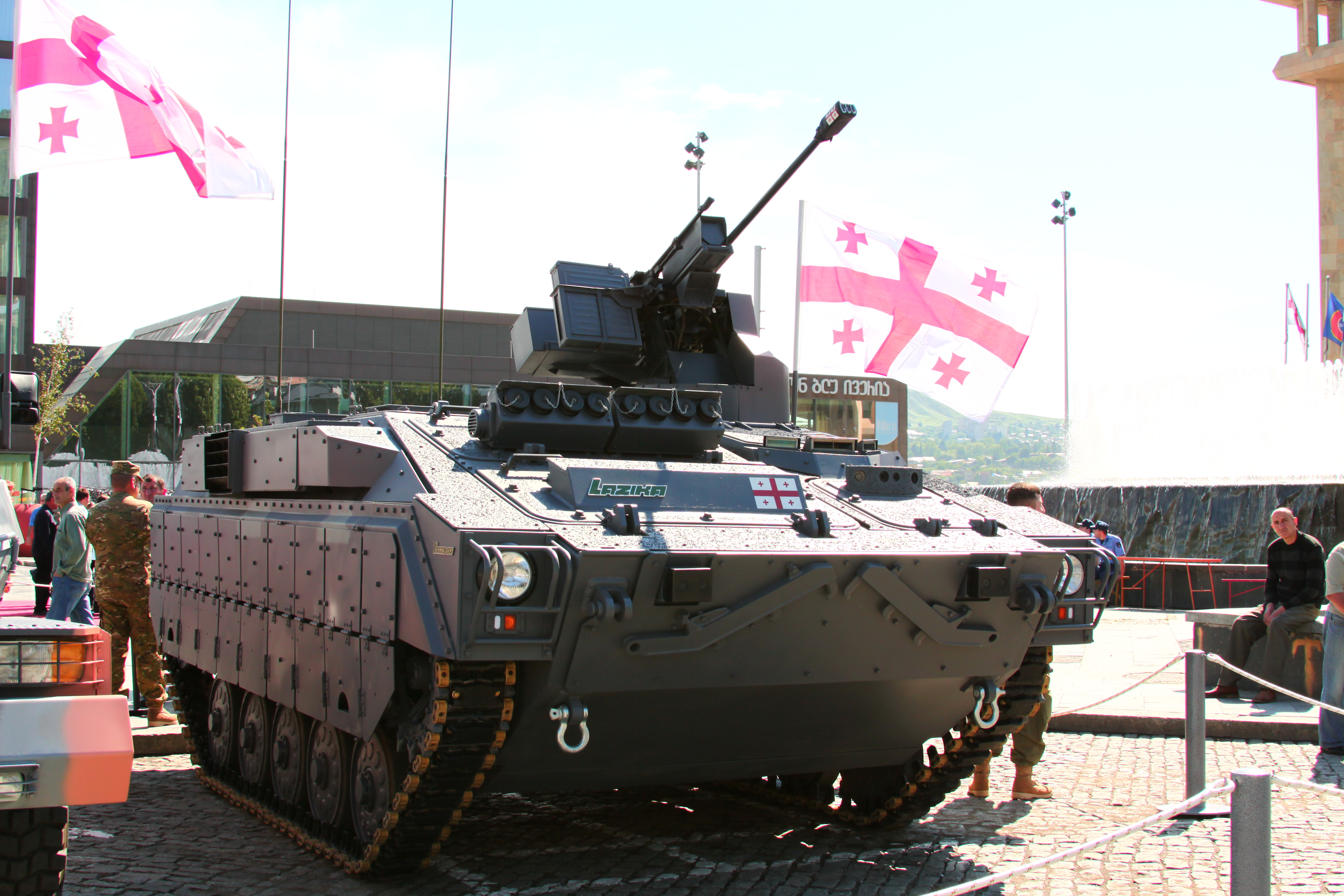
Georgian made Lazika IFV

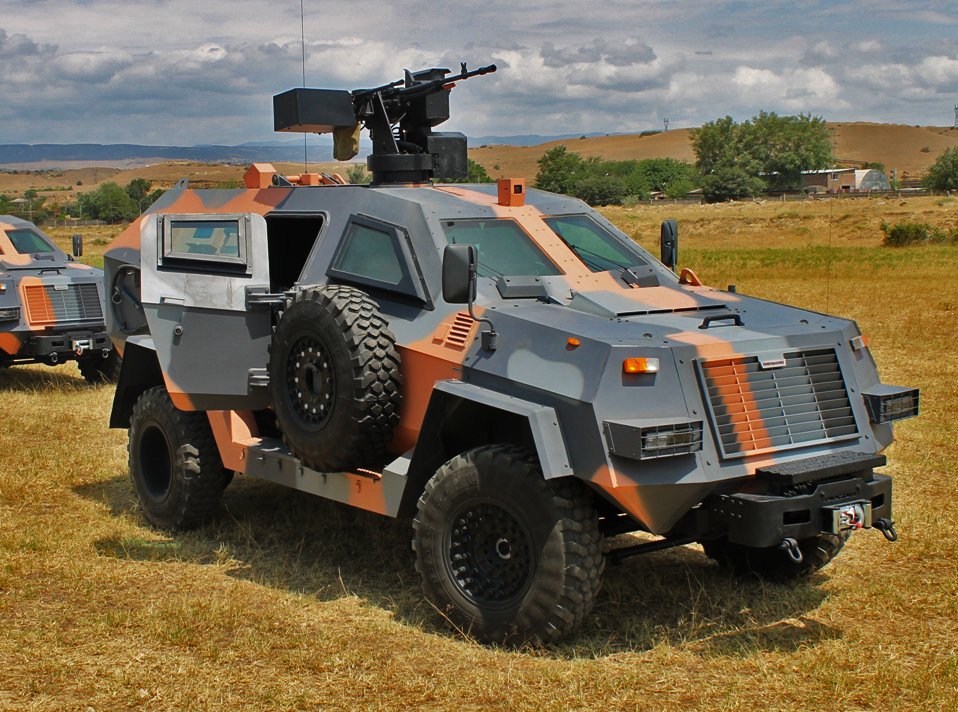
Georgian made Didgori-2

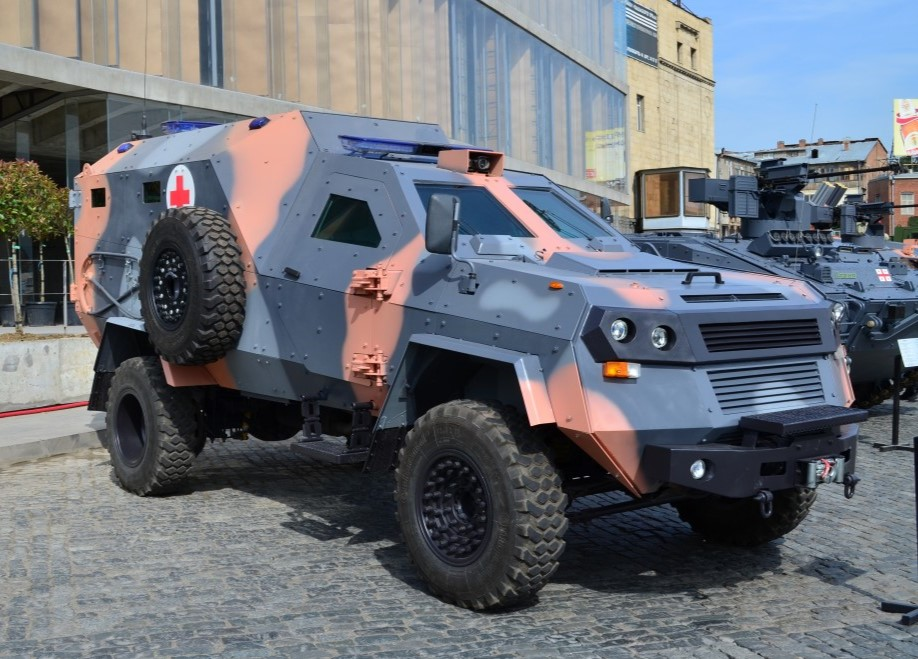
Georgian made Didgori Medevac

== Bases ==
Name	Location
Ministry of Defence Headquarters	Tbilisi
Vaziani Military Base	near Tbilisi
Krtsanisi Military Base	near Tbilisi
Akhalkalaki Military Base	Akhalkalaki
Alekseevka Airbase	near Tbilisi
Marneuli Airbase	Marneuli
Bolnisi Airbase	near Tbilisi
Gori Military Base	Gori
Senaki Military Base	Senaki
Mukhrovani Military Base	Mukhrovani
Kutaisi Military Base	Kutaisi
Khelvachauri Military Base	Khelvachauri
Khoni Military Base	Khoni

== See also ==
- Georgia and NATO
- List of equipment of the Defence Forces of Georgia
