= Zviad Tsikolia =

Georgian industrial designer

- ზვიად ციკოლია
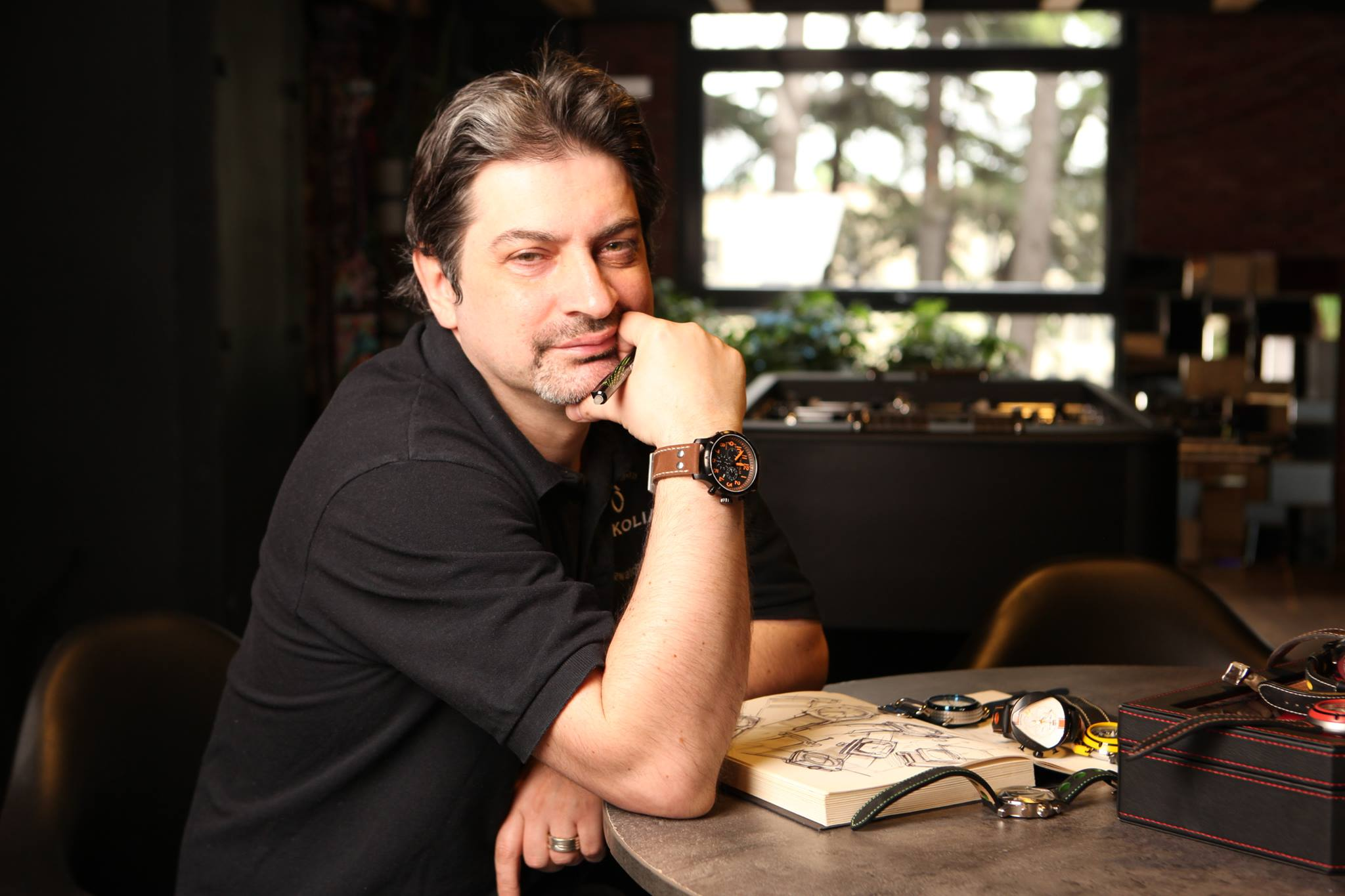
- Born: July 14, 1971 (age 54); Tbilisi, Georgian SSR
- Citizenship: Georgian
- Occupation: Industrial designer
- Awards: Red Dot Design Award for Fashion Watch (2006), the Honor Award (2011), the Vakhtang Gorgasali Order of 2nd degree (2013), Red Dot for packing design (2014).
- Website: www.tsikoliadesign.com

Zviad Tsikolia (Georgian: ზვიად ციკოლია) (born 1971) is a Georgian industrial designer. He was the founder of his own watch company, UNIQ, now known as TSIKOLIA.

== Biography ==
Zviad Tsikolia was born in Tbilisi, Georgia. Zviad studied at the Tbilisi State Academy of Arts, faculty of Industrial Design.

His first success was at the republic-wide competition at Poti in 1986, where his truck design won the Grand Prix. In 1987, Zviad was awarded the bronze medal on the Exhibit of People's Achievements in Moscow, where he presented his trailer design. In 1993 he became a leading designer at Air Georgia. One of the milestone achievements was the Frankfurt Auto Show in 1997, where Zviad presented his Bugatti Concept Car. In 2001, Zviad received an invitation from Peugeot on the position of a consultant. His Luxury Russo-Baltique Impression was exhibited in Villa d'Este in 2006 and at the Geneva Auto Show in 2007. He was hired as a leading designer by the Japanese company DCI in the same year. Zviad moved to a Georgian design bureau Delta in 2010 where he designed first Georgian armored vehicle Didgori. Zviad regularly takes part in a number of projects. He founded his own watch company UNIQ in 2011. In 2013–2014 he worked as a consultant to the company SAIC Motor, where he designed interior for the car concepts in development.

Tsikolia lives in Tbilisi. He is married to Marina Khorava, also a Georgian designer. They have two children, Buba and Iva.

== Awards ==
- 1987 – Bronze medal awarded on the Exhibit of People's Achievements, Moscow;
- 1993 – Winner of the competition Air Georgia;
- 2001 – Winner of the Russo-Baltique competition;
- 2006 – Red Dot Design Award for the design of the Fashion Watch;
- 2011 – Medal of Honor (Georgia);
- 2013 – Vakhtang Gorgasali medal of 2nd degree;
- 2014 – Red Dot Design Award for the packaging design.
- 2024 German design award winner for KOLKHI’S sunglasses.
- 2024 French design Gold award winner for KOLKHI’S sunglasses.
