= Ministry of Economy and Sustainable Development (Georgia) =

Government ministry of Georgia

Ministry of Economy and Sustainable Development of Georgia
- საქართველოს ეკონომიკისა და მდგრადი განვითარების სამინისტრო
- Coat of Arms of Georgia

Agency overview
- Formed: 1992
- Jurisdiction: Government of Georgia
- Headquarters: Sanapiro Str. N2, Tbilisi, Georgia 0114
- Annual budget: ₾558.2 million (USD 210.2 million) (2023)
- Agency executive: Mariam Kvrivishvili (24 June 2025–Disputed) Minister of Economy and Sustainable Development
- Child agency: United Transport Administration
- Website: www.economy.ge

The Ministry of Economy and Sustainable Development (Georgian: საქართველოს ეკონომიკური განვითარების სამინისტრო) is a ministry of the government of Georgia in charge of regulating economic activity in the country. Its head office is in Tbilisi. It is currently headed by Mariam Kvrivishvili.

== Structure ==
The Ministry of Economic Development was established after dissolution of Soviet Union. It was renamed to Ministry of Economy and Sustainable Development during government restructuring in 2010.

The main functions of the ministry are to provide incentives for economic growth in the country utilizing an effective economic policy. The economic policies of the state are described in the action plan of the Georgian Government for 2004–2009 titled For United and Powerful Georgia. The policies include utilization of macroeconomic policy and private entrepreneurship development. The economic reforms undertaken by the government include liberalization of entrepreneurial activities, creation of favorable, transparent and stable legislation for private business owners; realization of active privatization process and support to strengthening of private sector; facilitation of issuance of licenses and permits and reform of the system of technical regulation; economic deregulation and protection of markets against monopolization; development of tourism, transport and communication infrastructure, etc.

== Budget ==
The budget of the Ministry of Economy and Sustainable Development in 2023 is GEL 558.2 million (USD 210.2 million), down by 374.2 million (USD 140.9 million) compared to 2022.

== Sub-agencies ==
- United Transport Administration

== Ministers ==
- Vladimir Papava, 1994–2000
- Ivane Chkhartishvili, 2000–2001
- Giorgi Gachechiladze, 2001–2003
- Irakli Rekhviashvili, November 2003 – June 2004
- Kakha Bendukidze, June 2004 – December 2004
- Lekso Aleksishvili, December 2004 – June 2005
- Irakli Chogovadze, June 2005 – November 2006
- Irakli Okruashvili, November 2006
- Giorgi Arveladze, November 2006 – January 2008
- Eka Sharashidze, January 2008 – December 2008
- Lasha Zhvania, December 2008 – August 2009
- Zurab Pololikashvili, August 2009 – July 2010
- Vera Kobalia, July 2010–25 October 2012
- Giorgi Kvirikashvili, 25 October 2012 – 2015
- Dimitri Kumsishvili, 1 September 2015 – 2018
- Giorgi Kobulia, 1 September 2018 – 18 April 2019
- Natela Turnava, 18 April 2019 – 9 February 2022
- Levan Davitashvili, 9 February 2022 – 24 June 2025
- Mariam Kvrivishvili, 24 June 2025 – Present (Disputed)
