= Dimitri Kumsishvili =

Georgian politician

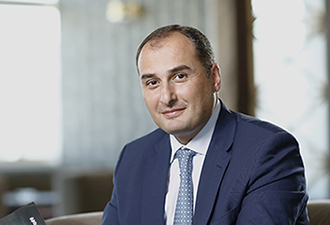

First Deputy Prime Minister of Georgia
- In office 13 June 2016 – 13 June 2018
- Prime Minister: Giorgi Kvirikashvili
- Preceded by: Giorgi Kvirikashvili (2015)
- Succeeded by: Maya Tskitishvili (2021)

Minister of Finance
- In office 27 November 2016 – 13 November 2017
- Prime Minister: Giorgi Kvirikashvili
- Preceded by: Nodar Khaduri
- Succeeded by: Mamuka Bakhtadze

Minister of Economy and Sustainable Development
- In office 13 November 2017 – 13 June 2018
- Prime Minister: Giorgi Kvirikashvili
- Preceded by: Giorgi Gakharia
- Succeeded by: Giorgi Cherkezishvili
- In office 1 September 2015 – 27 November 2016
- Prime Minister: Irakli Gharibashvili; Giorgi Kvirikashvili
- Preceded by: Giorgi Kvirikashvili
- Succeeded by: Giorgi Gakharia

Deputy Prime Minister of Georgia
- In office 30 December 2015 – 13 June 2016
- Prime Minister: Giorgi Kvirikashvili

Personal details
- Born: 7 September 1974 (age 52)
- Party: Georgian Dream (until June 2018)
- Education: Tbilisi State University

Dimitri Kumsishvili (Georgian: დიმიტრი ქუმსიშვილი; born 7 September 1974) is a Georgian politician who has served as the country's First Deputy Prime Minister from 27 November 2016 to 13 June 2018 and Minister of Economy and Sustainable Development from 13 November 2017 to 13 June 2018.

== Biography ==
A graduate of the Tbilisi State University with a degree in physics (1992) and economics (1998), Kumsishvili worked as an executive for various businesses in Georgia, including being Deputy General Director of Cartu Bank, owned by the tycoon Bidzina Ivanishvili, from 19979 to 2011 and Director for Business Development of the media holding Palitra Media from 2011 to 2012. After Ivanishvili-led Georgian Dream became a ruling party in 2012, Dimitry Kumsiashvili joined the government as Deputy Minister of Economy and Sustainable Development and Head of National Agency of State Property until being appointed Deputy Mayor of Tbilisi in 2015. He then served as Minister of Economy and Sustainable Development from 1 September 2015 to 28 October 2016 and, simultaneously, as Vice Prime Minister since 30 December 2015. On 27 November 2016, he became First Deputy Prime Minister and Minister of Finance in the Second Cabinet of Giorgi Kvirikashvili. On 13 November 2017, he was moved to the position of Minister of Economy, a position he held until early June 2018.

Political offices
Preceded by Nodar Khaduri	Minister of Finance; 2016–2017	Succeeded by Mamuka Bakhtadze
