= Levan Davitashvili =

First Deputy Prime Minister of Georgia (since 2024)

- ლევან დავითაშვილი
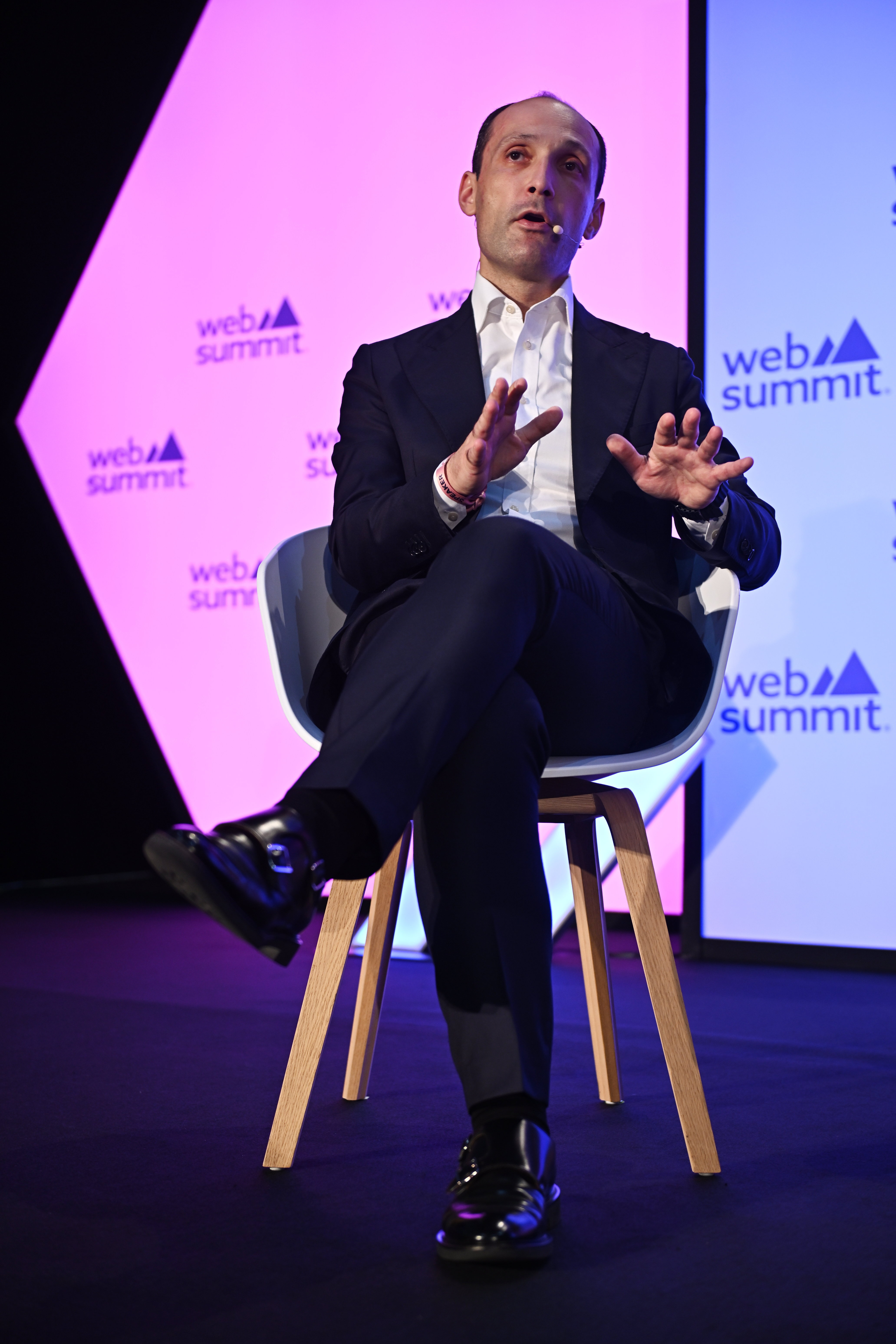
- Davitashvili in 2023

First Deputy Prime Minister of Georgia
- In office February 12, 2024 – June 24, 2025
- President: Salome Zourabichvili; Mikheil Kavelashvili
- Prime Minister: Irakli Kobakhidze
- Preceded by: Maia Tskitishvili (2021)

Deputy Prime Minister of Georgia
- In office July 12, 2021 – February 12, 2024
- President: Salome Zourabichvili
- Prime Minister: Irakli Garibashvili
- Preceded by: David Zalkaliani
- Succeeded by: Irakli Chikovani

Minister of Economy and Sustainable Development
- In office February 9, 2022 – June 24, 2025
- President: Salome Zourabichvili; Mikheil Kavelashvili
- Prime Minister: Irakli Garibashvili; Irakli Kobakhidze
- Preceded by: Natela Turnava
- Succeeded by: Mariam Kvrivishvili

Minister of Environmental Protection and Agriculture
- In office September 9, 2016 – February 9, 2022
- President: Giorgi Margvelashvili; Salome Zourabichvili
- Prime Minister: Giorgi Kvirikashvili; Mamuka Bakhtadze; Giorgi Gakharia; Irakli Garibashvili
- Preceded by: Otar Danelia
- Succeeded by: Otar Shamugia

Personal details
- Born: December 10, 1978 (age 47)
- Party: Georgian Dream
- Children: 2

Levan Davitashvili (Georgian: ლევან დავითაშვილი; born 10 December 1978) is a Georgian politician who was serving as the First Deputy Prime Minister of Georgia from July 2021 and Minister of Economy until June 2025. He previously served as the Minister of Environmental Protection and Agriculture from 2016 to 2022.

== Career ==
From September 2016 to February 2022, Davitashvili was Minister of Environmental Protection and Agriculture. On 9 February 2022, he became Minister of Economy and Sustainable Development. In July 2021 he was appointed as Vice Prime Minister of Georgia.

He was relieved of this position in June 2025.
