= Nodar Khaduri =

Georgian politician (1970–2019)

Minister of Finance
- In office 25 October 2012 – 26 November 2016
- President: Mikheil Saakashvili; Giorgi Margvelashvili
- Prime Minister: Bidzina Ivanishvili; Irakli Garibashvili; Giorgi Kvirikashvili
- Preceded by: Aleksandre Khetaguri
- Succeeded by: Dimitri Kumsishvili

Personal details
- Born: 29 August 1970 Tbilisi, Georgian SSR, Soviet Union (now Georgia)
- Died: 10 September 2019 (aged 49) Tbilisi, Georgia
- Party: Georgian Dream
- Education: Tbilisi State University

Nodar Khaduri (Georgian: ნოდარ ხადური; 29 August 1970 – 10 September 2019) was a Georgian academic and politician. He was Minister of Finance of Georgia from 25 October 2012 until 26 November 2016.

== Biography ==
Born in Tbilisi, Khaduri graduated from the Tbilisi State University with a degree in macroeconomics in 1996. From 1996 to 2004, he served on various positions in Georgia's ministries of Economy and of Finance, including being Deputy Finance Minister and the ministry's parliamentary secretary (2003–2004). He then worked for the United Nations Development Programme as a national consultant from 2004 and 2008. Khaduri lectured in economics at the Tbilisi State University from 1999 until August 2012, when he accused the university's administration of dismissing him because of his affiliation with the newly established opposition Georgian Dream party led by the tycoon Bidzina Ivanishvili. In October 2012, with the Georgian Dream's victory in the parliamentary election, Khaduri was elected to the Parliament of Georgia, but he was later appointed Minister of Finance in the cabinet of Bidzina Ivanishvili. He retained this position in the succeeding cabinet of Irakli Garibashvili, Ivanishvili's choice as his successor, in November 2013.

Political offices
Preceded by Aleksandre Khetaguri	Minister of Finance; 2012–2016	Succeeded by Dimitri Kumsishvili
