= Minister of Economy and Sustainable Development of Georgia =

- საქართველოს ეკონომიკისა და მდგრადი განვითარების მინისტრი
- Greater coat of arms of Georgia

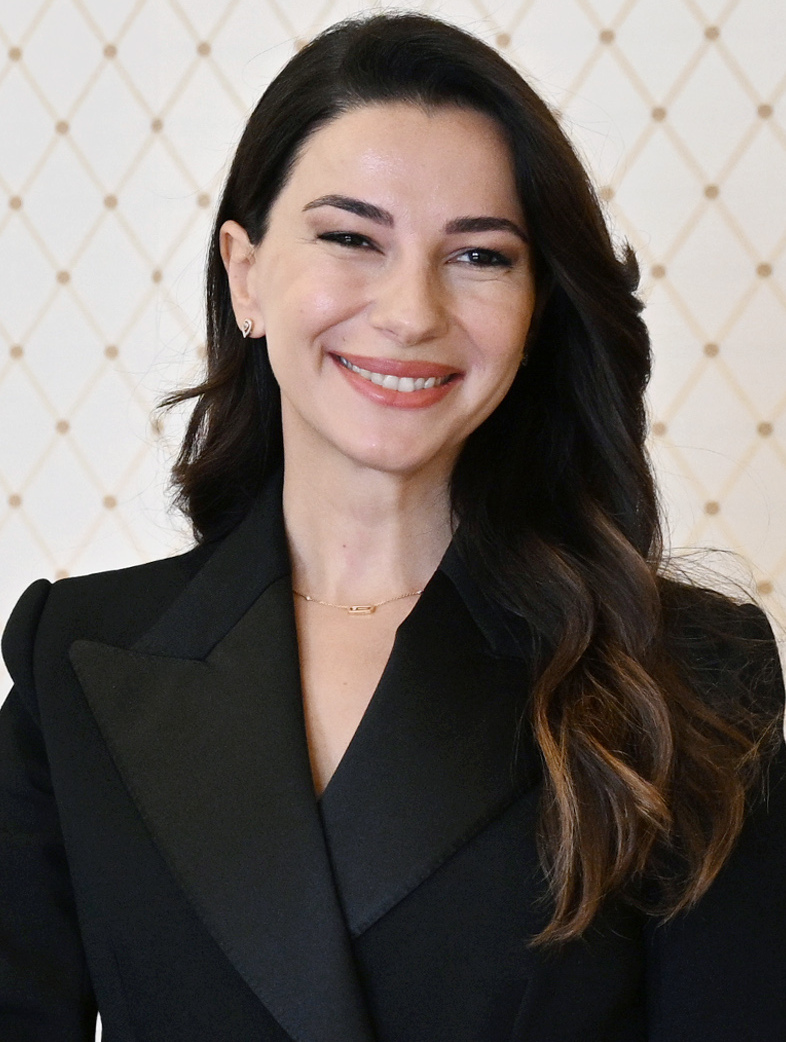
- Incumbent; Mariam Kvrivishvili since 24 June 2025
- Ministry of Economy and Sustainable Development
- Style: Mr. Minister (informal); The Honorable (formal)
- Member of: Cabinet
- Reports to: Prime Minister
- Seat: Tbilisi, Georgia
- Appointer: Prime Minister of Georgia
- Inaugural holder: Tamaz Gvelesiani (As Minister of Economy, Industry and Trade of the Republic of Georgia)
- Formation: January 14, 2004; 22 years ago (As Minister of Economy and Sustainable Development of Georgia)
- Salary: 11,050 GEL per month
- Website: economy.ge

The Minister of Economy and Sustainable Development of Georgia (Georgian: საქართველოს ეკონომიკისა და მდგრადი განვითარების მინისტრი, romanized: sakartvelos ek'onomik'isa da mdgradi ganvitarebis minist'ri) is the head of the Ministry of Economy and Sustainable Development, an agency in charge of regulating economic activities in the country. The position is equivalent to the minister of the economy in other countries, like the Permanent Secretary to the Treasury in the United Kingdom or Secretary of Commerce in the United States. The incumbent minister is Levan Davitashvili.

== Ministers ==
=== Peoples' Commissars of Trade of the Georgian SSR ===
- Sergo Donadze, May, 1938 – 13 November, 1941
- Nestor Giorgagdze, 13 November, 1941 – 3 May, 1945
- Severian Arobelidze, 3 May, 1945 – 25 January, 1949

=== Ministers of Trade of Georgian SSR ===
- Mikheil Narsia
- Vakhtang Tokhadze
- Mikheil Ghvinjilia, 1957
- Zinaida Kvachadze, 22 May, 1957 – 17 December, 1962
- Mamia Megrelishvili, 1962 – 1978
- Aleksandre Movsesian, 1978 – 3 November, 1988
- Vazha Jinjikhadze, 3 November, 1988 – 1990

=== Ministers of Economy, Industry and Trade of Republic of Georgia ===
- Tamaz Gvelesiani, 1990 – 1991
- Guram Absanadze, 1991 – 1992
- Mikheil Jibuti, 1992 – 1993
- Vladimir Papava (acting), 1993 – 1994
- Vladimir Papava, 1994 – 2000
- Ivane Chkhartishvili, 2000 – 2001
- Giorgi Gachechiladze, 2001 – 2003
- Irakli Rekhviashvili, November 2003 – June 2004

=== Minister of Economic Development of Georgia ===
- Kakha Bendukidze, June 2004 – December 2004
- Lekso Aleksishvili, December 2004 – June 2005
- Irakli Chogovadze, June 2005 – November 2006
- Irakli Okruashvili, November 2006
- Giorgi Arveladze, November 2006 – January 2008
- Eka Sharashidze, January 2008 – December 2008
- Lasha Zhvania, December 2008 – August 2009
- Zurab Pololikashvili, August 2009 – July 2010

=== Ministers of Economy and Sustainable Development of Georgia ===
- Vera Kobalia, July 2010–25 October 2012
- Giorgi Kvirikashvili, 25 October 2012 – 2015
- Dimitri Kumsishvili, 1 September 2015 – 2018
- Giorgi Kobulia, 1 September 2018 – 18 April 2019
- Natela Turnava, 18 April 2019 – 9 February 2022
- Levan Davitashvili, 9 February 2022 – 24 June 2025
- Mariam Kvrivishvili, 24 June 2025 – Present
