= Deputy Prime Minister of Georgia =

- ვიცე პრემიერი
- Coat of Arms of Georgia
- Incumbent; Irakli Chikovani, Mamuka Mdinaradze and Maka Botchorishvili since 8 February 2024 and 30 April 2026
- Cabinet of Georgia
- Style: Deputy Prime Minister (informal); His Excellency (diplomatic)
- Member of: Cabinet; National Security Council
- Reports to: The Prime Minister
- Seat: Tbilisi
- Appointer: Prime Minister
- First holder: Nika Gilauri

The Deputy Prime Minister of Georgia (Georgian: ვიცე პრემიერ მინისტრი, romanized: vitse p'remier minist'ri), Sometimes translated as Vice Prime Minister of Georgia, is an official position in the Georgian Cabinet. The office of the Deputy Prime Minister is not a permanent position, existing only at the discretion of the Prime Minister. The Prime Minister may assign to one of the ministers the duty of the First Deputy Prime Minister, and to one or more other ministers the duty of the Deputy-Prime Minister. The First Deputy Prime Minister shall perform the duty of the Prime Minister in his/her absence and in other cases provided for by law, as well as in respect of certain individual assignments. The Deputy Prime Minister(s) shall coordinate the exercise of executive power in the field of public management as established by an order of the Prime Minister.

== Current deputy prime ministers ==
Mamuka Mdinaradze	Irakli Chikovani	Maka Botchorishvili
Deputy Prime Minister State Minister for Law Enforcement Coordination	Deputy Prime Minister Minister of Defence	Deputy Prime Minister Minister of Foreign Affairs
Since 30 April 2026	Since 9 February 2024	Since 21 April 2026

== List ==
=== First Deputy Prime Ministers ===
Name	Start	End	Department
Nika Gilauri	December 2008	6 February 2009	Ministry of Finance
Irakli Alasania	25 October 2012	23 January 2013	Ministry of Defence
Giorgi Margvelashvili	23 January 2013	18 July 2013	Ministry of Education and Science
Giorgi Kvirikashvili	26 July 2013	30 December 2015	Ministry of Economy and Sustainable Development
Dimitri Kumsishvili	13 June 2016	13 June 2018	Ministry of Finance Ministry of Economy and Sustainable Development
Maya Tskitishvili	21 January 2021	18 February 2021	Ministry of Regional Development and Infrastructure
Levan Davitashvili	12 February 2024	Present	Ministry of Economy and Sustainable Development

=== Deputy Prime Minister ===
Name	Entered office	Left office	Portfolio	Cabinet
Aleksandre Jejelava	21 February 2017	13 November 2017		Giorgi Kvirikashvili
Giorgi Gakharia	13 November 2017	8 September 2019	Minister of Internal Affairs	Mamuka Bakhtadze
Thea Tsulukiani			Minister of Culture, Sports and Youth of Georgia	Irakli Garibashvili
Irakli Chikovani			Minister of Defence of Georgia	Irakli Garibashvili Irakli Kobakhidze
