= United Transport Administration of Georgia =

Transport agency of Georgia from 2005 to 2011

The United Transport Administration (Georgian: ერთიანი სატრანსპორტო ადმინისტრაცია, romanized: ertiani sat'ransp'ort'o administ'ratsia) was the transport agency of Georgia from 2005 to 2011, which united the management of road transport, civil aviation and maritime transport in the country. The agency was subordinated first to the Ministry of Economy and Sustainable Development and then to the Ministry of Regional Development and Infrastructure. The agency had its head office in Tbilisi.

In February 2011, the United Transport Administration was split into the agencies for Road Transport, Civil Aviation and Maritime Transport, each of which is a separate legal entity under the overall supervision of the Ministry of Economy and Sustainable Development.

== Divisions ==
Divisions included:

- Civil Aviation Department (სამოქალაქო ავიაციის დეპარტამენტი)
- Maritime Transport Department (საზღვაო ტრანსპორტის დეპარტამენტი)
- Road Transport Department (საავტომობილო ტრანსპორტის დეპარტამენტი)
