= COVID-19 pandemic in Georgia (country) =

Aspect of viral disease pandemic

- Disease: COVID-19
- Pathogen: SARS-CoV-2
- Location: Georgia
- First outbreak: Wuhan, Hubei, China
- Index case: Tbilisi
- Arrival date: 26 February 2020 (6 years, 7 months and 8 days)
- Confirmed cases: 1,864,337
- Recovered: 1,828,437 (updated 23 July 2023)
- Deaths: 17,151
- Fatality rate: 0.92%

Government website
- stopcov.ge

The COVID-19 pandemic was confirmed to have spread to Georgia when its first case was confirmed in Tbilisi on 26 February 2020.

== Timeline ==
All flights from China and Wuhan to Tbilisi International Airport were cancelled until 27 January. The Health Ministry announced that all arriving passengers from China would be screened. Georgia also temporarily shut down all flights to Iran.

On 26 February, Georgia confirmed its first COVID-19 case. A 50-year-old man, who returned to Georgia from Iran, was admitted to Infectious Diseases Hospital in Tbilisi. He came back to the Georgian border via Azerbaijan by taxi.

On 28 February, Georgia confirmed that a 31-year-old Georgian woman who had travelled to Italy tested positive and was admitted to Infectious Diseases Hospital in Tbilisi.

An additional 29 are being kept in isolation in a Tbilisi hospital, with Georgia's Center for Disease control chief, Amiran Gamkrelidze stating there was a "high probability" that some of them have the virus.

On 5 March, five people have tested positive for the new coronavirus COVID-19 in Georgia increasing the total number of people infected in the country to nine. Head of the Georgian National Centre for Disease Control Amiran Gamkrelidze made the announcement at the recent news briefing following today. He said, all of the five people belong to the same cluster who travelled together to Italy and returned to Georgia on Sunday.

On 12 March, President Salome Zourabichvili, in a televised appearance called for calm and unity.

As of 15 March, 33 cases were confirmed, 637 were held under quarantine and 54 were under hospital supervision.

On 16 March, the spokesperson of the Government of Georgia Irakli Chikovani announced special measures and recommendations. The government of Georgia banned entrance to Georgia for any foreign nationals for the next two weeks. The Coordination Council recommended all elderly citizens of Georgia to avoid mass gatherings and isolate themselves. The Government also recommends cafes, restaurants and bars to offer customers the take-away service. 33 cases of coronavirus were confirmed in Georgia, 637 persons remain in quarantine and 54 persons are under direct medical supervision in hospitals for 16 March. The government disseminated a special SMS to all phones in Georgia informing population about measures and recommendations.

On 7 May, Prime Minister Giorgi Gakharia announced that Georgia will open its borders to foreign citizens on 1 July. This move was later postponed until August. The state of emergency continued until 23 May.

=== Prelude ===
- 22 January: Amiran Gamkrelidze, head of the Georgian National Centre for Disease Control, warns Georgian travellers from visiting Wuhan, the point of origin of the COVID-19 outbreak. He claims that there is a "small, but theoretical" chance that the virus could reach Georgia.
- 26 January: Georgian doctors start examining passengers arriving from China at airports for coronavirus-related symptoms.
- 27 January:
  - Georgian news outlet Alia claims that some medics refuse to check airport arrivals out of a lack of proper safety guarantees. The Ministry of Health denies these allegations.
  - The National Center for Disease Control starts monitoring Chinese workers operating on the construction of a highway in Georgia.
- 28 January:
  - Georgia announces it will be evacuating its citizens from the Hubei Province of China.
  - Georgia bans the import of live animals, including turtles and ornamental fish, from China. Tbilisi claims the ban will remain in effect until the WHO declares China free from the coronavirus.
- 29 January:
  - Georgia suspends direct flights with China for two months.
  - Two Chinese sailors stationed in Batumi and showing signs of high fever start being monitored by the NCDC.
- 30 January: Prime Minister Giorgi Gakharia alleges that the country's healthcare system is ready to respond to the new coronavirus if it enters Georgia.
- 31 January: Two Chinese and two Georgian citizens, one of whom recently returned from Wuhan, are monitored by the NCDC after showing high temperatures. Their blood samples are sent to Germany after their test results come back negative for all the viruses that Georgia is capable at the moment of testing for.
- 1 February: The Georgian Foreign Ministry "stands with" China as the outbreak continues to expand and thanks Turkey for offering to evacuate Georgian citizens from Wuhan.
- 2 February: Turkey and France evacuate 5 Georgian citizens from the Hubei Province of China, initial centre of the COVID-19 pandemic.
- 4 February: The Lugar Centre of the NCDC starts testing for the coronavirus after receiving reagents from Germany. It previously had to send test samples to Germany or the Netherlands for confirmation.
- 10 February: United Airports of Georgia reports a 3% year-on-year decrease in airport traffic in January. Media cites the suspension of flights to China as a potential cause.
- 20 February: A South Korean citizen with high fever tests negative for the coronavirus in Georgia.
- 22 February: 34 Georgian citizens recently evacuated from China test negative for the coronavirus while in quarantine in Imereti.
- 23 February: Georgia calls the outbreak of the coronavirus in neighbouring Iran a "serious concern" and suspends direct flights with the Islamic Republic.
- 24 February:
  - Georgia warns its citizens visiting Italy, in particular northern parts of the country, to avoid public places and regularly wash their hands as Italy becomes the newest centre of the epidemic.
  - The NCDC assesses that the country remains a "low-risk" zone for the spread of the virus.
- 25 February: Three Georgians and two Iranians are tested for the coronavirus in Tbilisi. Their results come back negative.

=== First cases ===
- 26 February:
  - A Georgian citizen returning from Iran is diagnosed with the coronavirus at the Georgia-Azerbaijan border, representing the first COVID-19 case. President Salome Zourabichvili and the Health Ministry state there is no need for panic.
  - Prime Minister Giorgi Gakharia sets up an Inter-Agency Council for Coordination Against the Coronavirus (IACC), made up of representatives of every major government agency, to manage the situation. The IACC's first decision is to ban flights to Iran.
  - The Economy Ministry predicts a loss of 30 million lari per month in the tourism industry due to the coronavirus.
- 27 February:
  - The IACC instructs every Ministry to draft an action plan against the coronavirus.
  - Turkish citizens who visited coronavirus-infected countries are banned from crossing the Georgian-Turkish border.
  - 15 individuals with lung disease are taken to the town of Abastumani to be tested.
  - South Ossetian de facto authorities close down the Kartsmani crossing point in Imereti to prevent Georgians from entering the breakaway republic out of fear for the outbreak.
  - Airline Wizz Air reduces its flight frequency to Italian destinations, including a full cancellation of flights to Milan.
- 28 February:
  - A second case of COVID-19 is detected in a woman who recently travelled to Italy.
  - Russia sends out mobile sanitary brigades to help separatist Abkhazia deal with the virus, as Sokhumi refuses to collaborate with Tbilisi on the outbreak.
- 29 February:
  - A third case is diagnosed in a patient who had come in close contact with the first patient and had recently travelled to Iran.
  - The government closes schools down until 16 March.

=== 2021 ===
- 8 July:
  - Romania announced that will begin to deliver for free 100,620 million COVID-19 vaccines to several countries to help tackle the pandemic. The donation for Georgia consists of 10,000 doses.

== Statistics ==
=== Confirmed new cases per day ===
View source data.

=== Confirmed deaths per day ===
View source data.
