= Mariam Kvrivishvili =

Georgian politician (born 1990)

- მარიამ ქვრივიშვილი
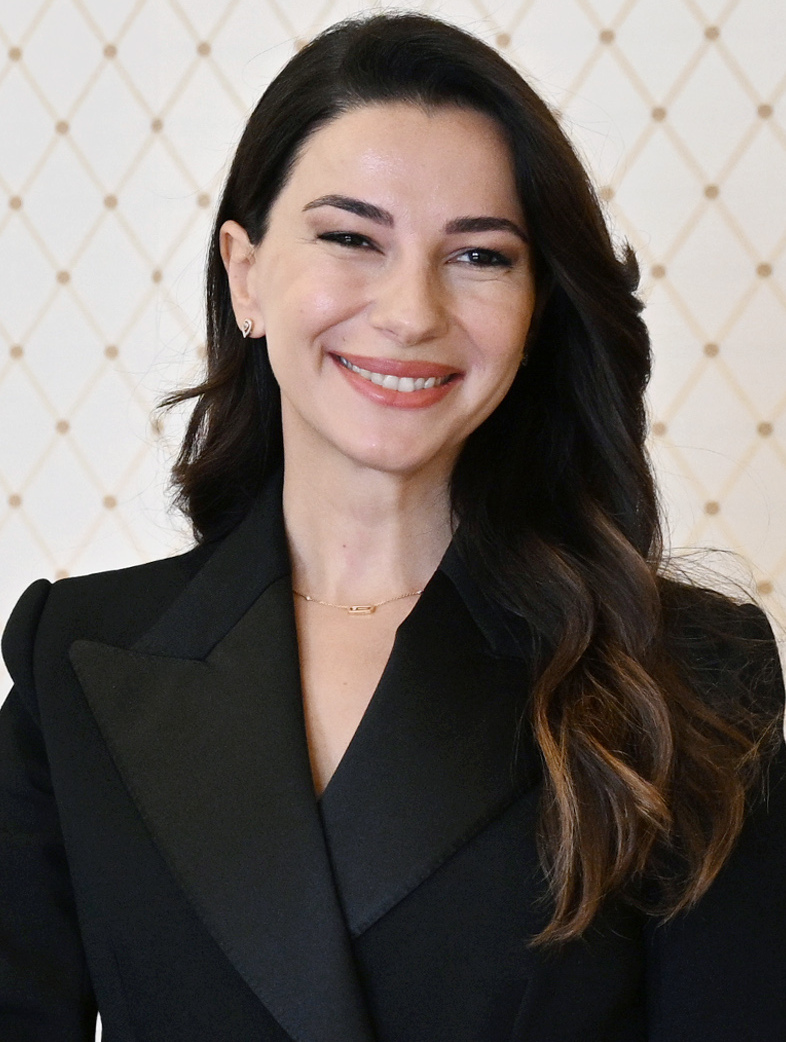
- Mariam Kvrivishvili in July 2025

Minister of Economy and Sustainable Development of Georgia
- Incumbent
- Assumed office 24 June 2025
- President: Mikheil Kavelashvili
- Prime Minister: Irakli Kobakhidze
- Preceded by: Levan Davitashvili

Deputy Minister of Economy and Sustainable Development of Georgia
- In office 30 November 2024 – 24 June 2025

Deputy Minister of Economy and Sustainable Development of Georgia
- In office May 2021 – September 2024

Member of the Parliament of Georgia
- In office 11 December 2020 – 25 May 2021
- In office 25 November 2024 – 10 December 2024

Personal details
- Born: June 11, 1990 (age 36) Tbilisi
- Party: Georgian Dream

Mariam Kvrivishvili (born 11 June 1990 in Tbilisi) is a Georgian politician and Minister of Economy and Sustainable Development of Georgia since 2025.

== Biography ==
Mariam Kvrivishvili was born on 11 June 1990 in Tbilisi. She graduated from the International Black Sea University (IBSU) in Tbilisi with a Bachelor’s degree in Business Administration.

In 2010–2012, she served as Deputy Head of Human Resources Management at the hospitality company Adjara Group. From 2012 to 2014, she held the position of Deputy Head of the Georgian National Tourism Administration (GNTA). In 2014–2019, she was the regional manager for the airline Flydubai in Georgia. In 2019–2020, she served as Head of the Georgian National Tourism Administration.

On 11 December 2020, Kvrivishvili became a member of the 10th convocation of the Parliament of Georgia through the party list of the syncretic Georgian Dream (fiscally left-wing, socially right-wing), serving until May 2021. In May 2021–September 2024, she served as Deputy Minister of Economy and Sustainable Development of Georgia.

In the November 2024 parliamentary elections, Kvrivishvili was listed on the party list of Georgian Dream.

From 30 November 2024 to 24 June 2025, she served again as Deputy Minister of Economy and Sustainable Development of Georgia.

Since 24 June 2025, she has served as Minister of Economy and Sustainable Development of Georgia.
