= Lasha Zhvania =

Georgian politician, diplomat, businessman, and activist

- ლაშა ჟვანია
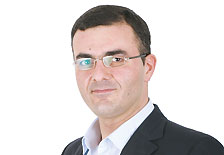

Ambassador of Georgia to Israel
- Incumbent
- Assumed office 1 August 2019

Head of the Presidential Administration of Georgia
- In office 17 December 2018 – 1 May 2019
- President: Salome Zourabichvili
- Preceded by: Giorgi Abashishvili
- Succeeded by: Natia Sulava

Minister of Economic Development
- In office 9 December 2008 – 21 August 2009
- President: Mikheil Saakashvili
- Prime Minister: Grigol Mgaloblishvili; Nika Gilauri
- Preceded by: Eka Sharashidze
- Succeeded by: Zurab Pololikashvili

Chairman of the Foreign Affairs Committee of the Parliament of Georgia
- In office 14 June 2008 – 9 December 2008=
- Preceded by: Konstantine Gabashvili
- Succeeded by: Zurab Pololikashvili

Member of the Parliament of Georgia
- In office 7 June 2008 – 16 December 2008
- Preceded by: Besarion Jugheli
- Succeeded by: Vacant (Andro Avalidze)
- Parliamentary group: United National Movement
- Constituency: Chughureti

Ambassador of Georgia to Israel and Cyprus
- In office 15 March 2005 – June 2008
- President: Mikheil Saakashvili
- Preceded by: Revaz Gachechiladze
- Succeeded by: Vakhtang Jaoshvili

Personal details
- Born: 14 October 1973 (age 53) Tbilisi, Georgian SSR, Soviet Union
- Party: Independent
- Education: Tbilisi State University
- Profession: Diplomat

Lasha Zhvania (Georgian: ლაშა ჟვანია; born on 14 October 1973 in Tbilisi, Georgia) is a Georgian politician, diplomat, businessman, and social activist who has also served as Head of the Presidential Administration of Georgia for the country's fifth president, Salome Zourabichvili.

A diplomat by education, he began an international affairs career by working in Georgia's Ministry of Foreign Affairs, notably by serving as the country's Ambassador to Israel and Cyprus. He would eventually join the political field, becoming a member of the Georgian Parliament, and the Minister of Economic Development for a short period of time after the August 2008 war against Russia.

A social activist, he is also known for having served as general manager of Georgian Patriarch Ilia II's International Humanitarian Foundation.

== Biography ==
=== Early life and career ===
Lasha Zhvania was born to a Jewish mother and Christian father in Tbilisi, on 14 October 1973. Educated at the Tbilisi Public School N.1, he would study International Law and International Relations at the Ivane Javakhishvili State University until 1995, before conducting a PhD study on International Humanitarian and Refugee Law at the same university until 1998. He would also attend courses in 1995 and 1998 at Leeds University and Birmingham University in the United Kingdom.

As a student, he interned in the Ministry of Foreign Affairs, before being appointed as the Third Secretary of the Ministry's Political Department in 1995 at just 22 years old. His career would give him higher positions within the MFA, eventually working in its Division for Africa, Australia, and Pacific Rim States, its Department for CIS States, and its Division for Multilateral Relations.

In 1998, he was appointed as the consul for the Embassy of Georgia to the State of Israel, a position he would keep until his 2002 appointment as Deputy Minister of Finance. He would also serve during that time as a member of the Anti-Corruption Council of Georgia, when the Western-backed political opposition overthrew the government of Eduard Shevardnadze in what came to be known as the Rose Revolution.

The new government, led by young president Mikheil Saakashvili, led a complete overhaul of the central bureaucracy. During the reforms, Zhvania was appointed in 2004 as Deputy Minister of Foreign Affairs under the leadership of Salome Zourabichvili, the former French ambassador to Georgia named as Minister of Foreign Affairs by Saakashvili.

=== Tenure as ambassador ===
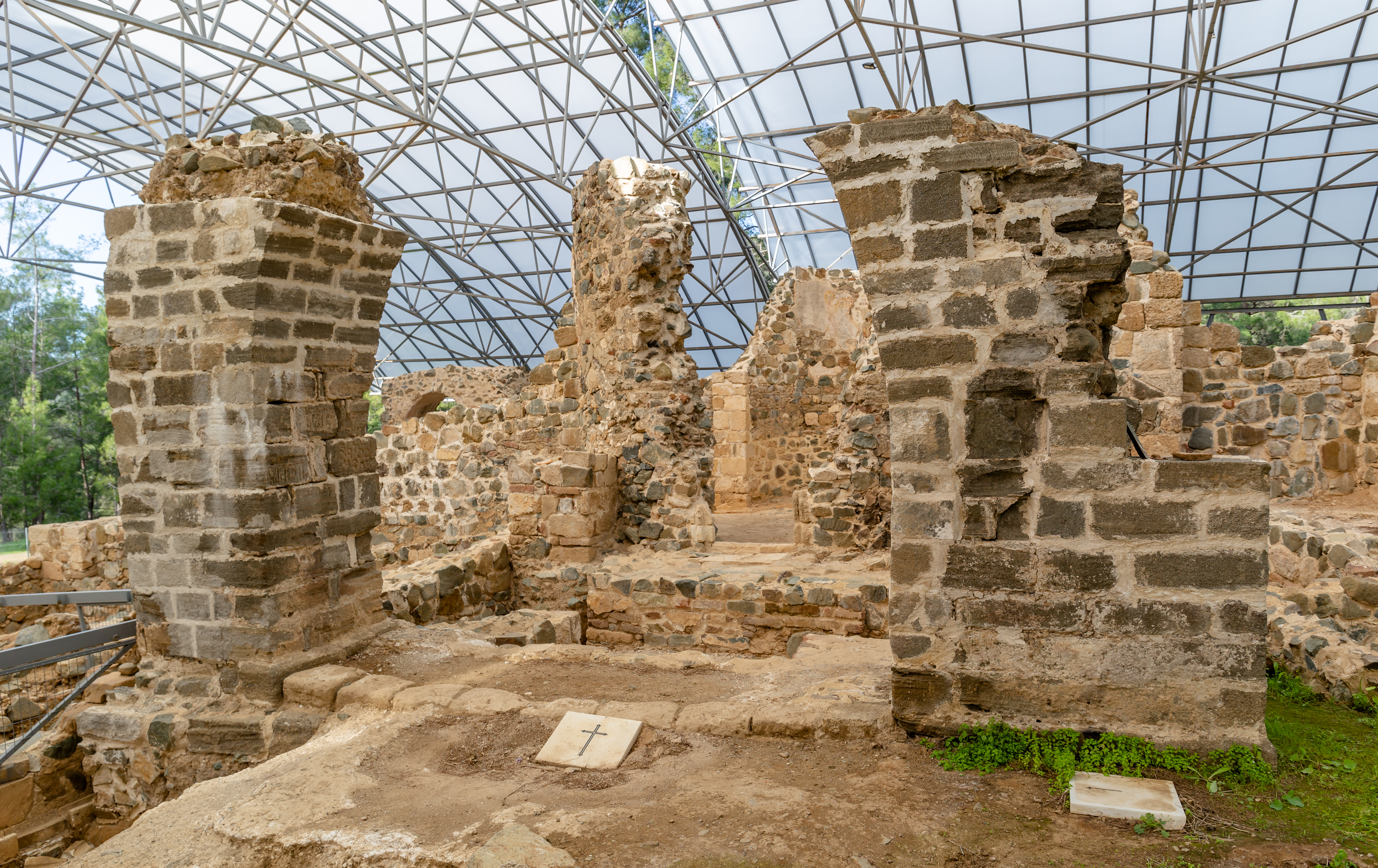
Ruins of the Georgian Gialia Monastery began to be excavated during Zhvania's tenure as Ambassador to Cyprus

On 10 August 2004, following President Saakashvili's appointment, Zhvania is confirmed by the Parliament as Ambassador Extraordinary and Plenipotentiary of Georgia to the State of Israel, based out of Tel-Aviv. He takes his functions on 15 March 2005, become Georgia's second Ambassador to Israel since the establishment of bilateral relations in 1992. On 29 September, he is also accredited to represent Georgia in Cyprus, becoming Georgia's first Ambassador to the Republic of Cyprus since the establishment of bilateral relations in 1993.

As Ambassador, Zhvania oversaw the inclusion of Israel into a visa liberalization plan passed by Parliament in April 2005. The plan allowed for a visa-free travel regime for all Israeli citizens coming to Georgia, in order to attract more tourists and businesses. He also helped planning highly publicized visits of Georgian officials to Israel, including that of Foreign Affairs Minister Gela Bezhuashvili in October 2007 and President Saakashvili in November 2006 and May 2008. He also managed over a serious increase in economic relations between Georgia and Israel, notably by more than doubling the trade balance between both countries in his first year in office.

As Ambassador to Cyprus, Lasha Zhvania notably facilitated the 2006 beginning of archaeological excavations of the Gialia Monastery, a 10th-century Georgian establishment.

=== In Parliament ===
While Ambassador, Lasha Zhvania announced his candidacy for the Chughureti district of the Parliament of Georgia, a district representing nearly 55,000 voters in central Tbilisi. While registered independent, his candidacy was part of the ruling party's "United National Movement – For a Victorious Georgia" electoral block, which swooped in 119 out of the 150 parliamentary seats of Georgia. Following his 21 May victory, he was one of the members of Parliament to endorse Davit Bakradze as Speaker, before being selected on 14 June as Chairman of the Parliament's Foreign Affairs Committee.

His term coincided with a severe and rapid degradation in the Georgia-Russia relations, a degradation that would ultimately lead to August 2008 Russo-Georgian war, a conflict that resulted in the deaths of hundreds, the displacement of more than 200,000 civilians, and the loss of several territories to Abkhaz and South Ossetian separatists. As early as 19 June, Zhvania complained about Russia's violation of its peacekeeping agreement in the Tskhinvali region, arguing that "[t]he [Russian peacekeeping] mandate was violated, because Russian peacekeepers were transporting ammunition and they had to inform the Georgian authorities in advance about it."

Zhvania was one of the co-authors of the major parliamentary resolution passed on 28 August 2008, declaring Abkhazia and South Ossetia to be "occupied territories" and asking the government to formally cut ties with Russia while annulling previous Russian peacekeeping agreements, a move that was initially opposed by President Saakashvili.

As a member of Parliament, Zhvania also served as chairman of the Friendship Group with the People's Republic of China and as a member of the parliamentary delegations to PACE and the OSCE.

=== Minister of Economy ===
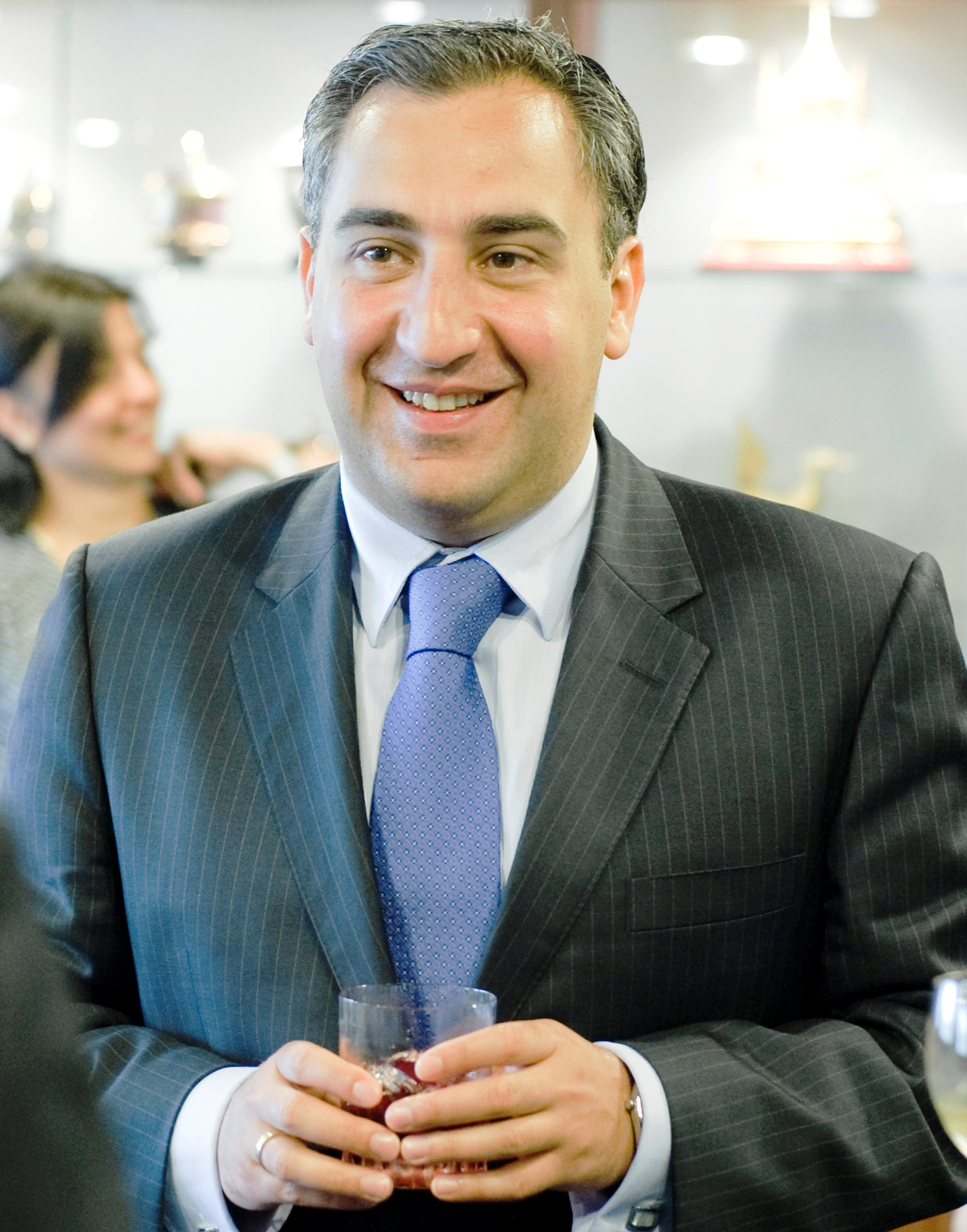
PM Gilauri came into public conflict with Zhvania over philosophical differences

On 9 December 2008, the new prime minister, Grigol Mgaloblishvili, announced the formation of a new cabinet. Zhvania, due to his successful work attracting Israeli investments into Georgia during his tenure as Ambassador, was selected as the new Minister of Economic Development. Soon confirmed, he takes on a ministry that had been in charge of the massive privatization efforts of the Saakashvili government. Within a few weeks, he signed a major deal with Azerbaijani company SOCAR, allowing it to purchase 22 small Georgian companies providing gas to Georgia's rural regions, in exchange of a $40 million investment into regional gas distribution infrastructures.

As minister, he also sponsored a major re-branding program of the country at-large following reports that tourism had fallen by up to 80% following the August 2008 War.

Disagreements with other members of the government arose soon after the beginning of his mandate. In March 2009, he came at odds with Foreign Affairs Minister Grigol Vashadze, following the latter's announcement that Georgian economy would grow by at least 2.5% during the first half of 2009, a claim denied by Zhvania, would stated that the post-war economy meant a mere 1% growth in the same period. This regime, however, did not prevent him from scoring a major investment deal with Egyptian company Fresh Electric, a home appliances manufacturing group seeking to create a free industrial zone in Kutaisi and planning a $3.3 billion investment in western Georgia.

The new prime minister, Nika Gilauri, soon came in conflict with Zhvania. Notably, the two disagreed over the importance of speeding up a free trade agreement with the European Union, with Zhvania claiming that the prime minister's office tried to slow down the negotiations of the agreement. Gilauri, moreover, hired as his economic aide Vakhtang Lezhava, a former Deputy Minister of the Economy sacked by Zhvania. At the core of the disagreement was the European Union's requirements to establish a stricter regulatory regime in Georgia, a move at odds with President Saakashvili's economically libertarian policies. Another libertarian concept resulting in the disagreement between Zhvania and Gilauri was privatization, with Gilauri criticizing the slow pace of privatizations during Zhvania's tenure, despite surpassing official government targets.

An Imedi TV whistleblower would eventually reveal that a series of negative reports about Lasha Zhvania was ordered by television leadership, at the time controlled by close allies to Mikheil Saakashvili.

On 21 August 2009, Nika Gilauri sacked Lasha Zhvania as Economy Minister, after the latter called him a "weak Prime Minister". However, the latter announced that he would remain a support of President Saakashvili, while the president called him a "friend".

=== Private sector ===
Having left the government, Lasha Zhvania launched a private career, creating his own consultancy company, Global Uni Group.

In 2010, he became the general manager of the International Foundation for Science, Culture and Spirituality of the Patriarch of All-Georgia, a non-profit organization created on behalf of Patriarch Ilia II.

=== 2018: Return to public sector ===
On 17 December 2018, Lasha Zhvania was appointed by the newly inaugurated president Salome Zourabichvili as the head of the Presidential Administration, in charge of managing the day-to-day operations of the presidential staff. As such, he has overseen the transition of the administration from the Avlabari Presidential Palace to the new Orbeliani Presidential Palace, a more modest and cost-effective, but more historical, building, as promised by President Zourabichvili during her election campaign. His deputies include former MP Ketevan Makharashvili and Natia Sulava, who also advises the president on diaspora issues.

As head of the administration, Zhvania has held several meetings with foreign ambassadors, while accompanying President Zourabichvili in international visits, including to Brussels, Afghanistan, (Germany), and Azerbaijan.

After supervising the massive reorganization of the presidential Administration linked to the transition process of the new president, Lasha Zhvania resigned from his position on 1 May 2019. On 1 August 2019, he was appointed by President Zourabichvili as Georgia's ambassador to Israel, returning to the country he left in 2008.

== Private life ==
In addition to his native Georgian, he speaks English, Hebrew, and Russian.

He was married to Tea Kiknavelidze and they have three children – Anna, Sulkhan-Irineos and Elene.
