= Giorgi Kobulia =

Georgian politician

Minister of Economy and Sustainable Development of Georgia
- In office 14 July 2018 – 18 April 2019
- Prime Minister: Mamuka Bakhtadze
- Preceded by: Giorgi Cherkezishvili
- Succeeded by: Natela Turnava

Personal details
- Born: 3 January 1970 (age 56) Tbilisi, Georgian SSR
- Party: independent
- Education: Tbilisi State Medical University; Emory University

Giorgi Kobulia (Georgian: გიორგი ქობულია; born 3 January 1970) is a Georgian politician who was Minister of Economy and Sustainable Development in the Government of Georgia from July 2018 to April 2019.

He is a graduate of Tbilisi State Medical University and Emory University (MBA, 2001).
