= Giorgi Gakharia =

14th Prime Minister of Georgia (country)

- გიორგი გახარია
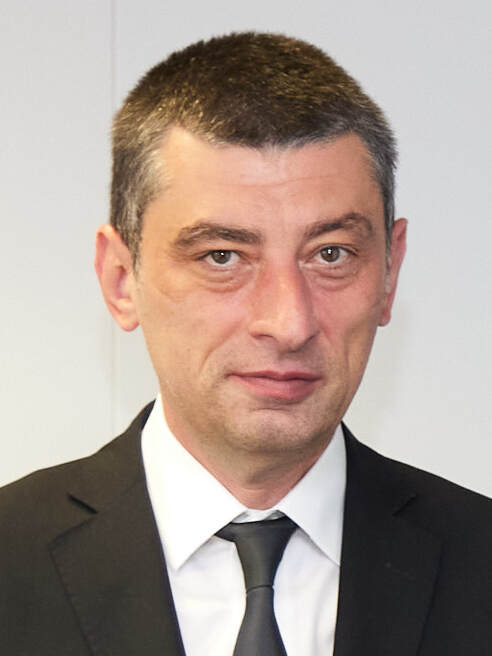
- Gakharia in 2021

Chairman of For Georgia
- Incumbent
- Assumed office 29 May 2021
- Preceded by: party established

14th Prime Minister of Georgia
- In office 8 September 2019 – 18 February 2021
- President: Salome Zourabichvili
- Preceded by: Mamuka Bakhtadze
- Succeeded by: Maya Tskitishvili (acting)

Deputy Prime Minister of Georgia
- In office 13 November 2017 – 8 September 2019
- President: Giorgi Margvelashvili; Salome Zourabichvili
- Prime Minister: Giorgi Kvirikashvili; Mamuka Bakhtadze
- Preceded by: Aleksandre Jejelava
- Succeeded by: Thea Tsulukiani

Minister of Internal Affairs
- In office 13 November 2017 – 8 September 2019
- President: Giorgi Margvelashvili; Salome Zourabichvili
- Prime Minister: Giorgi Kvirikashvili; Mamuka Bakhtadze
- Preceded by: Giorgi Mgebrishvili
- Succeeded by: Vakhtang Gomelauri

Minister of Economy and Sustainable Development
- In office 27 November 2016 – 13 November 2017
- President: Giorgi Margvelashvili
- Prime Minister: Giorgi Kvirikashvili
- Preceded by: Dimitri Kumsishvili
- Succeeded by: Dimitri Kumsishvili

Secretary of the National Security Council
- In office 1 May 2019 – 3 September 2019
- President: Salome Zourabichvili
- Prime Minister: Mamuka Bakhtadze
- Preceded by: David Rakviashvili
- Succeeded by: Levan Izoria

Secretary of the Economic Council
- In office December 2014 – September 2016
- Prime Minister: Irakli Gharibashvili; Giorgi Kvirikashvili

Business Ombudsman of Georgia
- In office March 2013 – July 2016

Personal details
- Born: 19 March 1975 (age 51) Tbilisi, Georgian SSR, USSR
- Party: For Georgia (2021–present); Georgian Dream (2013–2021)
- Spouse: Marika Pantsulaia
- Children: Ana Gakharia
- Parents: Zaur Gakharia (father); Mzia Lezhava (mother)

Giorgi Gakharia (Georgian: გიორგი გახარია; born 19 March 1975) is a Georgian politician who served as the 14th Prime Minister of Georgia from 8 September 2019 until his resignation on 18 February 2021.

== Education ==
During 1992–1994, Gakharia studied at Tbilisi State University faculty of history. During 1994–1999, he studied at Moscow State University. He has a master's degree in political science. In 2002–2004, he studied at Moscow State University's Higher Business School, receiving a master's in business management. In 2006–2009, he was an invited lecturer in Applied Biotechnology at Moscow State University.

== Business activity ==
From May 2004 to November 2008, Gakharia held the position of the Director-General of SFK Group; from November 2008 to February 2013 he held the position of the Director of Germany GR & Business Development at the Lufthansa Service Holding AG. (LSG, Frankfurt am Main) in Eastern Europe, CIS countries and Russian Federation.

== Ministry of Internal Affairs ==
In November 2017 the Government of Georgia was reshuffled, including the leadership of the Ministry of Internal Affairs; consequently, on 13 November 2017 Giorgi Gakharia was appointed to the post of the Minister of Internal Affairs, replacing Giorgi Mgebrishvili.

=== Infantry Patrol ===
Several months after the appointment, for ensuring the security for tourists and tourist areas the Infantry Patrol Subunit was created within the Patrol Police Department of the Ministry. Infantry patrol officers have received 3-week special retraining courses at the Academy of the Ministry of Internal Affairs; all of them know one or more foreign languages. They are provided with modern police equipment, including the latest generation of shoulder cameras.

== 2019 Georgian protests ==
On 20 June 2019, Parliament of Georgia hosted the Interparliamentary Assembly on Orthodoxy, an organization set up by the Greek parliament to unite Orthodox Christian lawmakers worldwide. With both Russia and Georgia being members of the organization, the Russian delegation arrived to take part in the session in the Georgian parliament. The session was opened with a speech in Russian from Sergei Gavrilov, a Russian lawmaker from the Communist Party of the Russian Federation, whilst sitting in the chair of the Head of Parliament. The event provoked protests from a large part of the Georgian population, especially young Georgians.

A large rally was held in front of the parliament on the evening of 20 June demanding the resignation of the speaker of the parliament Irakli Kobakhidze and the Georgian Dream government, causing clashes.

== Candidate for the prime minister ==
Prime Minister Mamuka Bakhtadze resigned on 2 September 2019, and the country was waiting for the appointment of a new prime minister. On the same day, the opinion was expressed that Minister of Internal Affairs and Vice Prime Minister Giorgi Gakharia was considered a candidate for the post of prime minister. Indeed, on 3 September, Bidzina Ivanishvili, chairman of the Georgian Dream party, nominated him as a candidate for prime minister.

Gakharia arrived in parliament on 8 September to respond to questions and gain support. The Georgian Dream party endorsed him, and he received approval with 98 votes on that same day.

== Prime minister ==
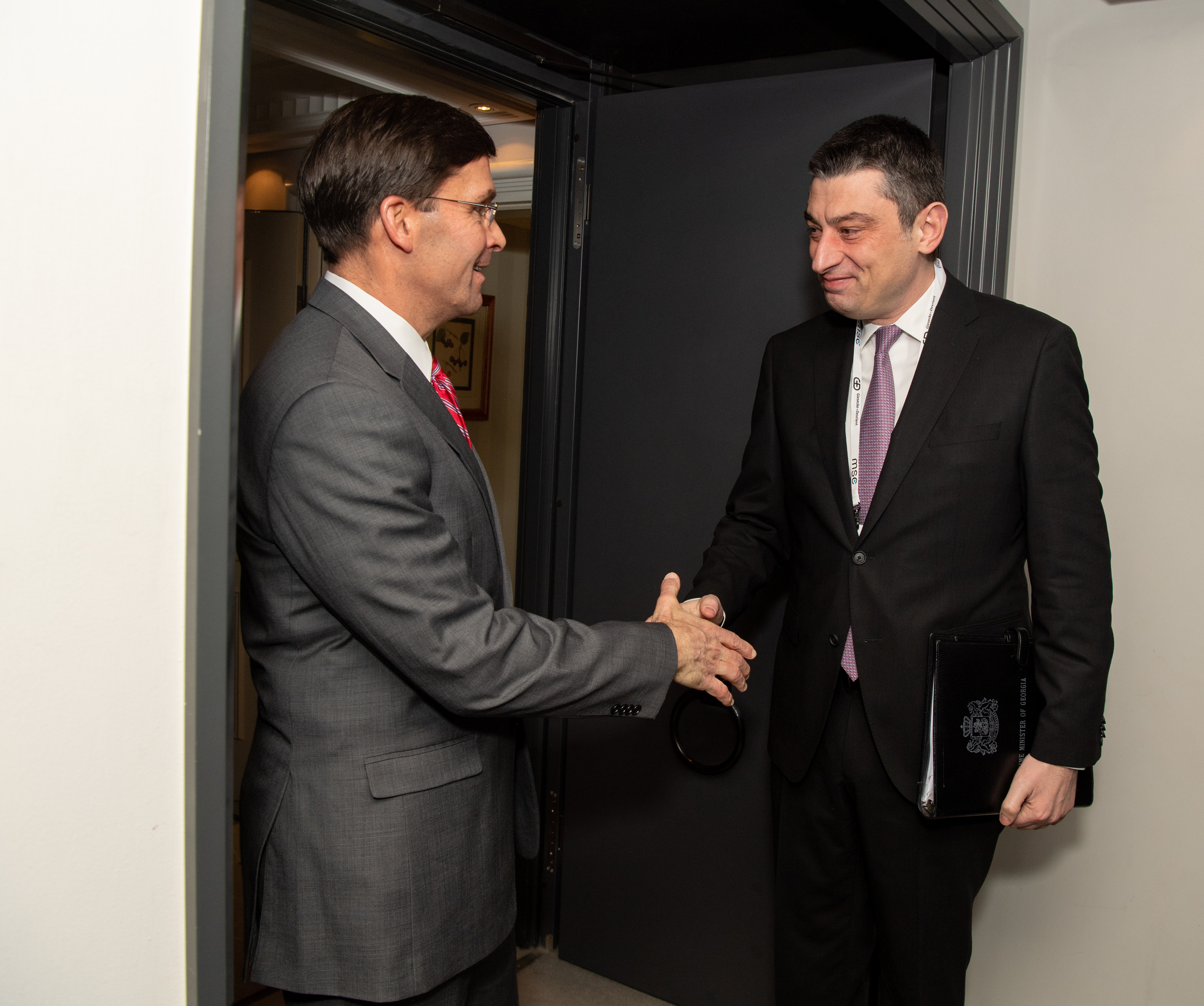
Gakharia meeting with the United States Secretary of Defense, Mark Esper, during the 2020 Munich Security Conference.

On 2 November 2020, during the COVID-19 pandemic in Georgia, Gakharia tested positive for the virus.

=== Resignation ===
Gakharia's resigned suddenly on 18 February 2021, saying that he no longer agreed with the positions of Georgian Dream. The situation in the country at the time: Nika Melia, chairman of the United National Movement party, was accused of organizing mass violence during the anti-government protests in 2019. When Melia declined to pay a $12,000 bail, a Georgian court ruled that Melia should be detained before his trial. In response, Melia said the court's ruling was "unlawful", and on 18 February, Gakharia resigned over the decision to detain Melia. Melia was arrested while at United National Movement party headquarters on 23 February. The ruling Georgian Dream party supported Irakli Garibashvili to replace Gakharia, and the Parliament voted 89–2 to appoint him on 22 February.

== Post-premiership ==
Gakharia later became head of the political party For Georgia. In January 2025, he suffered a fractured nasal bone and a concussion after being attacked at a hotel in Batumi, which his party blamed on Georgian Dream and its leader Bidzina Ivanishvili.

In mid-2025, Gakharia left Georgia for Germany and was granted a residence permit there. In November 2025, Gakharia was charged in absentia over his actions as a minister of internal affairs: the excessive use of force against protesters during Gavrilov's Night and exceeding his official powers in the Chorchana-Tsnelisi case.

== Electoral history ==
Election	Affiliation	First round			Second round		
Election	Affiliation	Votes	Percentage	Position	Votes	Percentage	Position
2020 Georgian parliamentary election	Georgian Dream (Note: Gakharia was a nominee for Prime Minister and head of the electoral list)	928,004	48.22%	1st			
2021 Tbilisi mayoral elections	For Georgia	45,257	9.41%	3rd			

Political offices
Preceded by Dimitri Kumsishvili	Ministry of Economy and Sustainable Development; 2016–2017	Succeeded by Dimitri Kumsishvili
Preceded by Mamuka Bakhtadze	Prime Minister of Georgia; 2019–2021	Succeeded by Irakli Garibashvili
