= Ivane Chkhartishvili =

Georgian millionaire and politician

Ivane Chkhartishvili ვანო ჩხარტიშვილი
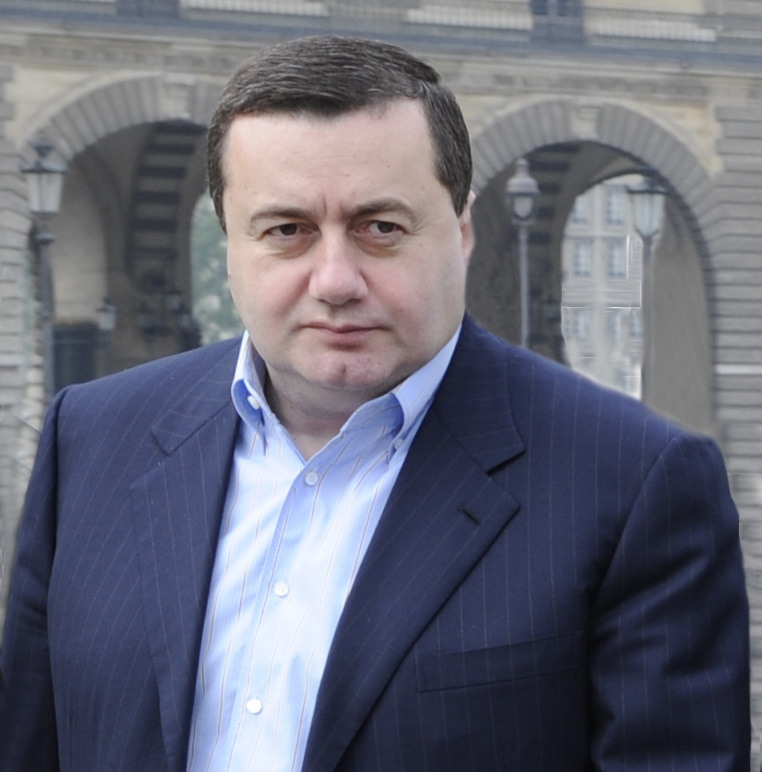

Deputy Minister of State
- In office 1999–2000
- President: Eduard Shevardnadze

Minister of Economy and Sustainable Development
- In office 2000–2001
- President: Eduard Shevardnadze
- Preceded by: Vladimer Papava
- Succeeded by: Giorgi Gachechiladze

Member of the Parliament of Georgia
- In office 2004–2008

Personal details
- Born: Ivane Chkhartishvili known as Vano ვანო ჩხარტიშვილი 30 January 1964 (age 62) Guria, Georgia
- Party: Independent
- Spouse: Nana Gotua
- Children: two (Mikheil and Natia)
- Education: Tbilisi State University
- Occupation: Businessman (Financial Services, Construction, Energy, Media), Founder of Media House Georgia, Owner of Mzera Television and TMN Investments, Former Politician
- Profession: Economist
- Net worth: US$100 million (2012)

Ivane (Vano) Chkhartishvili (Georgian: ვანო ჩხარტიშვილი) is a Georgian and is the 48th richest businessman in the region with an estimated wealth of around $100million. He is a former Minister of the Economy and Member of Parliament in Georgia.

He now resides in London, UK where he has a portfolio of businesses including independent media, energy, commercial and residential property interests.

== Early life and career ==
He was born in Guria in Georgia on 30 January 1964. In 1987 he graduated from Tbilisi State University and is a doctor of Economic Science. During his time as an undergraduate he spent eighteen months in the army undertaking national service.

He started his career with the City Council of Tbilisi as the director of the youth organisation, Union of the Young.

In 1995, Chkhartishvili was an accredited Specialist Economist consultant to the World Bank's research report by Patrick Conway on post-Soviet transition economies.

== Ministerial and Parliamentary career in Georgia ==
In 1999 Chkhartishvili was appointed the Deputy of State, a ministerial position he held for a year in which he played a key role in negotiating with the International Monetary Fund in meetings between September 1999 and January 2000 for ongoing support to reform the economy. He was part of the economic team to oversee the completion of the Baku–Tbilisi–Ceyhan pipeline contract, which was approved by the presidents of Georgia, Azerbaijan and Turkey in November 1999. Between 1999 and 2000, Chkhartishvili oversaw economic improvements with the high inflation rate of 19% reduced to 4.1% and the population living below the poverty line falling from 60% in 1999 to 54% in 2001. In April 2000, Chkhartishvili was part of the Georgian delegation that travelled to Moscow to successfully negotiate a resumption of gas supplies to Georgia after they had been cut by Itera, the Russian gas company.

Chkhartishvili was then appointed by President Eduard Shevardnadze as the Minister of the Economy, Industry and Trade (later renamed Ministry of Economy and Sustainable Development). In June 2001, Chkhartishvili brought to fruition a project to develop a joint Georgian-Italian leasing company to assist in nurturing small and medium enterprises in Georgia. Chkhartishvili secured an initial investment of $350,000 from BNL Bank of Italy and other Italian investors.

In September 2001, Chkhartishvili voiced concerns about corruption and urged an increase in the country's budget. He highlighted that the average Georgian businessman was paying 233 lari ($115) in bribes every month. Chkhartishvili was involved in a bitter dispute with the Minister of Justice, Mikheil Saakashvili, over the summer of 2001, which led to his opposition to Saakashvili's reign as president. As the internal tensions continued inside Government, Chkhartishvili left the Government to concentrate on his business affairs.

In June 2002, Chkhartishvili successfully sued officials who had made allegations of corruption against him. The Supreme Court of Georgia positively ruled in his favour to exonerate him of the allegations. He refused any financial compensation and accepted the apology.

From 2004 to 2008, he was a Member of the Georgian Parliament. Following the election, he was elected Chairman of the parliamentary caucus, the Independent Majoritarians.

In April 2004, he was part of the delegation led by Badri Patarkatsishvili that sought to defuse tensions in the Adjara region.

In June 2004, he was appointed as Deputy Representative for Georgia to the Council of Europe.

The Georgian Parliament in December 2004, after an investigation found the previous Government of Georgia responsible for the devaluation of deposits that affected some savers in the country and pointedly cleared Chkhartishvili of any responsibility.

In November 2006, Chkhartishvili was part of a high level delegation that met with a Polish parliamentary delegation in Tbilisi aimed at strengthening democratic governance.

Chkhartishvili backed the resolution in 2007 at the Council of Europe's Committee on Economic Affairs and Development to pursue 'a vision that combines economic growth and social protection in the new economic world' and a further resolution to improve support for prudent financial management to avoid the 'collapse' of the Council of Europe. In his final parliamentary year in 2008, he backed the Council of Europe's budget of 'additional resources allocated to the European Court of Human Rights'. Chkhartishvili also supported in the Council of Europe, the New Partnership for Africa's Development (NEPAD) goals 'to promote peace, security, democracy and good governance' in Africa.

== Business career ==
From 1995 to 2002 he was first the founder and later the chairman and shareholder of the United Georgian Bank (UGB). In 2003, Chkhartishvili, became the Founder of Mze TV and publicly complained about the apparent smear campaign against him made by the rival TV station Rustavi-2. Between 2006 and 2011, Chkhartishvili was a minority shareholder in SOCAR Energy Georgia supplying petroleum products from Azerbaijan to Georgia.

In 2011, he was the Founder of the financial investment company, TMN Investments, based in London.

In May and June 2012, a lawsuit was brought by representatives of the late Badri Patarkatsishvili against Chkhartishvili seeking to claim ownership of shares over the State Oil Company of Azerbaijan ('SOCAR'), and Petro-Trans FZCO ('Petro-Trans') that he had owned since 2006. The court emphatically found in favour of judgement of Chkhartishvili and dismissed the claims by stating The injunctions are discharged and will not be continued. There will be summary judgment for Vano on the claim.

In July 2012, Chkhartishvili announced he was suing figures in the Georgian Government for allegedly misappropriating the broadcast media company Mze TV from him in 2005.

Chkhartishvili is planning to launch an alternative media company, Mzera Television later in 2012.

== Personal ==
Vano is married to (Nana Gotua) and has two children, His son Mikheil Chkhartishvili studied at Regents College on Business and Management and is part of the TMN investments group) and Natia Chkhartishvili (Director of TMN Investments).

== Honors and awards ==
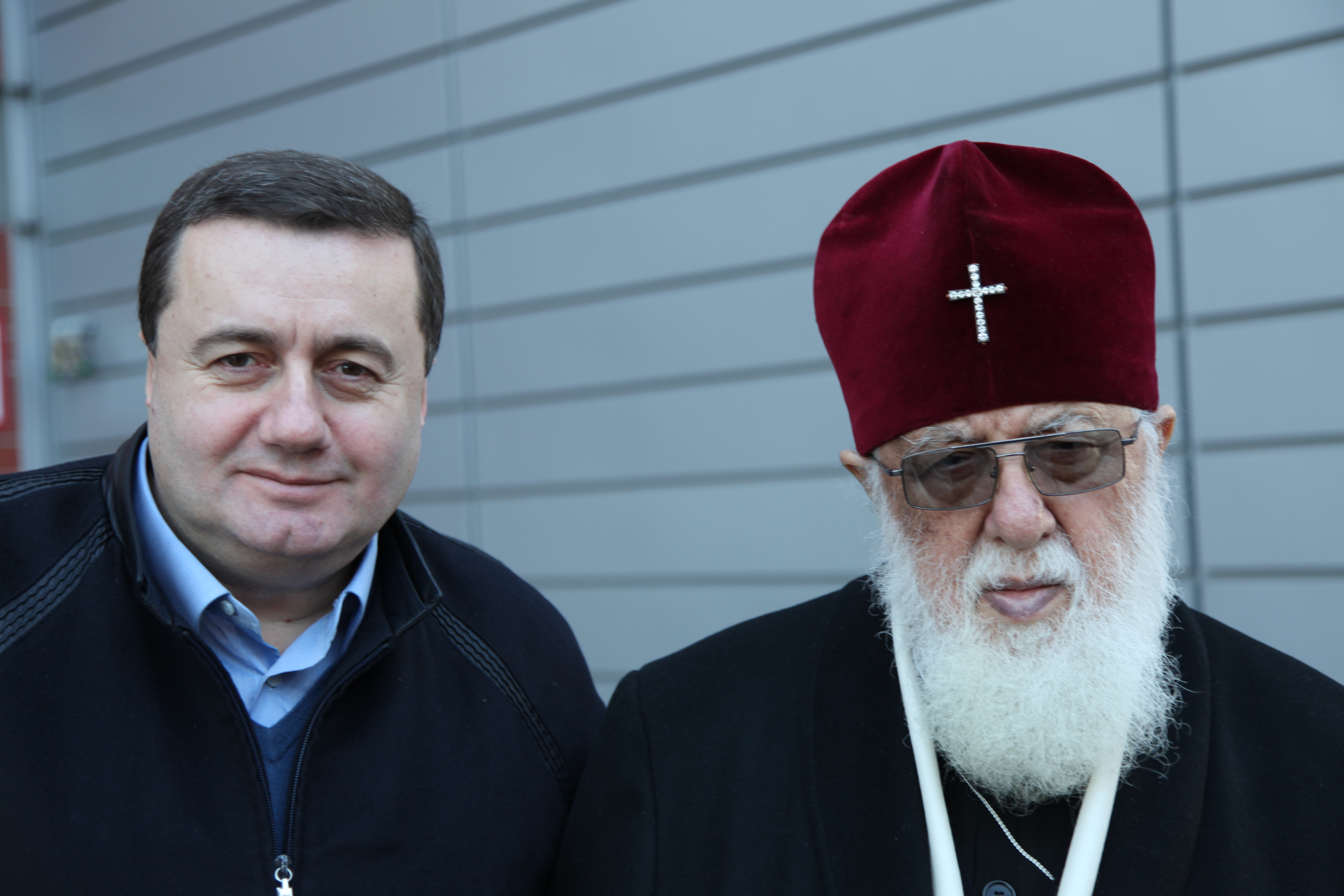
Ivane Chkhartishvili and Patriarch Ilia II of Georgia

Vano Chkhartishvili has been awarded for his contribution to the strengthening of Orthodoxy in Georgian emigration and support of the Georgian Church in England. This award is the highest order of the eparchy and was awarded to Chkhartishvili by the Archbishop of Great Britain and Ireland in 2012.
