= Irakli Chogovadze =

Georgian politician

- ირაკლი ჩოგოვაძე
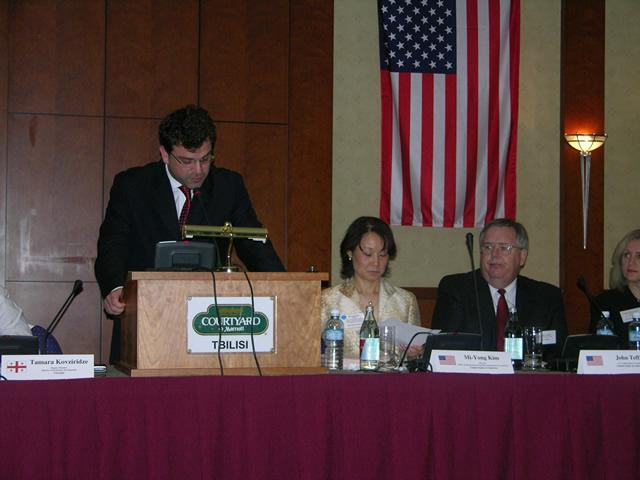
- Minister for Economic Development, Irakli Chogovadze, addresses Forum participants.

Minister of Economic Development of Georgia
- In office 30 June 2005 – 10 November 2006

Irakli Chogovadze (Georgian: ირაკლი ჩოგოვაძე; born August 19, 1973) is a Georgian banker and former Minister of Economic Development of Georgia in the period 2005-2006.

== Biography ==
Chogovadze was born in Tbilisi and studied at Tbilisi State University's faculty of finances and credits. He received a master degree in Management of Banking and Financial Organizations at the University of Paris. In 2000-2003 he worked for the European Bank for Reconstruction and Development (EBRD).

In 2004 Chogovadze moved back to Georgia and became deputy chairman of the Enterprise Management Agency of Georgia, an agency that guided the privatisation of state owned companies. He promoted in November of that year to its chairman. In June 2005 prime minister Zurab Nogaideli appointed him Minister of Economic Development of Georgia in the government of Mikhail Saakashvili.

In November 2006 Chogovadze resigned to become head of the Georgian Oil and Gas Corporation. He resigned from that job eight days later. Chogovadze later moved to Russia and Kazakhstan as director of the international operations of the Sberbank.
