= Vladimer Papava =

Georgian economist (born 1955)

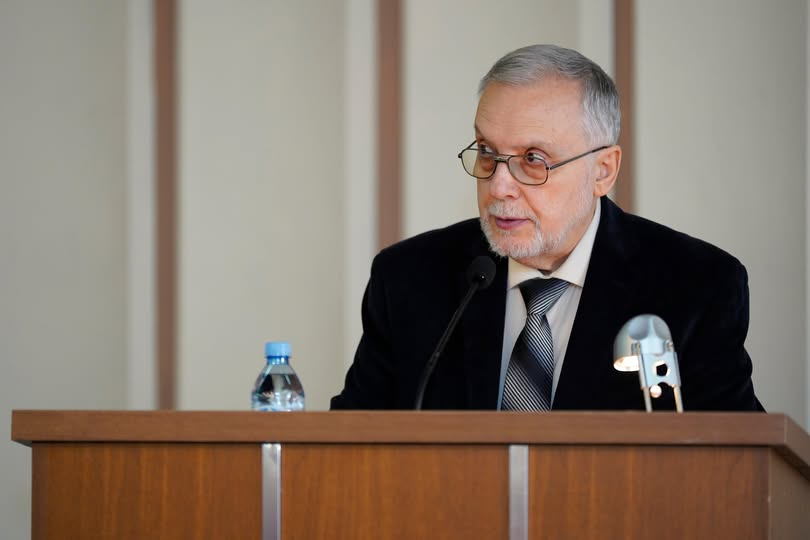
- Born: March 25, 1955 (age 71); Tbilisi, Georgia

Academic background
- Education: Ivane Javakhishvili Tbilisi State University

Academic work
- Discipline: Economics of Post-Communist Transformation, Economic Growth and Development
- Institutions: Academician-Secretary of the Georgian National Academy of Sciences 28th Rector, Ivane Javakhishvili Tbilisi State University (2013-2016); Minister of Economy, Republic of Georgia (1994-2000) at present Ministry of Economy and Sustainable Development (Georgia)
- Awards: Ivane Javakhishvili Medal (2022); Philippe Gogichaishvili Prize of the National Academy of Sciences of Georgia (2008); State Prize of Georgia in Science and Technology (2004)

Vladimer Papava (Georgian: ვლადიმერ პაპავა; born March 25, 1955) is an Academician-Secretary of the Georgian National Academy of Sciences, a professor of economics at the Ivane Javakhishvili Tbilisi State University, the former Rector of the Ivane Javakhishvili Tbilisi State University (August 16, 2013 – April 20, 2016), and the former Minister of Economy of Georgia (June 1994 – May 2000). He was elected a Fellow of the International Core Academy of Sciences and Humanities in 2024.

== Life and career ==
Born in Tbilisi, Georgia, Papava graduated Tbilisi State University (with a specialization in Economic Cybernetics) in 1977. He received his Candidate of Science degree in Economics (PhD) from the Central Economic Mathematical Institute of the Academy of Sciences of the USSR, Moscow, in 1982, and his Doctor of Science degree in economics from Tbilisi State University in 1989 and Leningrad State University in 1990. In 2005-2006 he was a visiting scholar at the Central Asia–Caucasus Institute at the Paul H. Nitze School of Advanced International Studies, Johns Hopkins University. He is the author of more than 400 publications. In 2013 He was elected on the position of the Rector of the main university of Georgia – Ivane Javakhishvili Tbilisi State University. He was made a Fellow of the Royal Economic Society in May 2025.

== Contributions to Economics ==
Papava is an author of the Semi-Productive Matrix Approach for Input-Output Models the Theory of the Economic Ability of the Government and Egalitarian Goods, the Model of an ‘Economy Without Taxes,’ the Theory of Laffer-Keynesian Synthesis, the Theory of the ‘Shadow Political Economy’ (with Nodar Khaduri), the Indexes of Tax Corruption, the Method of the ‘Social Promotion’ for Post-Communist Transition to Market Economy, the Doctrine of Market Equality and Its Application to the Process of Post- Communist Transformation, the Theory of ‘Necroeconomics – the Political Economy of Post-Communist Capitalism,’ measurement of catch-up effect in economic growth, and ‘Retroeconomics – the Theory of Moving from Dying to Brisk Economy.’

== Contributions to Geopolitics ==
Vladimer Papava (with Eldar Ismailov) elaborated the geopolitical Concept of the Central Caucasus. He also is an author of the geopolitical Concept of the Central Caucaso-Asia.

== Other Activities ==
Papava is a Member of the Editorial Boards of the Problems of Economic Transition (USA), Central Asia and the Caucasus (Sweden), Journal of World Economic Research (USA), European Journal of Economic Studies (Slovak Republic), Transformations (Poland), Economy of Ukraine (Ukraine), Society and Economy (Russia), Finance: Theory and Practice (Russia) and Bulletin of the Georgian National Academy of Sciences (Georgia). In 1992-2005 he was the Chief-Editor of the Proceedings of the Georgian Academy of Sciences – Economic Series.

From 1997 Papava has been a Corresponding Member of the Georgian National Academy of Sciences and an Active Member – Academician since 2013. He is an Active Member of the International Academy of Sciences, Education, Industry and Arts (CA, USA), an Active Member of the New York Academy of Sciences (NY, USA), an Active Member of the International Informatization Academy (UN), a Member of the International Research Institute for Economics and Management (Hong Kong; Denver, USA), an Eminent Fellow Member of the Scholars Academic and Scientific Society (India) and other international societies and associations. In 2008-2010 he was the Deputy Chairman of the Scientific Committee for Economics and Law of the Georgian National Academy of Sciences; from 2010 he has been the Chairman of the Scientific Committee for Economics of the Georgian National Academy of Sciences; in 2007-2010 he was a Member of the CASE (Center for Social and Economic Research) Advisory Council (Warsaw, Poland) and a Member of the International Scientific Council of the International Institute for Social Development (Moscow, Russia). He is also a member of the Tbilisi-based think-tank Rondeli Foundation – Georgian Foundation for Strategic and International Studies.

In 2008 Vladimer Papava was awarded the Philippe Gogichaishvili Prize of the National Academy of Sciences of Georgia for the book – Necroeconomics: The Political Economy of Post-Communist Capitalism. New York, iUniverse, 2005. In 2004 Vladimer Papava together with a group of Georgian economists was awarded the State Prize of Georgia in Science for the Series of Publications – ‘The Methods and Models of Macroeconomic Regulations.’
