= Irakli Garibashvili =

Prime Minister of Georgia (2013–2015, 2021–2024)

- ირაკლი ღარიბაშვილი
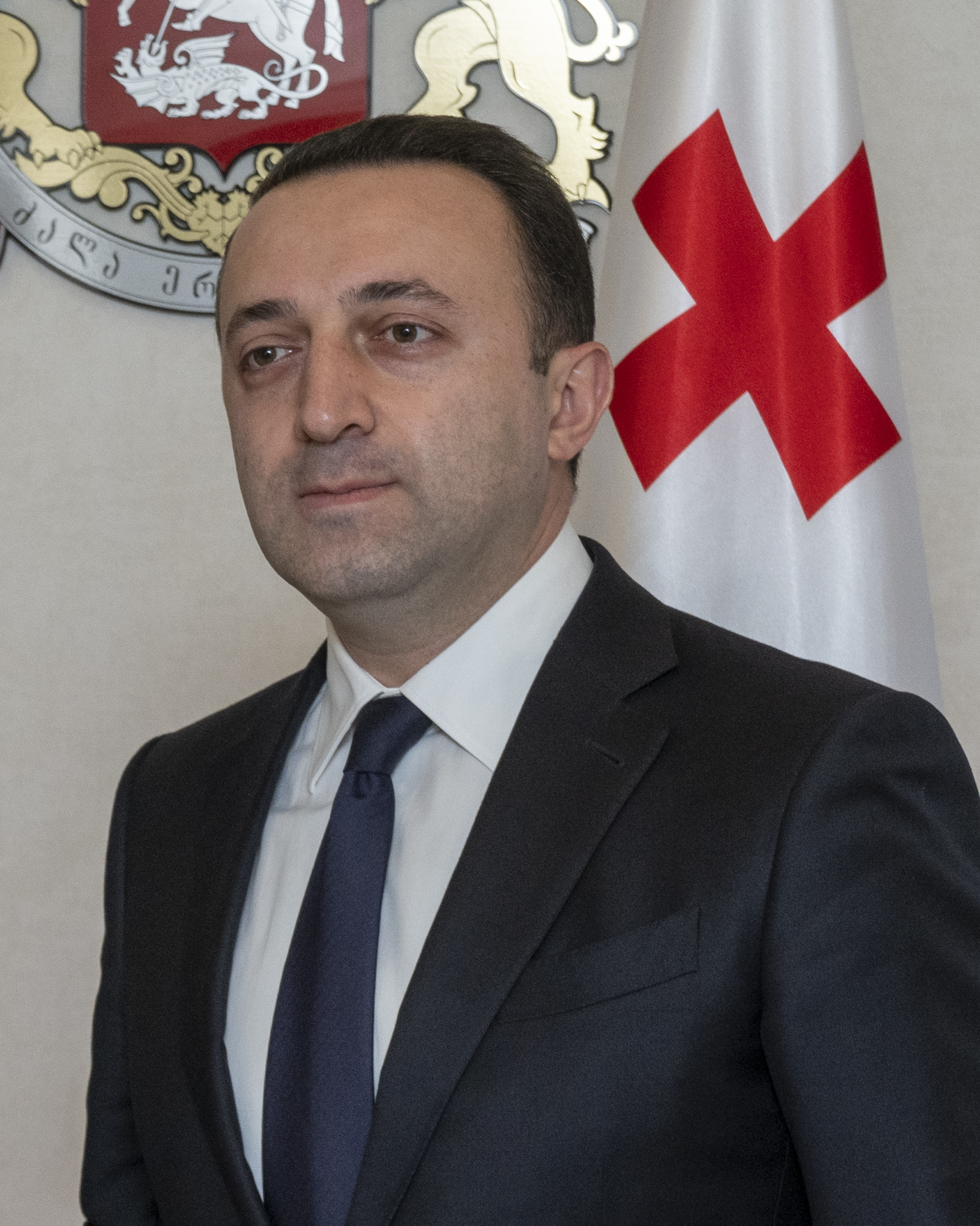
- Garibashvili in 2021

Prime Minister of Georgia
- In office 22 February 2021 – 8 February 2024
- President: Salome Zourabichvili
- Deputy: Thea Tsulukiani; Levan Davitashvili
- Preceded by: Maya Tskitishvili (acting)
- Succeeded by: Irakli Kobakhidze
- In office 20 November 2013 – 30 December 2015
- President: Giorgi Margvelashvili
- Deputy: Giorgi Kvirikashvili; Kakha Kaladze
- Preceded by: Bidzina Ivanishvili
- Succeeded by: Giorgi Kvirikashvili

Chairman of Georgian Dream
- In office 1 February 2024 – 25 April 2025
- Preceded by: Irakli Kobakhidze
- Succeeded by: Irakli Kobakhidze
- In office 15 November 2013 – 30 December 2015
- Preceded by: Bidzina Ivanishvili
- Succeeded by: Giorgi Kvirikashvili

Minister of Defence
- In office 8 September 2019 – 22 February 2021
- President: Salome Zourabichvili
- Prime Minister: Giorgi Gakharia
- Preceded by: Levan Izoria
- Succeeded by: Juansher Burchuladze

Minister of Internal Affairs
- In office 25 October 2012 – 17 November 2013
- President: Mikheil Saakashvili; Giorgi Margvelashvili
- Prime Minister: Bidzina Ivanishvili
- Preceded by: Ekaterine Zguladze (acting)
- Succeeded by: Aleksandre Chikaidze

Political Secretary of Georgian Dream
- In office 5 March 2019 – 1 February 2024
- Preceded by: Gia Volski
- Succeeded by: Irakli Kobakhidze

Member of the Parliament of Georgia
- In office 25 November 2024 – 10 December 2024
- In office 21 October 2012 – 7 November 2012

Personal details
- Born: 28 June 1982 (age 44) Tbilisi, Georgian SSR, Soviet Union
- Party: Independent (2015–2019, 2025–present)
- Other political affiliations: Georgian Dream (2012–2015, 2019–2025)
- Spouse: Nunuka Tamazashvili
- Children: 4
- Education: Tbilisi State University; Pantheon-Sorbonne University
- Website: Prime Minister's Personal Website

Irakli Garibashvili (Georgian: ირაკლი ღარიბაშვილი, also transliterated as Gharibashvili; born 28 June 1982) is a Georgian politician and former business executive who served as prime minister of Georgia from 20 November 2013 until his resignation on 30 December 2015, and then again between 2021 until his resignation in 2024. Garibashvili is a member of the Georgian Dream party and served as the party's chairman. He entered politics with his long-time associate Bidzina Ivanishvili, in October 2012.

He served as Defence Minister of Georgia in the cabinet of prime minister Giorgi Gakharia from 2019 to 2021 and, prior to that, as Minister of Internal Affairs in the cabinet of Bidzina Ivanishvili from 2012 to 2013. Ivanishvili named Garibashvili as his successor as prime minister when he voluntarily stepped down in November 2013. Aged 31 at his ascension, he was the youngest person to assume the prime ministerial office. During his first term, he was the second youngest state leader in the world, after Kim Jong Un.

== Early career ==
From 1988 to 1999 Garibashvili attended the secondary school No. 1 in Dedoplistsqaro. From 1999 to 2005 Garibashvili studied International Relations at Tbilisi State University (TSU), where he graduated with a master's degree. He also studied at the Pantheon-Sorbonne University from 2002 to 2004. Since 2004, he has worked with the multi-billionaire Bidzina Ivanishvili. He started by working for logistics division of the construction company Burji, owned by Ivanshvili's Cartu Group. He became Director General of Ivanishvili's charity foundation Cartu in 2005, a member of the supervisory board of Ivanishvili's Cartu Bank in 2007, and director of the label Georgian Dream founded by Ivanishvili's pop-star son Bera from 2009 to 2012.

== Early political career ==
Garibashvili became involved in the politics of Georgia when Ivanishvili founded his political party Georgian Dream–Democratic Georgia in February 2012. Garibashvili was one of the founding members and initially headed the party's revision committee. He was included in the party list of MP candidates for the October 2012 parliamentary election. After the coalition won the 2012 parliamentary election on 1 October, Irakli Garibashvili became a party-list representative of the Georgian Dream – Democratic Georgia party in the 2012 convocation of the Parliament of Georgia.

== Minister of Internal Affairs ==
After Georgian Dream's victory in the 2012 parliamentary election, Garibashvili was appointed as Minister of Internal Affairs in the cabinet of prime minister Ivanishvili on 25 October 2012. Garibashvili, then 30 years old, became the youngest member of Georgia's new government. Reforming the Interior Ministry, an agency overseeing Georgian police, security and intelligence services, as well as the border guard and navy, was a part of the Georgian Dream's pre-election agenda.

Georgian Dream also promised to "restore justice" during the election campaign and to prosecute officials of the previous government for human rights abuses committed while in office, especially after the Gldani prison scandal prior to the elections confirmed long-standing allegations of ill-treatment in the Georgian penitentiary system. Subsequently, from 2012 through 2013, the Interior Ministry arrested several high-ranking officials from the previous government, including the former ministers Bachana Akhalaia and Ivane Merabishvili.

During his tenure, Garibashvili announced that he would take steps to de-politicise the Ministry of Internal Affairs. As part of the reform, the Constitutional Security and Special Operative Departments were abolished. An ad hoc commission was set up to handle 24 000 illegal surveillance files found in the MIA. Those files, which contained compromising footage, were destroyed in presence of media and members of a commission in August 2013.

Garibashvili's agency faced the post-election spike in crime in Georgia after the newly elected government granted large-scale prison amnesty to reduce Georgia's high incarceration rate. Garibashvili opposed the amnesty project, but it was implemented by the parliament anyway.

Garibashvili defended the arrests of the former ministers as being in strict accordance with the law and justice and claimed that the rate of minor crime, albeit increased, was not alarming.

== First premiership (2013–2015) ==
On 2 November 2013, prime minister Bidzina Ivanishvili, who had declared his intention to quit the government following the October 2013 presidential election, named Garibashvili as his successor. He and his cabinet won in a vote of 93–19 in the Parliament of Georgia on 20 November 2013. Garibashvili thus occupied the most powerful political office in the country as the constitution amendments had transferred power from the president to the prime minister and the government. At heated parliamentary debates with the United National Movement minority during the vote, Garibashvili promised economic improvement and stressed that Georgia's EU and NATO aspiration would remain his foreign priorities.

On 24 November 2013, he was elected chairman of the Georgian Dream–Democratic Georgia party, succeeding Ivanishvili. Garibashvili announced his resignation on 23 December 2015. While no reason was given for the sudden move, it was reported that he may have done so due to low levels of support for the Georgian Dream among the populace, with it polling at 18% in November, and parliamentary elections scheduled for 2016. Opposition politicians, analysts and media speculated that falling support for the ruling Georgian Dream coalition, pressure from the previous prime minister Bidzina Ivanishvili, or tensions with the president Giorgi Margvelashvili were possible explanations for Garibashvili's resignation. Garibashvili was succeeded as prime minister by Giorgi Kvirikashvili, who had been his minister of foreign affairs, with the transfer of power taking effect on 29 December.

=== Government initiatives ===
During his tenure the Security and Crisis Management Council was established, as stipulated by the new Constitution of Georgia. In addition, the Unified Coordination Center for Crisis Management was created, with technical assistance from the US, the United Kingdom and Israel. To coordinate the country's economic policy, Irakli Garibashvili established the Economic Council.

=== Human rights ===
The Georgian Government initiated, and the European Union directly supported, the development of the Human Rights Strategy and Action Plan. A relevant statement was made by prime minister Garibashvili at the Human Rights Conference, on 4 December 2013. The Human Rights Strategy covers seven years and will not depend on the political cycle.

=== Foreign policy ===
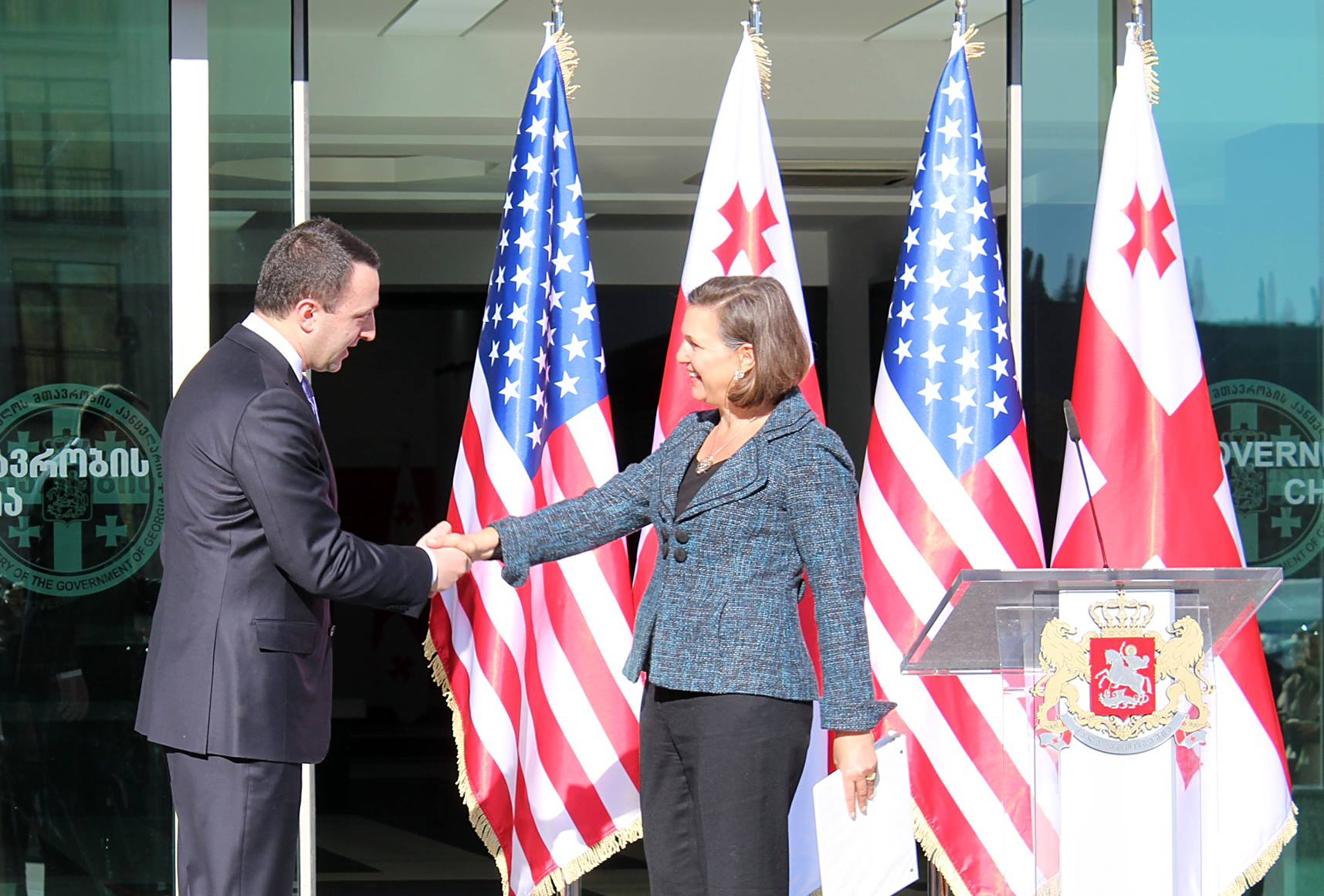
Prime Minister Irakli Garibashvili meets Victoria Nuland, U.S. Assistant Secretary of State for European and Eurasian Affairs, December 2013

During his tenure, Garibashvili visited the neighboring countries Armenia, Azerbaijan and Turkey, several European nations, the United States, Israel, the People's Republic of China, and participated in several international summits and forums. While relations to Russia improved, there were no state visits to and from Russia.

Relations to the European Union were a priority, culminating in the EU-Georgia Association Agreement, initiated at the Vilnius summit and signed on 27 June 2014. This association agreement included a deep and comprehensive free trade agreement between Georgia and the European Union and paved the way for the abolition of visa for travel from Georgia to the Schengen area, planned for 2017.

== Return to private sector ==
In February 2018, Garibashvili became the regional adviser to the board of the CEFC China Energy company.

== Second premiership (2021–2024) ==
=== Appointment ===
Nika Melia, chairman of the United National Movement party, was accused of organizing mass violence during the anti-government protests in 2019. When Melia declined to pay a $12,000 bail, a Georgian court ruled that Melia should be detained before his trial. In response, prime minister Giorgi Gakharia said the court's ruling was "unlawful", and on 18 February, Gakharia resigned over the decision to detain Melia. The ruling Georgian Dream party supported Garibashvili to replace Gakharia, and the Parliament voted 89–2 to appoint Garibashvili on 22 February. Melia was arrested while at United National Movement party headquarters on 23 February.

=== Domestic policy ===
==== Secret audio recordings ====
In March 2021, the opposition TV Pirveli media outlet released alleged secret audio recordings involving Irakli Gharibashvili, head of the special state protection service of Georgia Anzor Chubinidze and Bera Ivanishvili, son of Georgian billionaire and founder of ruling Georgian Dream party Bidzina Ivanishvili. According to conversations, Bera Ivanishvili, who was a school student at that time, was discussing with Irakli Gharibashvili tasking Anzor Chubinidze to humiliate and punish youngsters for online posts insulting him. Garibashvili is heard encouraging the retributions on the covertly recorded tapes. TV Pirveli placed the data of the recording in 2017. The Georgian Dream party released a statement that the conversation was fabricated and that audio recordings were illegally obtained by the United National Movement government (now opposition) during its rule in 2010–2011. Gharibashvili denied the existence of the recordings made public by TV Pirveli and called them fake. The Georgian Chief Prosecutor's Office announced that the recordings were faked.

==== Namakhvan HPP construction ====
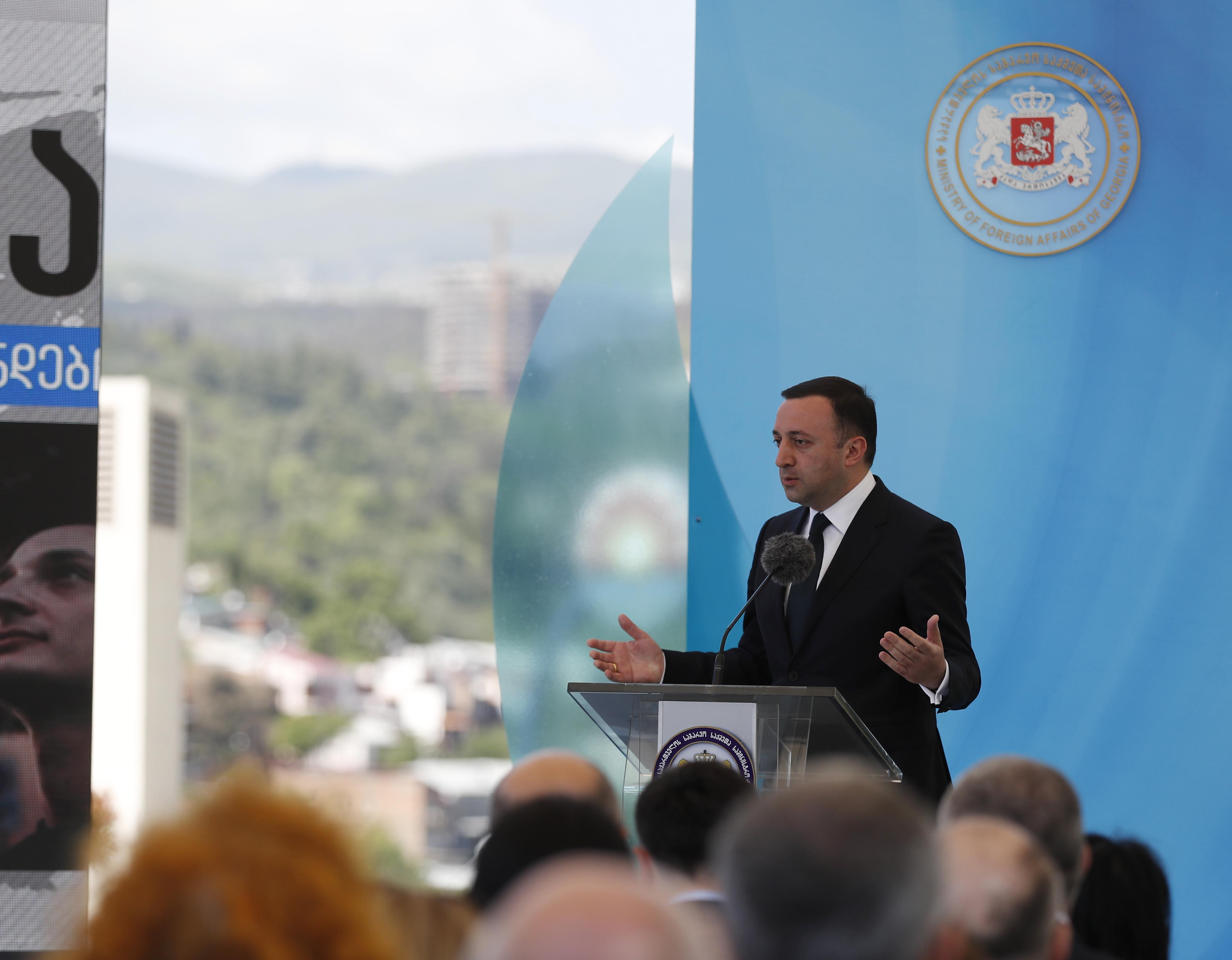
Prime Minister of Georgia Irakli Gharibashvili, May 2022

Gharibashvili terminated the construction of Namakhvan HPP, agreed by the previous government headed by Giorgi Gakharia. On 14 March, a large protest by the locals was held against construction of a power plant, including due to environmental concerns, at the central square of Kutaisi. At the end of March 2021, in accordance with the people's demand, Gharibashvili announced that he reached a compromise with the HPP construction company about the postponement of the deadline. In May 2021, a massive rally against the construction was held in Tbilisi. Garibashvili stated that the project would not continue under "current conditions" of the contract, which many activists described as "cabal" and "harming state interests". In March 2022, the private investor notified the government of Georgia that it had terminated the contract due to "violation of the terms of the contract and force majeure". Garibashvili stated that the state would build a plant on much favorable terms.

==== Anti-gay parade protests ====
On 5 July 2021, a first-ever gay parade was planned to be held on Tbilisi's main Rustaveli Avenue, organized by NGO Tbilisi Pride. An event was opposed by conservative and Christian organizations and activists. On 5 July, Prime Minister Irakli Garibashvili said that holding a parade on Rustaveli Avenue posed serious security risks and asked the organizers to either choose one of the alternative locations suggested by the MIA, or not to go forward with the plan at all, calling it unreasonable. Gharibashvili warned that it would provoke negative reactions from a large segment of the Georgian population. The event was eventually cancelled because the Rustaveli Avenue was occupied by anti-parade protesters, who ransacked pro-LGBT NGO offices and clashed with journalists who were covering the events. Garibashvili later stated that Georgia is a conservative society with Christian values and such events are unacceptable to 95% of the Georgian population, so as an elected official was obliged to obey them. Garibashvili additionally said that "the only parade I know, that will be held in our country, is that of our army" and proclaimed that "minorities will no longer decide the fate of the majority in this country". He blamed the "radical opposition" and the ex-president in exile, Mikheil Saakashvili, for being behind the pride parade in order to destabilize the country and cause chaos.

The tension between the government and the opposition parties was followed by the brutal beating of the TV Pirveli journalist Lexo Laksharava, who later died on 12 July. This was followed by a large-scale protest by journalists, representatives of several TV companies demanding Gharibashvili's resignation on 13 July, but the prime minister did not resign, he said that he would not allow the situation in the country to be strained and rioted.

==== Arrest of Mikheil Saakashvili ====
On 1 October 2021, the third president of Georgia, Mikheil Saakashvili, who left Georgia in 2013 and was condemned by the Tbilisi City Court to six years in prison in absentia for abuse of power, embezzlement, and his implication in the attempted murder of an opposition MP, announced that he had returned to Georgia after 8 years of persecution, and published a video that, according to his description, was taken in Batumi. The ruling party, "Georgian Dream" denied the information and stated that Saakashvili is in Ukraine and has not left the territory of Ukraine, but later Irakli Gharibashvili announced at a briefing together with the minister of internal affairs Vakhtang Gomelauri and the head of the State Security Service Grigol Liluashvili that Mikheil Saakashvili is under arrest. According to the investigation, Saakashvili entered the country secretly, hiding in a semi-trailer truck loaded with milk products. He illegally crossed the state border of Georgia, bypassing the customs control. Saakashvili stated that he considered charges against him to be trumped-up and politically motivated, announcing a hunger strike in order to protest his detention. His health deteriorated during his time in prison, due to which the government of Georgia received criticism from European Parliament, alleging ill-treatment of Saakashvili and violation of his rights. The government said that Saakashvili was trying to evade prison through self-harm and was using international lobbyists to pressure the government to release him on medical grounds.

==== Gambling regulations ====
In December 2021, the Parliament passed a new gambling law, which was initiated by the Garibashvili government. The law has tightened the regulations on gambling industry. It increased the age limit for gambling from 18 (for online gambling) and 21 (for casinos) to 25 and banned gambling for public employees, socially vulnerable persons or those included in the "addicts list". A list would be created by government and include everyone who voluntarily declares himself to be a gambling addicts or who will be declared as such by the court under the request of relatives. The law banned all kinds of advertisement (except sports sponsorship) and placed high fines for those companies which violate the rules about the age limit and advertisement. It also increased the taxes on the companies involved in the gambling sector.

Prime Minister Irakli Garibashvili described gambling addiction as "one of the biggest problems" of the population, describing problem as especially widespread among young and vulnerable people.

==== Proposed foreign agents law ====
On 7 March 2023, the Georgian parliament passed a foreign agents law in the first reading which would label any organization that has more than 20% of its profits be recorded from outside of Georgia as "agents of foreign influence." Garibashvili has been a leading figure in trying to get the bill passed stating that the bill meets "European and global standards". After parliament voted in favor of the bill, tens of thousands of protesters arrived at parliament to protest the bill, being met with riot police, tear gas, and water canons. On 9 March, the government announced that it would withdrew the bill due to protests and that all protesters who were arrested would be released from prison. On 10 March the bill was formally defeated in a second vote by the Parliament, while an alternative bill was retracted.

==== New surrogacy law ====
On 12 June 2023, Prime Minister Irakli Garibashvili announced that the government would draft a new surrogacy law which would ban commercial surrogacy. The law would also ban foreign nationals from ordering surrogacy services. Garibashvili said that the law was necessary to protect Georgian women from exploitation and to ensure child safety since foreigner nationals often took children abroad and sold them to same-sex couples.

==== Resignation ====
On 29 January 2024, Garibashvili announced his resignation, citing the importance of internal inter-party democracy and the need to "give others a chance." The announcement was made during a special briefing at the Government Administration, where Garibashvili confirmed his acceptance of an offer to become the chair of the Georgian Dream party. Expressing gratitude to various party members and government officials, including founder Bidzina Ivanishvili, Garibashvili acknowledged their support during his term as prime minister.

=== Foreign policy ===
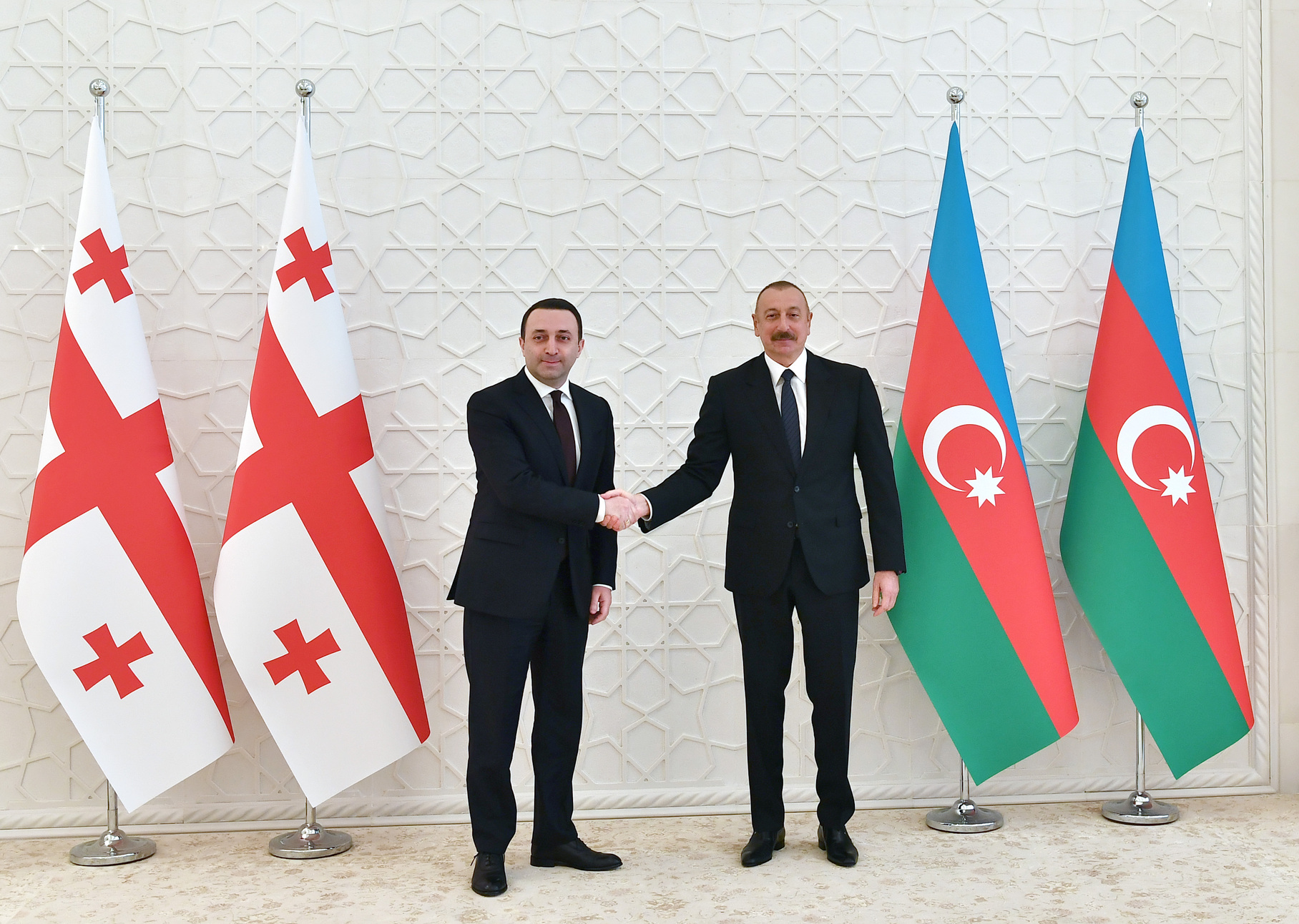
Garibashvili and Azerbaijani president Ilham Aliyev in Baku, 5 May 2021

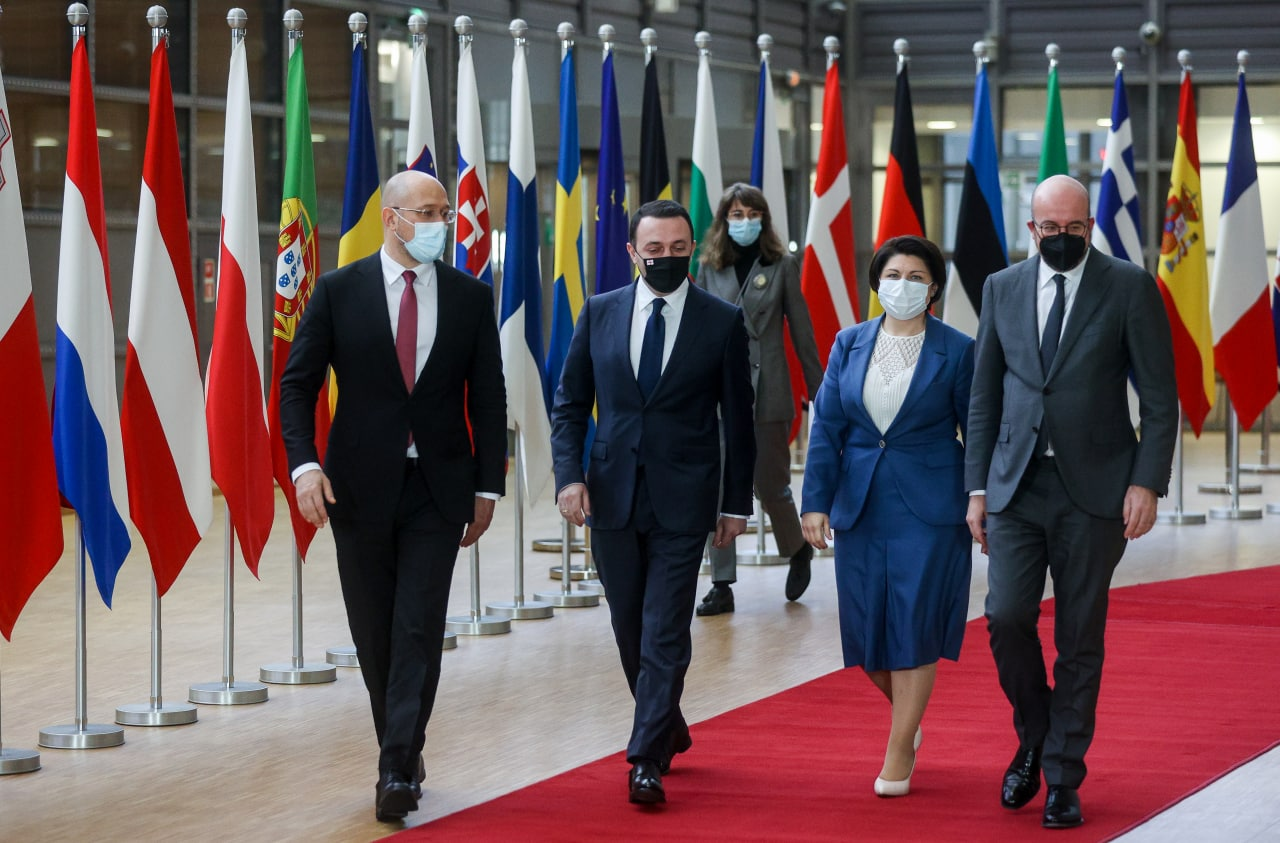
PM of Ukraine, Georgia and Moldova met with President of the European Council Charles Michel, November 2021

Garibashvili went on his first official visit to Brussels in March 2021, and met with the president of the European Parliament and other important political figures, before that Charles Michel visited Georgia on 1 March 2021. The prime minister thanked his European colleague for his support in many ways.

During his term, Garibashvili stated that his goal was to join Georgia to the European Union and bring peace to the country, that is why he visited many countries of the world and started bilateral relations with them, such as Kazakhstan, Saudi Arabia, the United Arab Emirates and China.

Garibashvili visited Ukraine from 21 to 23 August 2021, met with President Volodymyr Zelenskyy and talked with him about the deepening of relations between the countries, calling Ukraine a strategic partner.

In September 2021, Garibashvili arrived in New York and addressed the 76th session of the United Nations, where he declared his readiness to be a moderator in the improvement of relations between Azerbaijan and Armenia. He also said that Georgia would take all possible steps to achieve peace in the South Caucasus. While in New York, he met many world leaders, including the prime minister of the United Kingdom and the chancellor of Germany.

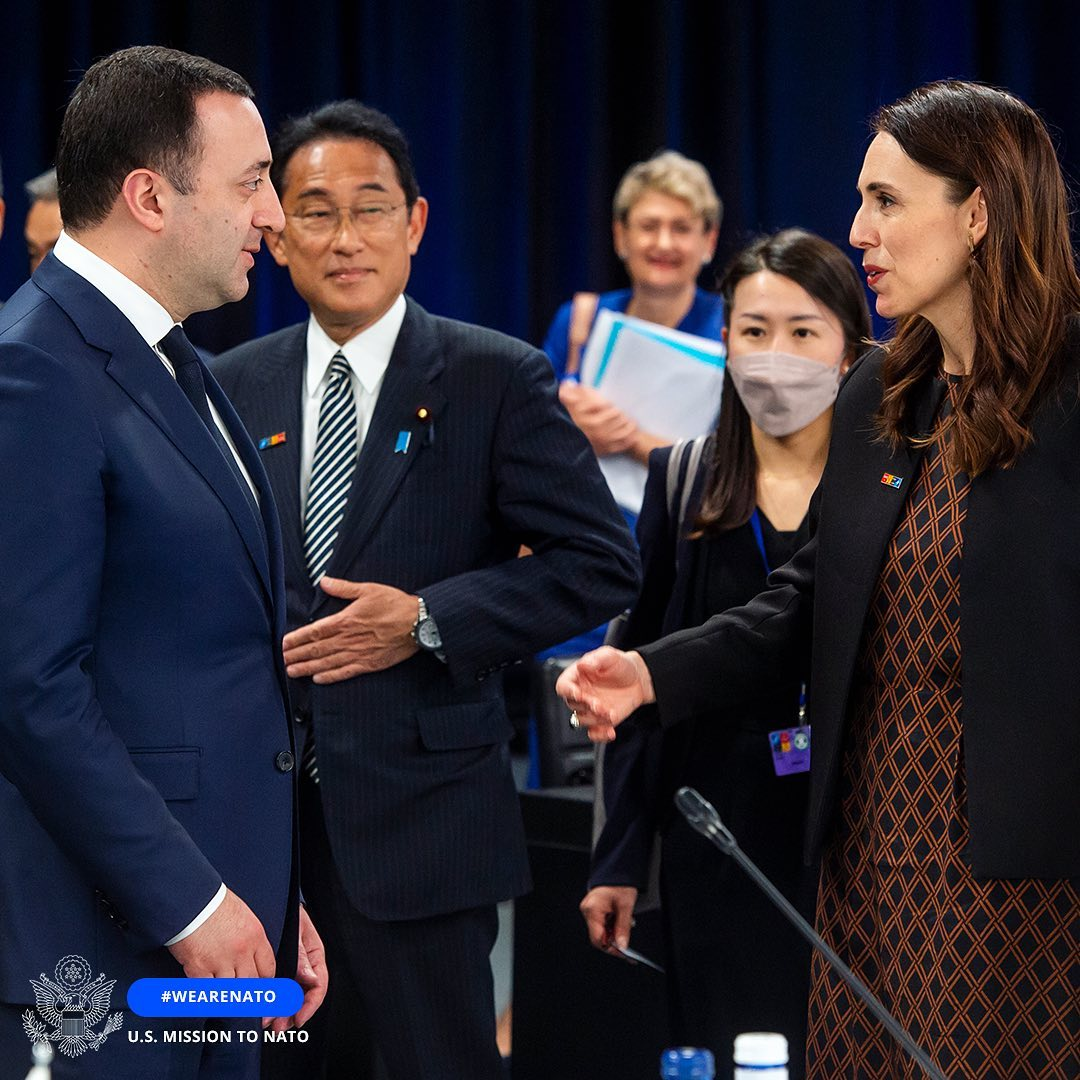
Irakli Garibashvili, Prime Minister of New Zealand Jacinda Ardern and Prime Minister of Japan Fumio Kishida at the 2022 Madrid summit

On 18 October 2021, US defense secretary Lloyd Austin visited Georgia. Garibashvili met him personally, and they talked about the improvement of defense cooperation between the US and Georgia.

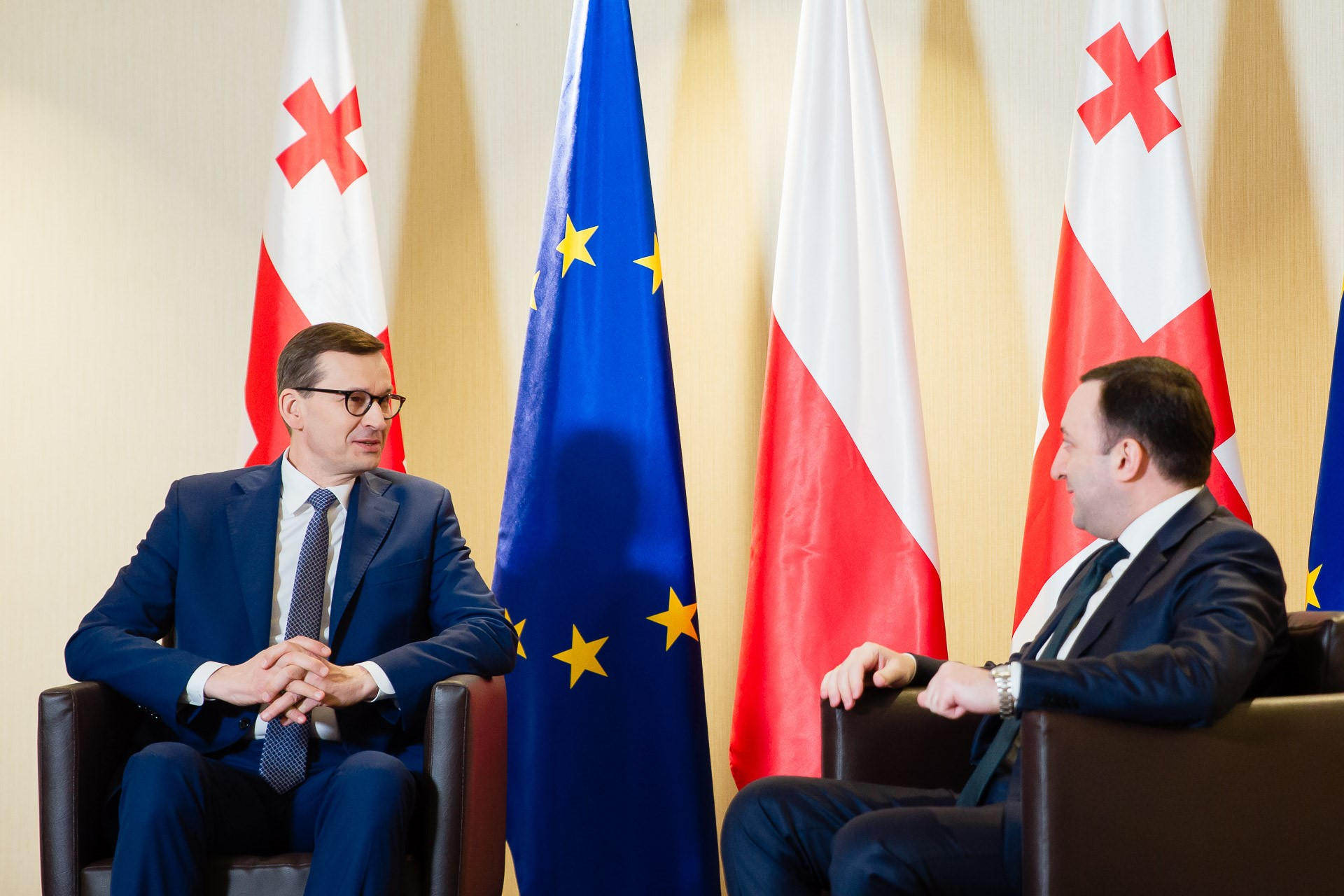
Meeting of Irakli Garibashvili with Polish prime minister Mateusz Morawiecki in Batumi, 2022

On 24 October 2022, Azerbaijani president Ilham Aliyev visited Georgia and along with Garibashvili, held a briefing with journalists in Mtskheta, the parties announced that they will deepen the relationship and Georgia will transport an even larger amount of oil from Azerbaijan through the Black Sea.

On 17 December, a decision was made in Davos to build a new oil terminal. between Azerbaijan, Georgia, Romania and Hungary. Billions of dollars will be spent on it and all parties will win. At the briefing held after signing the contract, it was announced that the project should be ready by 2027.

On 4 May 2023, Garibashvili attended the Conservative Political Action Conference in Hungary. He was second acting prime minister along with Hungarian prime minister to attend the event. Garibashvili was a keynote speech giver at the conference. In his speech, he announced his support for traditional and conservative values and denounced LGBT propaganda and the attempts to legislate gender-affirming procedures for the children. He also lauded Hungarian prime minister Viktor Orbán for his wise and visionary leadership.

In July 2023, Garibashvili hosted Uzbek prime minister Abdulla Aripov in Georgia, and afterwards, visited China and Kazakhstan. During Garibashvili's meeting with the Chinese leader Xi Jinping, the parties pledged to enhance cooperation and announced "strategic partnership" between China and Georgia.

Also in July, Garibashvili visited Croatia and met Prime Minister Andrej Plenković. This was the first visit of a Georgian prime minister to Croatia. During the joint press conference, the Croatian prime minister reaffirmed his support for Georgia's territorial integrity and Georgia's bid to join the European Union. The parties pledged to enhance the economic cooperation and it was announced that the Georgian embassy would be opened in Zagreb.

==== Application to join the European Union ====
In response to the outbreak of the 2022 Russian invasion in Ukraine on 24 February 2022 and fears that Russia might once again invade Georgia as it did in 2008, on 3 March 2022, Garibashvili signed the country's application for membership of the European Union (EU). The same day, Moldova (which experiences troubles regarding the Russian-backed separatist state Transnistria) also applied for EU membership.

In June 2022, the European Council expressed readiness to grant Georgia the status of a candidate after completing a set of reforms recommended by the commission.

=== Second resignation ===
On 29 January 2024, Garibashvili announced that he would step down from his position as Prime Minister and would accept an offer to become chairman of the Georgian Dream party ahead of parliamentary elections to be held later in the year. From 1 February 2024 till 25 April 2025 he served for the second time as chairman of Georgian Dream, after which he said to return to private business activities.

On 17 October 2025, Garibashvili's residence was raided by police as part of an investigation into illegal incomes earned during his premiership. On 24 October, he pled guilty to corruption charges related to laundering illegal income from his time in politics that carry a 12-year maximum jail sentence and was released on a one million Georgian lari bail. His lawyer said that he was cooperating with authorities.

== Political ratings ==
According to public polls, Irakli Garibashvili has one of the highest approval ratings among public figures in Georgia. In June 2021 poll by International Republican Institute, Garibashvili had 40% approval rating, which made him fourth most-approved public figure in Georgia at that time after Patriarch Ilia II (88% approval), Tbilisi Mayor Kakha Kaladze (58% approval) and former prime minister Giorgi Gakharia (56% approval). In March 2022 poll by IRI, 47% of respondents said they had favorable opinion of Garibashvili, making him the 4th most-approved public figure after Patriarch Ilia II (92% approval), Tbilisi Mayor Kakha Kaladze (53% approval) and President Salome Zurabishvili (52% approval). In October 2022 poll, Garibashvili (44% approval) was the third most approved public figure in Georgia after Patriarch Ilia II (88% approval) and Kakha Kaladze (51% approval), outpacing President Salome Zurabishvili (who had 38% approval). In March 2023 poll, Garibashvili again finished on 4th place (43%) behind Patriarch Ilia (91% approval), President Zurabishvili (48% approval) and Mayor Kaladze (52% approval).

== Political positions ==
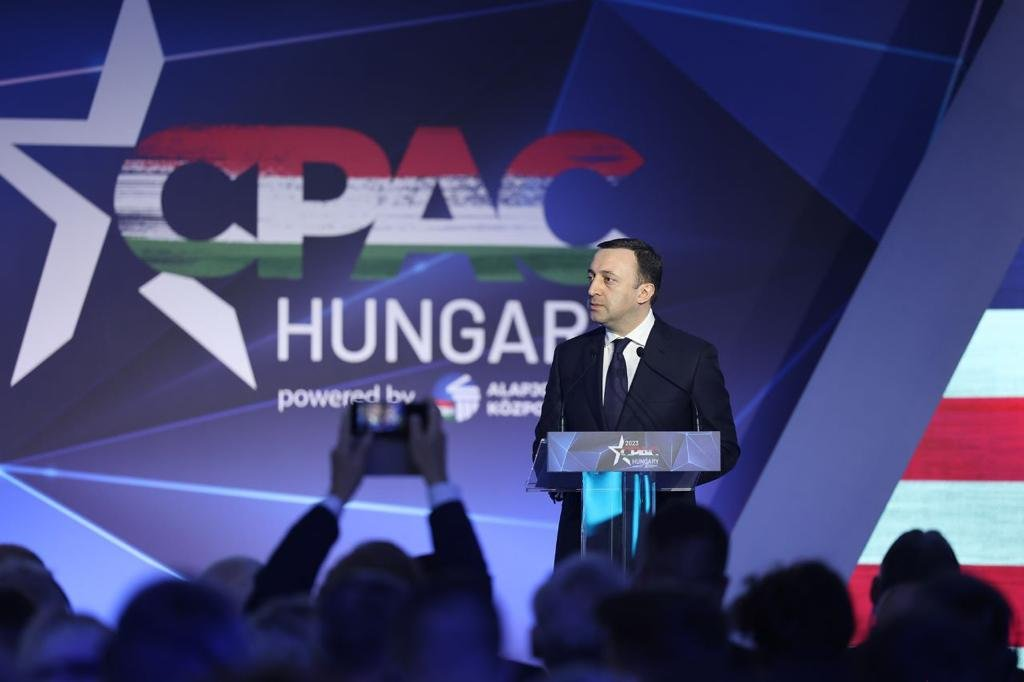
Irakli Garibashvili – keynote speech at CPAC Hungary 2023

Garibashvili has been described as a conservative-leaning politician. On several occasions, most notably with the Gay Pride march, he backed the conservative side of the debate, adopting a majoritarian approach while noting that "95% of our population are against holding propagandistic parade in a demonstrative manner." Garibashvili added that Georgia "is a conservative society" and has unique values based on Orthodox Christianity, emphasizing that the minority should not decide fate of the majority. In 2014 he proposed to solidify the definition of marriage as union between a man and a woman in the Constitution of Georgia to balance the opposition from conservatives and Orthodox Church to the adoption of the Anti-Discrimination law, which was Georgia's precondition to get a visa free regime with the EU.

In his address to parliament in 2021, Gharibashvili criticized the idea of a minimal state and the "invisible hand of the market". He said that "small state idea is a myth impeding the country's development" and called on the government to play an active role in economy. Gharibashvili stated that "history does not know the precedent of development by allowing processes to flow on their own" and "neither Europe nor America developed in this way". Gharibashvili also emphasized that Georgia should become economically more self-sufficient.

Gharibashvili opposed mandatory vaccination against COVID-19, saying that Georgian citizens should enjoy "the right and an opportunity of free choice".

== Personal life ==
Garibashvili is married to Nunuka Tamazashvili (born 1983), with three sons, Nikoloz (born 2005), Andria (born 2010), Gabriel (born 2015) and one daughter Nino (born 2016). His father-in-law, Tamaz Tamazashvili, is a former police general who was arrested on charges of illegally carrying and keeping weapon and explosives in October 2011. Garibashvili, a member of then-opposition Georgian Dream party, claimed the arrest was politically motivated. After the Georgian Dream acceded to power in October 2012, Tamazashvili was released from prison. In addition to Georgian, Garibashvili also speaks English, French and Russian.

== Honours ==
On 23 August 2021, President of Ukraine Volodymyr Zelenskyy awarded Garibashvili with the first degree order of merit during the Crimea Platform summit.

Political offices
| Preceded by Eka Zguladze as Acting minister | Minister of Internal Affairs; 2012–2013 | Succeeded by Aleksandre Chikaidze |
| Preceded by Bidzina Ivanishvili | Prime Minister of Georgia; 2013–2015 | Succeeded by Giorgi Kvirikashvili |
| Preceded by Levan Izoria | Minister of Defence; 2019–2021 | Succeeded by Juansher Burchuladze |
| Preceded by Giorgi Gakharia | Prime Minister of Georgia; 2021–2024 | Succeeded by Irakli Kobakhidze |
Party political offices
| Preceded by Bidzina Ivanishvili | Chairman of Georgian Dream; 2013–2015 | Succeeded by Giorgi Kvirikashvili |
| Preceded by Gia Volski | Political Secretary of Georgian Dream; 2019–2024 | Succeeded by Irakli Kobakhidze |
| Preceded by Irakli Kobakhidze | Chairman of Georgian Dream; 2024–present | Incumbent |
