= Giorgi Kvirikashvili =

Georgian politician

- გიორგი კვირიკაშვილი
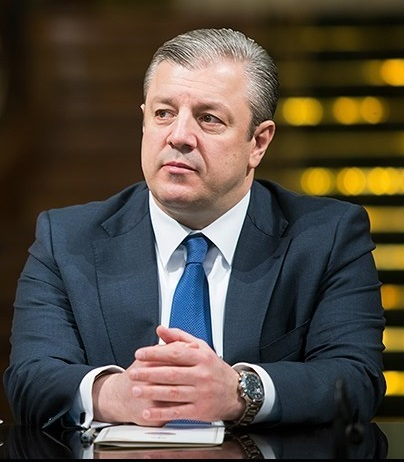
- Kvirikashvili in 2017

Prime Minister of Georgia
- In office 30 December 2015 – 13 June 2018
- President: Giorgi Margvelashvili
- Preceded by: Irakli Garibashvili
- Succeeded by: Mamuka Bakhtadze

Chairman of Georgian Dream
- In office 30 December 2015 – 26 April 2018
- Preceded by: Irakli Gharibashvili
- Succeeded by: Bidzina Ivanishvili

Minister of Foreign Affairs
- In office 1 September 2015 – 30 December 2015
- President: Giorgi Margvelashvili
- Prime Minister: Irakli Garibashvili
- Preceded by: Tamar Beruchashvili
- Succeeded by: Mikheil Janelidze

First Deputy Prime Minister of Georgia
- In office 26 July 2013 – 30 December 2015
- President: Mikheil Saakashvili; Giorgi Margvelashvili
- Prime Minister: Bidzina Ivanishvili; Irakli Gharibashvili
- Preceded by: Giorgi Margvelashvili
- Succeeded by: Dimitri Kumsishvili (2016)

Minister of Economy and Sustainable Development
- In office 25 October 2012 – 1 September 2015
- President: Mikheil Saakashvili; Giorgi Margvelashvili
- Prime Minister: Bidzina Ivanishvili; Irakli Garibashvili
- Preceded by: Vera Kobalia
- Succeeded by: Dimitri Kumsishvili

Member of the Parliament of Georgia
- In office 18 November 2016 – 30 November 2016
- In office 20 November 1999 – 22 April 2004

Personal details
- Born: 20 July 1967 (age 59) Tbilisi, Georgian SSR, USSR (now Georgia)
- Party: Georgian Dream (2012-2018); New Rights Party (2000-2004); Union of Citizens of Georgia (1999-2000)
- Education: Tbilisi State Medical University; Tbilisi State University; University of Illinois, Urbana-Champaign

Giorgi Kvirikashvili (Georgian: გიორგი კვირიკაშვილი; born 20 July 1967) is a Georgian politician who was Prime Minister of Georgia from 30 December 2015 to 13 June 2018. Prior to that he was Minister of Economy and Sustainable Development from 25 October 2012 until 1 September 2015, Minister of Foreign Affairs from 1 September 2015 until 30 December 2015, and Deputy Prime Minister from 26 July 2013 until 30 December 2015. Kvirikashvili has led initiatives to advance Euro-Atlantic and European integration and highlight Georgia as an attractive location for foreign investment.

On 20 June 2018, Mamuka Bakhtadze, who previously served as Kvirikashvili's Minister of Finance, was approved by the Georgian Parliament to succeed Kvirikashvili in a 99–6 vote.

== Education ==
Kvirikashvili was born in Tbilisi. From 1986 to 1988, he completed the compulsory military service in the Soviet army. He studied at the Tbilisi State Medical University and graduated with a degree in Internal Medicine in 1991. Then he completed an economics degree at the Tbilisi State University and graduated in 1995. In 1998, he matriculated to the University of Illinois where he obtained a master's degree in finances.

== Career ==
Kvirikashvili worked as an executive for various banks in Georgia from 1993 to 1999 and as a deputy head of fiscal and monetary office at the State Chancellery of the President of Georgia in 1999. In the same year, kvirikashvili joined president Eduard Shevardnadze's Ruling Party, Union of Citizens of Georgia (UCG) and became member of parliament. In 2000, with other 9 MPs kvirikashvili split from ruling UCG and founded new party named New Rights Party. After the Rose Revolution swept Mikheil Saakashvili to the presidency of Georgia, Kvirikashvili returned to his businesses. From 2006 to 2011, he was Director General of Cartu Bank, owned by the multi-billionaire tycoon Bidzina Ivanishvili. With Ivanishvili's entering politics and the victory of his Georgian Dream coalition over Saakashvili's United National Movement in the October 2012 parliamentary election, Kvirikashvili was appointed Minister of Economy and Sustainable Development of Georgia in the cabinet of Bidzina Ivanishvili in October 2012. He additionally assumed the office of Vice Prime Minister in July 2013. He retained both these positions in the succeeding cabinet of Irakli Garibashvili, Ivanishvili's choice as his successor, in November 2013.

== Prime minister ==
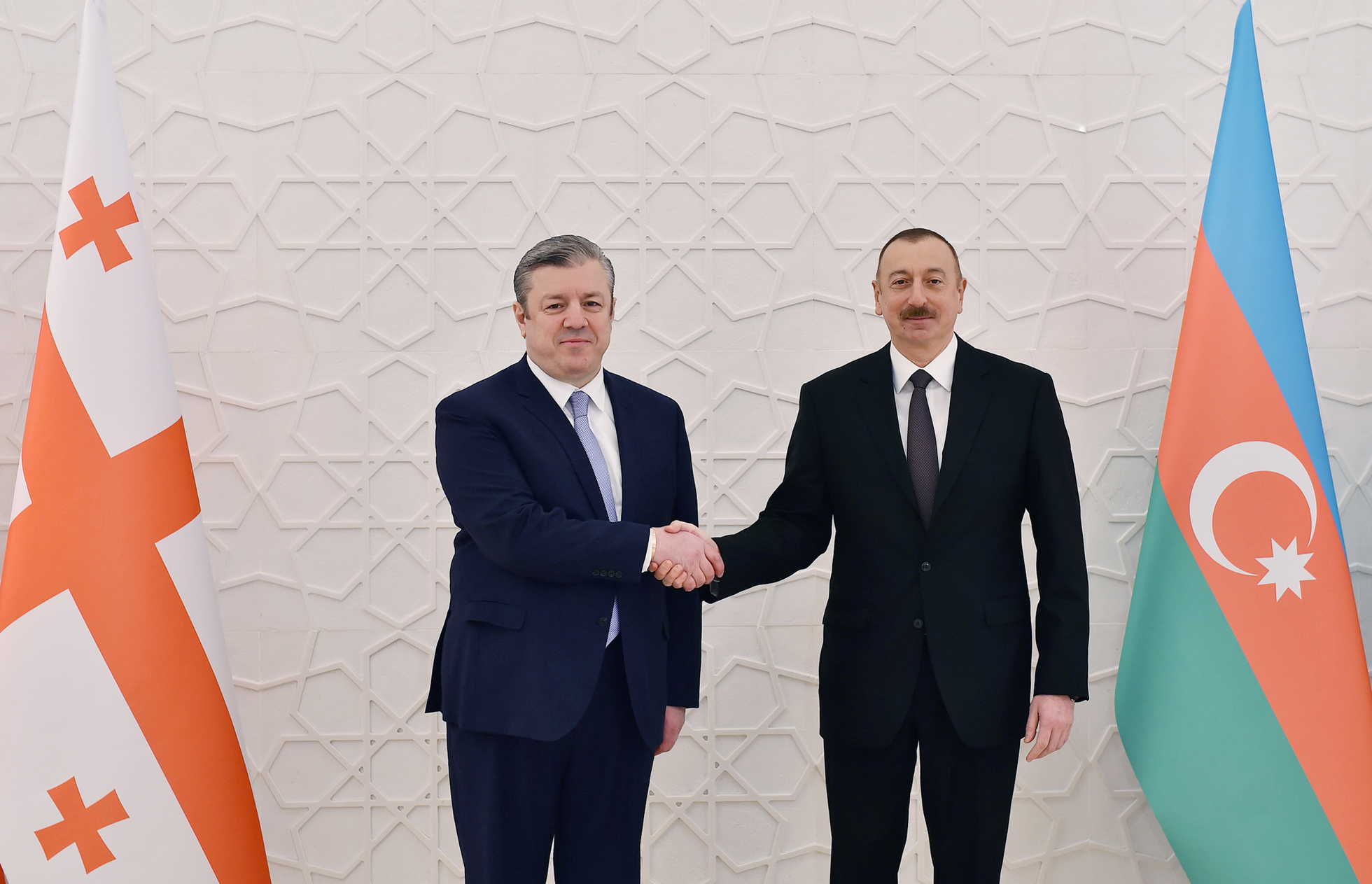
Kvirikashvili meeting with Azerbaijan's President Ilham Aliyev

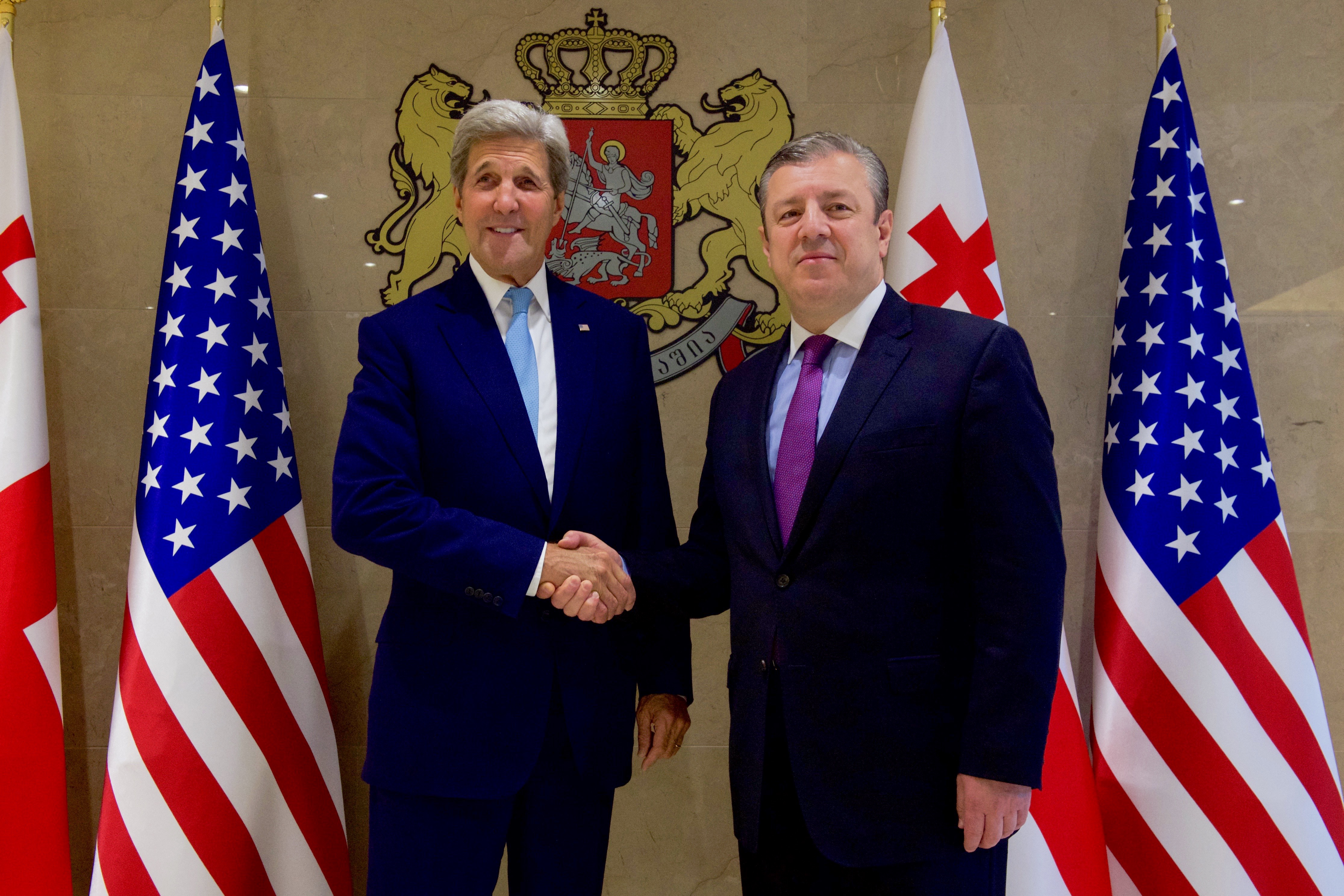
Kvirikashvili meeting with U.S. Secretary of State John Kerry

In December 2015, Kviriashvili was nominated by the Georgian Dream coalition as new prime minister after Irakli Garibashvili announced his resignation. Kvirikashvili and his incoming cabinet won the confidence vote in the Parliament with 86 votes to 28 on 30 December 2015. Kvirikashvili's government was focused on growing the economy and promoting entrepreneurship. One of the major reforms under his premiership was the so-called Estonian Tax model, which taxes a company's pay-out dividends but not its profits, in 2016. Kvirikashvili has said that he would like to make Georgian–American relations "a backbone of regional stability, economic development, and democratization."

In May 2018, two waves of protests erupted in Tbilisi: one over police raids on nightclubs over alleged illegal drug trade, and another over perceived miscarriage of justice by the Prosecutor's Office of Georgia in the case involving killing of teenagers in a street knife-combat. On 31 May 2018, Georgia's Chief Prosecutor Irakli Shotadze resigned over the case, calling accusations against him "political vengeance" by the opposition. On 1 June 2018, Prime Minister Irakli Kvirikashvili announced that the case would be transferred from the Prosecutor's Office to the Ministry of Internal Affairs for further investigation, and the creation of a special parliamentary fact-finding commission chaired by an opposition politician.

The protests calling for drug liberalization were met by conservative, nationalist and fascist counter-protests against the "drug dealers and LGBT propagandists", with Georgian president Giorgi Margvelashvili saying that Georgia "is on the brink of civil war". The Minister of Internal Affairs Giorgi Gakharia showed up in front of protesters on May 13 and apologized for alleged instances of police misconduct. He met the organizers of the protests and agreed to create two working groups. One group would work on the draft of a drug policy and another on the police raid and whether the individual law enforcers exceeded their powers or not. The actions of the minister caused negative reaction among the conservative public.

Prime Minister Kvirikashvili suddenly resigned on 13 June 2018, claiming "disagreements over fundamental issues with the leader of the ruling party" as the reason for his resignation, including possibly on economic issues. The incoming government was formed by the Finance Minister Mamuka Bakhtadze, who won the parliamentary vote of confidence with 99 votes in favor to 6 against on 20 June 2018. The cabinet was reconfirmed, with 101 votes in favor to 12 against, by the parliament on 14 July after the previously announced structural reforms in the cabinet ministries were implemented.

Political offices
Preceded by Vera Kobalia	Minister of Economy and Sustainable Development; 2012–2015	Succeeded by Dimitri Kumsishvili
Preceded by Tamar Beruchashvili	Minister of Foreign Affairs; 2015	Succeeded by Mikheil Janelidze
Preceded by Irakli Garibashvili	Prime Minister of Georgia; 2015–2018	Succeeded by Mamuka Bakhtadze
