= Embassy of Georgia, Washington, D.C. =

Diplomatic mission of the Republic of Georgia to the United States

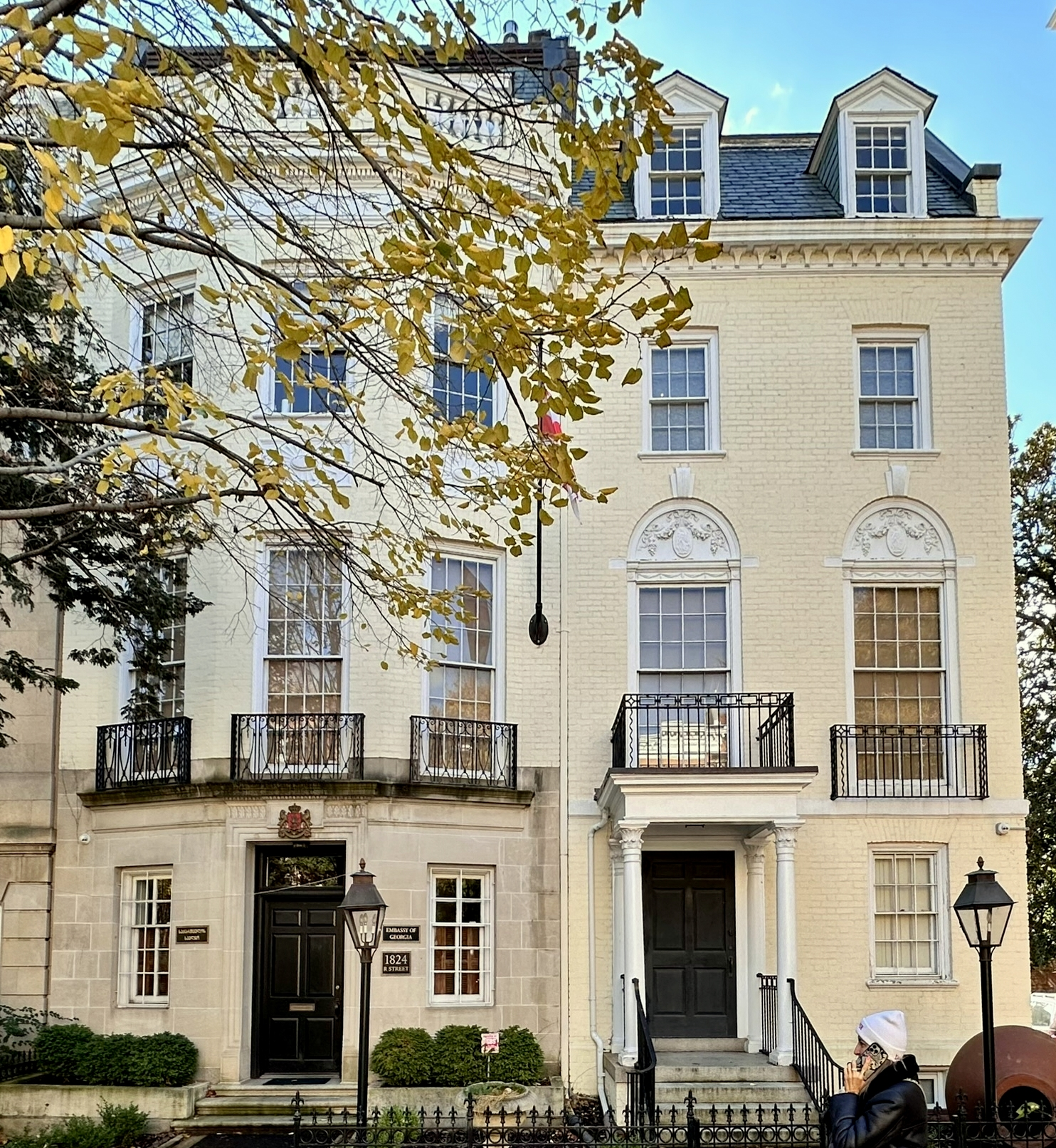
- Embassy of Georgia in 2023
- Location: Washington, D.C.
- Address: 1824 R Street, Northwest, Washington, D.C.
- Coordinates: 38°54′44.7″N 77°2′33.85″W
- Ambassador: Tamar Taliashvili
- Jurisdiction: United States also accredited to the Commonwealth of The Bahamas, The Republic of Haiti and Grenada
- Website: usa.mfa.gov.ge

The Embassy of Georgia in Washington, D.C., is the diplomatic mission of the Republic of Georgia to the United States. It is located at 1824 R Street, Northwest, Washington, D.C. The embassy was founded in 1993 after the establishment of diplomatic relations between Georgia and the United States.

The current ambassador of Georgia to the United States is Tamar Taliashvili, appointed in 2025.

The embassy serves as a Consulate of Georgia in Washington, D.C., and serves the citizens of Georgia residing in the following US states: District of Columbia, Virginia, Maryland, North Carolina, South Carolina, Georgia and Florida.

Georgia has consulates-general located in New York City and in San Francisco.

== Bilateral Relations ==
Since 1993, Georgia and United States have been engaged in diplomatic relations encompassing multiple sectors. In 2009, Georgia and United States advanced bilateral relations to a new level by signing a Strategic Partnership Agreement which deepens cooperation between the two states in multiple fields. The first meeting of the Strategic Partnership Commission, held on June 22, 2009, launched four bilateral working groups on priority areas identified in the Charter: democracy, defense and security, economic, trade and energy issues, and people-to-people and cultural exchanges. Senior-level Georgian and American policy-makers lead yearly meetings of each working group to review commitments, update activities, and establish future objectives. Annual plenary sessions of the commission are co-chaired by Prime-Minister of Georgia and the United States Secretary of State.

== List of Ambassadors of Georgia to the United States ==
- Tamar Taliashvili (2025–Present)
- David Zalkaliani (2022–2024)
- David Bakradze (2016–2022)
- Archil Gegeshidze (2013–2016)
- Temur Yakobashvili (2010–2013)
- Batu Kutelia (2009–2010)
- Vasil Sikharulidze (2007–2009)
- Levan Mikeladze (2003–2007)
- Tedo Japaridze (1994–2003)
- Petre Chkheidze (1993–1994)

== See also ==
- Georgia–United States relations
- List of ambassadors of Georgia (country) to the United States
