= Georgian Foundation for Strategic and International Studies =

Georgian think tank

- Founder: Alexander Rondeli
- Established: 1998
- Mission: help improve public policy decision-making in Georgia through research and analysis, training of policymakers and policy analysts, and public education about the strategic issues, both domestic and international, facing Georgia and the Caucasus
- President: Eka Metreveli
- Key people: Temuri Yakobashvili; Irakli Menagharishvili; David J. Smith; Vladimer Papava; Merab Kakulia; Kakha Gogolashvili; Khatuna Mshvidobadze; Giorgi Badridze; Valeri Chechelashvili; Shota Utiashvili
- Location: Tbilisi, Georgia
- Website: www.gfsis.org

The Georgian Foundation for Strategic and International Studies also known as Rondeli Foundation (GFSIS; Georgian: საქართველოს სტრატეგიისა და საერთაშორისო ურთიერთობების კვლევის ფონდი) is one of Georgia's leading independent think tanks, based in Tbilisi. It was founded in 1998 with the declared aim of "helping improve public policy decision-making in Georgia through research and analysis, training of policymakers and policy analysts, and public education about the strategic issues, both domestic and international, facing Georgia and the Caucasus". It has played an important role in training new public servants and scholars.

The GFSIS includes several leading experts on politics, social studies, and economics in Georgia, many of them with experience as former high-ranking government officials and strong ties with the country's top education institutions, such as Alexander Rondeli, Temuri Yakobashvili, Vladimer Papava, Merab Kakulia, and Archil Gegeshidze.
