= Kakulia =

Kakulia (Georgian: კაკულია) is a Georgian surname. Notable people with the surname include:

- Merab Kakulia (born 1961), Georgian economist
- Teimuraz Kakulia (1947—2006), Soviet tennis player and Soviet/Georgian tennis coach
