= List of international presidential trips made by Salomé Zourabichvili =

The following is a list of international presidential trips made by Salomé Zourabichvili since she became the 5th President of Georgia on 16 December 2018.

== 2019 ==
Country	Areas visited	Date(s)	Details	Photo
Belgium	Brussels	January 21	Working visit to the European Union, European Parliament, and NATO	
Afghanistan	Kabul, Bagram	February 8	Official Visit to President Ashraf Ghani, working visit to inspect Georgian troops at the Bagram Air Field	
France	Paris, Leuville-sur-Orge	19-20 February	State visit to sign the Dimitri Amilakhvari Structured Dialogue Declaration	
Germany	Berlin	20-21 February	The meeting highlighted Germany’s special role in Georgia’s EU integration process.	
Azerbaijan	Baku, Zaqatala, Qakh	27-28 February	Zourabichvili stated that the two countries started a new, independent life together after the collapse of the Soviet Union.	
Lithuania	Vilnius	7-8 March	Georgian President says that Lithuania is a good example for Georgia on how to join NATO and the EU.	
Armenia	Yerevan	13-14 March	President Salome Zurabishvili said that the level of her delegation testifies to a great interest towards cooperation with Armenia.	
Poland	Warsaw	7 May	The presidents spoke about the situation in Georgia’s occupied regions, the country’s EU and NATO aspirations, as well as on deepening Georgian-Polish economic and cultural ties.	
France	Paris	14 May	Participation at the Euronews conference "Popular Europe or Populist Europe?"	
Latvia	Riga	15-16 May	During the meeting, the President of Latvia announced support for Georgia’s European integration and its territorial integrity	
Estonia	Tallinn	16-17 May	The Georgian President said the two countries “are following the same path to the same future”.	
Ukraine	Kyiv	20 May	Inauguration of President Volodymyr Zelenskyy as President of Ukraine.	
Switzerland	Geneva	10-11 June	Keynote address at the centennial celebration of the International Labour Organization	
Belarus	Minsk	20-21 June	Opening ceremony of the 2019 European Games and meeting with President Alexander Lukashenko. Meeting cut short following the beginning of the 2019 Georgian protests.	
United States	New York	24-30 September	Salome Zurabichvili is holding a number of meetings on the sidelines of the 74th session of the United Nations General Assembly (UNGA) in New York.	

== 2020 ==
Country	Areas visited	Date(s)	Notes
Israel	Jerusalem	21-23 January	Travelled to Jerusalem for the World Holocaust Forum to commemorate the 75 years since the liberation of the Auschwitz-Birkenau death camp.
France	Strasbourg	28 January	

== 2021 ==
Country	Areas visited	Date(s)	Notes	Photo
North Macedonia	Skopje	10 May		
Monaco	Monte Carlo	9 June	Georgian President Salome Zurabishvili promoted Georgian wine at a special event entitled 'Meeting with Vine Roots' which was attended by His Serene Highness the Prince of Monaco Albert II and locals as well as Georgian winemakers.	
Vatican	Vatican	16 June	Salome Zurabishvili has met with Pope Francis. During the meeting they discussed a number of issues including the importance of global solidarity during the Covid-19 pandemic, the grave humanitarian situation in the Russian-occupied Georgian regions of Abkhazia and Tskhinvali, as well as Georgia’s role of a mediator between Armenia and Azerbaijan to promote peace and stability in the region.	
Ukraine	Kyiv	23 June	During the conversation, special attention was paid to the practical cooperation between Ukraine and Georgia in the context of deepening relations with the EU and NATO.	
France	Paris	1 July	Presidents discussed intensification and further development of bilateral political and economic relations between the two countries, the ongoing processes in the region, and the EU’s role in the region and Black Sea security issues.	
Austria	Vienna	11-13 October	Georgian President Salome Zurabishvili has paid a historic official visit to Austria. She is the first Georgia president to visit the country in an official capacity for the first time in 100 years.	
Switzerland	Geneva, Bern	13-15 October	President Salome Zourabichvili met with Swiss President Guy Parmelin in Bern to discuss bilateral relations, Swiss policy on peace, economic ties and security in the Caucasus.	
