= Embassy of the United States, Tbilisi =

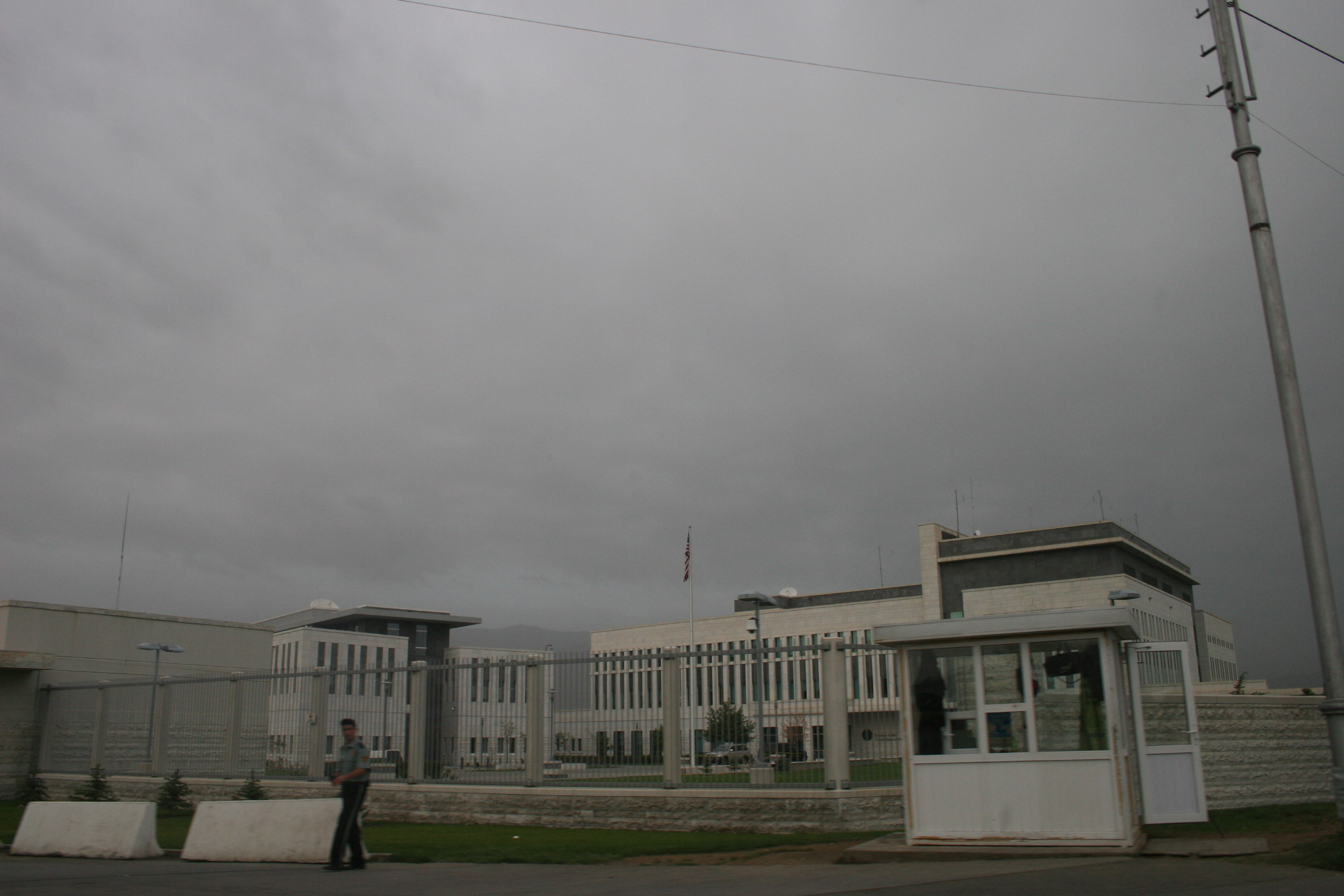
- Location: (Georgia (country)) Tbilisi, Georgia
- Address: 29 Georgian-American Friendship Ave, Tbilisi, Georgia
- Coordinates: 41°47′17″N 44°46′34″E
- Website: https://ge.usembassy.gov

The Embassy of the United States in Tbilisi is the diplomatic mission of the United States of America in Georgia.

== History ==
The United States recognized Georgia's independence on December 25, 1991, as part of the dissolution of the Soviet Union, with which Georgia had been a constituent republic. Diplomatic relations between the United States and Georgia were established on March 24, 1992, under the presidency of George H. W. Bush. Shortly thereafter, the American Embassy in Tbilisi was established on April 23, 1992, with Carey Cavanaugh serving as the Chargé d’Affaires ad interim.

In 2023, the U.S. Embassy in Tbilisi faced scrutiny during the 2023 Georgian protests, which arose over a proposed "Law on Transparency of Foreign Influence." This law required NGOs to register as "agents of foreign influence" if over 20% of their funding came from abroad. Amidst these protests, some political groups, notably the People's Power movement, accused the U.S. Embassy of intervening in Georgia's domestic affairs and influencing its foreign policy, particularly in relation to the Russo-Ukrainian War.

== See also ==
- Embassy of Georgia, Washington, D.C.
- Georgia–United States relations
- List of ambassadors of the United States to Georgia
