= Gegeshidze =

Gegeshidze (Georgian: გეგეშიძე) is a Georgian surname. Notable people with the surname include:

- Archil Gegeshidze (born 1956), Georgian politician
- Vladimer Gegeshidze (born 1985), Georgian wrestler
