= List of ambassadors of Georgia to the United States =

Coordinates: 38°54′44.7″N 77°2′33.85″W

Ambassador of Georgia to the United States
- საქართველოს ელჩი შეერთებულ შტატებში
- Seal of the Ministry of Foreign Affairs of Georgia
- Incumbent; Tamar Taliashvili since June 10, 2025
- Ministry of Foreign Affairs of Georgia; Embassy of Georgia in Washington, D.C.
- Style: His or Her Excellency (formal); Mr. or Madam Ambassador (informal)
- Reports to: Foreign Minister; Prime Minister
- Seat: Washington D.C., United States
- Nominator: Prime Minister
- Appointer: President
- Inaugural holder: Peter Chkheidze
- Formation: September 3, 1993
- Website: usa.mfa.gov.ge

The Georgian ambassador in Washington, D. C. is the official representative of the Georgian Government in the United States.

== List of representatives ==
Diplomatic agrément	Diplomatic accreditation	ambassador	Observations	Prime Minister of Georgia	President of the United States	Term end
June 14, 1993	September 3, 1993	Peter Chkheidze		Eduard Shevardnadze	Bill Clinton	
December 7, 1994	January 30, 1995	Tedo Japaridze		Otar Patsatsia	Bill Clinton	
June 28, 2002	July 30, 2002	Levan Mikeladze		Avtandil Jorbenadze	George W. Bush	
March 9, 2006	March 13, 2006	Vasil Sikharulidze		Zurab Noghaideli	George W. Bush	
March 19, 2009	May 20, 2009	Batu Kutelia		Nika Gilauri	Barack Obama	
February 15, 2011	February 23, 2011	Temur Iakobashvili		Nika Gilauri	Barack Obama	
April 12, 2013	April 15, 2013	Archil Gegeshidze		Irakli Garibashvili	Barack Obama	
2015		Giorgi Tsikolia		Giorgi Kvirikashvili	Barack Obama	
2015		Giorgi Khelashvili		Giorgi Kvirikashvili	Barack Obama	
2016		Davit Bakradze		Giorgi Kvirikashvili	Donald Trump	
April 4, 2022		David Zalkaliani		Irakli Garibashvili	Joe Biden	
June 10, 2025		Tamar Taliashvili		Irakli Kobakhidze	Donald Trump	
