= Mikheil Janelidze =

Georgian government official

Mikheil Janelidze მიხეილ ჯანელიძე
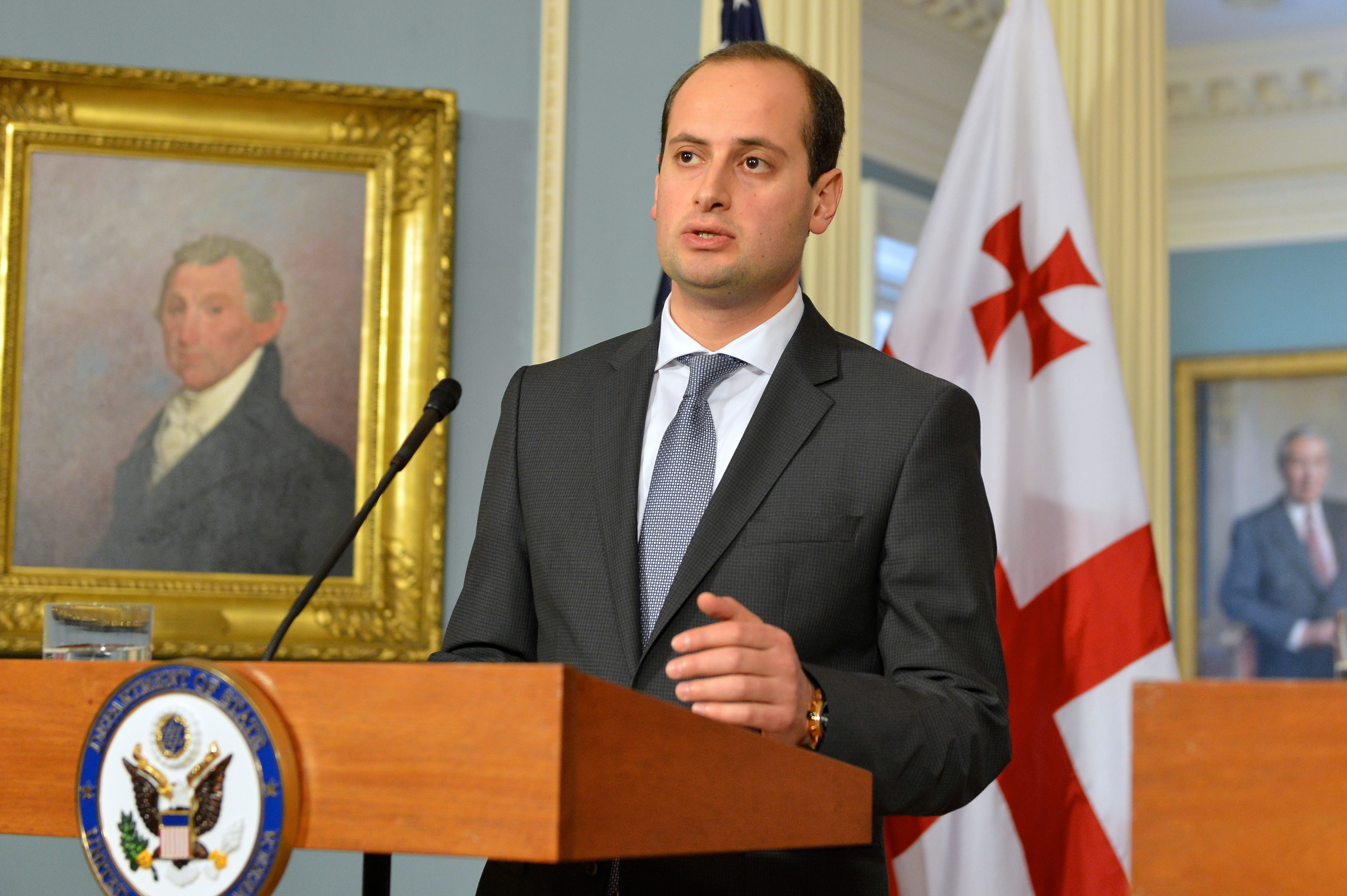

Minister of Foreign Affairs
- In office 30 December 2015 – 13 June 2018
- President: Giorgi Margvelashvili
- Prime Minister: Giorgi Kvirikashvili
- Preceded by: Giorgi Kvirikashvili
- Succeeded by: David Zalkaliani

Deputy Prime Minister of Georgia
- In office 12 July 2017 – 13 June 2018
- President: Giorgi Margvelashvili
- Prime Minister: Giorgi Kvirikashvili
- Preceded by: Kakha Kaladze
- Succeeded by: Maya Tskitishvili

Personal details
- Born: 29 March 1981 (age 45) Kutaisi, Georgia SSR, Soviet Union
- Party: Independent
- Children: 1
- Education: Tbilisi State University; Grenoble Graduate School of Business; Caucasus University; MIT Sloan School of Management

Mikheil Janelidze (Georgian: მიხეილ ჯანელიძე; born 29 March 1981) is a Georgian politician, who is a chairman of the Center for European Governance & Economy. He previously served as Vice Prime Minister (2017–2018), Minister of Foreign Affairs (2015–2018), First Deputy Minister of Foreign Affairs (2015) and Deputy Minister of Economy and Sustainable Development of Georgia (2011-2015).

== Early life and education ==
Mikheil Janelidze was born on 29 March 1981 in Kutaisi, Georgia. His father, Kirile Janelidze, was a lawyer and devoted his whole career to the Prosecutors Office of Georgia. Kirile Janelidze held positions of Chief Prosecutor of the Imereti Region and Deputy Chief Prosecutor of Tbilisi. Mikheil’s mother, Nineli Janelidze (maiden name: Shengelia), a medical doctor, served as a director of neonatology department at the maternity hospital in Kutaisi.

Mikheil attended St. Nino Gymnasium in Kutaisi in 1987-1996 and Hochwald Gymnasium in Wadern, Germany as an exchange student in 1996–1997. While in Germany, he lived in the family of Friedrich Ebert, a teacher, writer, humanitarian and promoter of German-Georgian friendship.

Mikheil moved to Tbilisi in 1997 to pursue his graduate studies. In 2002, he graduated with honors from the faculty of International Law and International Relations of the Tbilisi State University and attained a bachelor's degree with a specialization in international relations. In 2003, Mikheil was nominated by the Ministry of Foreign Affairs of Georgia as a candidate for the post-graduate studies at the Diplomatic Academy of the Russian Federation. He moved to Moscow, Russia to pursue his post-graduate studies at the faculty of International Law. At the academy he did a research on the topic of dispute settlement system of the World Trade Organization.

In Spring of 2006, Janelidze returned to Georgia and continued his career in the private sector. He held several high managerial positions and worked mostly in the field of business development. In 2008, Mikheil commenced the Dual MBA program of Grenoble Ecole de Management, France and Caucasus School of Business, Georgia. He graduated from the program with distinction with a specialization in Global Management. In his master thesis, he developed a strategic framework for assessment of an investment environment of a country. Janelidze completed an Executive Program of MIT Sloan School of Management on Artificial Intelligence in 2018.

== Career in Trade and Economic Field ==
Mikheil Janelidze took the position of a Head of Foreign Trade and International Economic Relations Department of the Ministry of Economic Development of Georgia in 2009. During this period, he led the work of the ministry on the first trade policy review of Georgia under the WTO. He chaired working groups of the different intergovernmental economic commissions. Mikheil was on the government's task-force responsible for the preparation of Georgia for the Deep and Comprehensive Free Trade Area (DCFTA) agreement with the European Union. At the same time, Mikheil undertook the reform of the department, including introduction of the technological innovation for raising the effectiveness of the unit. In 2011, Janelidze was awarded with the Order of Honor for his contributions to the foreign trade policy development of Georgia.

In 2011, Janelidze was promoted to the position of a Deputy Minister of Economy and Sustainable Development of Georgia and was appointed as a Chief Trade Negotiator of Georgia. He headed Georgian delegation at the 8th Ministerial Conference of the World Trade Organization. Janelidze successfully concluded negotiations with the European Union on the DCFTA and initialled the agreement at the Eastern Partnership Summit (EaP) in Vilnius on 28 November 2013.

In 2013–2015, Mikheil led the trade policy reforms of Georgia associated with the DCFTA. In this period, Georgia launched free trade negotiations with European Free Trade Association and China, conducted High-Level Trade Dialogue with the United States and negotiated """Statement of Principles for International Investment" and "Trade Principles for Information and Communication Technology (ICT) Services”. Janelidze was representing Georgia in negotiations on establishing the Asian Infrastructure Investment Bank. In addition to the trade policy, Mikheil was responsible for the economic policy, construction policy and spatial development. He supervised the construction code drafting process and initiated the process of preparation of the first spatial development plan of Georgia. Mikheil was a member of the task-force responsible for the development of the “Produce in Georgia” program.

== Diplomacy ==
Janelidze first entered the diplomatic service of Georgia in 2002 as an expert at the Ministry of Foreign Affairs of Georgia, where he worked until 2003.

In September 2015, Janelidze returned to the Ministry of Foreign Affairs and held the position of the First Deputy Minister of Foreign Affairs before his appointment as a Foreign Minister of Georgia in December 2015. During this period, he was supervising diplomatic relations with the Americas and economic diplomacy. Janelidze co-chaired Democracy and Governance Working Group and People-to-People and Cultural Exchanges Working Groups of the U.S.-Georgia Strategic Partnership Commission (SPC).

In December 2015, the parliament of Georgia approved Mikheil Janelidze as a foreign minister in the new cabinet, headed by the Prime Minister Giorgi Kvirikashvili.

=== Georgia's Conflict with the Russian Federation ===
Mikheil Janelidze pursued diplomacy oriented on resolving the conflict with the Russian Federation by exclusively peaceful means, in accordance with relevant international agreements and with full respect for the fundamental principles of international law.

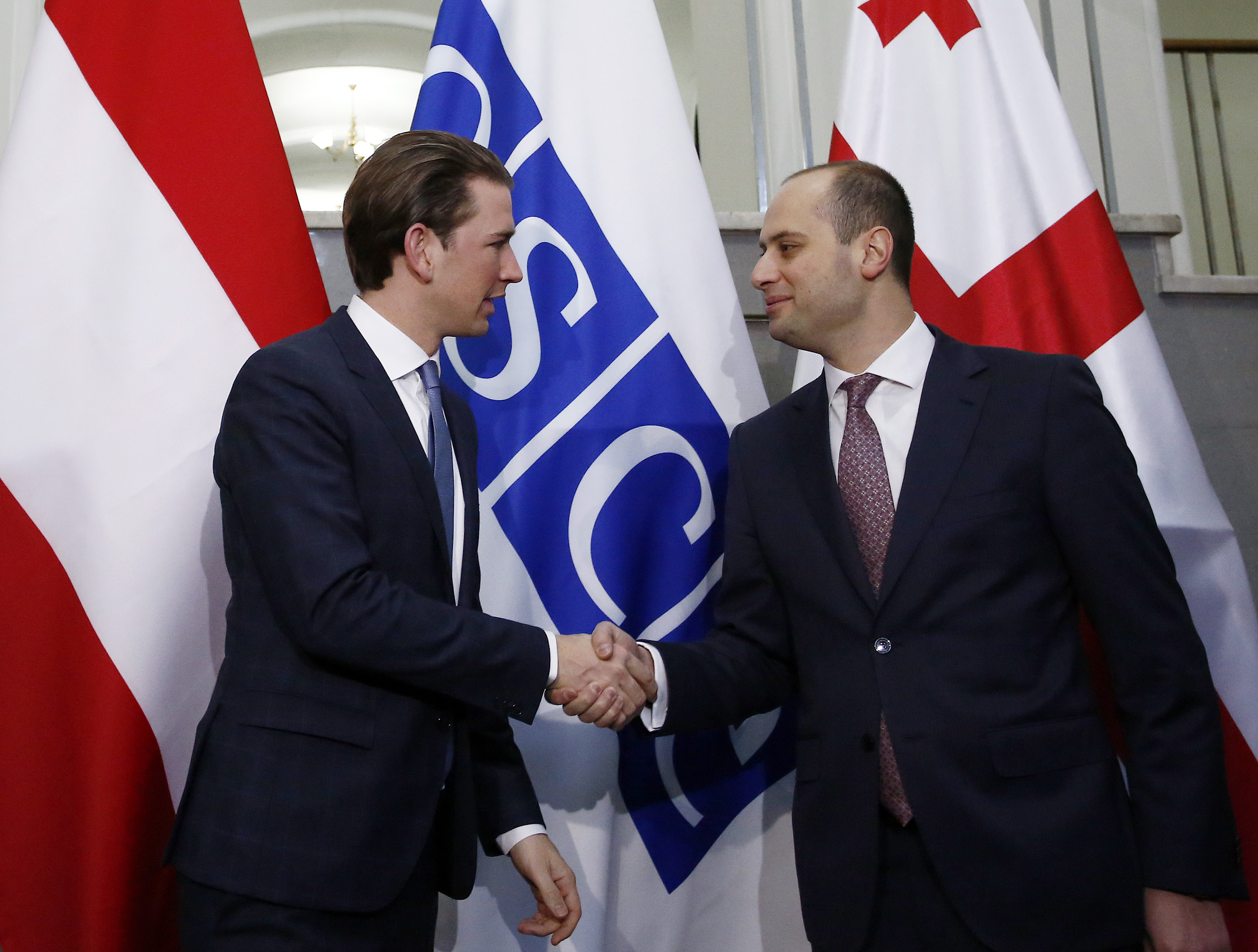
Austrian Foreign Minister Sebastian Kurz in his capacity as OSCE Chairman meets Foreign Minister of Georgia Mikheil Janelidze in Tbilisi.

Mikheil worked on activation of all international formats and instruments for addressing issues related to the de-occupation of the Georgian territories by the Russian military forces and human rights violations on the territories. Janelidze was the first foreign minister of Georgia to participate in the debate related to the conflict at the Security Council of the UN since the Russian military invasion in Georgia in 2008. In 2017 and 2018, record number of UN Members voted in favor of the United Nations General Assembly resolution reiterating the right of return of all displaced persons and refugees to Georgia’s Abkhazia and Tskhinvali Region/South Ossetia. In 2017, the United Nations (UN) Human Rights Council (HRC) adopted the first Resolution on Cooperation with Georgia, expressing serious concern over the human rights and humanitarian situation in Abkhazia and Tskhinvali Regions of Georgia, calling for immediate access for the Office of the High Commissioner to the regions and reaffirming the commitment of the HRC to the sovereignty and territorial integrity of Georgia within its internationally recognized borders. In 2016, the Committee of Ministers' Deputies of the Council of Europe with absolute majority adopted a decision, which, first time, emphasized the responsibility of Russia as a state exercising effective control over Georgia’s occupied territories to ensure the protection of human rights there. For the first time since the Russia-Georgia war in August 2008, a special group within the Organization for Security and Cooperation in Europe (OSCE) adopted a declaration on the conflict that supports Georgia's territorial integrity and condemned the occupation of Georgian soil. In May 2017, U.S. President Donald Trump signed the Consolidated Appropriations Act, 2017, which, for the first time, included the US sanction, a provision that no appropriated funds may be used to support "the Russian occupation of the Georgian territories of Abkhazia and Tskhinvali Region/South Ossetia" or to assist the governments of other countries that have recognized the two territories' independence. This was the first time when the Russian occupation of the Georgian territories appeared in a US legislative act. The August 2017 Countering America’s Adversaries Through Sanctions Act, inter alia, made reference to Russia's "illegal occupation of South Ossetia and Abkhazia in Georgia" and its disregard of "the terms of the August 2008 ceasefire agreement".

Janelidze was supportive to Geneva International Discussions and Georgia's constructive participation in this format. In 2016, during the 35th round of the Geneva International Discussions, the agreement was reached on the resumption of meetings of the Incident Prevention and Response Mechanism in Gali (IPRM), Abkhazia region. The other priorities within this format were achieving fulfillment by the Russian Federation of the cease-fire agreement through de-occupation, creation of international security mechanisms and non-use of force pledge by Russia, together with the protection of IDPs, their return and creation of dignified conditions for them. As the Geneva Talks were held on the level of the working groups, Janelidze was actively raising the issue of reconvening the talks on the higher level, including the plenary format.

In April 2018, the Government of Georgia adopted a new peacemaking initiative "Step Towards a Better Future" aimed at improving the humanitarian, social and economic conditions of the populations in Georgia’s Russian-occupied regions through enhanced cooperation across the occupation line. "The package of proposals adopted today by the Government of Georgia can benefit the citizens living on both sides of the Administrative Boundary Lines by facilitating trade, education and mobility," said the EU spokesperson in a statement issued on 4 April. The initiative was presented by Mikheil Janelidze and discussed on the side event of the "High-Level meeting on peacebuilding and sustaining peace" organized by the UN.

=== European and Euro-Atlantic Integration ===
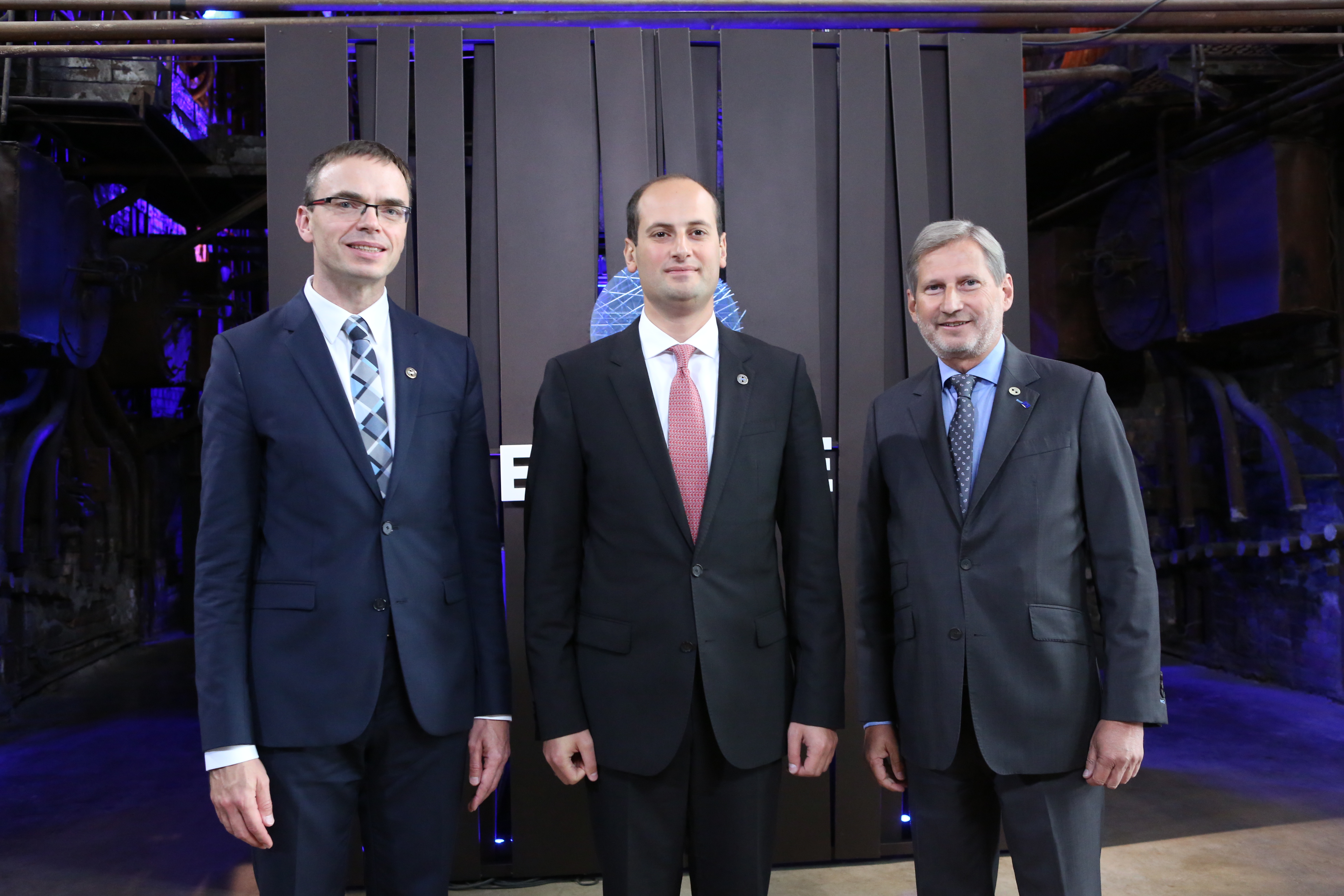
After Gymnich: Arrivals and handshake (Eastern Partnership countries) Sven Mikser, Mikheil Janelidze and Johannes Hahn

Mikheil Janelidze continued his active work on the European integration agenda of Georgia in his new capacity. He coordinated negotiations with the European Union as well as implementation of the EU related reforms by the Government of Georgia. In 2017, Georgia achieved a visa-free travel arrangement with the European Union for Georgian citizens. By December 2015 Georgia had fulfilled the Visa Liberalization Action Plan monitored by the EU Commission and the ball was on the side of EU Member States and EU Institutions to take their decisions, though they were reluctant to move the process forward due to the migration crisis in the EU and requests from other countries as well, like Ukraine, Turkey and Kosovo to grant visa free regimes. The German Chancellor, Angela Merkel, has described the migrant crisis as a "historic test" for Europe. "We fully understand the difficulties the EU is facing today, from increased migration to the rise of populism and extremist ideologies. However, we should also look at the costs of unnecessary and hardly justified delays in making decisions to honor mutual commitments," Janelidze stated at the Conference ‘Visa Liberalization as an EU Foreign Policy Tool’ in Brussels on 1 December 2016. After the active negotiations with the different stakeholders in the EU and its member states, Georgia achieved a visa-free travel arrangement with the European Union for Georgian citizens in March 2017. Georgia successfully implemented the first EU Association Agenda and negotiated a new, more ambitious agenda for 2017–2020. After the visa-liberalization process, in order to set new targets for achieving Georgia's eventual membership in the EU, Mikheil Janelidze initiated a "Road Map 2 EU", prioritizing the full and effective implementation of the Association Agreement, including DCFTA with the EU; enhancing the integration process with 6 new directions (1. Deeper institutional and legislative approximation; 2. Joining more EU agencies; 3. Joining more EU programs; 4. Strengthening Sectoral Dialogue; 5. Broadening dialogue on defense and security; 6. Achieving maximum physical integration with the EU market through transport, energy and communication projects.); Full realization of the potential provided by the Eastern Partnership Program its program "20 Deliverables for 2020". The first high-level EU–Georgia Strategic Security Dialogue took place in 2017 in Tbilisi. The meeting confirmed the EU's appreciation for Georgia's important role in strengthening security and stability in the region and beyond. Janelidze signed the Agreement between Georgia and the European Union on Security Procedures for Exchanging and Protecting Classified Information as another step towards the integration with the EU and confirmation that Georgia is a reliable partner to the EU. Georgia was named by EBRD as a leader of the second wave of countries in eastern and central Europe, with its progressive reforms. Georgia joined the Energy Community to develop its energy sector and make a step closer to ensuring this sector meets top European standards. After the structural reform of the government of Georgia, which included the merger of the Ministry of Foreign Affairs and the State Minister's Office for European and Euroatlantic Integration, Janelidze created the EU Integration General Directorate under the Ministry of Foreign Affairs.

Janelidze was supportive not only to Georgia's European path but of the whole Eastern European region. He contributed to the development of the Eastern Partnership program of the EU. He pushed for more individual approach from the EU towards the integration agendas of the Eastern Partnership countries but at the same time for keeping the platform working for all. Janelidze in the run-up to Eastern Partnership Summit in Brussels, Foreign Minister Mikheil Janelidze took part in the annual Eastern Partnership (EaP) ministerial meeting chaired by EU foreign policy chief Federica Mogherini in Luxembourg on 19 June 2017. Speaking at her joint doorstep together with Commissioner Hahn, Federica Mogherini praised "a very good ministerial meeting," saying things were moving "in a very good way" with all six of the Eastern Partnership countries "bilaterally and all together," despite having "a differentiated approach" with each of the countries. At a meeting of foreign ministers from the European Union (EU) Member States and Eastern Partnership countries in Tallinn, Estonia in September 2017, Janelidze stated that within the Eastern Partnership, countries enjoy a different pace of development and integration, but it is important that the unity is maintained as all of these countries have shared goals. At the trilateral meeting, Georgia’s Foreign Minister Mikheil Janelidze and his Ukrainian and Moldavian counterparts - Pavlo Klimkin and Andrei Galbur, discussed concrete ways how the three EU Associated countries could more enhance their ties with the EU. Ahead of the Brussel’s Summit Polish and Swedish foreign ministers, Waszykowski and Wallström, paid a visit to Georgia to promote Georgia’s EU membership. At the joint press-conference Waszczykowski clarified that for the moment it is not possible to offer a perspective of full EU membership to Georgia. Nevertheless, he noted, the EU acknowledges the determination and efforts made so far and said there is "big progress on Georgia’s path towards EU membership." "Of course, we have the hope for an accession perspective, but we believe that the path to this goal will lead through hard work and not through disappointment," Janelidze said.

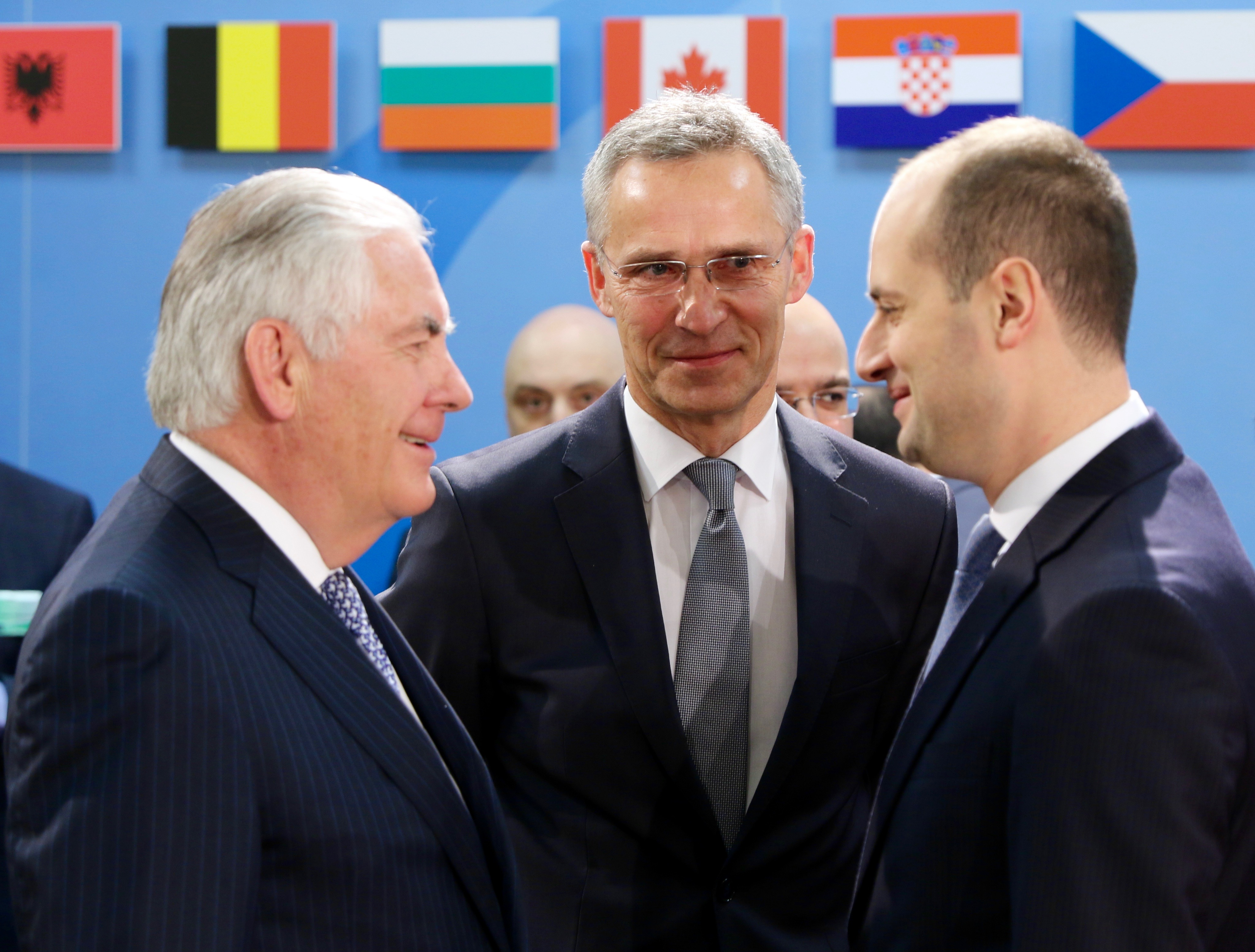
Georgia-NATO Commission meeting in Brussels

Mikheil actively promoted Georgia's membership in NATO. Janelidze participated in the first NATO-Georgia Commission at a NATO Summit in Warsaw in 2016. The commission, held at the level of Foreign Ministers, adopted a joint-statement, which welcomed Georgia’s engagement in strategic discussion on Black Sea security, inauguration of the Defense Institution Building School, holding the first ever NATO-Georgia exercise, open to partners, decided on new steps to intensify the cooperation, to help strengthen Georgia’s defense capabilities, interoperability and resilience capabilities, including increased support for Georgia’s Training and Education, through a possible trust fund project, and Strategic Communications, to provide support to the development of Georgia’s air defense and air surveillance, and also to deepen focus on security in the Black Sea region. It was stated that both the existing and new initiatives aim to strengthen Georgia’s defense and interoperability capabilities with the Alliance and are helping Georgia, an aspirant country, progress in its preparations towards membership. Allies reaffirm all elements of the Bucharest decision, as well as subsequent decisions, welcomed the significant progress realized since 2008, and stated that Georgia’s relationship with the Alliance contains all the practical tools to prepare for eventual membership. Foreign Minister Janelidze reaffirmed Georgia’s determination to achieve NATO membership, as a top foreign policy priority for Georgia. In September 2016, NATO Secretary General Stoltenberg and ambassadors from all NATO Allies visited Georgia and took part in a NATO-Georgia Commission. In December 2017, Janelidze participated in another NATO-Georgia Commission meeting held in Brussels, which was described as "very constructive” by NATO’s Secretary General Jens Stoltenberg. The Secretary General also stated that the implementation of the NATO-Georgia Substantial Package was marking "impressive progress." U.S. Secretary of State Tillerson stated he had a productive discussion with Georgian Foreign Minister Janelidze in the frame of the ministerial. "US strongly supports Georgia’s membership in NATO. We are looking forward to completing all the steps for that to happen", Rex Tillerson said.

=== Georgia-US Strategic Partnership ===
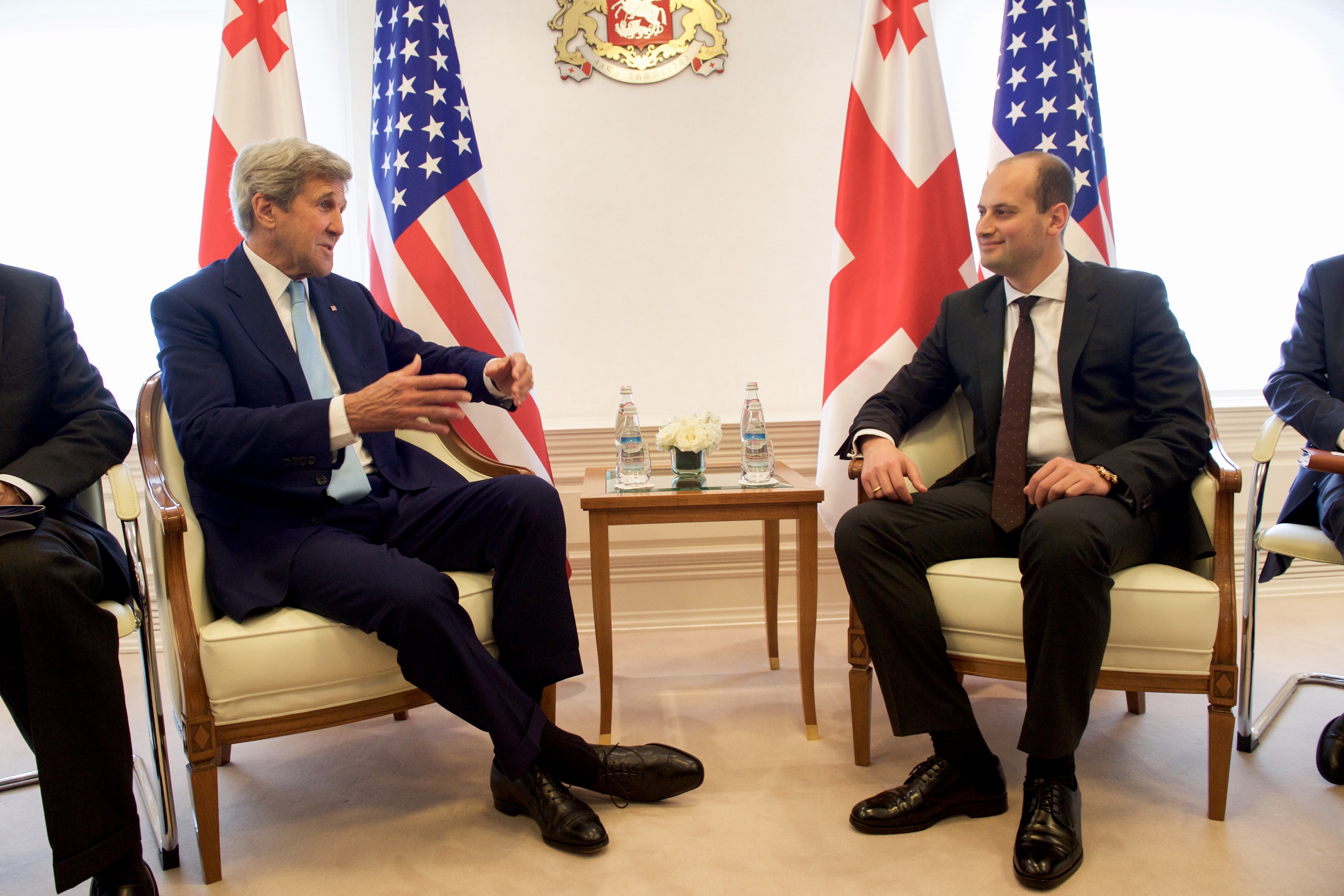
U.S. Secretary of State John Kerry meets Georgian Foreign Minister Janelidze during his visit to Tbilisi.

"Deepening cooperation with the United States, our main strategic partner, is a highly important issue for the government and Foreign Ministry," Janelidze said. In March 2016, Janelidze visited U.S. and met with the U.S. Secretary of State John Kerry. Mikheil had meetings in U.S. congress and with leading U.S. think tanks. In May 2016, the reception dedicated to the 25th anniversary of restoration of Georgia’s independence was hosted by Janelidze in Washington D.C. which was attended by more than 900 guests. The guests were addressed by U.S. Deputy Secretary of State Tony Blinken. In July 2016, Secretary Kerry visited Georgia and signed the new security cooperation agreement with Georgia, to expand U.S.-Georgian security cooperation, giving Georgia access to additional American equipment, training and intelligence with an eye to protecting its borders from future potential encroachment, modernize Georgia’s security forces and allow it to more fully integrate with NATO missions.

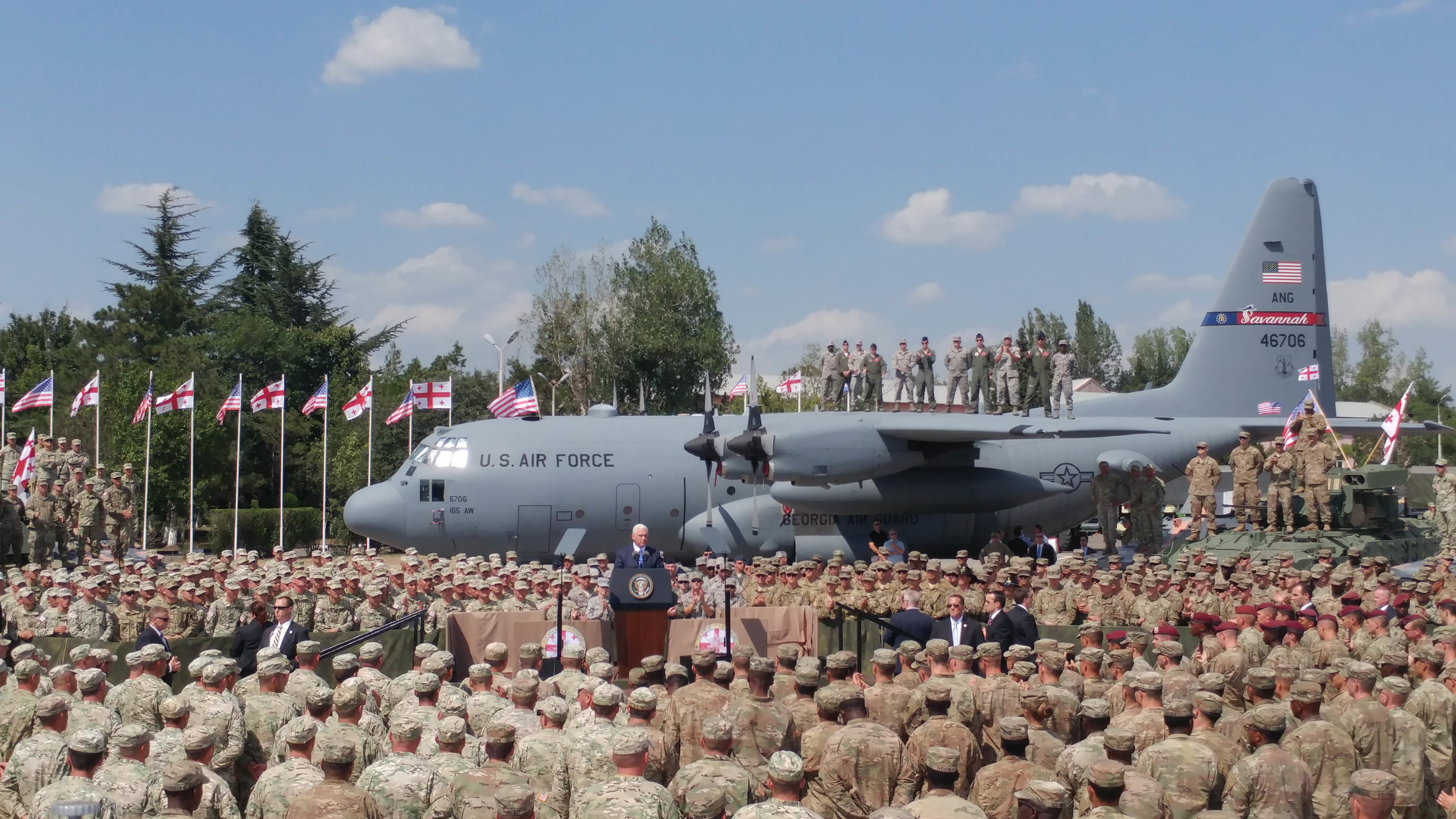
VP Pence visits Georgia during the Noble Partner Drills

Janelidze was among the first foreign ministers to meet with the new U.S. administration after 2016 U.S. presidential elections. In February 2017, at the meeting in DC, a top diplomat of the Trump administration, Tillerson, assured Janelidze in a 'full support' of U.S. in standoff with Russia over breakaway regions. In May 2017, Georgia and U.S. signed a General Security of Information Agreement (GSOIA). "The agreement represents a major milestone in security cooperation between the United States and Georgia," the Department of State said after the signing ceremony. In the same year, Vice President Mike Pence visited Georgia. "Western civilization is a beautiful mosaic of free countries and peoples - each with their own unique histories, cultures, languages and traditions and all of which deserve to be cherished, celebrated, and protected, but in these challenging times, once-distant threats have become local threats to nations and communities across the world, and all free nations must band together to confront and overcome these threats.” - said Vice President. Pence called Georgia a key strategic partner of the United States of America, assured U.S. support to Georgia's territorial integrity and sovereignty, sanctions against Russia, Georgia's NATO membership, praised for economic reforms and stressed importance of the Anaklia deep-sea port project which shows the potential of a stronger bilateral relationship between the nations, as American companies were investing alongside their Georgian counterparts in this multi-billion-dollar project. Janelidze stressed that Pence's visit to Georgia was a confirmation that Georgia is a "firm ally and a strategic partner of the United States."

In 2018, the Vice President Pence welcomed Prime Minister Kvirikashvili and his delegation, including Foreign Minister Janelidze, to the Vice President’s Residence as a follow up to his trip to Georgia. The Vice President congratulated Prime Minister Kvirikashvili on the centennial of the First Democratic Republic of Georgia, reiterated the United States’ steadfast commitment to Georgia’s sovereignty and territorial integrity within its internationally recognized borders, and reaffirmed U.S. support for Georgia’s Euro-Atlantic integration. Both leaders pledged to explore further strengthening their economic and trade relations. Georgia was actively promoting a possible free trade agreement with the U.S.. Foxnews published an op-ed of the Prime Minister of Georgia about the potential benefits of US-Georgia trade deal. During the visit, this issue was discussed with the U.S. Secretary of State Mike Pompeo at the SPC meeting as well.

=== Bilateral relations with European countries ===
Mikheil Janelidze took aim to bring the relations with the western European countries to the strategic level, deepen further cooperation with the Central and Eastern European countries and attract more European companies and investors to the Georgian market.

In December 2016 Foreign Minister Janelidze and the Minister of State for Europe and the Americas Sir Alan Duncan announced that the countries have upgraded bilateral political dialogue to the level of Strategic Partnership. "We are developing not only our bilateral cooperation but our partnership in multilateral formats. We look forward to establishing a strong legal framework after Brexit including developing free trade and trade-economic cooperation”, Minister Janelidze said at the meeting in London with the U.K. Secretary of State Boris Johnson.

Janelidze and Steinmeier, the Foreign Minister of Germany, agreed that there was potential for Georgia and Germany to enhance trade and economic ties and encourage greater inflow of German investments to Georgia during the meeting in Berlin in 2016. The start of the Georgian-German Year, an 18-month-long series of cultural and political events celebrating the 200 years of friendship and 25 years of diplomatic relations between the two countries, were officially announced by Janelidze and German Foreign Minister Sigmar Gabriel at an official reception evening attended by over 500 guests in April 2017. "We’ want to ensure that co-operation between Georgia and Germany grows into deep partnership" – stated Janelidze.

Jean-Marc Ayrault, Minister of Foreign Affairs and International Development, received Minister Janelidze in Paris on 7 February 2017. Addressing the members of the Foreign Affairs Committee of the French National Assembly on 8 February, Janelidze stated that Georgia is the EU’s "main ally in the area of security" and underlined that "having such a democratic and stable ally as Georgia is in the interests of Europe." France and Georgia are launching a high-level dialogue named after Georgian prince Dimitri Amilakhvari - the French Minister of Europe and Foreign Affairs, Jean-Yves Le Drian said at a joint press conference of the foreign ministers of the two countries in Tbilisi on 26 May 2018. The dialogue moved up Georgian-French relations to a qualitatively new level.

Italy's Minister of Foreign Affairs and International Cooperation, Paolo Gentiloni, after his meeting with Janelidze in Tbilisi said that the Government of Georgia has "worked hard" to create beneficial situation for European businesses to invest in the country and stressed that after Georgia signed its Association Agreement (AA) and Deep and Comprehensive Free Trade Area (DCFTA) deal with the European Union (EU), more European business people had shown interest in investing in Georgia.

Spanish Minister of Foreign Affairs and Co-operation Jose Manuel Garcia-Margallo visited Tbilisi on 28–29 February 2016. Janelidze assessed this visit as a strong support of the Spanish Government to Georgia and welcomed the political decision of Spain to open the embassy in Georgia.

Didier Reynders, Deputy Prime Minister and Minister of Foreign Affairs and European Affairs of Belgium hosted Mikheil Janelidze in October 2017. Highlighting the opportunities of further deepening co-operation in the areas of infrastructure, energy and green technologies, the two ministers spoke about the Belgian business delegation’s upcoming visit to Georgia.

Mikheil Janelidze worked intensively with such traditional supporters of Georgia, its European and Euroatlantic integration, as Baltic and Visegrad countries. In the frames of Mikheil Janelidze’s visit to the Republic of Poland, Georgian and Polish Foreign Ministers launched "Tbilisi Conference" - a new format for co-operation between Georgia and Poland, which represents a platform supporting Georgia’s European and Euro-Atlantic integration. Mikheil Janelidze was awarded with the Knight's Cross of the Order of Merit of the Republic of Poland for his outstanding contributions to fostering relations between Poland and Georgia.

=== Relations with Regional Countries ===
Janelidze supported strategic partnerships of Georgia with Azerbaijan and Turkey, including in trilateral format. In 2017, he hosted in Tbilisi the fifth ministerial between Foreign Ministers, where the three officials agreed to intensify trilateral cooperation and develop the region’s energy, transport and Silk Road potential. After holding the meeting, the foreign ministers of Azerbaijan, Georgia and Turkey traveled to southern Georgia where they visited a section of the regional railway link the Baku-Tbilisi-Kars (BTK) hailing it as "historic" and noting its importance for the region in the context of the new Silk Road. In July 2016, an inaugural meeting of the High Level Georgia-Turkey Strategic Cooperation Council was held in Ankara. Janelidze worked on expanding partnership to Central Asia. This issue he discussed in Kazakhstan with his counterpart, Abdrakhmanov, who stated that Kazakhstan attaches "great importance to improving the existing and creating new trade and transport routes and economic corridors that connect the countries of Central Asia, South Caucasus, Europe and the Persian Gulf, as well as maximizing the use of the Trans-Caspian International Transport Route." Mikheil Janelidze was awarded with the State Medal for his special contribution to the development of bilateral relations between Georgia and Kazakhstan by presidential decree of the President of Kazakhstan Nursultan Nazarbayev. During Janelidze's official visit to Turkmenistan on 15 November 2017, Georgian Foreign Minister Mikheil Janelidze, together with Afghan, Turkish, Turkmen and Azerbaijani officials signed a new multimodal transport and transit agreement on the Lapis Lazuli Corridor. "To expand further regional transport and trade ties, connecting the Rasht-Astara railway to the Baku-Tbilisi-Kars line as well as developing a transit corridor to link the Indian Ocean to Europe, first ever quadrilateral meeting of the Foreign Ministers of Azerbaijan, Georgia, Iran and Turkey was held in Baku in 2018. Janelidze promoted Southern Gas Corridor, the Trans-Caspian Gas Pipeline and White Stream Project, to enhance energy cooperation between the Caspian and the Black Sea regions and supply additional energy resources of Caspian Sea to the EU via Black Sea. Mikheil Janelidze was supporting friendly and enhanced cooperation with Armenia, despite Armenia and Georgia being members of different regional integration formats. "Today, among other things, we talked about possibilities to use these differences to strengthen our cooperation and for joint projects”, Janelidze stated during his official visit in Yerevan.

Janelidze promoted enhancement of activities of the regional Organization for Democracy and Economic Development - GUAM, initiated and led the process of elaboration of a vision for the next years of the organization. The Joint Communique was signed by the GUAM Foreign Ministers in Tbilisi in 2018. “This Document is a proof of the unanimous will of the four countries to achieve greater results, through joint efforts, to the common benefit of their people,” - stated Janelidze.

=== Relations with Asia ===
Janelidze paid official visit to Japan. During the visit agreement was reached to simplify visa procedures for Georgian citizens as well as to promote Georgia among Japanese tourists so that the two countries develop close people-to-people connections. Another important agreement the two Ministers reached was to intensify investment cooperation and launch negotiations on a bilateral investment agreement. Japanese Foreign Minister Fumio Kishida said that this will be a positive signal for Japanese business circles to use Georgia’s investment opportunities. In addition, Janelidze explored the opportunities of establishing cooperation with Japan in the field of robotics. Janelidze was promoting economic cooperation with China. He discussed Georgia’s active participation in One belt One road Initiative, signing of free trade agreement between Georgia and China, Georgia’s involvement in the Asian Infrastructure and Investment Bank and other projects with Chairman of the China National Tourism Administration (CNTA) on the sidelines of the 22nd General Assembly of the UN World Tourism Organization (UNWTO). Janelidze promoted enhanced trade-economic cooperation of Georgia with South-East Asia. At the meeting with the Indonesian Industry Minister Airlangga Hartarto in Davos in 2018, Janelidze stated about the Georgia’s priority to further develop trade-economic ties with South-East Asia – "being one of the rapid growing economy in the world. Georgia is interested in the further development of relations with Indonesia – one of the leading states of the region." Agreement was reached to grant 30-day visa-free travel to Georgian citizens to support the process.

=== Multilateral Relations ===
Janelidze set as a priority to raise the role of Georgia in multilateral organizations. In 2017, for the first time in history of Georgia, a Georgian candidate was elected as a head of UN Specialized Agency. During the 22nd Assembly, Zurab Pololikashvili, was elected as a new UNWTO secretary-general. Georgia’s Permanent Representative to United Nations (UN) Kaha Imnadze has been appointed as co-chair of the intergovernmental negotiations on UN Security Council reform. Georgia took leadership on SDG 16, to promote and share experiences on good governance, rule of law and anti-corruption policies on a multilateral level. Janelidze hosted and delivered a speech at the 16+ Forum Inaugural Annual Showcase "From Words to Action: Implementing SDG 16+ at the local and national level" held in Tbilisi, Georgia, with 150 representatives from 25 countries. In 2017, Georgia took the chairmanship of the Open Government Partnership (OPG), the multilateral initiative uniting 75 nations to strengthen governance. "This year we took a huge responsibility through taking the chairmanship of the Open Government Partnership (OPG). Taking the role is the biggest recognition of Georgia’s success for ensuring open, transparent governance and providing electronic governance," - Janelidze stated.

=== Cultural Diplomacy ===
Cultural diplomacy was actively used to raise awareness about Georgia in the world. In 2016 Qvevri, a large, ancient Georgian winemaking vessel was placed in the courtyard of the United Nations (UN) Geneva office to mark the organisation’s 70th anniversary. 2017 was declared the year of Georgia in Bordeaux, France, due to the fact that Georgia is not only the winemaking country, but also possesses the ancient winemaking tradition. The French city itself is considered to be the center of wine civilization. A piece of the relics of holy Great Martyr Queen Ketevan arrived in Tbilisi from India. In more than 50 countries the 25th anniversary of establishment of diplomatic relations was celebrated with cultural events.

In 2018, 100 years of Georgia's first Democratic Republic was celebrated in Georgia and around the world. More than 100 cultural activities, a scientific conference, photo exhibitions and lectures were held in different countries. Janelidze announced about the plans to open Georgia’s diplomatic museum and present interesting exhibitions from Georgia’s diplomatic history to the public. The 100th anniversary of the Ivane Javakhishvili Tbilisi State University (TSU) was celebrated in association with UNESCO. Janelidze delivered a speech at the ceremony underlining the importance of TSU in building Georgian democracy and the need to rethink the current education system to catch up with the Fourth Industrial Revolution. Janelidze spoke at the roundtable conference titled “Cooperation for Prosperity – a Strategy for Future Centennial” together with 20 high-level delegations, including the Presidents of Armenia, Finland, Latvia, Lithuania, Poland, Slovakia and the European Commission.

== Non-Governmental Activities ==
Since Spring 2019 Mikheil Janelidze is a chairman of Center for European Governance & Economy (CEGE). The center is a non-profit, non-partisan, public policy institute, with a mission to promote free, democratic, peaceful and economically vibrant Eastern Europe and its integration with the European Union. In 2019 CEGE has initiated and co-organized together with the EU Commission and Government of Georgia the First Eastern Partnership Investment Forum in Batumi. The Forum created an opportunity to discuss the impact of the Eastern Partnership Program of the European Union on the investment environment of the six partner countries (Armenia, Azerbaijan, Belarus, Georgia, Moldova, Ukraine ) after ten years of its implementation, with the primary focus to promote European investments into the EaP countries. More than 400 participants, ministers from EaP Countries, the high-level EU officials, as well as business leaders, business organizations, international organizations, donors, international financial institutions and media, both from the EaP Countries and the EU Member States, participated in the forum.

== Awards ==
In 2011, Janelidze was awarded with the Order of Honor for his contributions to the foreign trade policy development of Georgia by the decree of the President of Georgia.

In 2018, Janelidze was awarded with the State Medal for his special contribution to the development of bilateral relations between Georgia and Kazakhstan by the decree of the President of Kazakhstan.

In 2018, Janelidze was awarded with the Knight's Cross of the Order of Merit of the Republic of Poland for his outstanding contributions to fostering relations between Poland and Georgia by the decree of the President of Poland.

== Personal life ==
Mikheil Janelidze is married and has a daughter.

== See also ==
- List of foreign ministers in 2017
- List of current foreign ministers

Political offices
Preceded by Giorgi Kvirikashvili	Minister of Foreign Affairs; 2015–2018	Succeeded by David Zalkaliani
