= Temur Iakobashvili =

Georgian diplomat and politician

Temur Iakobashvili თემურ იაკობაშვილი
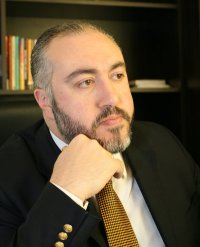

Ambassador of Georgia to the United States
- In office 18 November 2010 – 8 November 2013
- President: Mikheil Saakashvili
- Succeeded by: Archil Gegeshidze

State Minister for Reintegration
- In office 31 January 2008 – 20 November 2010
- Preceded by: David Bakradze (as State Minister for Conflicts Resolution issues)
- Succeeded by: Ekaterine Tkeshelashvili

Personal details
- Born: 3 September 1967 (age 58) Tbilisi, Georgia

Temur Yakobashvili (Georgian: თემურ იაკობაშვილი, also transliterated as Temur Iakobashvili) (born 3 September 1967) is a Georgian political scientist, diplomat, and politician, serving as State Minister for Reintegration since 2008; he was named Deputy Prime Minister in 2009. On 20 November 2010 his nomination as Ambassador to the United States was announced. After change of government in Georgia he resigned on 8 November 2013.

== Personal life ==
Yakobashvili was born into a Georgian Jewish family in Tbilisi. He graduated from the Department of Physics at Tbilisi State University in 1984. He attended diplomatic courses at the universities of Oxford and Birmingham (1998), the Yale University World Fellows Program (2002), and the Harvard University John F. Kennedy School of Government (2003). He is married to Yana Fremer and has two children, Giorgi Fremer and Miriam Yakobashvili. He speaks Georgian, Russian, Hebrew, and English.

== Professional career ==
From 1990 to 2001, he worked for the Ministry of Foreign Affairs of Georgia, where he last served as the director of the U.S., Canada and Latin America Department. He is a co-founder of, and from 2001 to 2008 was executive vice-president of, the Georgian Foundation for Strategic and International Studies, the largest think tank in the South Caucasus. He is also a co-founder and member of the boards of the Georgian Council on Foreign Relations and the Atlantic Council of Georgia, and a member of the board of the Georgian Institute of Public Affairs. He has authored several publications on national security, conflict management, and foreign relations.

On 31 January 2008 he was appointed by the President of Georgia Mikheil Saakashvili as State Minister of Georgia for Reintegration. He is the architect of Georgia's strategy of engagement with the Russian-occupied regions of Abkhazia and South Ossetia, which aims to "promote interaction among the divided populations of Georgia, currently separated by occupation lines."

On 20 November 2010 his nomination as Ambassador to the United States was announced. In February 2012, he was awarded the Presidential Order of Excellence.

The victory of the "Georgian dream" at the parliamentary elections in Georgia on 1 October 2012 and the formation of a new government under Bidzina Ivanishvili on 25 October led to changes of the diplomatic staff. So ambassador Yakobashvili took the consequences and announced his resignation on 8 November. As president Mikheil Saakashvili hesitated with approval of new ambassadors, suggested by the new government, it lasted until March 2013 that the successor for Yakobashvili, Archil Gegeshidze, had been appointed.
