= MEGOBARI Act =

Proposed US federal law

- Other short titles: MEGOBARI Act
- Long title: An Act to counter the influence of the Chinese Communist Party, the Iranian Regime, and the Russian Federation in the nation of Georgia.
- Announced in: the 119th United States Congress
- Sponsored by: Joe Wilson (R‑SC)
- Number of co-sponsors: 18

Legislative history
- Introduced in the 119th United States Congress by Joe Wilson (R–SC) on January 3, 2025; Passed the House on May 5, 2025 (349–42)

The MEGOBARI Act (short for Mobilizing and Enhancing Georgia's Options for Building Accountability, Resilience, and Independence Act) is a proposed United States federal law introduced by bipartisan members of Congress, (Note: Joe Wilson (R‑SC), Steve Cohen (D‑TN), Richard Hudson (R‑NC) Marc Veasey (D‑TX).) including U.S. Helsinki Commission Chairman Rep. Joe Wilson. The stated aims of the legislation are to strengthen democratic practices, human rights, and the rule of law in the country of Georgia while countering authoritarian influences, particularly from Russia, as well as China and Iran.

The bill's name, "MEGOBARI", meaning "friend" in Georgian (Georgian: მეგობარი, romanized: megobari), aims to describe "a strong partnership between the United States and the Georgian people". Chairman Wilson stated that the act "reflects the US commitment to supporting Georgia's Euro-Atlantic aspirations and ensuring government accountability to its citizens and democratic principles". The act encompasses various measures, including sanctions against the Georgian officials, for supposedly stalling the country's integration into the European Union and instead aligning with Russia, China and Iran. The bill passed the House of Representatives on May 6, 2025, but is since reported to have been stalled in the US Senate.

== Background ==
This bill is a legislative response to Georgia's adoption of the "Russian-style" foreign agents law ("On Transparency of Foreign Influence"), the mass protests that followed in May 2024, the disputed 2024 parliamentary elections and the 2025 mass protests and crackdowns. The proposed bill calls for a comprehensive review of U.S.-Georgia relations, support for the "Georgian people's pro-Western aspirations", and accountability for individuals involved in "anti-democratic actions in the country, including members of the ruling Georgian Dream party".

The bill was initially introduced on May 24, 2024, during the 118th United States Congress, and was later reintroduced on January 3, 2025, in the 119th Congress.

== Provisions ==
The bill introduced to the House in May 2025

If the bill is passed, the U.S. Secretary of State, in consultation with relevant government agencies, will have 60 days to identify individuals in the Georgian government, its affiliates, or those with significant influence over its actions who are materially responsible for "undermining democracy, human rights, or security in Georgia". Sanctions against such individuals could include measures under the Global Magnitsky Human Rights Accountability Act, as well as those authorized by the Consolidated Appropriations Act of 2023. Visa bans may also be applied to the individuals and their families. The focus will be on those involved in the advocacy, passage, or enforcement of the "Russian-style foreign agent legislation", or those in leadership roles who "promote such laws or suppress lawful opposition". The secretary of state is required to report to Congress within 90 days, providing an unclassified summary for public release.

The bill also mandates a report on improper influence and sanctions evasion in Georgia, to be prepared within 60 days by the secretary of state in coordination with the treasury secretary. This report will analyze corruption and elite networks that serve Russian interests, knowingly or otherwise, as well as Georgia's role in enabling the evasion of international sanctions against Russia. A separate report on Russian intelligence penetration in Georgia, including potential intersections with Chinese influence, is also required within 90 days.

"To strengthen democratic processes", the bill tasks the secretary of state and USAID with establishing a "democracy monitoring task force" to assess and promote a fair pre-election environment in Georgia. Further U.S. support will depend on certification by the president or secretary of state that Georgia has made significant and sustained democratic progress, evidenced by fair elections and balanced pre-election conditions. Upon certification, the U.S. Trade Representative may begin negotiations for a preferential trade regime. Additionally, the U.S. will enhance academic exchanges, visa liberalization, and economic modernization efforts, coordinated with international partners. In terms of security, the president, in consultation with the secretary of defense, will prepare a package of defense equipment and support tailored to counter Russian aggression, ensuring Georgia's territorial defense capabilities are strengthened. This bill reflects a comprehensive effort to "support Georgia's democratic development and counter authoritarian influences".

== Georgian government response ==
The Georgian government criticized the bill, calling it a US interference in the Georgian foreign policy and a "blackmail, intimidation". It stated that it would not change its foreign policy to appease the authors of the bill because it believed this would undermine Georgia's sovereignty. Prime Minister Irakli Kobakhidze stated that the passage of the bill could harm Georgia-U.S. relations. Additionally, the government denounced protests as being directed by American organisations attempting to create "revolutionary processes" in Georgia.

The Parliament of Georgia (Note: As result of the 2024 Georgian parliamentary election and the subsequent constitutional crisis, key political positions and the legitimacy of Georgia's parliament have been disputed. Opposition forces have contested the legitimacy of Mikheil Kavelashvili, and the outgoing president Salome Zourabichvili has claimed to continue to be legitimate president. Also, international platforms have disputed the legitimacy of the de facto Georgian authorities after the 2024 elections, including the European Parliament.) issued a statement on May 14, 2025, condemning the U.S. House of Representatives' adoption of the "so-called MEGOBARI Act" on May 5, 2025, calling it "deeply hostile toward the Georgian state, people, and elected authorities". The statement rejects the Act's three main claims: that Georgia is experiencing democratic backsliding, obstructing Euro-Atlantic integration, and forming inappropriate ties with Russia, China, and Iran, dismissing them as false. It also criticizes the Act as biased, factually inaccurate, and logically flawed, but adds that Georgia will still respond to its accusations with facts.

== Current status ==
On May 6, 2025, the MEGOBARI act passed the House of Representatives, but has since faced notable opposition in the US Senate from Markwayne Mullin, who succeeded in having it stripped from the National Defense Authorization Act in August 2025, leaving its path forward uncertain.

== See also ==
- 2023–2024 Georgian protests
- 2024–2026 Georgian protests
- 2024–2026 Georgian political crisis
- Georgia–United States relations
