= Alexander Rondeli =

Georgian political scientist (1942–2015)

Alexander "Alex" Rondeli (Georgian: ალექსანდრე რონდელი; 7 January 1942 – 12 June 2015) was a Georgian political scientist and one of the country's leading specialists in international affairs who founded and led the think-tank Georgian Foundation for Strategic and International Studies from 1998 until his death in 2015.

Rondeli was born in 1942. He graduated from the Faculty of Oriental Studies at Tbilisi State University and obtained a doctorate in 1974. He went on an exchange program to the London School of Economics and Political Science as a research fellow from 1976 to 1977. He was also a mid-career fellow at the Woodrow Wilson School, Princeton University (1993–94), a visiting professor at Emory University (1991), Mount Holyoke College (1995), and Williams College (1992, 1995, and 1997). He chaired the Department of International Relations at Tbilisi State University from 1991 to 1996 and directed Foreign Policy Research and Analysis Center at the Ministry of Foreign Affairs of Georgia from 1997 to 2001. He held a diplomatic rank of an ambassador extraordinary and plenipotentiary. In 1998 he became a founding member and president of an independent, non-profit policy think-tank, the Georgian Foundation for Strategic and International Studies, which has a declared aim of "helping improve public policy decision-making in Georgia through research and analysis, training of policymakers and policy analysts, and public education about the strategic issues". Rondeli was a frequent commentator on the politics and international relations of Georgia and authored many books, articles, and op-eds. two books, International Relations and The Small State in the International System, both in Georgian, are standard texts in Georgian higher education. He was an advocate of Georgia's Euro-Atlantic orientation, which he saw as the only option for the country to become a viable democracy. He died in 2015, aged 73.
