= Georgia–United States relations =

- Georgia: United States

Diplomatic mission
- Embassy of Georgia, Washington, D.C.: Embassy of the United States, Tbilisi

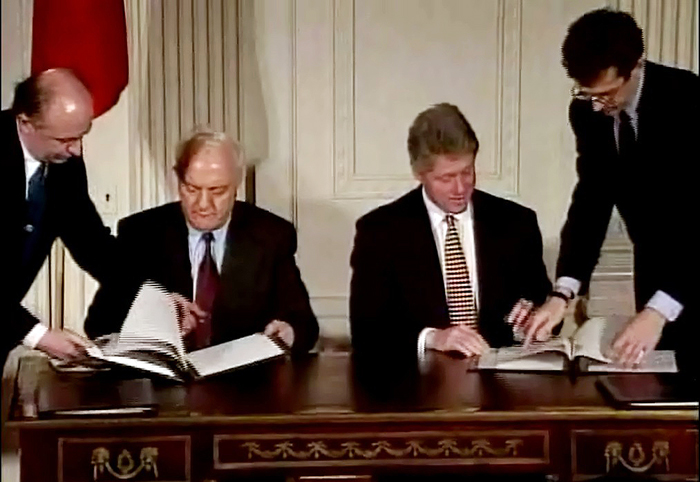
Former Soviet Foreign Minister and then President of Georgia Eduard Shevardnadze signing the 1995 Georgian-American Investment Treaty with President Clinton

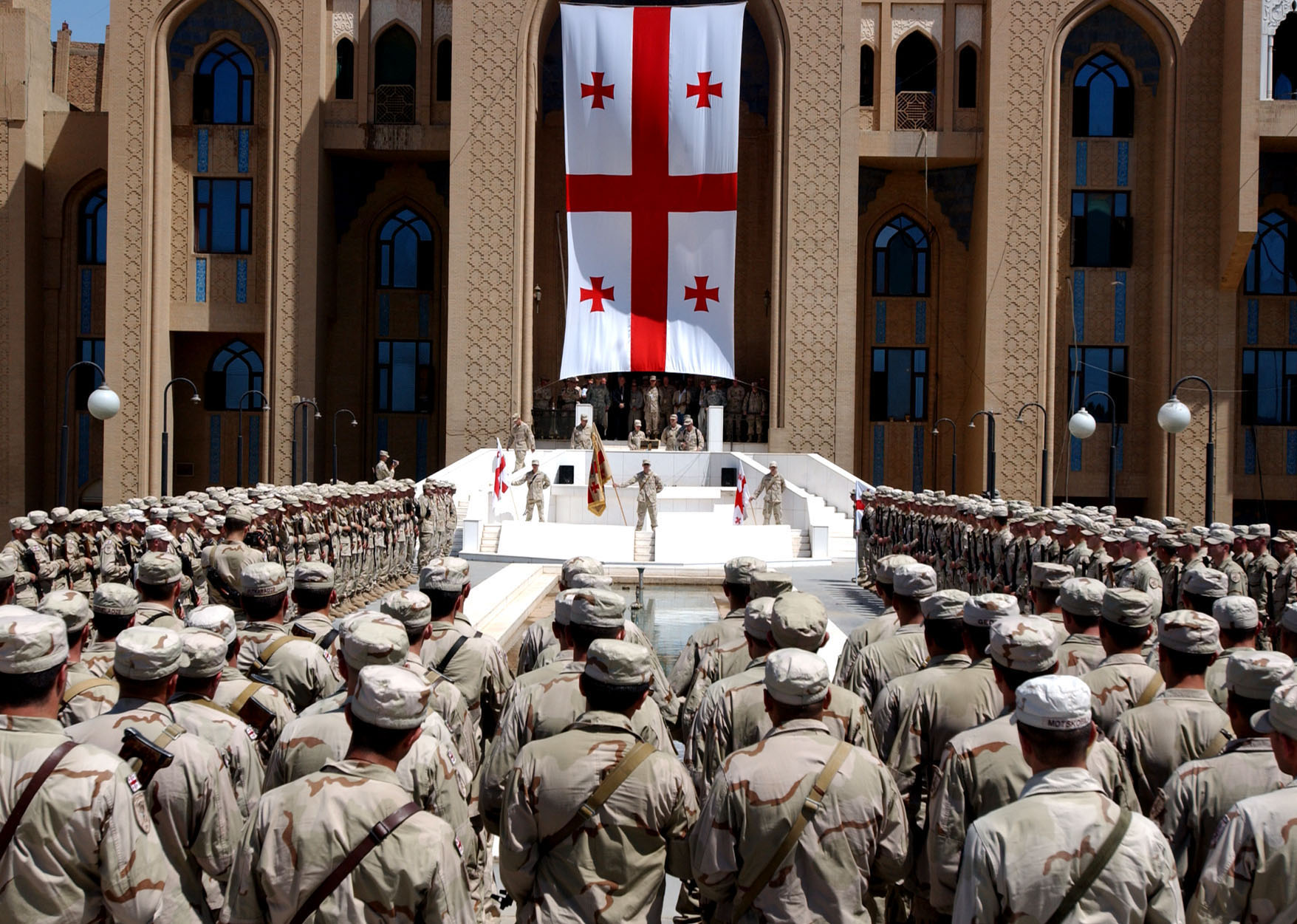
Georgian troops celebrate their independence day in Baghdad in 2006

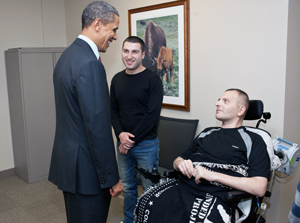
President Obama visiting a Georgian soldier, Alexandre Tugushi, who was wounded in Afghanistan.

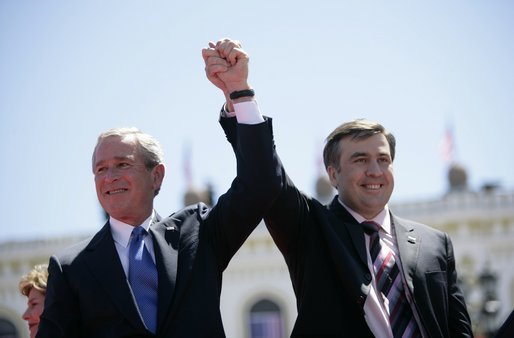
President Bush's 2005 address to more than 100,000 at Freedom Square marked a new stage in Georgian-American relations

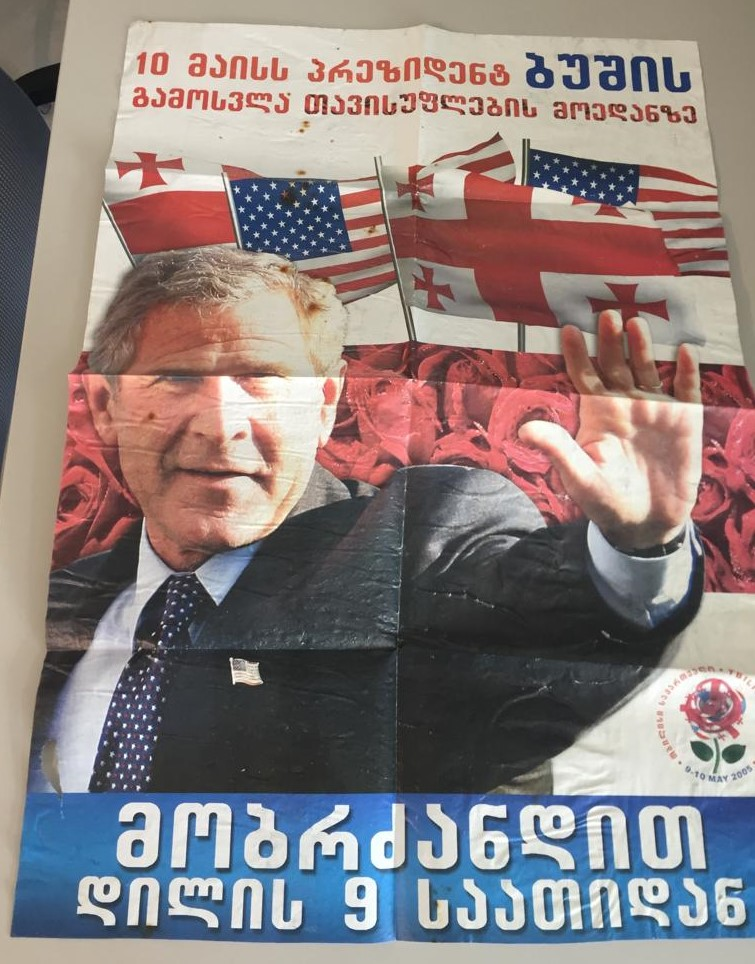
Bush poster at Tbilisi (May 2005)

Diplomatic relations between the countries of Georgia and the United States started on 24 March 1992 and encompass multiple areas of bilateral cooperation. One of the key U.S. allies in Eastern Europe, Georgia was the third largest troop contributor in the Iraq War and the largest per-capita contributor to the U.S. led mission in Afghanistan. The United States for its part is actively assisting Georgia in strengthening its state institutions in face of increasing pressure from its northern neighbor Russia and has provided the country with financial assistance in excess of three billion dollars since 1991. Since 2009, Georgian–American relations are streamlined by the U.S.–Georgia Charter on Strategic Partnership, which created four bilateral working groups on priority areas of democracy; defense and security; economic, trade, energy issues, people-to-people and cultural exchanges.

Since the early 2000s, Georgia has sought to become a member of NATO with U.S. support; however, Georgia's membership was delayed indefinitely, along with that of Ukraine, due to strong Russian opposition. In February 2012, it was agreed that the U.S. and Georgia will start working on a Free Trade Agreement which, if materialized, will make Georgia the only European country to have such treaty with the United States. American citizens visiting Georgia currently do not require a visa for entry. Citizens will receive a 90-day tourist visa at the country's entry points.

== Georgian-American cooperation on development ==
The United States works closely with Georgia to promote mutual security, counterterrorism interests and provides Georgia with bilateral security assistance, including English-language and military professional training, through the International Military Education and Training (IMET) program.

The multi-year Georgia Train and Equip Program (GTEP) ended in 2004, achieving its intended goals of enhancing Georgia's military capability and stimulating military reform. Launched in January 2005, the Georgia Sustainment and Stability Operations Program has advanced GTEP's goals and trained the Georgian contingent participating in coalition operations in Iraq. Partnership with the Georgia (U.S.) National Guard, visits by the Sixth Fleet, the Coast Guard to Georgia, and the Bilateral Working Group on Defense and Military Cooperation are also important components of American security relationship with Georgia.

Promoting democracy and reform is another strategic pillar of America's bilateral relationship with Georgia. In April 2006, as part of these reforms Georgia passed a strong anti-human trafficking law and has since then ranked consistently among Tier 1 countries of the State Department's report on trafficking in persons, meaning that the country now fully complies with the minimum standards for the elimination of trafficking.

Georgia hosts 90 Peace Corps Volunteers who work in English Language Education and NGO Development.

== History ==
=== The Iraq War ===
In a sign of Georgia's increased shift away from Russia and towards the West in the early 2000s, the country committed significant number of troops to U.S.-led coalition in Iraq, after wrapping up a smaller operation in the American-led peacekeeping mission in the war-torn Balkans. Georgia's contingent in Iraq originally consisted of 300 special forces troops under U.S. command in Baqouba, who guarded two bridges and three American Forward Operating Bases. 550 more troops were deployed in June 2005, which were placed under U.S. command on a dangerous 'Middle Ring Security' mission in the Green Zone.

In 2007, Georgia brought the total number of its troops in Iraq to 2000, becoming the third largest troop contributor after the U.S. and the United Kingdom. The troops, all of whom had been trained by American instructors, were based east of Baghdad, close to the border with Iran.

During the outbreak of war between Georgia and Russia on August 8, 2008, Georgia was forced to pull its entire 2,000-strong contingent from Iraq to provide assistance back home. At the time of the withdrawal, five Georgian soldiers had died in Iraq and 19 were wounded.

=== War in Afghanistan ===
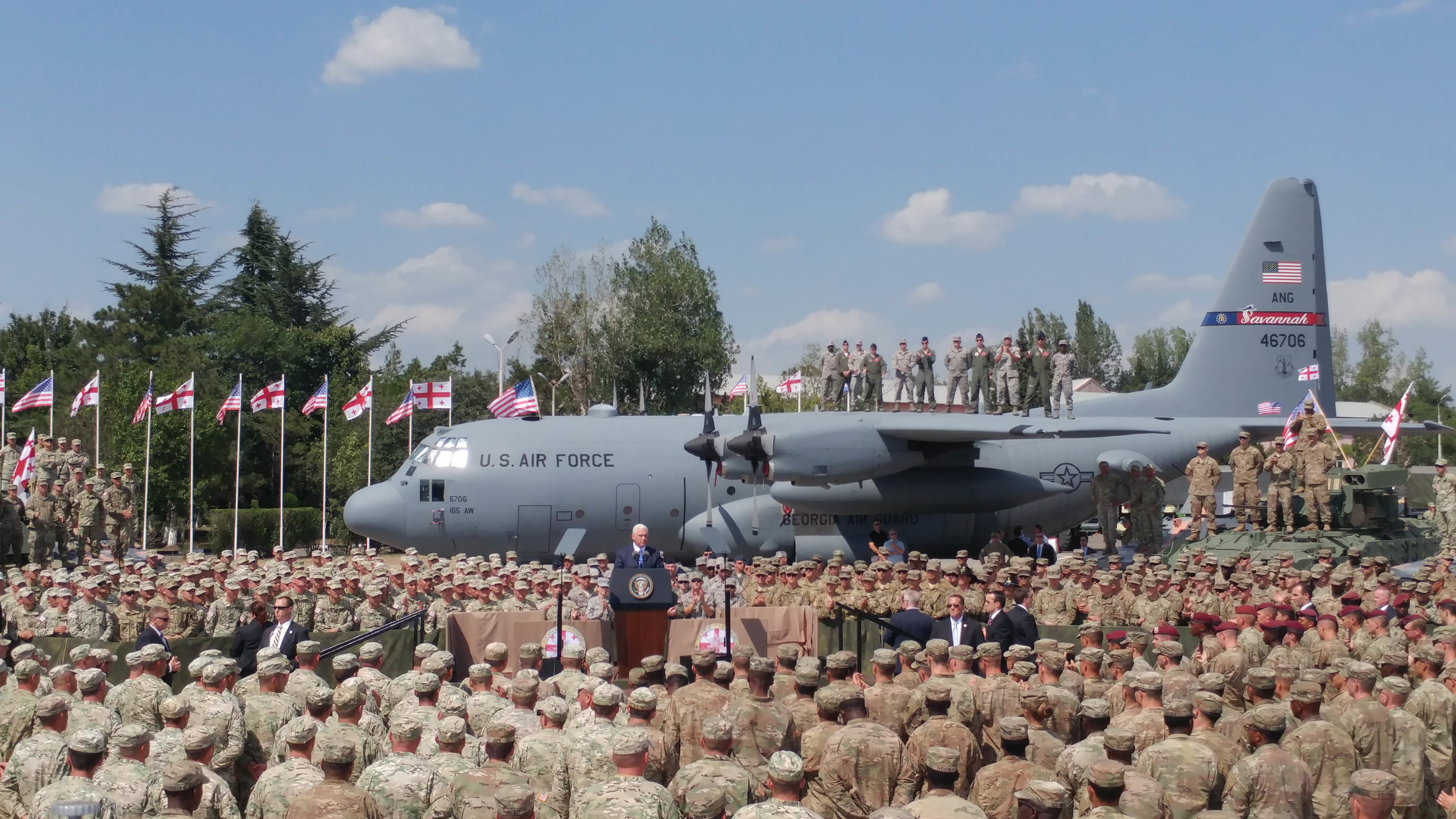
U.S. Vice President Mike Pence addressing American troops in Georgia following joint military drills. The exercises were of particular symbolic importance as troops from the country of Georgia trained with their counterparts from the U.S. State of Georgia.

Georgia maintained up to 1600 soldiers in the U.S.-led mission in Afghanistan, making it the largest per-capita contributor in the mission and the largest non-NATO contributor to the war effort, after overtaking Australia in 2012. The country lost 32 soldiers in Afghanistan and more than 270 were wounded. The most recent death occurred in August 2017.

Following the defeat of Georgia's ruling UNM Coalition in the Georgian parliamentary elections of 2012, the new governing coalition promised the United States to remain in Afghanistan. Georgia ultimately maintained a presence in Afghanistan until the end of the conflict, with the last deployed unit returning to Georgia on June 28, 2021.

Domestic opposition to Georgia's deployment in Afghanistan remained virtually non-existent despite Georgian casualties. This may be attributed to the fact that both U.S. and Georgian governments promoted the Afghan involvement as one of the building blocks of Georgia's NATO membership, which has failed to materialize in recent years due to Russian resistance to these efforts.

=== South Ossetia conflict ===
Much like its Western allies, the United States condemned Russia's intrusion into Georgia's sovereign territory and while it abstained from direct military action, Washington used military aircraft and naval forces to deliver aid to Georgia to signal its strong support. Following the war, at the advice of Vice President Joseph Biden the U.S. appropriated one billion dollars to help Georgia rebuild.

On January 9, 2009, the U.S. Secretary of State Condoleezza Rice and Georgian Foreign Minister Grigol Vashadze signed a Charter on Strategic Partnership, a nonbinding document outlining areas of cooperation and reiterating the U.S. support for Georgia's territorial integrity and to Georgia's NATO membership.

Following U.S. President Barack Obama's meeting with Dmitry Medvedev in 2009, there were worries in Georgia and among its supporters in the U.S. that the Georgian-American relations would suffer as a result of attempts to repair Russian–American relations. However, the White House stated that the administration will continue to support Georgia.

According to the 2012 U.S. Global Leadership Report, 51% of Georgians approve of U.S. leadership, with 15% disapproving and 34% uncertain.

In February 2014, Georgian Premier Irakli Garibashvili met with U.S. Secretary of State John Kerry to discuss Georgia's future as well as recent developments in Ukraine.

In his 2020 book A Promised Land, Barack Obama post-presidency discussed the Georgia invasion by Russia, also explaining personally that "Medvedev's rebuttal on Georgia reminded me that he was no Boy Scout." Obama argued, as is the position on Ukraine in the UN, that the invasion and continued occupation of Georgia by Russian Federation violated Georgia's sovereignty and international law.

=== American sanctions on Georgian officials ===
On April 5, 2023, the U.S. State Department imposed visa restrictions on Georgian court chairmen and members of the High Council of Justice of Georgia under Section 7031(c) of the Department of State, Foreign Operations, and Related Programs Appropriations Act, 2023, barring them and their immediate family members from entering the U.S. The United States alleged involvement in "significant corruption" and referred to it as the "main challenge to the Georgian justice system". The Georgian officials condemned the decision, while local opposition supported the decision by calling the President to convene special session. The judges criticized it as an attempt to subjugate the Georgian court system to foreign control. According to Archil Talakvadze, the Vice Speaker in the Georgian Parliament, "It is regrettable our friendship and strategic relations have reached the point where we speak to each other in the language of sanctions".

On May 24, 2024, the US announced it was reevaluating its cooperation with Georgia due to the "foreign agent" law that sparked the mass protests in the country. US Secretary of State Antony Blinken announced visa restrictions for certain individuals linked to "undermining democracy in Georgia", believed to be associated with the ruling Georgian Dream party, which criticized the US decision, labeling it as "comical" and accusing Washington of threats and blackmail to limit Georgia's independence.

In response to the Georgian government's suspension of the EU integration process in November 2024, which was accompanied by the opposition protests, the United States denounced the government's conduct, stating that it "violated the democratic ideals and used excessive police force against nonviolent protestors". The U.S. stopped the bilateral Strategic Partnership in response to these "anti-democratic actions", which included "laws that restricted the right to assemble and express oneself". The United States has urged Georgian officials to "recommit to Georgia's Euro-Atlantic path, remove restrictive laws, and reinvestigate election irregularities".

In December 2024, the United States Department of State imposed sanctions on Bidzina Ivanishvili, the founder and honorary chairman of Georgia's ruling Georgian Dream party, under Executive Order 14024. The sanctions were implemented in response to actions deemed to "undermine Georgia's democratic institutions and Euro-Atlantic integration efforts for the benefit of the Russian Federation". The U.S. government cited Ivanishvili's role in "eroding democratic processes, enabling human rights violations, and restricting fundamental freedoms in Georgia". Of particular concern was the Georgian Dream party's alleged "violent suppression of protesters, journalists, activists, and opposition figures" under Ivanishvili's leadership.

=== Second Trump administration ===
In November 2024, the Georgian government welcomed the election of Donald Trump to the presidency of the United States, hoping that the new administration would promote peace in the context of the ongoing Russo-Ukrainian War and that the Georgia-US relations would be "restarted". In February 2025, Georgia became the only co-sponsor of the United States Resolution on the war in Ukraine in the UN General Assembly supporting the conflict resolution efforts amid the United States–Russia peace talks in Saudi Arabia.

As of 2025, the once strong Georgia–United States relations have strained due to the ongoing threats and undermining of democracy in Georgia. The United States has long warned against the growing influence of Iran, China and Russia in Georgia. The United States Congress in a bipartisan effort, is pushing for passage of the MEGOBARI Act. Its supporters say the bill if passed will aim to influence democratic practices, human rights, and the rule of law in Georgia. The primary actions of this bill would impose US sanctions, visa bans and asset freezes on Georgian officials who are deemed responsible for the corrupt, repressive, and fraudulent actions of the government. The Georgian government and Georgian Dream condemned the MEGOBARI Act and called it "hostile" and harmful act against the Georgian people.

== Resident diplomatic missions ==
- Georgia has an embassy in Washington, D.C., and consulates-general in New York City and San Francisco.
- United States has an embassy in Tbilisi.
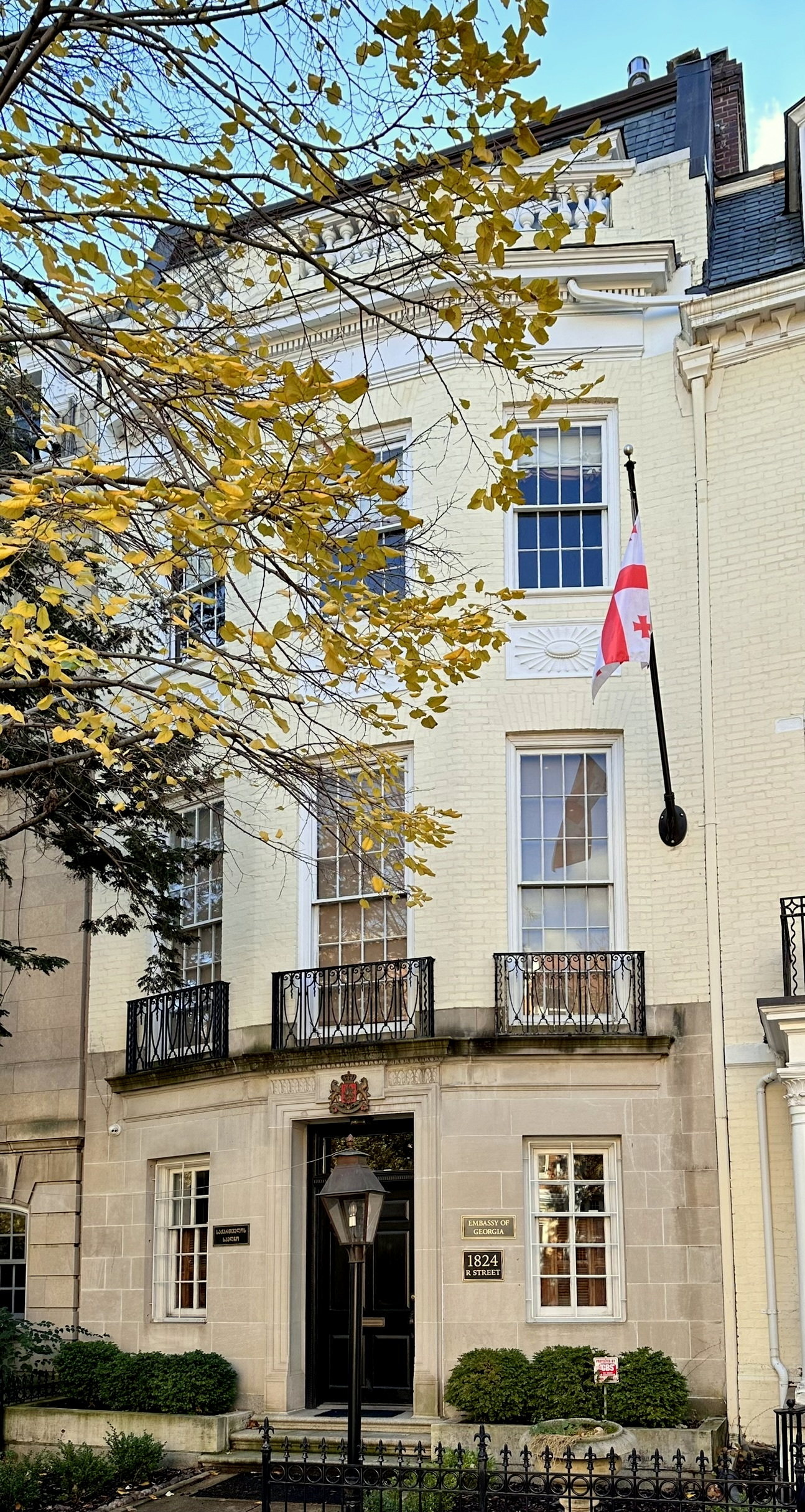
Embassy of Georgia, Washington, D.C.

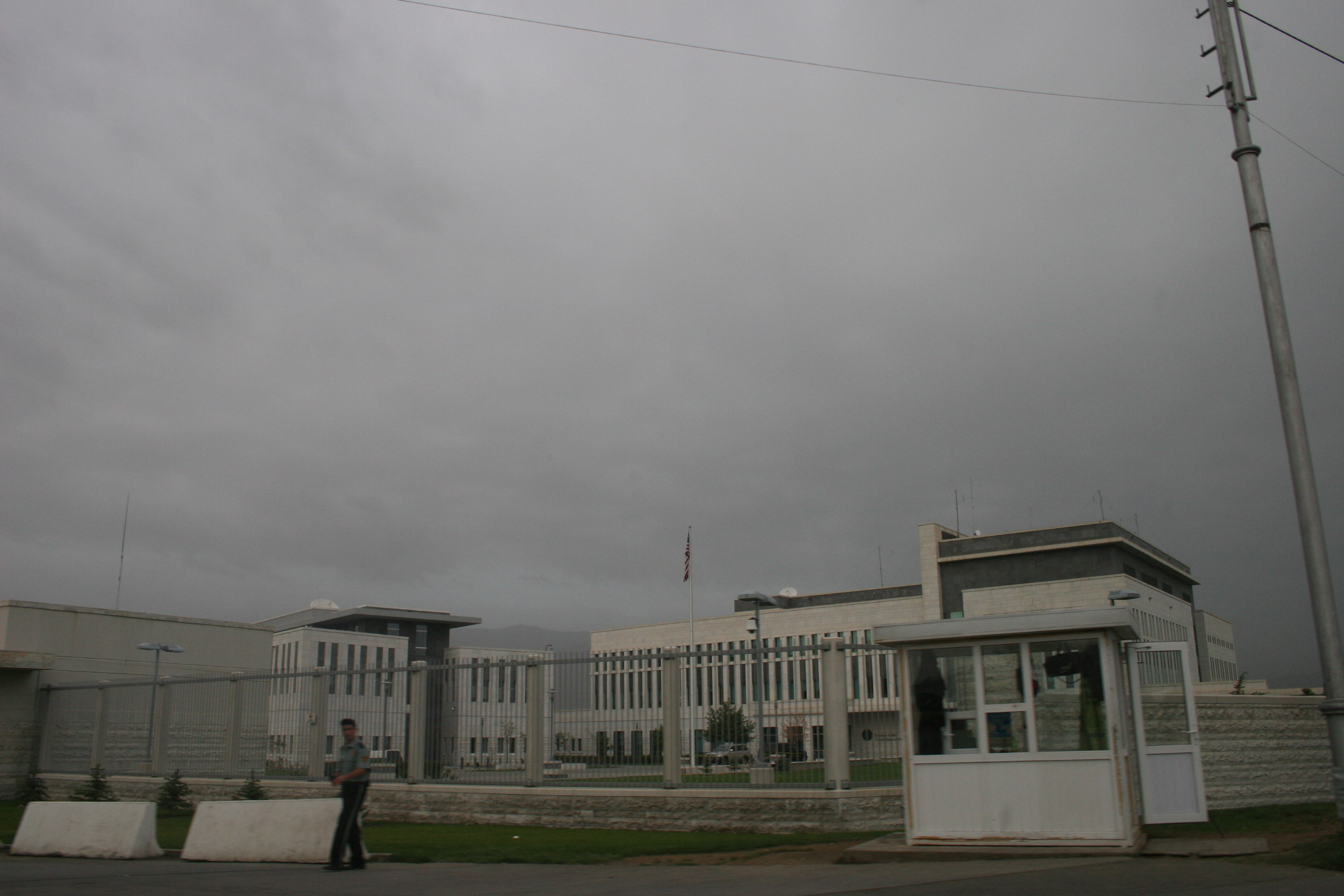
Embassy of the United States, Tbilisi

== See also ==
- Georgian Americans
- Foreign relations of the United States
- Foreign relations of Georgia (country)
- Bush Doctrine
- MEGOBARI Act
- Georgia–NATO relations
