= Batu Kutelia =

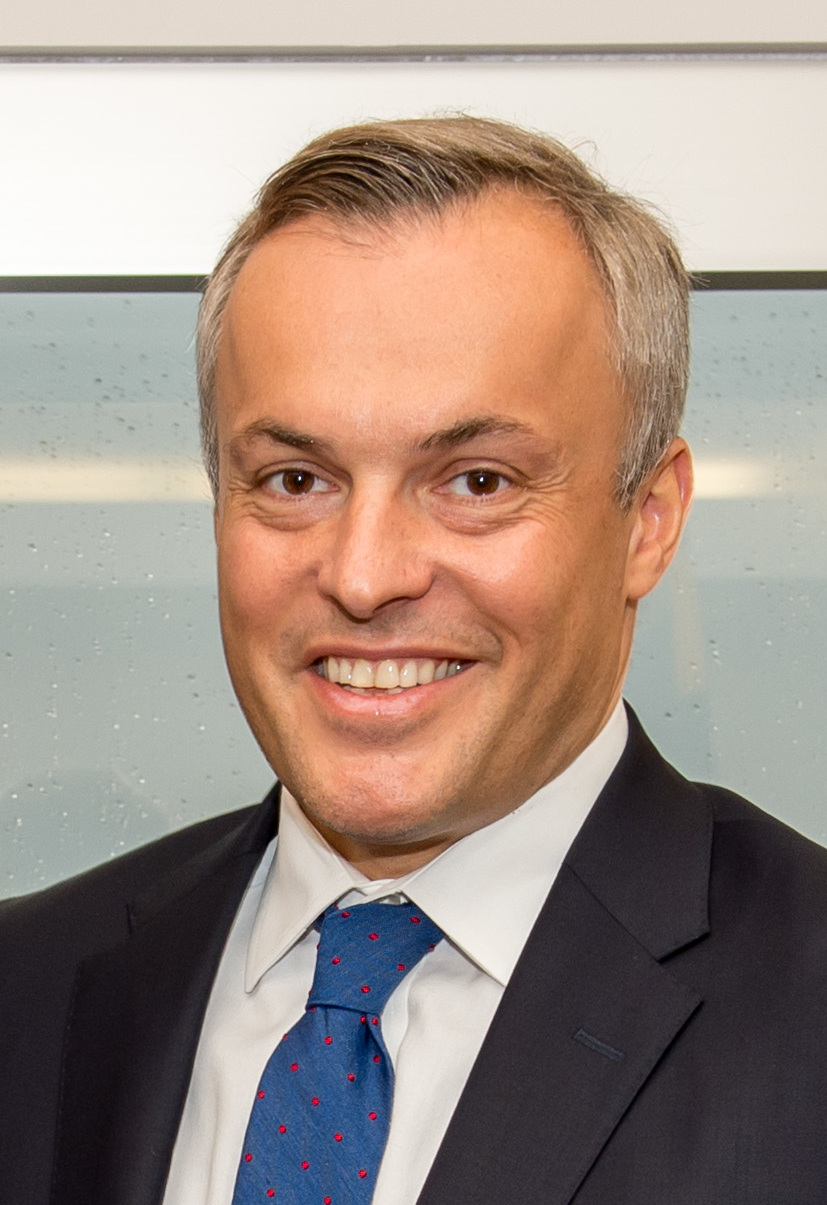
Image of Batu Kutelia

Batu Kutelia is a Georgian politician, diplomat and political analyst.

== Political career ==
He served as Ambassador of Georgia to the United States from January 2011 till November 2013. Previously, he had served as first deputy of the Minister of Defence of Georgia, also during the 2008 Russo-Georgian War. In his earlier career, he served in various functions in security and diplomacy, including as head of Georgia Foreign Intelligence Service. On 22 May 2021, Kutelia co-founded Droa alongside Elene Khoshtaria and others.

== Business career ==
He is a frequent commentator on national and international media, and currently is Senior Fellow at the Foreign Policy Research Institute, and a board member of the Atlantic Council of Georgia. He has consistently argued for Georgia's westward integration.

== Personal life ==
By training, Batu Kutelia is a physicist. He also holds a degree in public administration.
