= Tamar Taliashvili =

Georgian politician

- თამარ ტალიაშვილი

Georgian Ambassador to the United States
- Incumbent
- Assumed office 10 June 2025
- Prime Minister: Irakli Kobakhidze
- Preceded by: David Zalkaliani

Member of the Parliament of Georgia
- In office 11 December 2020 – 4 October 2022

Personal details
- Born: 13 December 1978 (age 47) Tbilisi, Georgian SSR, Soviet Union
- Party: Georgian Dream

Tamar Taliashvili (born 13 December 1979) is a Georgian politician and diplomat, appointed to be Georgia's Ambassador to the United States. From 2020 to 2022, she was a member of the Parliament of Georgia for Georgian Dream. She has served as Georgia's permanent representative to the Council of Europe from 2022, and in June 2025 was designated as Georgia's next ambassador to the United States.

== Career ==
By training she is a lawyer, with a degree from Tbilisi State University, and repeatedly studied in Germany also, in Saarbrücken (1998-1999) and at the Max Planck Institute for International Intellectual Property (2003).

Previously, Taliashvili served as a Georgian Dream member of the Tbilisi City Council (Sakrebulo), a local self-government body, from 2014 to 2020. She also was the Vice President of the CoE’s Congress of Local and Regional Authorities since 2018. In previous positions, she worked as a Program Manager for USAID Fiscal Reform Projects, as a legal advisor to German Gesellschaft für Internationale Zusammenarbeit (GIZ, formerly GTZ), and as an expert for the Georgian International Oil Corporation. She is listed as a co-founder of the Georgian Association of Arbitrators (GAA), and has worked in private legal practice and with leading US law firms.

== Personal life ==
She is married to businessman Davit Kukhalashvili. In December 2025, OC Media reported that Davit Kukhalashvili is the founder of a Moscow-based law firm aiding sanctioned Russian businesses. The report cited corporate records indicating that the firm advised clients affected by EU and US sanctions imposed on Russia after its invasion of Ukraine.

She is the daughter of Aleksandre Taliashvili, a judge who was arrested for taking a bribe in 2004.
