= Merab Kakulia =

Georgian economist

Merab Kakulia (Georgian: მერაბ კაკულია) (born June 29, 1961, Georgia) is a Georgian economist, Senior Fellow of the Georgian Foundation for Strategic and International Studies, Professor of the School of Law and Politics of the Georgian Institute of Public Affairs (GIPA). He was the Editor in Chief of Georgian Economic Trends (GET) (EU funded quarterly review) from 2005 to 2009.

Merab Kakulia served as Vice-President of the National Bank of Georgia (NBG) (from 1993 to 2005) and was actively engaged in overcoming the country’s hyperinflation, the introduction of the national currency – Georgian lari and the formation of the modern banking sector in Georgia.

Merab Kakulia graduated in Economics from Tbilisi Tbilisi State University in 1983, earned his PhD (Candidate of Science degree) from the Moscow State University in 1986 and a Doctor of Science degree from Melkadze Scientific Research Institute of the Economic and Social Problems (Tbilisi, Georgia) in 2002.

Merab Kakulia’s extensive professional experience is reflected in his publications on Macroeconomics, Banking and Finance, International Economics and Transitional Economics. He is a Member of the Georgian Academy of Economic Sciences and Executive Secretary of the Scientific Committee for Economics of the Georgian National Academy of Sciences.

== Bibliography ==
- Structure of unemployment and structural unemployment in Georgia. Co-author. Tbilisi, Friedrich Ebert Stiftung, 2016
- GEORGIA’S EXPERIENCE ON DEVELOPING TRADE AND TRADE POLICY MEASURES WITH THE EUROPEAN UNION. East European Studies, 2014, No. 5, pp. 137-160.
- On the Political Economy of Economic Slowdown in Georgia, Expert Opinion 9, Tbilisi, GFSIS, 2013
- Economy of Georgia, Co-author, Publishing company “Siaxle,” 307 pp., Tbilisi, 2012 (in Georgian).
- Georgia’s Financial Sector Assessment, Prepared for USAID/Georgia, November 23, 2011, Co-author, The Mitchell Group, Inc. and Counterpart International, 76 pp.
- “Trade Policy of the Post-crisis Georgia,” in Works, Georgian Academy of Economic Sciences, Tbilisi, 2011 (in Georgian).
- Implementation of the European Neighborhood Policy Action Plan for Georgia in Trade and some Trade Related Areas in 2010, Co-author, Eurasia Partnership Foundation (EPF) and SIDA, Tbilisi, January, 2011.
- “Economic Integration and Regulatory Convergence with the EU Policies: A View from Georgia,” in Eastern Partnership for the South Caucasus, The Levan Mikeladze Foundation, 255 pp., Tbilisi, 2011.
- “Macroeconomic Paradigm of Post-War Georgia,” in Georgia, 2009: Post-War Challenges & Perspectives, Independent Experts’ Club, Tbilisi, 2010.
- “Possible Macroeconomic Effect of the Free Trade between Georgia and the EU,” in Works, Georgian Academy of Economic Sciences, Tbilisi, 2010 (in Georgian).
- Implementation of the 18-month Economic Program in Georgia in the Framework of the Stand-By Arrangement of the IMF, Open Society Georgia Foundation (OSGF), Policy Paper Nr.18, 2009 (in Georgian).
- “Mitigating Post-War Economic Threats in Georgia,” in Georgian Economic Trends, Quarterly Review, October 2008.
- “Before and After the Introduction of the Lari: Georgian National Currency in Retrospect,” in Central Eurasia: National Currencies, Edited by Eldar M. Ismailov, CA&CC Press, Stockholm, 2008.
- “Labor Migrant’s Remittances to Georgia, Volume, Structure and Socio-Economic Effects,” in Georgian Economic Trends, Quarterly Review, October 2007.
- The European Neighborhood Policy and Georgia: Analyses of Independent Experts, Co-author, Friedrich-Ebert-Stiftung (FES) and Open Society Georgia Foundation (OSGF), 214 pp., Tbilisi, 2007 (in Georgian).
- "The Primary Objectives and Priorities of Monetary Policy in Georgia". Problems of Economic Transition. 48 (4). August 2005.
- “Implementing European Standards of Banking Regulation in Georgia,” in EU Accession - Financial Sector Opportunities and Challenges for Southeast Europe, Springer, Berlin - Heidelberg, 2005.
- “Composition of the Domestic Foreign Exchange Market in Georgia,” in Bulletin of the Georgian Academy of Sciences, Volume 165, N 1, 2002.
- “Concept and Indicators of Dollarization,” in Bulletin of the Georgian Academy of Sciences, Volume 164, N 3, 2001.
- “Formation of the Floating Exchange Rate Regime in a Transitional Economy: The Georgian Experience,” in Money and Credit, N 10, 2001 (in Russian).
- “Content and Mechanism of a Modern Currency Crisis,” in Society and Economy, N 5, 2001 (in Russian).
- The Problems of Development of the Monetary System in Georgia, 282 pp., Tbilisi, 2001 (in Georgian).
- Dollarization in Georgia: Size of the Problem, Factors and the Ways of Solution, Co-author, 118 pp., Tbilisi, 2000 (in Georgian).
