= Amilakhvari Dialogue =

Strategic dialogue format between Georgia and France

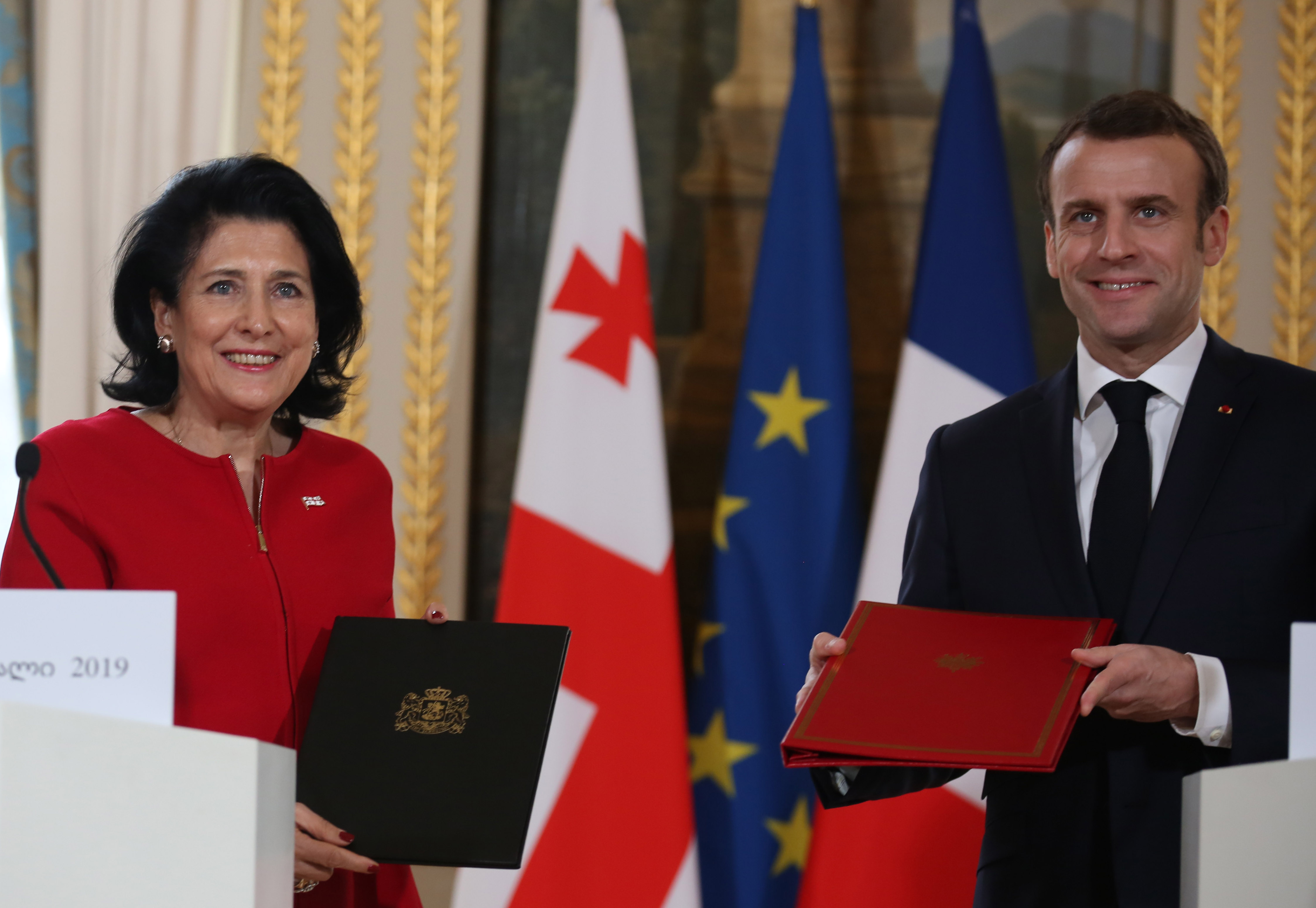
Salome Zourabichvili and Emmanuel Macron exchanging declarations of establishing the Dialogue at the Élysée Palace. 2019

The Dimitri Amilakhvari Georgian-French Dialogue is a high-level format of bilateral co-operation between France and Georgia that serves to address a wide range of co-operation issues. A declaration on launching the dialogue was signed in Paris in February 2019 by the President of the French Republic Emmanuel Macron and the President of Georgia Salome Zourabichvili.

The dialogue bears the name of a lieutenant-colonel of the Foreign Legion, Dimitri Amilakhvari, cadet of the Georgian national army, who arrived in France in 1922 after the invasion of Georgia by the Soviet army. He was trained in Saint-Cyr, was engaged in the French army, was combatant of the Second World War under the orders of General Koenig and was decorated with the Cross of the Liberation by General de Gaulle. He died for France at the Battle of El-Alamein in Egypt .

== History ==
The initiative to establish the dialogue was announced by the former Minister of Europe and Foreign Affairs of the French Republic, Jean-Yves Le Drian, on May 26, 2018, during his visit to Georgia. On February 19, 2019, during the visit of the President of Georgia Salome Zourabichvili to France, the presidents of the two countries signed a declaration on the establishment of dialogue.

On December 2, 2019, in Paris, under the co-presidency of Jean-Yves Le Drian, Minister for Europe and Foreign Affairs of the French Republic, and Davit Zalkaliani, Minister of Foreign Affairs of Georgia, the first political session of the dialogue opened.
