= Levan Mikeladze =

Georgian diplomat and politician

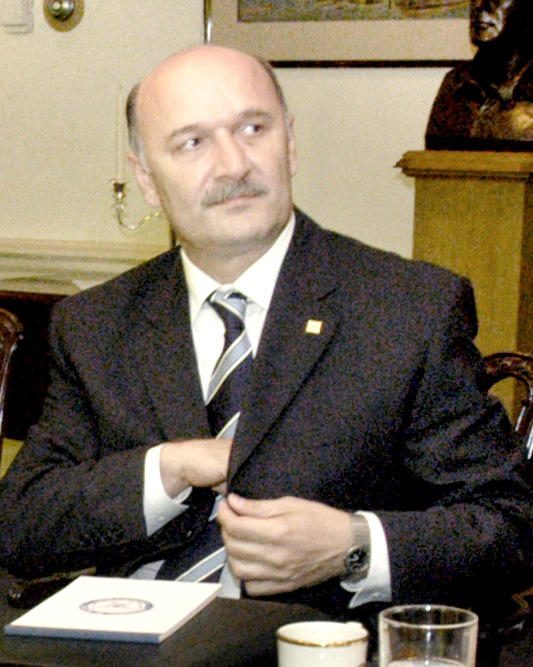
- Levan Mikeladze in August 2004

Ambassador of Georgia to the United States
- In office 2001–2003
- Preceded by: Tedo Japaridze
- Succeeded by: Lasha Zhvania

Ambassador of Georgia to Austria, Switzerland, Hungary, Slovenia, and Slovakia
- In office 1994–2001

Personal details
- Born: August 17, 1957 Tbilisi, Georgian SSR, Soviet Union
- Died: April 26, 2009 (aged 51) Tbilisi, Georgia
- Education: Tbilisi State University
- Occupation: Diplomat, politician
- Profession: Diplomat

Levan Mikeladze (Georgian: ლევან მიქელაძე) (February 26, 1957 – April 26, 2009) was a Georgian diplomat and politician. He was Georgia's Ambassador to Austria (from 1996 to 2002), to United States (from 2002 to 2006) and to Switzerland (from 2006 to 2007). Soon after his resignation, Mikeladze announced his withdrawal into opposition to the Mikheil Saakashvili administration and joined the Alliance for Georgia, party led by Irakli Alasania. On April 26, 2009 he died of a heart attack.

== Education ==
Born in Tbilisi, Mikeladze graduated from Tbilisi State University with a degree in Economic and Social Geography in 1978. He has also completed doctoral work at the Soviet Academy of Sciences, Institute of Geography in Moscow, and was a Fulbright Scholar at the Center for International Security and Arms Control at Stanford University in 1994.

== Professional background ==
After graduating from Tbilisi State University Mikeladze started his diplomatic career at the Embassy of Soviet Union in Afghanistan. After the collapse of the Soviet Union Levan Mikeladze was an adviser to Eduard Shevardnadze, Head of State of the Republic of Georgia, from 1992 to 1994. He worked for the Georgian embassy in the United States from 1995 until 1996, and later was appointed ambassador to Austria and a representative at Organization for Security and Co-operation in Europe (OSCE) and other international organizations headquartered in Vienna. Later Mikeladze served as Georgia’s ambassador to United States, Canada, and Mexico (from 2002 to 2006), and to Switzerland from 2006 until November 2007, when he resigned, citing his protest to the police dispersal of opposition demonstration in downtown Tbilisi on November 7, 2007.

After quitting diplomatic career Mikeladze served as External Affairs Manager at Tethys Petroleum Limited.

== Joining opposition ==
In February 2009, Mikeladze withdrew into opposition to Mikheil Saakashvili’s government and joined the Alliance for Georgia party led by Irakli Alasania, Georgia's former envoy to the United Nations.

== Death ==
On April 26, 2009 the Alliance for Georgia reported his death of a heart attack. Hours earlier, he made his last public appearance during which he attempted to clarify the critical remark by the French ambassador Eric Fournier regarding the opposition’s obstruction of the section of Tbilisi's Rustaveli Avenue where the Parliament of Georgia is located.
