= David Zalkaliani =

Georgian diplomat; Minister of Foreign Affairs of Georgia

- დავით ზალკალიანი
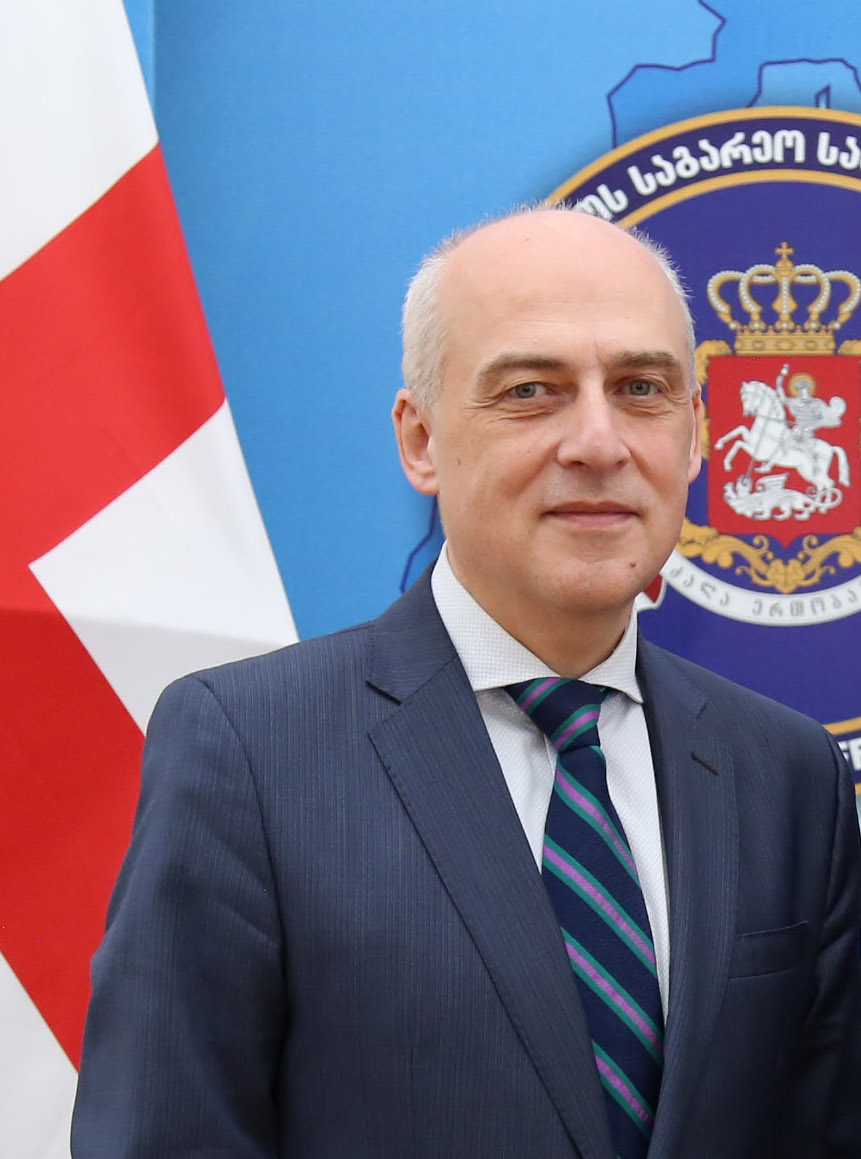
- Zalkaliani in 2018

Georgian Ambassador to the United States
- In office 4 April 2022 – 30 November 2024
- Prime Minister: Irakli Garibashvili; Irakli Kobakhidze
- Preceded by: David Bakradze
- Succeeded by: Tamar Taliashvili

Deputy Prime Minister of Georgia
- In office 21 January 2021 – 4 April 2022
- Prime Minister: Giorgi Gakharia; Maya Tskitishvili (acting); Irakli Garibashvili
- Preceded by: Maya Tskitishvili
- Succeeded by: Levan Davitashvili

15th Minister of Foreign Affairs
- In office 21 June 2018 – 4 April 2022
- Prime Minister: Mamuka Bakhtadze; Giorgi Gakharia; Maya Tskitishvili (acting); Irakli Garibashvili
- Preceded by: Mikheil Janelidze
- Succeeded by: Ilia Darchiashvili

President of the Committee of Ministers of the Council of Europe
- In office 27 November 2019 – 15 May 2020
- Preceded by: Jean-Yves Le Drian
- Succeeded by: Nikos Dendias

First Deputy Minister of Foreign Affairs
- In office 8 January 2016 – 21 June 2018
- Prime Minister: Giorgi Kvirikashvili
- Minister: Mikheil Janelidze
- In office 29 October 2012 – 5 November 2014
- Prime Minister: Bidzina Ivanishvili; Irakli Garibashvili
- Minister: Maia Panjikidze

Executive Director of the Levan Mikeladze Foundation
- In office 2015 – 7 January 2016
Diplomatic posts
Ambassador of Georgia to the Republic of Belarus
In office
January 2008 – September 2009
Director of the Department of Global Relations of the Ministry of Foreign Affairs
In office
January 2007 – December 2007
Ambassador of Georgia to Uzbekistan and Tajikistan
In office
2004–2007
Senior Counsellor at the Embassy of Georgia to the United States, Mexico and Canada
In office
2002–2004
Deputy Permanent Representative of Georgia to OSCE and International Organizations in Vienna
In office
March 2002 – September 2002

Personal details
- Born: 27 February 1968 (age 58) Tbilisi, Georgian Soviet Socialist Republic, USSR
- Party: Georgian Dream
- Children: 2
- Education: Tbilisi State University

David Zalkaliani (Georgian: დავით ზალკალიანი; born 27 February 1968) is a Georgian politician and career diplomat who served as the Ambassador of Georgia to the United States from April 4, 2022 until November 30, 2024. From June 21, 2018 to April 4, 2022 he served as the Minister of Foreign Affairs of Georgia. From January 21, 2021 to April 4, 2022 he was also Deputy Prime Minister of Georgia.

== Early life and career ==
He was born on February 27, 1968, in Tbilisi. His father, Murtaz Zalkaliani, was an economist and member of the Georgian Parliament of the third convocation (1992–1995). In 1992 he graduated from Ivane Javakhishvili Tbilisi State University majoring in international law.

Soon after Georgia regained its independence in 1992, Zalkaliani joined the Ministry of Foreign Affairs, serving as an Attaché in the Department of International Organizations, being subsequently promoted to the Deputy Head of the Division at the same department in 1995.

During the aforementioned period, it was of utmost importance for Georgia to claim a place of its own within the system of international relations, by joining appropriate international organizations. During the same period Georgia started cooperating with the European Community, which in 1992 recognized Georgia's independence. Back in those years, cooperation between Georgia and the European Community was mainly focused on humanitarian and technical issues, in which Zalkaliani was actively involved.

== Ambassadorial roles ==
From 1996 to 2000, Zalkaliani served as a Counsellor at the Embassy of Georgia to the Republic of Austria and the Permanent Mission of Georgia to the OSCE and International Organization’s in Vienna. He took part in the negotiating process on the text of the Agreement on Adaptation of the Treaty on Conventional Armed Forces in Europe. He participated in various important high-level summits, including the Budapest Summit of 1994, the Lisbon Summit of 1996 and the Istanbul Summit of 1999. Zalkaliani actively participated in the process of negotiations for the withdrawal of Russian military bases from the territory of Georgia. During Zalkaliani's diplomatic tenure in Austria, the Georgian mission in Vienna was represented by the prominent Georgian diplomat, Ambassador Levan Mikeladze. Later, Zalkaliani joined Mikeladze, when Mikeladze became actively involved in social and political activities.

In 2001–2002, Zalkaliani returned to Vienna to assume the position of Deputy Permanent Representative of Georgia to the OSCE.

In 2002–2004, Zalkaliani served as a Senior Counsellor at the Embassy of Georgia to the U.S., Mexico and Canada; during his tenure, US-Georgia defense cooperation was considerably intensified.

In 2004 Zalkaliani continued his diplomatic career in Uzbekistan having served as an Ambassador Extraordinary and Plenipotentiary of Georgia to the Republics of Uzbekistan and Tajikistan. In 2008 he was appointed as an Ambassador Extraordinary and Plenipotentiary of Georgia to the Republic of Belarus.

=== Brief returns to Georgia ===
During this period from 1996-2009, breifly returned to TblisitIn 2000–2001, he continued serving as a Counsellor at the Department for European Affairs of the Ministry of Foreign Affairs, overseeing the task of deepening bilateral cooperation with European countries. In 2007, Zalkaliani was appointed as the Director of the Department of Global Relations of the Ministry of Foreign Affairs of Georgia. Over the next year he assumed the position of the Ambassador-at-large.

== Entry to politics ==
In 2009 Zalkaliani left his position as an Ambassador and entered politics along a group of like-minded people. He actively participated in the creation of the political party – “Free Democrats”, that was followed by the victory of the Georgian Dream coalition in 2012 Georgian parliamentary election. Afterwards the “Georgian dream – Free Democrats” parliamentary faction was established. The same year Zalkaliani becomes First Deputy Minister of Foreign Affairs.

Since his appointment as the first Deputy Minister of Foreign Affairs, along with other important directions, David Zalkaliani has been actively engaged in the process of preparation of the Georgia-EU Association Agreement, acting as the Chief Negotiator on Georgia’s behalf. Negotiations were successfully concluded on the 27th of June 2014 with the ceremonious signing of the Association Agreement, between the European Union and Georgia, including the Deep and Comprehensive Free Trade Area (DCFTA) component. From 2012 to 2014 Zalkaliani was a Chief Negotiator from the Georgian side in the Geneva International Discussions and the Co-Chair of working groups of U.S.-Georgia Charter on Strategic Partnership.

In 2015 Zalkaliani continued his diplomatic career as an executive director in the newly founded Levan Mikeladze Foundation. During his tenure, his activities included, inter alia, research of public politics, and advocacy projects implementation, capacity building for diplomats, holding academic and public discussions on foreign policy priorities.

== Foreign Minister (2018-2022) ==
In 2016 David Zalkaliani once again assumed the position of the First Deputy Minister of Foreign Affairs and on the 21st of June 2018 was promoted to the position of the Minister of Foreign Affairs of Georgia.

On January 21, 2021, Foreign Minister David Zalkaliani was appointed as Deputy Prime Minister of Georgia.

== Ambassador to the US (2022-2024) ==
On April 4, 2022, Prime Minister Irakli Garibashvili announced Zalkaliani’s departure from the government and his appointment as the ambassador to the United States. He completed his term on 30 November 2024, and was succeeded by Tamar Taliashvili the following June.

== Personal life ==
Zalkaliani is married and has two daughters. He is fluent in English and Russian.

Political offices
Preceded by Mikheil Janelidze 2015-2018	Minister of Foreign Affairs; 2018–2022	Succeeded by Ilia Darchiashvili
