= Archil Gegeshidze =

Georgian diplomat and scholar

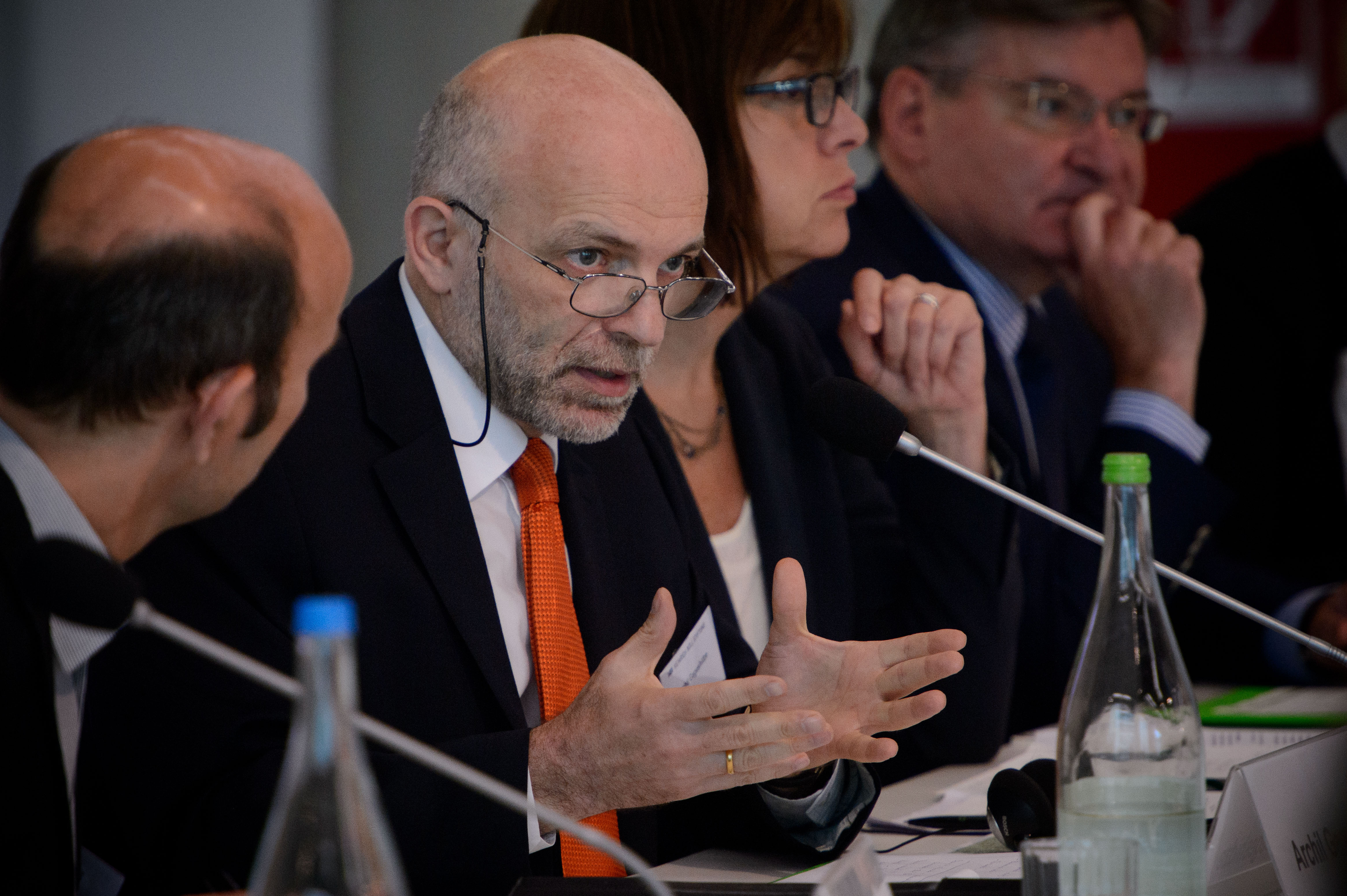
Gegeshidze, 2014

Archil M. Gegeshidze (born 1956) is a Georgian diplomat and scholar. He is currently the executive director of the Levan Mikeladze Foundation. He was Georgia's ambassador to the United States from 2013 to 2016. He was born in Tbilisi, Georgia.

== Academic career ==
Gegeshidze studied social geography at Tbilisi State University, receiving his PhD (Candidate of Science) in Economic and Social Geography in 1985. In 1994 Gegeshidze became a post-graduate student in the Department for Social and Economic Geography of the Tbilisi State University.

He took part in international seminars such as 'Japan, Europe and North America: Toward a G-3 World?' at the Salzburg Global Seminar and 'Decision Making in U.S. Foreign Policy' at the United States Information Agency International Visitor Program. He was a Visiting Fulbright Scholar at Stanford University in the U.S. in 2000-2001. Later, he received the Fulbright Alumni Initiative Award and in 2005-2006 the International Policy Fellowship.

From 2001 until 2013 he worked as a Senior Fellow at the Georgian Foundation for Strategic and International Studies, a Tbilisi-based think-tank.

He fluently speaks English, Russian and French.

== National security and diplomatic career ==
From 1993 to 1994, Gegeshidze was deputy head of the First European Department of the Ministry of Foreign Affairs of Georgia. From 1994 to 1995, he was State Advisor to the Staff of Georgian President Eduard Shevardnadze. From 1996 to 1997, he was Assistant to the President on national security affairs. From 1997 to 2000, he was head of the section for foreign policy analysis at the State Chancellery of the President of Georgia and worked as Chief Foreign Policy Advisor. In 1999 he was awarded with the diplomatic rank of an extraordinary and plenipotentiary Ambassador.

In March 2013, Gegeshidze was appointed Georgia's ambassador to the United States, and served from April 15, 2013 until October 9, 2016.

== Selected publications ==
- Security of the Caucasus and the Black Sea Area: Problems and Opportunities. Proceedings of the Conference on "Future Conventional Arms Control Requirements in Europe", Stiftung Wissenschaft und Politik, Ebenhausen, 1994.
- The South Caucasus: Getting Close to Europe? Marco Polo Magazine, Venice, 1999, No.1.
- The New Silk Road: A Georgian Perspective Perceptions, Vol. V, No. 2, Jun-Aug, 2000.
- Georgia's Transit Capacity National Assessment Report on Sustainable Development, UN Summit, Johannesburg, 2002.
- The Need for a New Regional Agenda in the Black Sea Area, Insight Turkey, Vol.4, No.3, 2002.
- A Strategic Vision for Georgia, The Washington Times, September 13, 2003.
- Georgia's Regional Vulnerabilities and the Ajaria Crisis Insight Turkey, Vol.6, No.2, 2004.
- Gegeshidze at IISS: Russia gains a foothold in the South Caucasus. With new military bases, Moscow has secured its influence in the region
- Archil Gegeshidze: We must do all in our power so that US support for Georgia increases more, Interpressnews, 22.2.2013.
