= List of ambassadors of Georgia to the United Kingdom =

Representative of Georgia to the United Kingdom

Ambassador of Georgia to the United Kingdom
- საქართველოს ელჩი გაერთიანებულ სამეფოში
- Seal of the Ministry of Foreign Affairs of Georgia

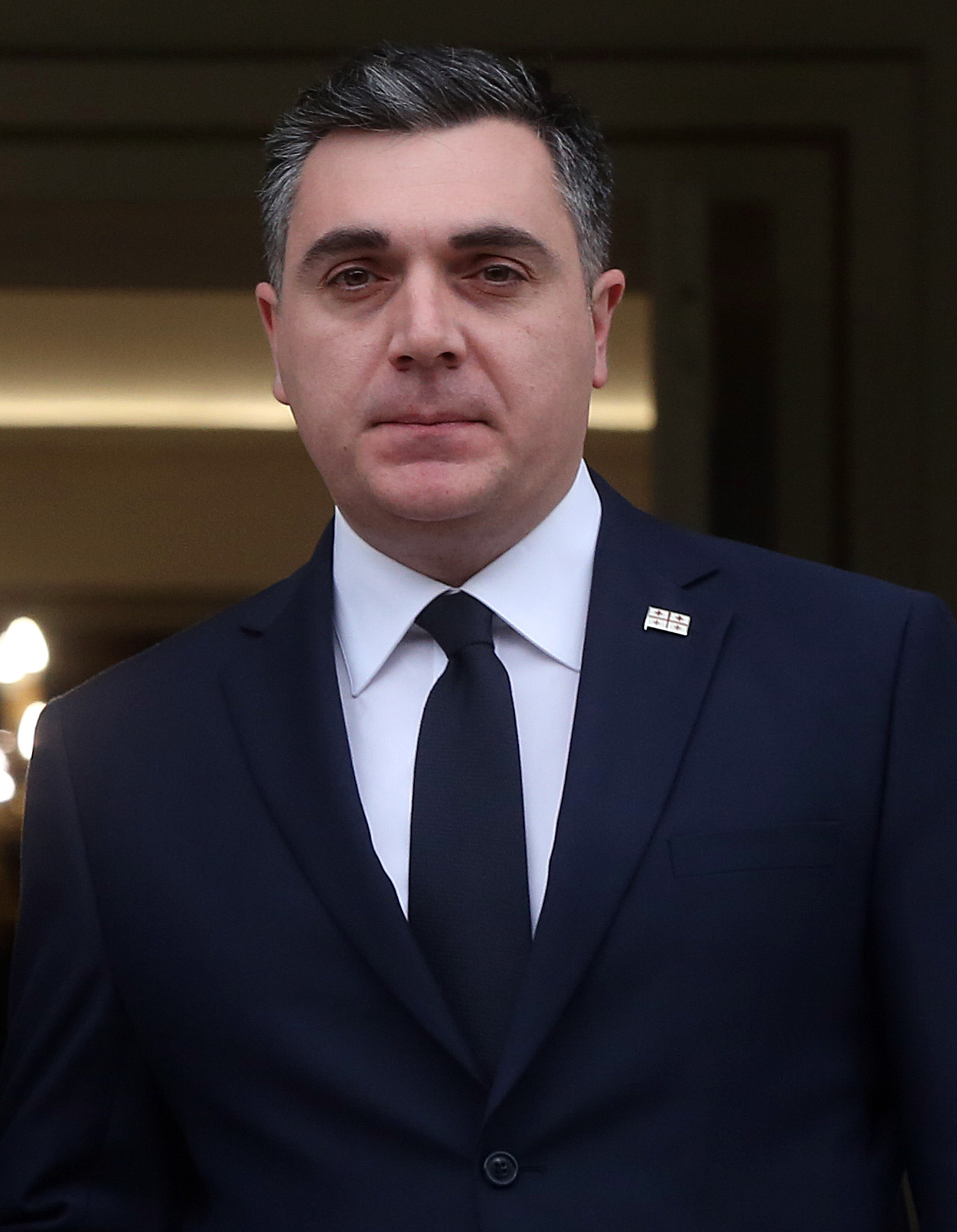
- Incumbent; Ilia Darchiashvili since March 31, 2026
- Ministry of Foreign Affairs of Georgia; Embassy of Georgia, London
- Style: His or Her Excellency (formal); Mr. or Madam Ambassador (informal)
- Reports to: Minister of Foreign Affairs of Georgia
- Seat: London, UK
- Nominator: Prime Minister of Georgia
- Appointer: President of Georgia
- Inaugural holder: Teimuraz Mamatsashvili
- Formation: 1995
- Website: uk.mfa.gov.ge

The Georgian ambassador to the United Kingdom (known formally as the Ambassador Extraordinary and Plenipotentiary of Georgia to the Court of St James's) is the official representative of the and the Government of Georgia to the monarch and government of the United Kingdom. The position is occupied by Ilia Darchiashvili, former Foreign Minister, who was appointed to the role on the 31st of March 2026.

== List of representatives ==
Name	Portrait	Appointment	Presentation	Termination	Appointer	Notes
Teimuraz Mamatsashvili		1995		2004	Eduard Shevardnadze	
Amiran Kavadze		2004		2006	Mikheil Saakashvili	
Gela Charkviani		2006		2009	Mikheil Saakashvili	
Giorgi Badridze		2009		2013	Mikheil Saakashvili	
Revaz Gachechiladze		2013		2016	Giorgi Margvelashvili	
Tamar Beruchashvili		March 2016		April 2020	Giorgi Margvelashvili	
Sophie Katsarava		April 2020		October 2024	Salome Zourabichvili	
Ilia Darchiashvili		March 2026			Mikheil Kavelashvili	

== See also ==
- Embassy of Georgia, London
- Foreign relations of Georgia
- List of ambassadors of the United Kingdom to Georgia
- Georgia–United Kingdom relations
