= Georgia–United Kingdom relations =

- Georgia: United Kingdom

Diplomatic mission
- Embassy of Georgia, London: Embassy of the United Kingdom, Tbilisi

Envoy
- Ambassador Ilia Darchiashvili: Ambassador Gareth Ward

Formal diplomatic relations between Georgia and the United Kingdom can be traced back to at least 1919, when the First Georgian Republic was recognized by the United Kingdom. Even before the Georgian declaration of independence from the Russian Empire, in December 1917, Georgia, along with the rest of the Caucasus region, came under the British "zone of activity" per the Anglo-French Convention of 1917 aimed at supporting the anti-Bolshevik forces in the former Russian Empire to continue fighting against the Central Powers. The British sent the military agency to Tiflis in early 1918 to help organizing the units of Armenian and Georgian volunteers to continue fighting against the Ottoman army, and provided the financial assistance to the Transcaucasian Commissariat. As these measures proved to be unsuccessful to protect Georgia from the Ottoman offensives, Georgia declared independence in May 1918 to seek the German assistance in balancing the Ottoman power. This forced the British military agency to move from Tiflis to Vladikavkaz.

After the defeat of German Empire, Georgia's ally, in World War I, both German and Ottoman troops withdrew from the Caucasus and were supplanted by the British forces in December 1918, which placed the region of Batum under their own administration, while the British troops also occupied the rest of Georgia to stave off the Bolshevik invasion. The Georgian government approved the British presence in the country, although the relations were strained due to the unclarified political status of Batum, which Georgia claimed as its own but some in the British cabinet sought to transform into a free city. The British presence lasted until 1920, when Britain left due to a variety of geopolitical factors.

In the present day, Georgia-UK relations remain very cordial and the two countries cooperate closely. "Georgia is a strategic partner to the UK" and since 2019, relations between the two countries are streamlined by the "UK-Georgia Strategic Partnership and Cooperation Agreement", which largely replaced the EU-Georgia Association Agreement following Brexit. Both countries maintain embassies in the respective capitals.

In 2014, UK and Georgia inaugurated Wardrop strategic dialogue, a format of annual meetings to promote their biletial co-operation in security, defense policy, economy and trade. Both nations are members of the Council of Europe.

Relations between the two countries have become more strained in the wake of the 2024–2025 Georgian protests and the adoption of the foreign agent and anti-LGBTQ laws by the Georgian parliament, with the UK government freezing security dialogue and the UK Foreign Office stating that the 'direction of the [ruling] Georgian Dream party risks freedom of expression and assembly and further discrimination against and stigmatising Georgia's LGBT+ community.'

== History ==
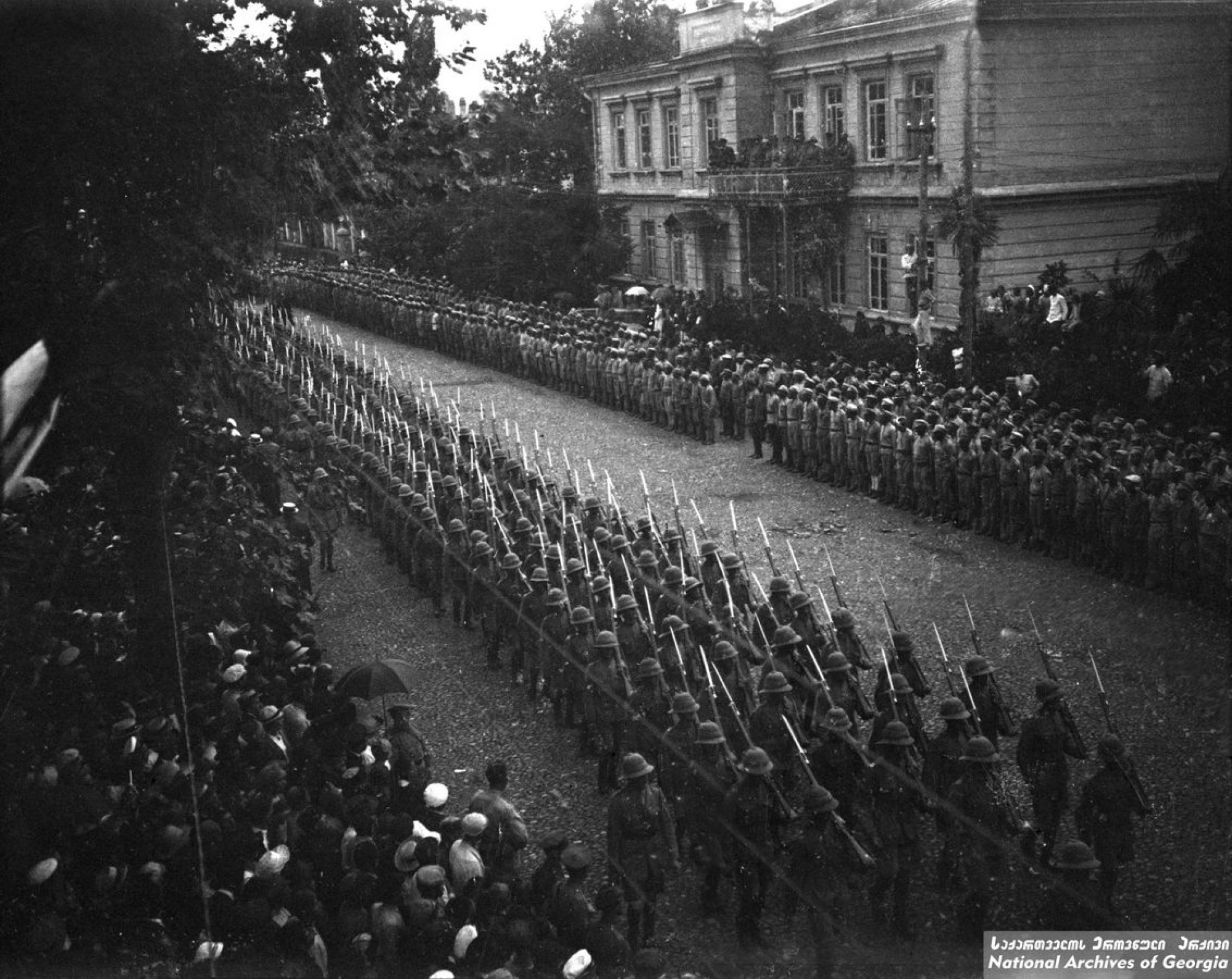
British troops in Batumi, Georgia in 1920

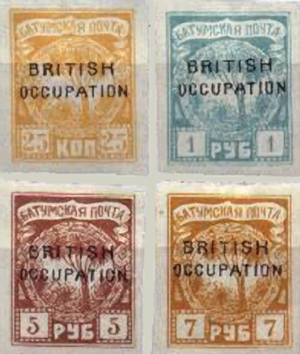
Postage stamps from Batumi, Georgia overprinted with "BRITISH OCCUPATION"

Britain recognized the Democratic Republic of Georgia in 1919. Sir Oliver Wardrop served as the United Kingdom's first Chief Commissioner for Transcaucasia in Georgia from 1919–21. He was welcomed by the government of Noe Zhordania, who supported Wardrop's efforts to promote Georgian culture and gather support from Western nations. During this period, Britain came to view Georgia in a rather favorable light, setting it apart from Bolshevik Russia, as well as some of its neighbors:

"Of the three republics, Georgia is in much the best position. Her territory has escaped the ravages of war, while her people, who prided themselves, even under the old Russian regime, on the European origin of their civilisation, have the advantage over their neighbours in ability and culture. Internal order appears to be well maintained, and the sporadic outburst of Bolshevism which recur at intervals are put down without difficulty and with commendable firmness."

— Lord Curzon

British military presence in Georgia had to come to an end in 1920 because of neutrality clauses in the Treaty of Moscow, in which Russia recognized Georgia's independence in exchange for Georgia not hosting forces hostile to Russia's interests. Now that there were no Western powers in Georgia, in February 1921 the Bolshevik Red Army proceeded to invade the country, leading to Georgia's defeat and collapse by March of that year. Even after Soviet takeover, Britain - along with France, Belgium, and Poland - continued to recognize only the Georgian government; this lasted until the 1930s, when growing Soviet power and political processes in Europe made it impractical to do so indefinitely.

In April 1987, Margaret Thatcher, the British prime minister, made an official state visit to the Soviet Union, on the last day of which she visited the Georgian SSR, specifically Tbilisi. It was the first visit of its kind to Georgia. She was hosted by First Secretary of the Georgian Communist Party Jumber Patiashvili. She was met with crowds in the capital, with Thatcher greeting onlookers with the word "gamarojobat". She also attended a wedding at the Palace of Rituals, where she gave the bride and the groom a porcelain bowl. In the evening, she attended a dinner hosted by Chairman of the Council of Ministers Otar Cherkezia and other regional officials, during which she noted the similarity in cultures, notably the shared patronage of Saint George.

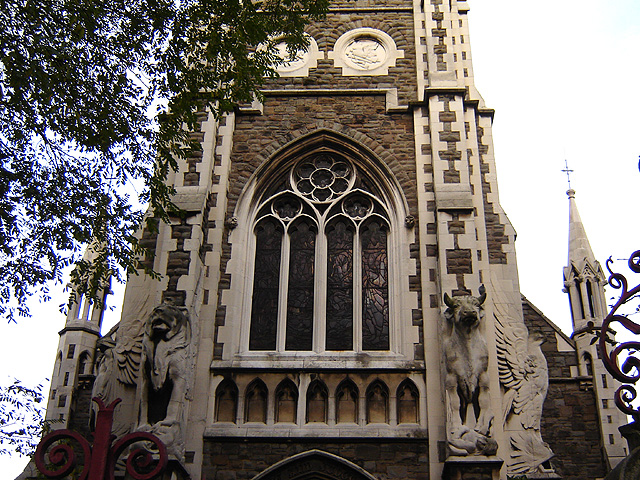
Georgian Orthodox Cathedral of the Nativity of Our Lord, residing in a former Agapemonite church, in Clapton, London

Following the restoration of Georgian independence in 1991, official diplomatic relations between Georgia and the UK were re-established in 1992, and a full UK embassy opened in Tbilisi three years later. In response to the Russo-Georgian War, the British government showed solidarity with Georgia, with the Foreign and Commonwealth Office releasing a statement calling for calm and Foreign Secretary David Miliband saying the following: "Russia has extended the fighting today well beyond South Ossetia, attacking the Georgian port of Poti, and the town of Gori, while Abkhaz forces have been shelling Georgian positions in the Upper Kodori valley. I deplore this." On 10 August 2008, pro-Georgian protesters protested in front of the Russian embassy in London. On 21-25 May 2006, Prime Minister Zurab Nogaideli visited the United Kingdom. In November 2015, former Prime Minister Tony Blair visited Georgia, being hosted by Prime Minister Irakli Garibashvili, who accompanied him to sights such as Mtatsminda Hill.

In recent years relations between the two countries have become strained, in response to the actions of the ruling Georgian Dream party. The British Embassy in Georgia has criticised the state for "undermining fundamental human rights", stating that its Family Values and Minors Protection package has called 'into question the long-standing relationships between Britain and Georgia.' Following the re-election of Georgian Dream, the UK has frozen security dialogue with Georgia and cancelled other talks on defence over "concerns about democratic backsliding", with Ambassador Gareth Ward saying that the Georgian government's actions have prompted Britain to raise 'concerns about the decline of democracy and anti-Western rhetoric.' British Parliamentarians and LGBTQI+ activists have also questioned the safety of Georgia, questioning the previous Conservative government's decision to label Georgia a 'safe state' to return asylum seekers to.

== Economic relations ==
The European Bank for Reconstruction and Development (EBRD) based in the UK plays an important role in the development of the Georgian economy. The UK is one of the largest investors in Georgia. In 2017, it was third on the list with direct investments, having invested a total of $250 million that year. The twin cities of Tbilisi and Bristol, Newport and Kutaisi have affected the impact tourism has, with there being a 40% increase in British tourists to Georgia in 2017. Former British Army officer and former Leader of the Conservatives in the European Parliament Geoffrey Van Orden said that in terms of economic relations, Georgia was one of the "first of our friends to back post-Brexit Britain and seek a close future partnership".

=== Trade agreements ===
From 1 September 2013 until 30 December 2020, trade between Georgia and the UK was governed by the Georgia–European Union Deep and Comprehensive Free Trade Area, while the United Kingdom was a member of the European Union. Following the withdrawal of the United Kingdom from the European Union, the UK and Georgia signed a continuity trade agreement on 21 October 2019, based on the EU free trade agreement; the agreement entered into force on 1 January 2021. It was the first continuity trade agreement signed between the United Kingdom and an Eastern European country. Trade value between Georgia and the United Kingdom was worth £457 million in 2022.

== Defence and security relations ==
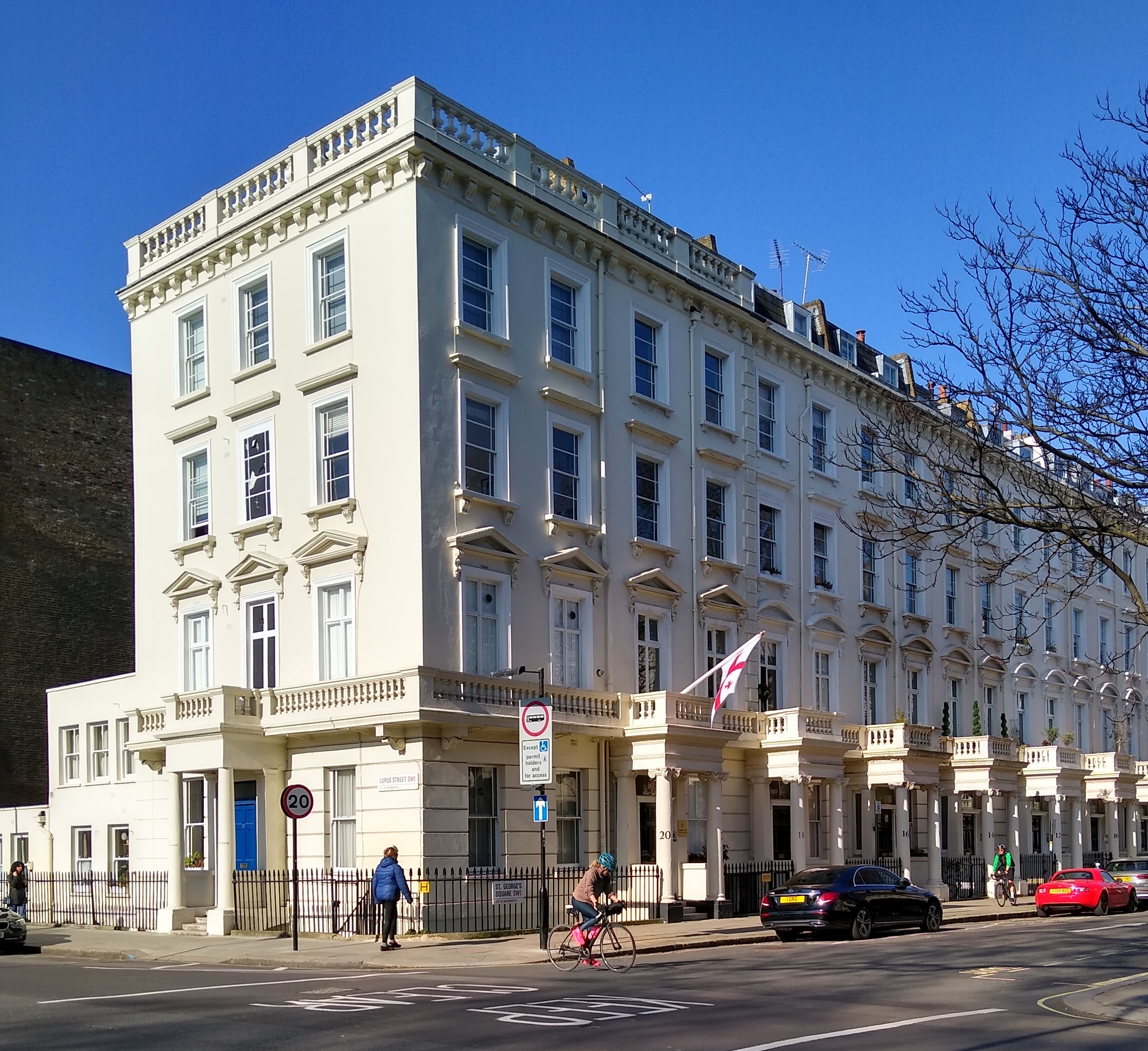
Embassy of Georgia at St George's Square, London

Britain has a history of working with the Georgian Armed Forces during the War in Afghanistan, where Georgia has long been the largest non-NATO troop contributor. After the United States, Britain, and their East European allies failed to secure NATO membership plan for Georgia in 2008, the British government floated proposals to help Georgia join the military alliance through alternative means without necessarily needing the formal membership plan. These British efforts were ultimately not successful due to opposition from a subset of countries led by France and Germany.

In March 2016, parallel to British troops participating in multilateral exercises in Georgia, the British Armed Forces announced the creation of additional defence attaché posts in Georgia.

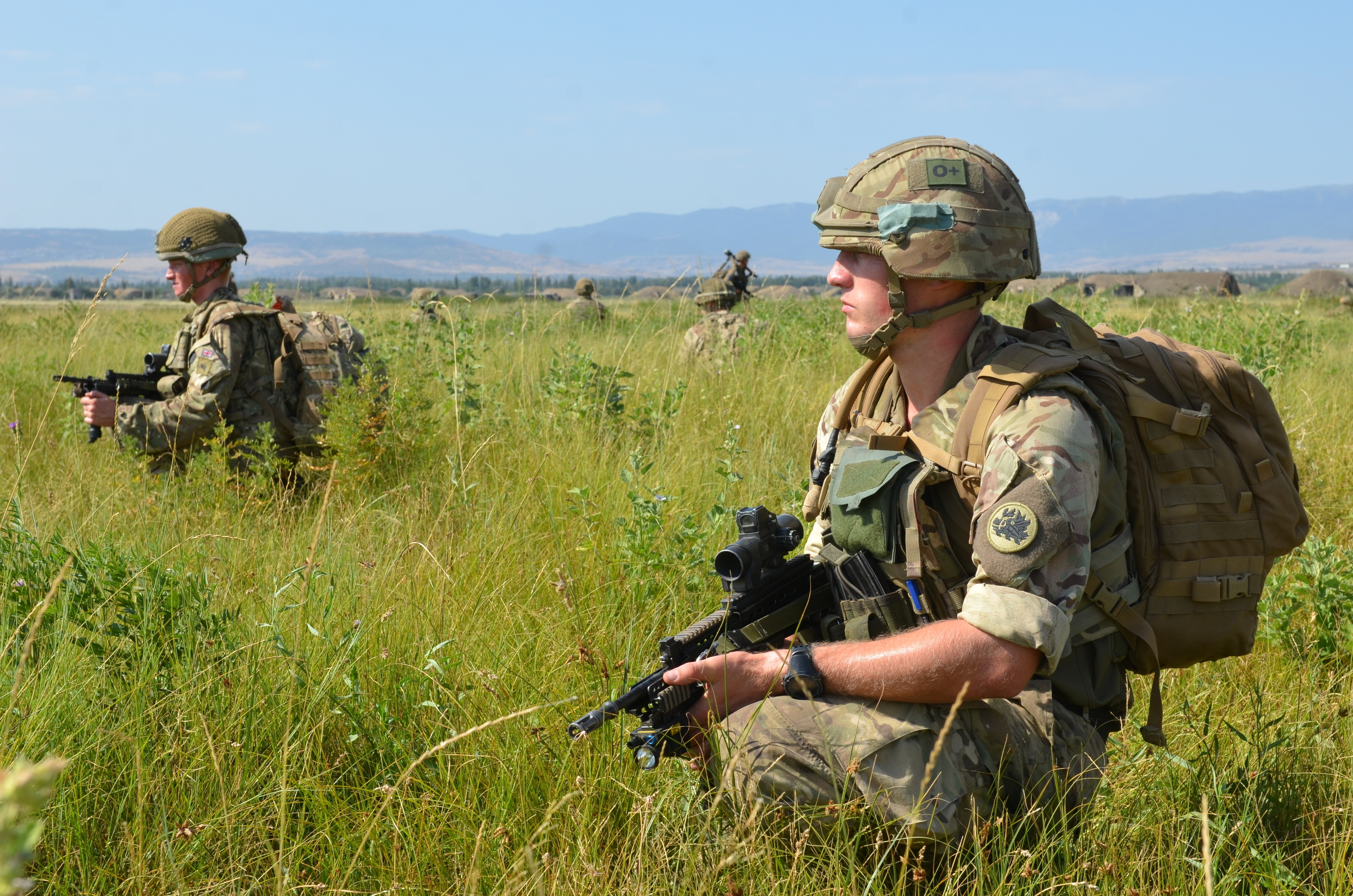
British troops during the annual "Noble Partner" military exercises in Vaziani, Georgia

In 2018, Georgia sided with UK's diplomatic efforts against Russia in response to the Salisbury chemical attack by Russian intelligence services and also supported UK initiatives for strengthening the Organisation for the Prohibition of Chemical Weapons (OPCW). Because Georgia and Russia had already severed diplomatic relations in 2008, and officially there were no longer any Russian diplomats present in Georgia, in show of support for the UK, Georgia expelled a Russian official operating in the country under the nominal auspices of Switzerland.

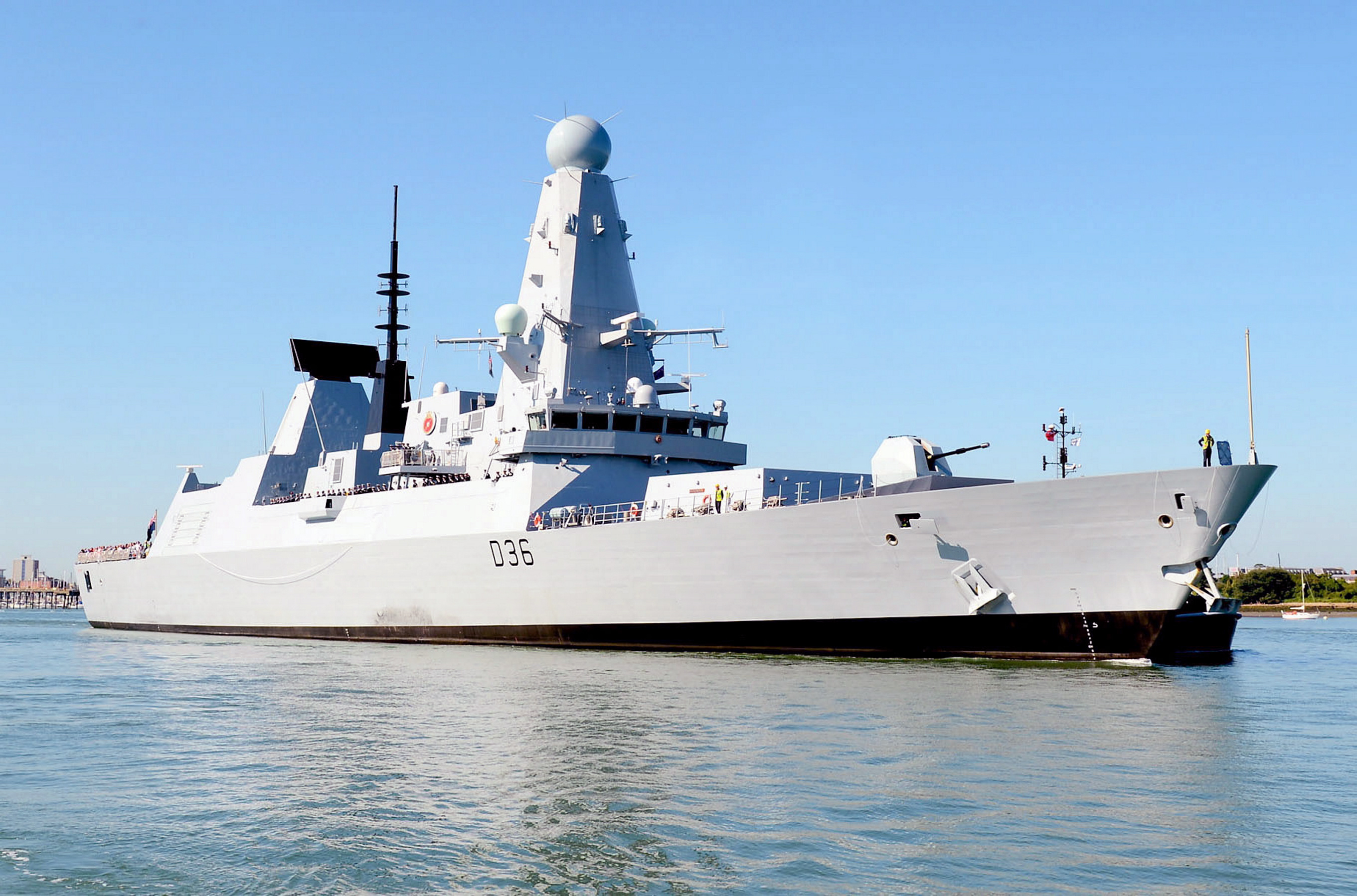
HMS Defender was involved in the 2021 Black Sea incident while on its way to Batumi, Georgia

In February 2020, UK's National Cyber Security Centre, operating under the aegis of GCHQ, helped expose Russian Military Intelligence hacking activities directed against Georgia. The British government noted that Russia "conducted these cyber-attacks in an attempt to undermine Georgia's sovereignty, to sow discord and disrupt the lives of ordinary Georgian people. The UK remains unwavering in its support for Georgia's sovereignty and territorial integrity"

Royal Navy destroyers make regular port calls in Georgia to show support and/or conduct bilateral trainings. Some travel routes used by the Royal Navy to make such visits have attracted controversy and anger from Russia. Commander of HMS Defender rebuffed these complaints, stating the Royal Navy is committed to "providing reassurances and security in the region, and incredible deterrence to those who seek to undermine global security...and Georgia's territorial integrity and sovereignty".

At the 2022 Madrid summit, the UK Prime Minister Boris Johnson announced more than £5 million in additional support to enhance Georgia's cyber capabilities, reasoning that the "people of Georgia live every day on the frontline of Russian aggression. Putin cannot be allowed to use Georgia's sovereign institutions to sharpen the knife of his cyber capability."

Following the highly disputed re-election of Georgian Dream, the UK government froze security dialogue with Georgia, with the UK Ambassador Gareth Ward saying that the Georgian government's actions had prompted Britain to raise 'concerns about the decline of democracy and anti-Western rhetoric.' Stephen Doughty, the Foreign Office's Minister of State for Europe, North America and Overseas Territories has said that it is 'clear that the direction of the Georgian Dream party risks undermining freedom of expression and assembly and further discriminating against and stigmatising Georgia's LGBT+ community, including through the introduction of the Law on Family Values', and that he has raised 'concerns over recent legislative changes' with the Georgian Foreign Minister Darchiashvili.

== Commonwealth War Graves ==
There is a British Military Cemetery in Batumi, Georgia, where 68 Britons are buried. There is a small memorial listing the names of the deceased. It gets periodic visits from the UK, including the Royal Navy.

== Resident diplomatic missions ==
- Georgia has an embassy in London.
- United Kingdom has an embassy in Tbilisi.

== See also ==
- Foreign relations of Georgia
- Foreign relations of the United Kingdom
- Georgians in Europe
