= Aleksandre Chikvaidze =

Soviet-Georgian statesman and diplomat

- ალექსანდრე ჩიკვაიძე
- Chikvaidze in 1995

3rd Minister of Foreign Affairs of Georgia
- In office 15 February 1992 – 31 December 1995
- President: Eduard Shevardnadze
- Deputy: Tedo Japaridze; Giga Burduli; Mikheil Ukleba
- Preceded by: Murman Omanidze
- Succeeded by: Irakli Menagarishvili

Personal details
- Born: 19 January 1932 Tbilisi, Georgian SSR, Soviet Union (now Georgia)
- Died: 2012 Tbilisi, Georgia

Aleksandre Chikvaidze (Georgian: ალექსანდრე ჩიკვაიძე; 19 January 1932 – 8 May 2012) was a Soviet and Georgian statesman and diplomat. Chikvaidze was appointed Foreign Minister and Deputy Prime Minister of independent Georgia by Acting Prime Minister Tengiz Sigua in February 1992 and went on to serve in Eduard Shevardnadze's government, after the latter's return to Georgia in March 1992, until December 1995.

During his tenure as foreign minister, Chikvaidze ushered Georgia into the United Nations as its 179th member, on 31 July 1992, and managed a wave of diplomatic recognition of Georgia, the establishment of bilateral diplomatic relations between Georgia and the countries of the world, and of the integration of Georgia into most international organizations. Chikvaidze undertook strenuous efforts to place the problems of Georgia's internal conflicts in Abkhazia and South Ossetia, that were raging at the time, on the international agenda, of the Organization for Security and Co-operation in Europe, the Council of Europe and to have the United Nations Security Council ‘seized of the matter,’ while working closely with the Russian government to keep it engaged in helping Georgia find a solution to these conflicts. Chikvaidze opened Georgia's relationship with NATO by signing the Partnership for Peace Framework Document in March 1994. After leaving the foreign minister post, Chikvaidze served as Georgian ambassador to Greece, to the Holy See, to Switzerland and as Permanent Representative of Georgia to the United Nations Office at Geneva, from 1996 to 2005. He retired from active diplomatic service in June 2005, almost two years into the presidency of Mikheil Saakashvili.

== Early life and family ==
Chikvaidze was born on 19 January 1932, in Tbilisi, the capital of what was then the Georgian Soviet Socialist Republic of the Soviet Union. He was the only child of Tamar Chikvaidze (née Kobiashvili), an economist and David Chikvaidze, a highly regarded performer of Georgian national choreography, in later years, serving as deputy director of the Georgian philharmonic.

Chikvaidze's family was quite prestigious; his great uncle, Kalistrate Chikvaidze, was a well-known lawyer, political figure and philanthropist in Georgia's second largest city Kutaisi at the turn of the twentieth century. His maternal grandmother, Barbara Kobiashvili, and his maternal grandfather Joseph Kobiashvili, a judge whose honesty was reputed, were both graduates of St. Petersburg University, and played a huge role in his early education. Chikvaidze never knew his paternal grandfather Aleksandre, whom he was named after. As a senior member of the government of the Democratic Republic of Georgia during the country's brief period of independence in 1918–1921, he was persecuted by the new communist authorities and emigrated to France, where he died in 1937 without ever seeing his wife and two sons again.

Chikvaidze's family was of very modest means, despite which, his parents tightened their proverbial belts in order to have him take private lessons in English and in music, an unheard of luxury in the bleak days of the Second World War in the Soviet Union. In 1956, Chikvaidze married Zaira Mshvenieradze, a hydroelectric engineer, who loves literature, the movies, and speaks English and French. They had two sons, David (b. 1958) and Alexander (1963-2006), two grandchildren and four great-grandchildren.

== Education ==
Chikvaidze graduated with honours from Tbilisi Secondary School No. 1 and went on to study law at Moscow State University, graduating in 1955 together with his classmate Mikhail Gorbachev. In the 1960s, he studied English at the Tbilisi Foreign Languages Institute, French at the Alliance française in Mumbai, India, and, in the 1980s, while ambassador at the Hague, also learned Dutch. Chikvaidze earned an advanced degree in history at the Moscow State Academy of Social Sciences in 1966. He earned a full doctorate in 1976 at Tbilisi State University and published his dissertation as a book “The British Cabinet on the Eve of the Second World War”, which he had based on the just declassified in 1969 archives of the Foreign Office in the pre-war years. In 1978, he took a special two-year international relations course for senior government officials at the Soviet Diplomatic Academy, graduating within one year and, in 1979, was named the Soviet Consul General in San Francisco.

== Political and diplomatic career ==
Chikvaidze raising the Georgian flag at UNHQ together with Secretary-General Boutros Boutros-Ghali upon Georgia's entry into the United Nations as its 179th member, 31 July 1992.

Left without a job due to an oversupply of lawyers, following graduation from Moscow State, “and this in the planned society of the 1950s USSR”, as he recalls with irony in his memoire, Chikvaidze soon returned to Georgia, and was offered a succession of fairly boring, as he recalls, Komsomol jobs, in April 1956 as secretary of the Komsomol committee of Tbilisi Airport, in May 1956 as secretary of the Komsomol committee of Tbilisi Agricultural Institute and then, in June 1956, as Head of the student department of Ordzhonikidze district Komsomol committee in Tbilisi, followed by a promotion in 1961 to the post of first secretary of the Tbilisi city Komsomol committee.

Following his postgraduate studies at the Soviet Academy of Social Sciences in Moscow in 1964–1966, Chikvaidze briefly returned to Tbilisi to his old job at the central committee of the Communist Party of Georgia, but soon thereafter in 1967, he left with his family for his first posting abroad – his true calling and interest – as vice consul in charge of cultural affairs at the Soviet consulate general in Bombay, India.

In early 1969, for good work and due to the health of his family, Chikvaidze was transferred as First Secretary of the USSR Embassy in London, in charge of cultural affairs and public diplomacy. He returned to Tbilisi in September 1972 and was appointed in early 1973 to head the Department of Administrative and Commercial Authority of the Tbilisi city committee of the Communist Party.

In 1973–1977, Chikvaidze served as first secretary of the Tbilisi Ordzhonikidze district committee of the Communist Party and, from 1977 to September 1978 as minister for publishing, polygraphy and book trade of Georgia.

Chikvaidze renounced his ministerial portfolio in October 1978 in favour of a special two-year international relations course for senior government officials at the USSR Diplomatic Academy in Moscow, graduating within one year and, in 1979, was named USSR Consul General in San Francisco. His arrival in San Francisco in September was followed in December by the Soviet invasion of Afghanistan and the final demise of US-Soviet détente that had marked the beginning of the 1970s. Despite this new spike in the Cold War, when Chikvaidze's tour of duty came to an end in 1983, he was given a farewell lunch by the City of San Francisco aboard the USS Coral Sea, a venerable aircraft carrier, known as ‘San Francisco’s Own’.

In 1983, Chikvaidze was promoted to the rank of Ambassador Extraordinary and Plenipotentiary and assigned as the Soviet ambassador to Kenya and Permanent Representative of the USSR to the United Nations Environment Programme and to the United Nations Centre for Human Settlements (Habitat) where he served until 1985, returning to Moscow as Head of section in the department of diplomatic appointments of the USSR communist party central committee.

In 1988, Chikvaidze was assigned as Ambassador Extraordinary and Plenipotentiary of the Soviet Union to the Kingdom of the Netherlands. After the dissolution of the Soviet Union as of 1 January 1992, Chikvaidze remained in post and presented his Credentials again to HM Queen Beatrix of the Netherlands, this time as Ambassador of the Russian Federation.

In February 1992, Chikvaidze was appointed Vice Prime Minister and Minister of Foreign Affairs of Georgia by acting Prime Minister Tengiz Sigua. From 1992 through 1995 Chikvaidze served as Minister of Foreign Affairs of Georgia. In 1996, Georgian president Eduard Shevardnadze reassigned Chikvaidze as Ambassador Extraordinary and Plenipotentiary of Georgia to Greece and, then, in 2002, as Ambassador Extraordinary and Plenipotentiary of Georgia to Switzerland, to the Holy See and as Permanent Representative of Georgia to the United Nations Office and other International Organizations in Geneva.

== Role of chess in his career and life ==
Chikvaidze had a lifelong love affair with chess, so much so, that he often wondered if chess was a hobby of his, or a calling. At the age of fifteen, he became champion of the Tbilisi ‘Pioneer Palace,’ a title held the previous two years by his friend and future world chess champion Tigran Petrosian. Chess was part of his political and diplomatic career. He would conduct simultaneous play tournaments on twenty and more boards, instantly becoming a celebrity in his country of posting. Chikvaidze was twice elected president of the Georgian Chess Federation, from 1973 to 1975 and again from 1992 to 1996.

In 1986, he was elected President of the USSR Chess Federation and served in that position until 1988. This was unusual, a Georgian being selected for such a high-visibility position of very high responsibility and national prestige. Chikvaidze soon found himself tested precisely in that manner, when he had to manage Team USSR's precarious situation during the 27th International Chess Olympiad in Dubai, which he managed to turn around and have his team snatch victory.

Don Schultz, former president of the United States Chess Federation made this entry in his scrapbook from those dramatic events: “Alexander Chikvaidze had just recently succeeded Vitaly Sevastyanov as President of USSR Chess Federation. He was the highest Soviet official ever to serve in this capacity. Back in Moscow his job was Head of the Department of the Central Committee of the Communist Party. One of his responsibilities is the appointment of ambassadors and other officials of state. Chikvaidze came to Dubai to relax and revel in an expected Soviet Championship. When the US team beat the Soviets he viewed the defeat as a personal embarrassment. He did not want to be part of the all-time biggest upset of a Soviet chess team. He called the Soviet team together and gave them a pep talk. Chikvaidze did not limit his involvement to just the Soviet players. He apparently gave a pep talk to the Bulgarian team just before their 14th round match with the Americans. He warned them against any game throwing to the US team. The Soviets, on the other hand, won all their final round games against Poland, and many questioned if the Poles had thrown the match. As a result, the Soviet team trailing the Americans by a full points after twelve rounds and by a half point after thirteen rounds won the Olympiad. Chikvaidze returned triumphantly to Moscow”.

== Later life and death ==
After his retirement in 2005, Chikvaidze remained active, translating from Georgian and publishing his memoir in Russian, engaged in a teaching career, lecturing on the art and practice of diplomacy at the Georgian Diplomatic Academy, which he founded, and at the Tbilisi Polytechnic University.

He died in 2012. The obituary on the Ministry of Foreign Affairs of Georgia's website read: “Mr. Chikvaidze's contribution to the establishment of the Georgian Foreign Ministry as a modern organization was particularly noteworthy, for it was he who oversaw the opening of independent Georgia's first diplomatic missions abroad as well as the country's representation in international organizations. It was during these years that Georgia joined the United Nations and became a fully-fledged member of the international community”.

== Legacy ==
Chikvaidze, the first professional diplomat to serve as foreign minister of independent Georgia, is credited with contributing to the development of Georgia's modern diplomatic service and with recruiting and mentoring early-career diplomats during the initial period of the country's independence.

Chikvaidze signing Georgia's accession to the Partnership for Peace Framework Agreement in Brussels, 23 March 1994

He was instrumental in founding the Georgian Diplomatic Academy with Professor Soso Tsintsadze and was elected Honorary president of the academy on its tenth anniversary in 2005.

Chikvaidze made history by being the only person in recent memory to serve as ambassador of three countries: he was twice ambassador of the Soviet Union, in Kenya from 1983 to 1985 and the Netherlands from 1988 to 1991, briefly for just under two months, ambassador of the Russian Federation in the Netherlands in 1992, after the dissolution of the USSR and, after leaving the foreign minister post, served as Georgian ambassador to Greece, to the Holy See, to Switzerland and as Permanent Representative of Georgia to the United Nations Office at Geneva, from 1996 to 2005.

In 2017, the Tbilisi City Council voted to have a street named after him in Tbilisi, and a memorial plaque placed on the building where he lived the last twenty years of his life. A Memorial chess tournament was held the same year at the National Youth Palace Chess School of which he was champion seventy years before, in 1947. In 2018 the Georgian Chess Federation named its Annual Federation Cup among 8-12-year-old boys and girls for Alexander Chikvaidze.

== Quotations ==
- “Small states can sometimes be pawns in big politics. But only in chess can you sacrifice a pawn, not in real life and not in our century.”
  - From statement following the signing for Georgia of the NATO Partnership for Peace Framework Document, Brussels, 23 March 1994
- “A small country cannot afford to make big mistakes.”
  - From statement following the signing for Georgia of the NATO Partnership for Peace Framework Document, Brussels, 23 March 1994
- “How is it, that when a Russian loves his country, it is considered patriotism, but when a Georgian loves his country, it is considered nationalism?”
  - From a statement at a press conference in Moscow in 1994
- “Real business is not merely buying and selling. Production is key, when you build an enterprise, which tomorrow will produce quality goods consistent with international standards that you can then sell.”
  - From an interview to the Greek magazine Business with Russia, June 1996
- “The very essence of Georgian foreign policy is to achieve close, friendly relations with all the countries of the world, especially those in our vicinity”.
  - From an interview to the magazine Greek Diplomatic Life, June 1997.
- “There are two places in the world where I don’t feel like a foreigner: New York and Greece. New York, because everybody in that city is a foreigner, and Greece, because it is so much like my home country”.
  - From the newspaper Athens News, 3 August 2001
- “The tragedy in Abkhazia has been repeatedly and rightfully assessed by the OSCE as "ethnic cleansing". To the astonishment of the Georgian people, the United Nations has been reluctant to make the same obvious assessment.”
  - From the statement to the 59th session of the United Nations Commission on Human Rights, HR/CN/1015, 2 April 2003
- “A person is happy when he truly loves his profession. He is happy, when he is eager to go to work and equally eager to return home to his family in the evening. The greatest happiness is when one sees the positive results of one’s efforts; positive results for one’s country, one’s family and everyone.”
  - Чикваидзе, А., На изломе истории. СССР-Россия-Грузия, p. 302-303.
- “He, who knows how to get things done, gets them done; he, who knows not how to get things done, gives advice to others.”
  - ჩიკვაიძე, ა., პროფესიის სიყვარული.
