= Zaza Kandelaki =

Georgian politician and diplomat (born 1958)

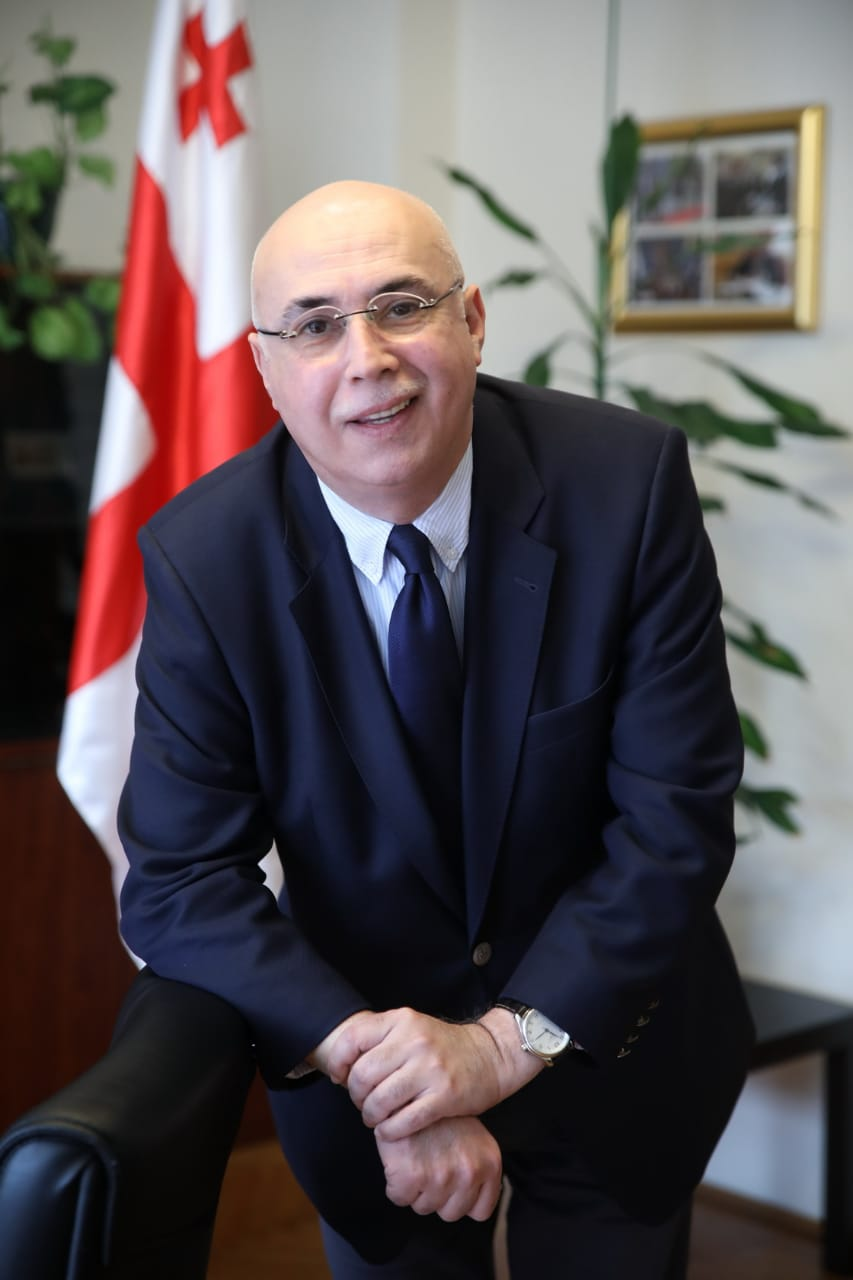
Zaza Kandelaki, 2025.

Zaza Kandelaki (in Georgian: ზაზა კანდელაკი) is a Georgian diplomat and the current Ambassador of Georgia to the State of Israel. Kandelaki was born on January 28, 1958, in Tbilisi, the capital of Georgia.

== Education and academic career ==
Kandelaki holds a PhD in history from Tbilisi State University. From 1981 to 1987, he worked as a junior researcher at the Georgian National Museum. In 1987, he became a senior researcher and later, from 1989 to 1991, served as head of the museum's department.

== Diplomatic career ==
From 2024 to present, he has served as Ambassador Extraordinary and Plenipotentiary to the State of Israel. Between October 25, 2018, and 2024, he was appointed Ambassador Extraordinary and Plenipotentiary of Georgia to the Hashemite Kingdom of Jordan, also serving as Non-resident ambassador to the Republic of Iraq and the Republic of Lebanon. From June 5, 2013, until October 1, 2018, he was Ambassador Extraordinary and Plenipotentiary of Georgia to Hungary, concurrently acting as Non-Resident Ambassador to the Republic of Croatia and Montenegro. Prior to that, between 2007 and 2013, he engaged in private business in Georgia. From 2005 to 2006, he held the position of Ambassador Extraordinary and Plenipotentiary of Georgia to the Republic of Poland.

Earlier in his career, from 2003 to 2004, he was Deputy Minister of Foreign Affairs of Georgia, following his role as Ambassador at Large at the Ministry of Foreign Affairs between 1999 and 2003. Between 1995 and 1999, he served as a member of parliament of Georgia and Coordinator of Permanent Parliamentary Delegations. From 1994 to 1995, he acted as International Secretary of the Citizens Union of Georgia, after serving as Press secretary to the Head of State of Georgia from 1993 to 1994. In 1992–1993, he worked as State Adviser in the Staff of the Head of state of Georgia on National security Issues, and in 1992, he began his diplomatic career as Deputy Director of the Political Department at the Ministry of Foreign Affairs of Georgia.

In 1991, Kandelaki began his government and diplomatic career. He was appointed Second Secretary of the Political Department of the Georgian foreign ministry, and later that year he was promoted to First Secretary of the Department. In 1992, he was appointed Head of the First European Department and Deputy Director of the Political Department of the Georgian Foreign Ministry.

== The Service in Hungary ==
While serving in Hungary, Kandelaki publicly addressed matters related to Georgia–Russia relations, advocating for a strategic balance favoring closer ties with the United States. He asserted that Russia's demand to recognize Georgian territories as independent states is unacceptable to the Georgian people and constitutes a red line in foreign policy.

== The Service in the Hashemite Kingdom of Jordan ==
In 2018, Kandelaki presented his credentials to King Abdullah II. During his tenure, and with the support of King Abdullah, Prince Ghazi bin Mohammed, and Greek Orthodox Patriarch Theophilos III, Georgia was granted 4,000 square meters of land on the banks of the Jordan River, near the Baptism Site of Jesus, for the construction of a Georgian Cultural Center.

The Georgian prime minister later expressed his gratitude to Kandelaki and his team for their efforts. Together, they reviewed the newly allocated site.
