= Dimitri Tskitishvili =

Eorgian economist, diplomat, and politician

- დიმიტრი ცქიტიშვილი

Member of the Parliament of Georgia
- In office 2016–2020
- Constituency: Georgian Dream party list

Deputy Chairman of the Foreign Relations Committee
- In office 2016–2019

Personal details
- Born: 24 July 1975 (age 51) Tbilisi, Georgian SSR, Soviet Union
- Party: Georgian Dream—Democratic Georgia (until 2019) [ Independent (2019–present)
- Education: Tbilisi State Institute of Economic Relations (BA) University of Wyoming (MA, International Studies)
- Profession: Economist, Diplomat, Politician

Dimitri Tskitishvili (Georgian: დიმიტრი ცქიტიშვილი; born 24 July 1975) is a Georgian economist, diplomat, and politician. He served as a member of the Parliament of Georgia from 2016 to 2020, elected on the party list of the ruling Georgian Dream—Democratic Georgia bloc. During his term, he held the position of Deputy Chairman of the Foreign Relations Committee.

Tskitishvili left the Georgian Dream party in November 2019.In 2024 he ran as a non-partisan candidate on the proportional party list of For Georgia, but later departing due to strategic disagreements.

== Early life and career ==
Dimitri Tskitishvili was born on 24 July 1975 in Tbilisi. He earned a bachelor's degree from the [Tbilisi State Institute of Economic Relations] and a master's degree in International Studies and Foreign Policy from the University of Wyoming in the United States. Before entering parliament, he built a career in diplomacy and international relations. From 1998 to 2004, he worked as an advisor in the State Bureau for Relations with the Commonwealth of Independent States (CIS) and later served in various positions within the Ministry of Foreign Affairs of Georgia, including within the Russia Department. He was also deeply involved in socialist youth politics, serving as Vice President of the International Union of Socialist Youth (IUSY) and as president of the Young Socialists of Georgia from 2008 to 2012.

=== Political career ===
Tskitishvili was elected to the 9th parliament of Georgia in 2016. As a member of the ruling Georgian Dream party, he was appointed Deputy Chairman of the Foreign Relations Committee and also served on the Gender Equality Council and the Human Rights and Civil Integration Committee. He was the head of the Georgian Dream party's international relations department, where he worked to build ties with European political parties.

In 2018, he was appointed as a member of a special interim parliamentary commission investigating the controversial Khorava street murders of two teenagers.

=== Departure from Georgian Dream and opposition activity ===
In November 2019, Tskitishvili left the Georgian Dream parliamentary faction, continuing his work as an independent MP. In a 2024 interview, he stated his departure was prompted by the party's shift toward "anti-Western rhetoric" and its prioritization of retaining power, which he felt betrayed the pro-European and democratic values he originally joined to promote.

From 2020 to 2024, he chaired the social democratic think tank Georgian Progressive Forum, which primarily focused on research and advocacy in the fields of social policy and labor rights. He also provided consultancy services to various international organizations in Georgia during the process of preparing social protection system reforms.

In 2024, he ran as a non-partisan candidate on the proportional party list of For Georgia. However, due to the political boycott, he declined to take up his parliamentary mandate. Later, in October 2025, he ended his cooperation with the party due to strategic disagreements, citing a "fundamental difference" over its decision to participate in that year's local elections. Tskitishvili argued that participation without a coordinated opposition strategy and a real chance to challenge the government would not serve the goal of returning Georgia to a democratic path.
