= Wardrop dialogue =

Series of high-end annual meetings between Georgia and the UK

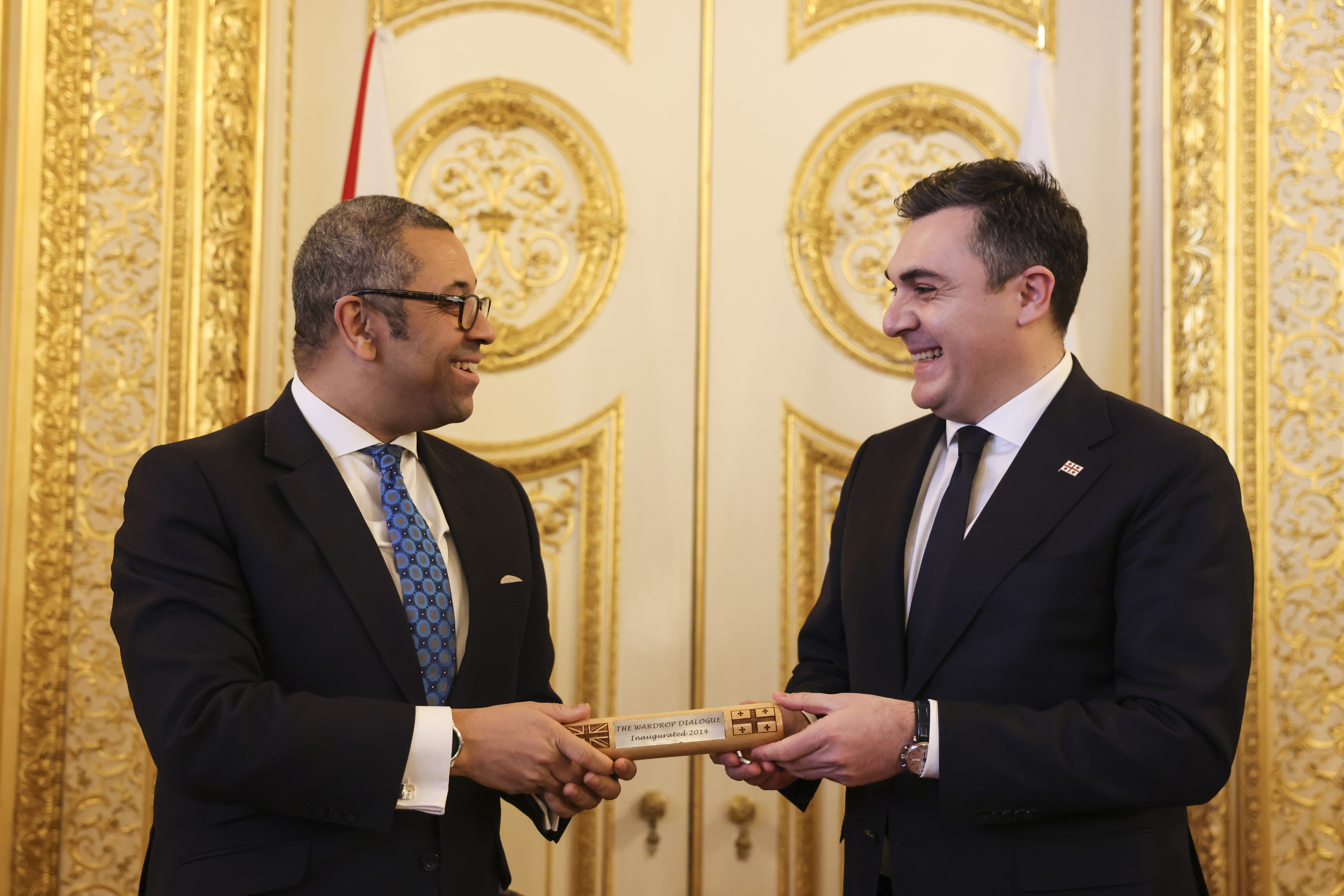
Foreign Secretary James Cleverly and Foreign Minister Ilia Darchiashvili with the Wardrop Baton during the eighth round of the dialogue at Lancaster House in 2023

The United Kingdom–Georgia Strategic Dialogue, also known as Wardrop Dialogue, is a high-level, annual strategic dialogue format between Georgia and United Kingdom that serves to address a wide range of co-operation issues, including foreign, security, and defense policy, as well as economy and trade. The inaugural session of the dialogue was held in November 2014 in London during Foreign Minister Tamar Beruchashvili's visit in the UK. The meetings are held once a year, in London and Tbilisi alternatively.

The dialogue bears the name of Sir Oliver Wardrop, British diplomat who served as a first chief commissioner of the UK to Transcaucasia in 1919–20. He founded Kartvelian studies at Oxford University, was fluent in the Georgian language and published several books about the country.
