= Murman Omanidze =

Georgian politician (1938–2020)

- მურმან ომანიძე

Member of the Parliament of Georgia
- In office 1992–1998
- Constituency: Rustavi

Minister of Foreign Affairs
- In office August 1991 – December 1991
- President: Zviad Gamsakhurdia
- Prime Minister: Tengiz Sigua
- Preceded by: Giorgi Khoshtaria
- Succeeded by: Alexander Chikvaidze

Prime Minister of Georgia Acting
- In office 18 August 1991 – 23 August 1991
- President: Zviad Gamsakhurdia
- Preceded by: Tengiz Sigua
- Succeeded by: Besarion Gugushvili

Personal details
- Born: 5 November 1938 Tbilisi, Soviet Union (Now Georgia)
- Died: 20 November 2020 (aged 82) Saint Petersburg, Russia
- Party: Independent
- Education: Tbilisi State University

Murman Omanidze (Georgian: მურმან ომანიძე; 5 November 1938 – 20 November 2020) was a Georgian politician and the Minister of Foreign Affairs of Georgia in 1991.

== Career ==
Born in Tbilisi, Omanidze graduated from the Faculty of International Law, Tbilisi State University. He headed a legal department of the state-run agricultural company Suplmsheni from 1977 to 1985 and worked as a manager at the Ministry of Construction of the Georgian SSR from 1985 to 1989. During the rise of anti-Soviet and independence movement, Omanidze joined the Afghan Union of Georgia, an organization of the Georgian veterans of the Soviet–Afghan War, being its deputy chairman from 1990 to 1991. He became part of the government of Georgia as Deputy Minister of Transportation from March to May 1991. In a newly independent Georgia, Omanidze was appointed by President Zviad Gamsakhurdia as First Deputy Prime Minister and Minister of Foreign Affairs in August 1991. That same month, he was briefly an acting Prime Minister following the scandalous resignation of Tengiz Sigua.

During the August 1991 Soviet coup d'état attempt, the opposition in Georgia alleged that Omanidze traveled to Moscow to meet members of the State Committee on the State of Emergency. After the coup collapsed, the Georgian leadership strongly denied such allegations. The opposition launched a military coup against Gamsakhurdia in December 1991. During the fighting in Tbilisi, Gamsakhurdia summoned Omanidze to a government house bunker, where he had entrenched himself against the rebel assaults. Omanidze was effectively placed under arrest and removed from his positions on 31 December. Omanidze succeeded in escaping to Russia on 4 January and denounced Gamsakhurdia as a dictator.

After Gamsakhurdia's flight from Georgia and Eduard Shevardnadze's accession to power, Omanidze was a member of the Parliament of Georgia from 1992 to 1998. He was also involved in several businesses. In 1996, the Georgian prosecutor’s office issued a warrant for the arrest of Omanidze on charges of illicit financial dealings. He managed to leave Georgia and distanced himself from politics.

== Death ==
He died on 20 November 2020, from complications of COVID-19 at a Hospital in Saint Petersburg during the COVID-19 pandemic in Russia, where he had lived the last 15 years of his life.
