= Giorgi Javakhishvili =

Georgian academic, politician, and diplomat

Giorgi Javakhishvili გიორგი ჯავახიშვილი

Minister of Foreign Affairs
- In office 1985–1990
- Preceded by: Teimuraz Gordeladze
- Succeeded by: Giorgi Khoshtaria

Personal details
- Born: 10 June 1941 (age 85) Tbilisi, Soviet Union (Now Georgia)
- Party: Communist Party of the Georgian SSR
- Education: Tbilisi State University
- Profession: Journalist

Giorgi Javakhishvili (Georgian: გიორგი ჯავახიშვილი; Russian: Георгий Дмитриевич Джавахишвили; born June 10, 1941) is a Georgian academic, politician, and diplomat. He served as Foreign Minister of Georgia in the closing years of the Soviet era from 1985 to 1990. He is ranked as First Class Extraordinary and Plenipotentiary Envoy.

== Biography ==
Javakhishvili was born in Tbilisi, Georgian SSR, in 1941 and graduated from the Faculty of Journalism, Tbilisi State University, in 1965. From 1965 to 1979, he was part of the faculty at his alma mater, eventually as a professor at the Faculty of Journalism. As a Communist Party activist, he served as a First Deputy Chief of Department of Agitation and Propaganda of Central Committee of Georgian Communist Party from 1979 to 1982. Javakhishvili was then rector of the State Pedagogical Institute of Foreign Languages of Tbilisi, one of the predecessors of the current Ilia State University, from 1983 to 1985 and Minister of Foreign Affairs of the Georgian SSR from 1985 to 1990.

=== Foreign minister ===
As a minister, Javakhishvili pushed for the efforts to obtain greater autonomy from the Soviet Ministry of Foreign Affairs and upgrade the Georgian diplomatic service. During his tenure, Georgia vitalized contacts with Israel, Turkey, UNESCO, and UNIDO, opened quasi-missions in Germany, Belgium, Switzerland, and Austria, and became the first Soviet republic to join the Assembly of European Regions. He was succeeded by Giorgi Khoshtaria in 1990.
