= Tamar Beruchashvili =

Georgian diplomat and politician

- თამარ ბერუჩაშვილი
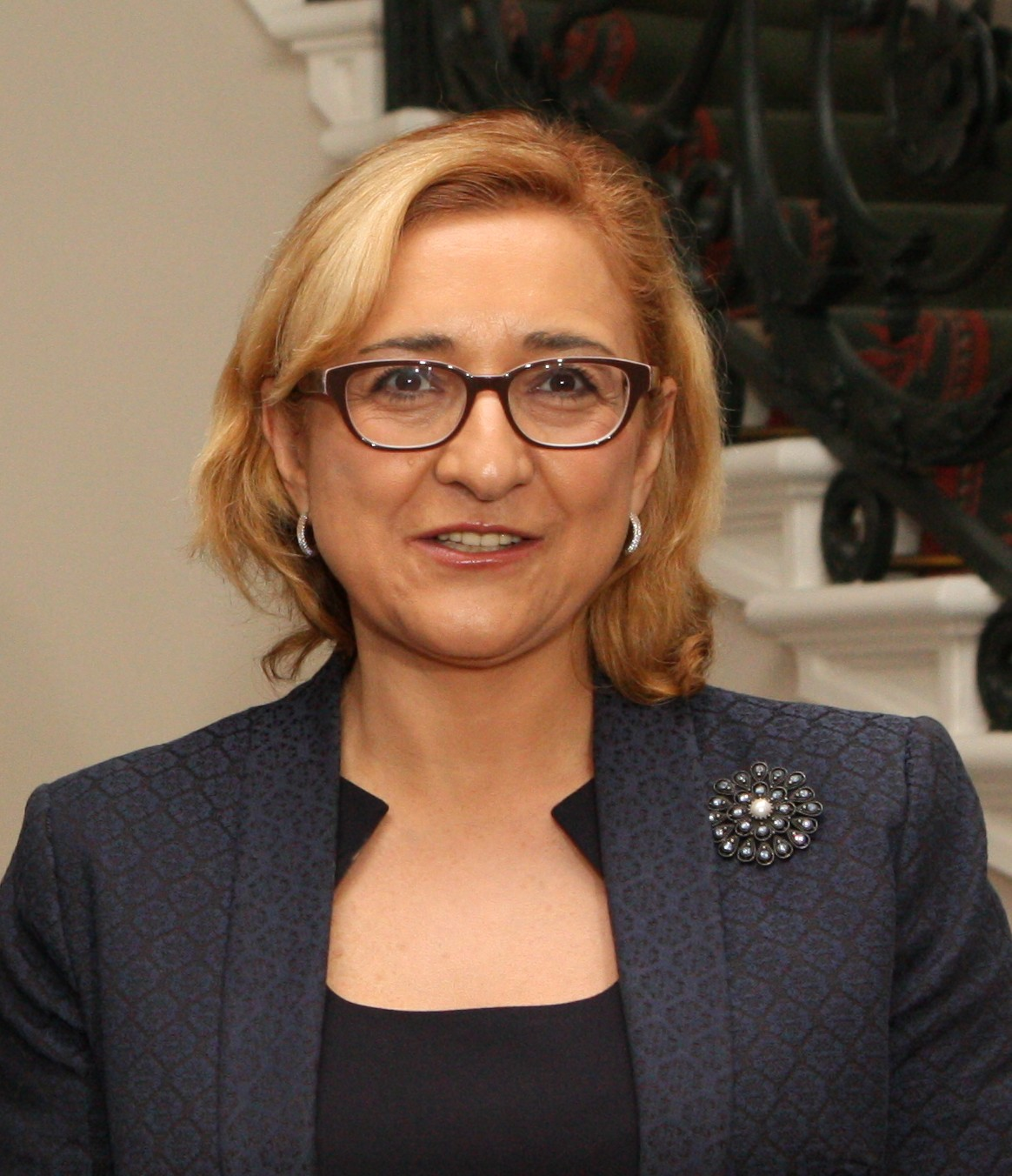
- Beruchashvili in 2014

Ambassador of Georgia to the United Kingdom
- In office March 2016 – April 2020
- Prime Minister: Giorgi Kvirikashvili; Mamuka Bakhtadze; Giorgi Gakharia
- Preceded by: Revaz Gachechiladze
- Succeeded by: Sophie Katsarava

Minister of Foreign Affairs
- In office 11 November 2014 – 1 September 2015
- Prime Minister: Irakli Garibashvili
- Preceded by: Maia Panjikidze
- Succeeded by: Giorgi Kvirikashvili

State Minister for Euro-Atlantic Integration
- In office 17 February 2004 – 27 December 2004
- President: Mikheil Saakashvili
- Preceded by: Position established
- Succeeded by: Giorgi Baramidze

Personal details
- Born: 9 April 1961 (age 65) Tbilisi, Georgia SSR, Soviet Union (now Georgia)
- Party: None
- Children: 2
- Education: Peoples' Friendship University; Indiana University, Bloomington; Tbilisi State University

Tamar Beruchashvili (Georgian: თამარ ბერუჩაშვილი; born 9 April 1961) is a Georgian diplomat and politician currently serving as Georgian Ambassador to Romania. Previously she served as the Georgian Ambassador to the United Kingdom between 2016 and 2020, and was the Minister of Foreign Affairs, a position she held from 11 November 2014 until 1 September 2015. Before that she was Minister of Trade and Foreign Economic Relations from 1998 until 2000 and Minister of Euro-Atlantic Integration in 2004. She also worked as Deputy Minister of Foreign Affairs from 2000 to 2003 and again from 2013 until her appointment as minister in 2014. Beruchashvili also worked as a professor at Tbilisi State University from 2000 until 2010. She was appointed Minister of Foreign Affairs on 11 November 2014, and held that post until 1 September 2015, when she was replaced by Giorgi Kvirikashvili. Beruchashvili was later appointed the new Georgian Ambassador to the United Kingdom from 2016 to 2020.

== Education ==
Between 1978 and 1985, she pursued her studies at Patrice Lumumba Peoples' Friendship University of Russia. She enrolled in the Faculty of Physics, Mathematics, and Natural Sciences, as well as the Faculty of Foreign Languages, where she studied French. Through her academic endeavors, she obtained qualifications as a chemist-researcher, teacher for secondary and higher education levels, and a translator.

From 1996 to 1998, she attended Indiana State University in Bloomington, USA, where she studied at the Faculty of International and Comparative Relations. In 1998, she obtained a Master of Public Administration (MPA) degree.

Between 2002 and 2006, she pursued post-graduate studies at the Faculty of Economics at Ivane Javakhishvili Tbilisi State University. During this period, she earned a Doctor of Economics qualification.

Concurrently, from 2002 to 2006, she undertook professional training in commercial diplomacy at Carleton University in Ottawa, Canada.

== Family ==
She is married and has two children.

Political offices
Preceded by Maia Panjikidze	Minister of Foreign Affairs; 2014–2015	Succeeded by Giorgi Kvirikashvili
