= Giorgi Khoshtaria =

Georgian art historian and politician (born 1938)

Giorgi Khoshtaria გიორგი ხოშტარია

1st Minister of Foreign Affairs of Georgia
- In office November 1990 – August 1991
- President: Zviad Gamsakhurdia
- Prime Minister: Tengiz Sigua
- Preceded by: Giorgi Javakhishvili
- Succeeded by: Murman Omanidze

Personal details
- Born: 4 October 1938 (age 87) Tbilisi, Soviet Union (Now Georgia)
- Education: Tbilisi State University
- Profession: Art historian

Giorgi "Gogi" Khoshtaria (Georgian: გიორგი "გოგი" ხოშტარია; born 4 October 1938) is a Georgian art historian and former politician who served as the first Minister of Foreign Affairs of post-Soviet Georgia from November 1990 to August 1991. He is ranked as First Class Extraordinary and Plenipotentiary Envoy.

== Career ==
Gogi Khoshtaria was born in Tbilisi in the family of Georgian intelligentsia. His father, Metode Khoshtaria (1911–1938), a highway engineer and a nephew of the wealthy entrepreneur and philanthropist Akaki Khoshtaria, was shot at the age of 27 during the Great Purge. His mother, Tinatin Virsaladze (1907–1985), was an art historian. Gogi Khoshtaria was also trained as an art historian at the Tbilisi State University and pursued an academic career. In the 1980s, he joined the dissident movement and became closely associated with Zviad Gamsakhurdia, who became the first post-Communist leader of Georgia and made Khoshtaria Minister of Foreign Affairs on November 26, 1990.

As a foreign minister, Khoshtaria met with the Soviet Foreign Minister Alexander Bessmertnykh twice after Georgia's declaration of independence in April 1991, but the relations between Moscow and Tbilisi became increasingly tense and the contacts between the two ministries ceased by mid-1991. Khoshtaria worked with the Turkish government for closer Georgian–Turkish relations and resisted the Soviet attempts to bring these ties under control. He also visited Germany and France in April and the United States in June 1991 to further the Georgian independence cause and lobby for closer economic relations. Despite his efforts, Khoshtaria became alienated from Gamsakhurdia and was dismissed in August 1991. He cited Gamsakhurdia's authoritarian tendencies and failure to immediately denounce the 1991 Soviet coup d'état attempt as the reasons behind the split.

After his retirement, Khoshtaria resumed his academic career. He lectures at several other academia and is a frequent commentator on culture and monument protection. Has a daughter, Elene Khoshtaria.
