= Irakli Menagarishvili =

Georgian politician

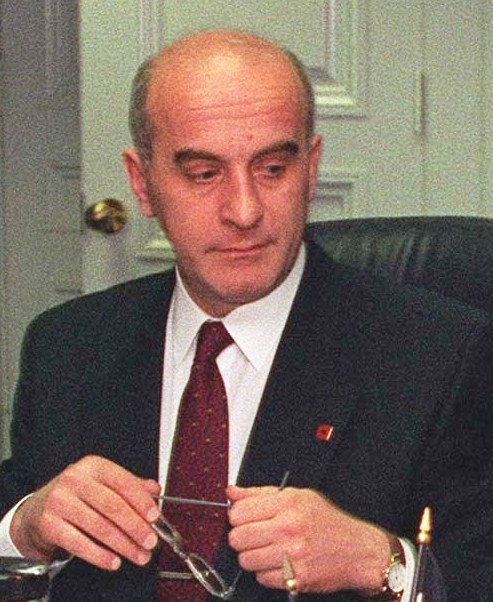

4th Minister of Foreign Affairs of Georgia
- In office 15 December 1995 – 29 November 2003
- President: Eduard Shevardnadze; Nino Burjanadze (acting)
- Preceded by: Aleksandre Chikvaidze
- Succeeded by: Tedo Japaridze

Minister of Health of the Republic of Georgia
- In office 1 November 1992 – 1 September 1993
- Preceded by: Manana Dzodzuashvili
- Succeeded by: Avtandil Jorbenadze
- In office 1 January 1986 – 1 January 1991 (As Minister of Health of Georgian SSR)
- Preceded by: Gela Lejava
- Succeeded by: Position abolished; Manana Dzodzuashvili as Minister of Health of the Republic of Georgia

Member of the State Council of the Republic of Georgia Coordinator of the International Humanitarian Assistance
- In office 1 May 1992 – 1 November 1992

Personal details
- Born: May 18, 1951 (age 75) Tbilisi, Georgian SSR (now Georgia
- Children: 2
- Education: Tbilisi State Medical University

Irakli Menagarishvili (Georgian: ირაკლი მენაღარიშვილი) (born May 18, 1951) is a Georgian politician and diplomat.

Menagarishvili was born in Tbilisi, capital of Georgia (then the Georgian SSR, Soviet Union).

Menagarishvili graduated from Tbilisi State Medical Institute in 1974. During the presidency of Eduard Shevardnadze, he served as Minister of Foreign Affairs of Georgia, from 1995 to 2003. Past positions have included Deputy Prime Minister (1993-1995), Minister of Public Health (1986-1991, 1992-1993) and Coordinator of the International Humanitarian Assistance at the State Council of the Republic of Georgia (1992).

Political offices
Preceded by Alexander Chikvaidze	Minister of Foreign Affairs of Georgia; 1995 – 2003	Succeeded by Tedo Japaridze
