= Sophie Katsarava =

Georgian politician

Sophie Katsarava MBE
- სოფიო ქაცარავა
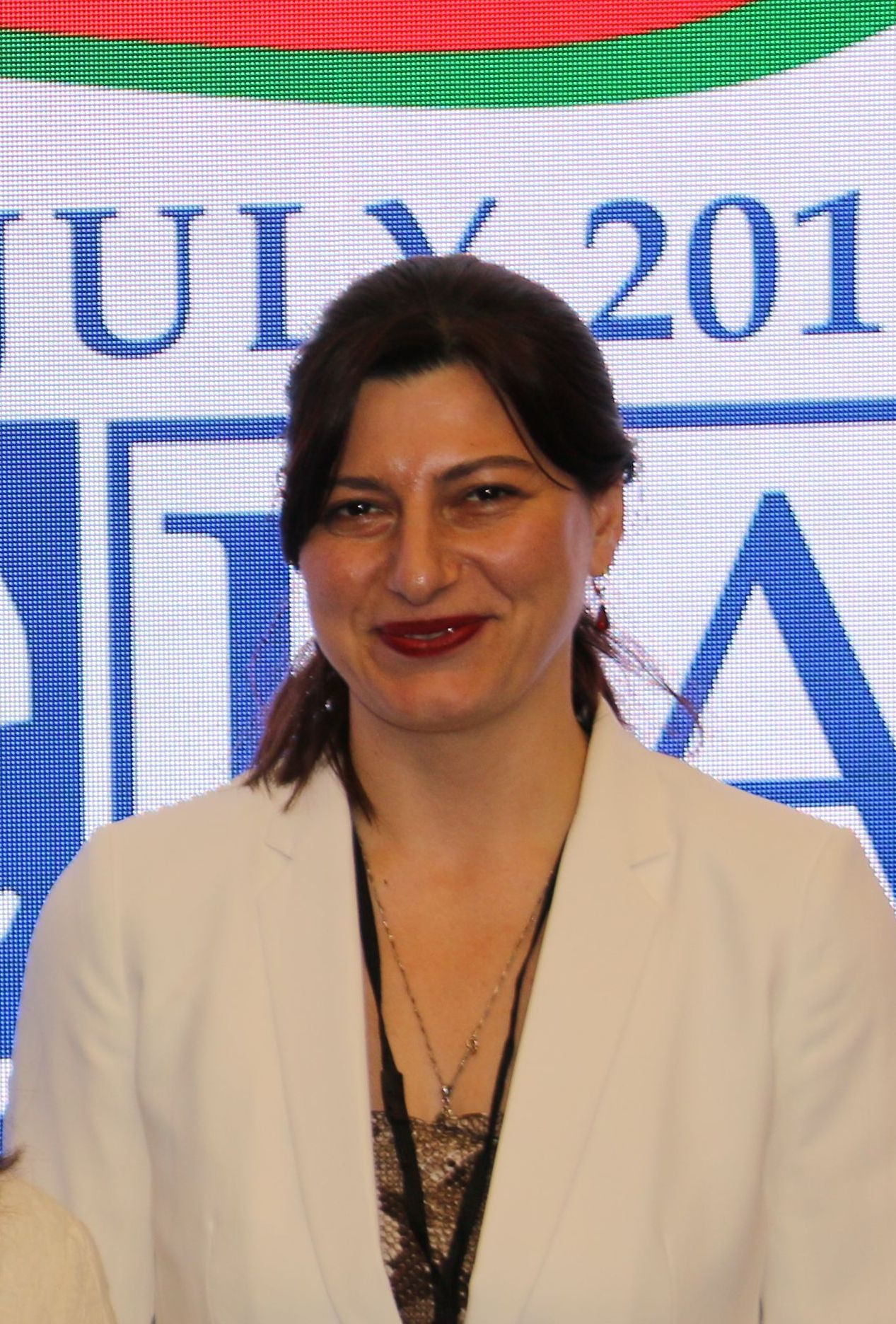

Ambassador of Georgia to the United Kingdom
- In office April 2020 – October 2024
- President: Salome Zourabichvili
- Preceded by: Tamar Beruchashvili
- Succeeded by: Ilia Darchiashvili

Member of Parliament
- In office 18 November 2016 – 10 December 2019

Personal details
- Born: December 8, 1976 (age 49) Tbilisi, Georgia
- Education: Ilia State University

Sophie Katsarava MBE (Georgian: სოფიო ქაცარავა, Sofio Katsarava, born 8 December 1976), is a Georgian politician, diplomat and philologist. She has been serving as the Georgian Ambassador to Ireland since May 2025. Between 2020 and 2024 she was Georgian Ambassador to the United Kingdom. Between 2016 and 2019 she was a Georgian Dream Member of the Parliament of Georgia.

== Early life and education ==
Born in 1976 in Tbilisi, Georgia, Katsarava studied English Language and Literature at Tbilisi's Ilia Chavchavadze State University of Language and Culture, graduating in 1999.

== Career ==
Having worked as press and public relations project manager at World Wildlife Fund from 1997 to 2004, Katsarava joined the British Embassy in Tbilisi in 2005, where her roles included Project Manager, Head of Press and Public Relations, and ultimately Political Secretary. She led the embassy's Chevening Scholarship programme.

In 2016, Katsarava joined the Georgian Dream party as an advisor in the Department for International Relations, moving on to become a Member of the Parliament of Georgia on 18 November 2016. During her tenure she was Chairman of the Foreign Affairs Committee, as well as Chairman of the Friendship Group with the United Kingdom, and Chairman of the Parliamentary Dimension of the Wardrop Strategic Dialogue between Georgia and the United Kingdom. In November 2019 she left the Georgian Dream party and her position in parliament.

In April 2020 Katsarava became Georgian Ambassador to the United Kingdom. She stepped down as ambassador in October 2024.

== Awards ==
In 2016, having served 11 years at the British Embassy in Tbilisi, Katsarava was appointed as Honorary Member of the Most Excellent Order of the British Empire (MBE), in recognition of her outstanding contribution to strengthening relations between Georgia and the United Kingdom in the education sector.
