= Revenue stamps of Batum =

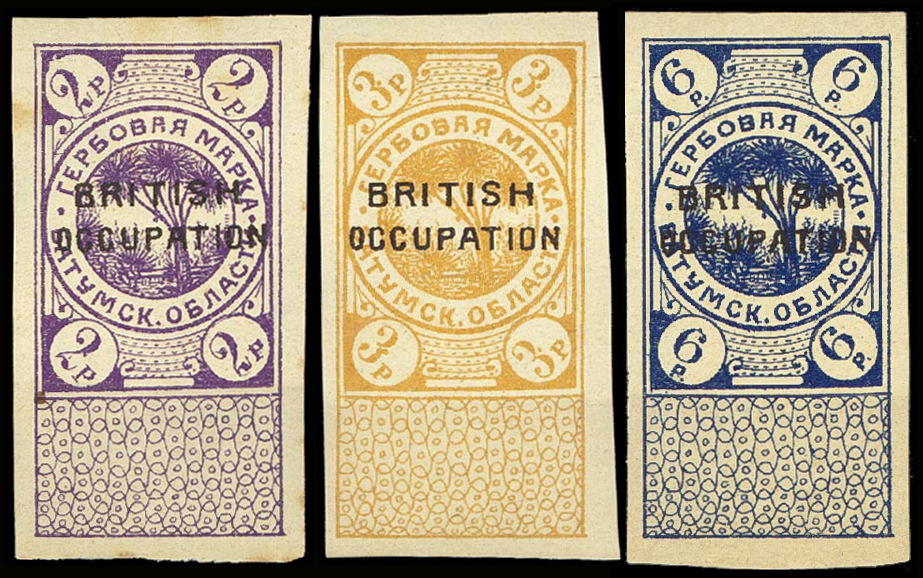
Revenues of Batum

The city of Batum (now Batumi) in modern-day Georgia issued revenue stamps in 1918 while under British occupation. A set of 7 from 20k to 30R was originally issued, and this was later overprinted BRITISH OCCUPATION. The 20k was later also surcharged 20 руб., for 20 rubles.

== See also ==
- Postage stamps of Batum under British occupation
