= Tedo Japaridze =

Georgian politician and diplomat

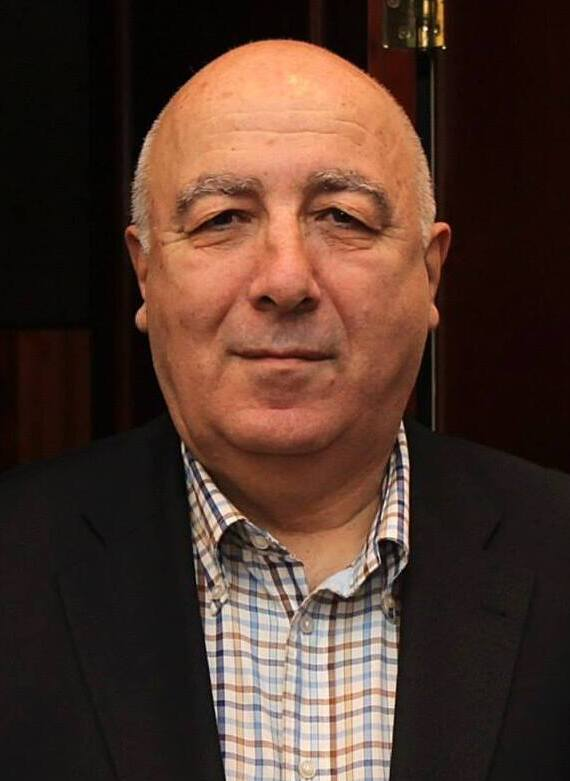
- Japaridze in 2013

Minister of Foreign Affairs of Georgia
- In office 30 November 2003 – 20 March 2004
- President: Nino Burjanadze (acting); Mikheil Saakashvili
- Preceded by: Irakli Menagarishvili
- Succeeded by: Salome Zurabishvili

Member of the Parliament of Georgia
- In office 21 October 2012 – 18 November 2016

Personal details
- Born: 18 September 1946 (age 80)
- Education: Tbilisi State University

Tedo Japaridze (Georgian: თედო ჯაფარიძე) (born 18 September 1946) is a Georgian politician and diplomat.

== Biography ==
Japaridze was born in Tbilisi, capital of Georgia (then the Georgian SSR, Soviet Union). He graduated from the Department of Western European Languages and Literature at Tbilisi State University in 1971 and worked there until 1974. He then studied and worked at the Institute for the USA and Canada Studies of the Soviet Union Academy of Sciences from 1974 to 1989. Returning to Georgia, he then worked for the Foreign Ministry of Georgia and was appointed as Deputy Foreign Minister in August 1991. He served as Deputy Chair of the National Security Council from November 1992 to June 1994, and as Ambassador of Georgia to the United States, Canada and Mexico from July 1994 to March 2002. From 13 March 2002 to 30 November 2003, he chaired the National Security Council of Georgia.

After the bloodless Rose Revolution, which brought Eduard Shevardnadze's presidency to an end, Japaridze served as a foreign minister in the new government from 30 November 2003, to 18 March 2004. After leaving the government service, he was secretary-general of the Organization of the Black Sea Economic Cooperation (BSEC) from November 2004 to April 2005 and president of the U.S.-Caucasus Institute in Tbilisi. In 2006, he worked as a public policy scholar for Woodrow Wilson International Center for Scholars.

In 2011, Japaridze was dismissed from the Georgian diplomatic service. After this he joined the ranks of the opposition Georgian Dream party, founded by the tycoon Bidzina Ivanishvili. He was elected to the Parliament of Georgia on the Georgian Dream ticket in the October 1, 2012 election and became the chairman of the parliamentary Committee for Foreign Affairs on 21 October 2012.

Political offices
Preceded by Irakli Menagharishvili	Minister of Foreign Affairs of Georgia; November 2003 – March 2004	Succeeded by Salome Zourabichvili
