= Postage stamps of Batum under British occupation =

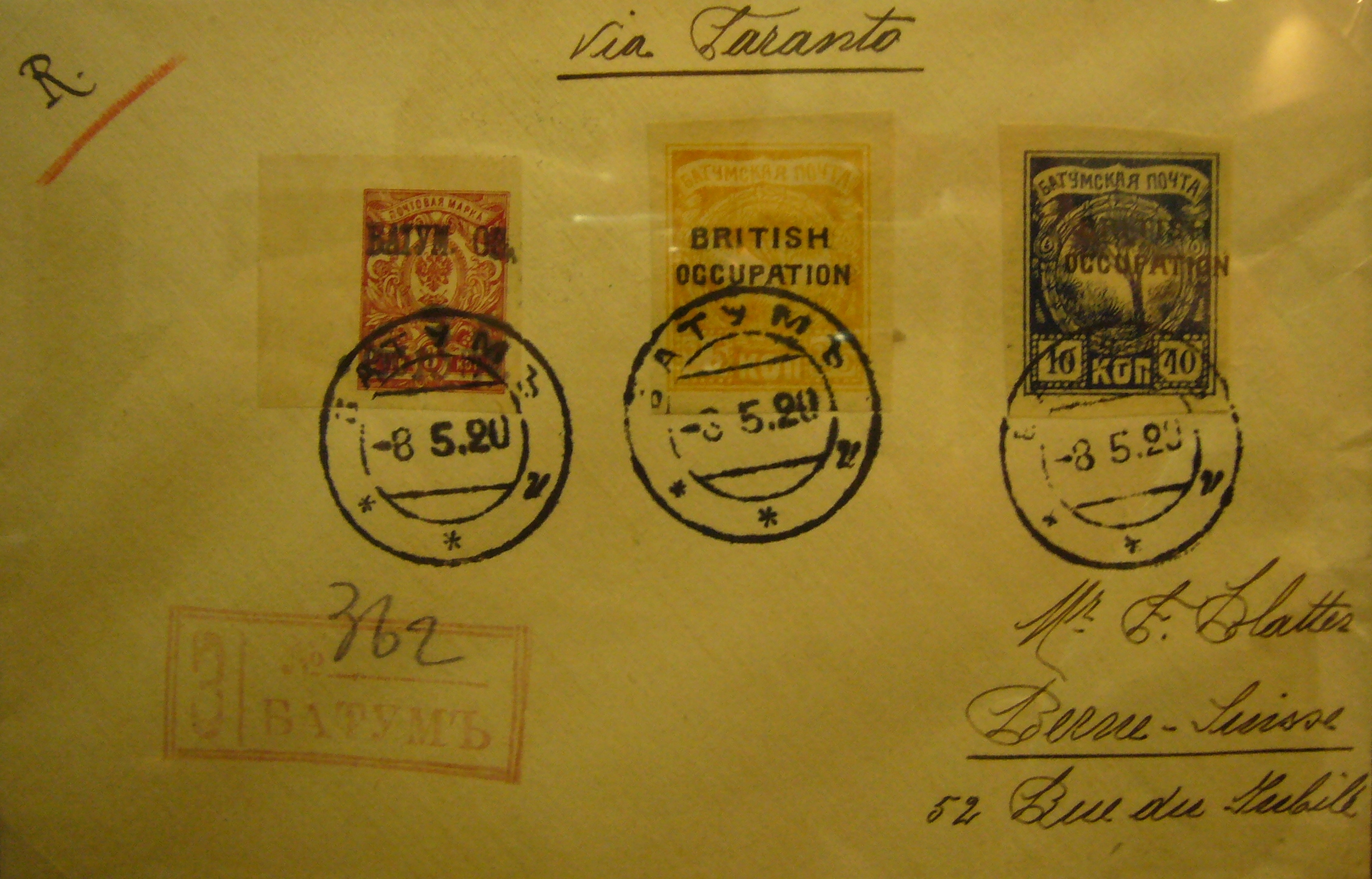
A cover with British Batumi occupation stamps cancelled 8 May 1920

Batumi (formerly Batum) is a city on the Black Sea coast and capital of Adjara, an autonomous republic in southwest Georgia. The city was under Russian rule at the beginning of World War I, but local unrest led to Turkey entering the city in April 1918, followed by the British in December, who stayed until July 1920.

== History ==
During the British occupation, the stock of postage stamps started to run out, and so in February 1919 the administration produced its own stamps. These were imperforate, depicted an aloe tree and were inscribed БАТУМСКАЯ ПОЧТА (BATUMSKAYA POCHTA), or "Batum Post."

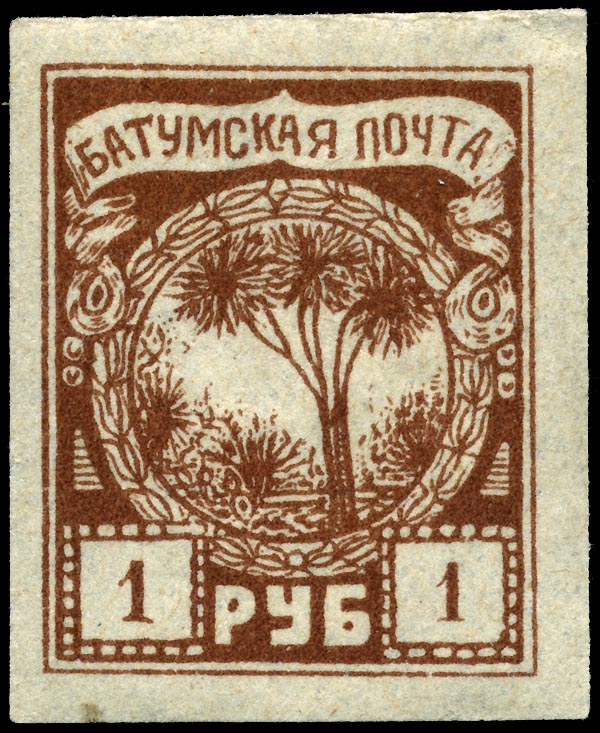
Aloe tree stamp, 1919 (forgery)

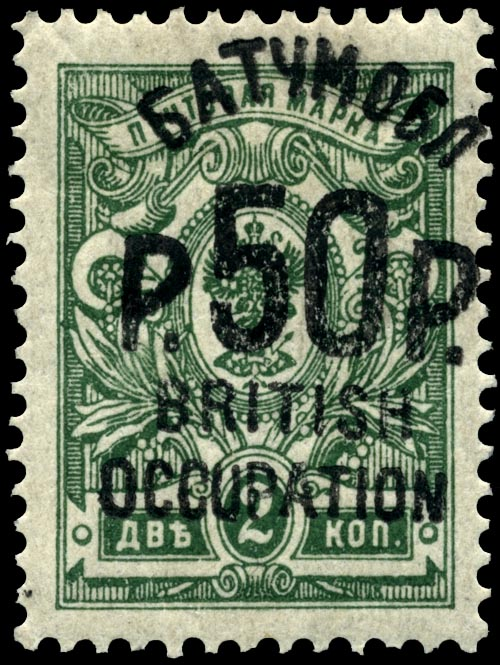
50 rubles on 2 kopeck stamp of imperial Russia, 1919 (forged overprint)

The British later overprinted these with "BRITISH OCCUPATION", and surcharged the remaining Russian stamps in a variety of styles. Inflation also took hold, and by 1920, the tree stamps, which had been as little as 5 kopecks, had to be reprinted in denominations up to 50 rubles.

Despite the short period of British rule, the tree stamps exist in large numbers, but the overprinted Russian stamps are not common, and in 2003 some commanded prices of over US$500.

Numerous philatelic forgeries exist of both the basic stamps and the overprints.

== See also ==
- Revenue stamps of Batum

== Sources ==
- Stanley Gibbons Ltd: various catalogues
- Rossiter, Stuart & John Flower. The Stamp Atlas. London: Macdonald, 1986. ISBN 0-356-10862-7
- Barefoot, John & Andrew Hall, Georgia. European Philately 11. York (Barefoot) 1983. Batum British Occupation pp. 44–51. - ISBN 090684519X.
