= Minister of Foreign Affairs of Georgia =

Head of the Ministry of Foreign Affairs of Georgia

- საქართველოს საგარეო საქმეთა მინისტრი
- Seal of the Ministry of Foreign Affairs of Georgia

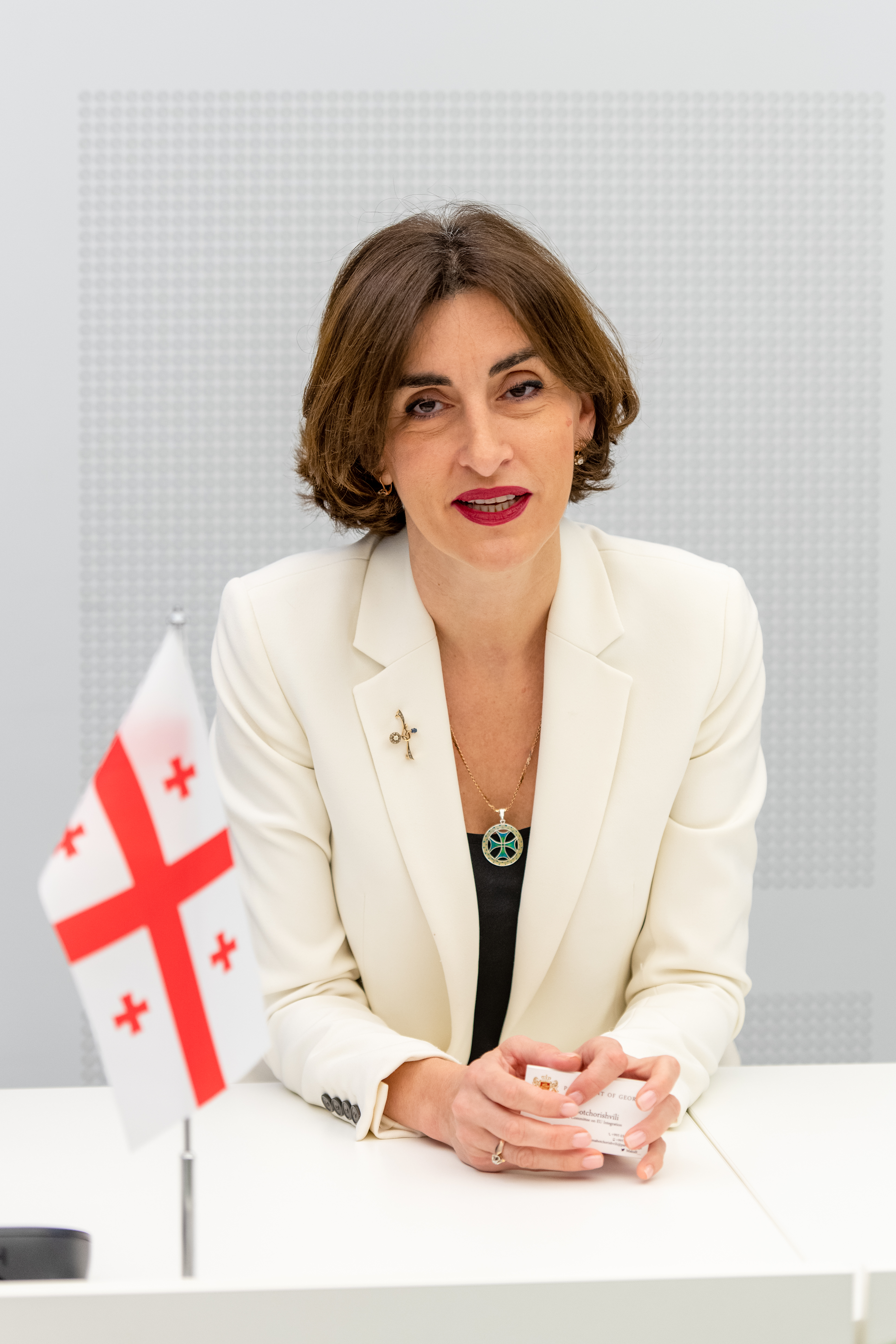
- Incumbent; Maka Botchorishvili since November 28, 2024 (Disputed)
- Ministry of Foreign Affairs of Georgia
- Style: Mr. Minister (informal); The Honorable (formal); His Excellency (diplomatic)
- Member of: Cabinet; National Security Council
- Reports to: Prime Minister
- Seat: Tbilisi, Georgia
- Appointer: Prime Minister of Georgia
- Inaugural holder: Akaki Chkhenkeli (As Minister of Foreign Affairs of Democratic Republic of Georgia); Giorgi Khoshtaria (As Minister of Foreign Affairs of Republic of Georgia)
- Formation: May 25, 1918; 108 years ago
- Salary: 11,050 GEL per month
- Website: mfa.gov.ge

The Minister of Foreign Affairs of Georgia (Georgian: საქართველოს საგარეო საქმეთა მინისტრი) is the head of the Ministry of Foreign Affairs of Georgia, the governmental body of Georgia responsible for protecting and promoting Georgia's interest and its persons and entities abroad. The minister is a member of the Cabinet of Georgia.

The current minister is Maka Botchorishvili, who was appointed on November 28, 2024 by Prime Minister Irakli Kobakhidze.

== List of ministers of foreign affairs ==
=== Democratic Republic of Georgia ===
No.	Portrait	Name	Took office	Left office
1		Akaki Chkhenkeli	26 May 1918	November 1918
2		Evgeni Gegechkori	1918	1921

=== Georgian SSR ===
People's Commissar of Foreign Affairs

No.	Portrait	Name	Took office	Left office
1		Alexander Svanidze (1886–1941)	1921	1923
From 1923 to 1944 Commissariat is liquidated
2		Giorgi Kiknadze (1902–1963)	1944	1946

Minister of Foreign Affairs

No.	Minister		Term of office	
No.	Portrait	Name	Took office	Left office
1		Giorgi Kiknadze (1902–1963)	1946	1953
2		Archil Gigoshvili (1907–1969)	1953	1954
3		Mitrofan Kuchava (1906–1999)	16 January 1954	1962
4		Archil Gigoshvili (1907–1969)	1962	1969
5		Giorgi Chogovadze (1906–1996)	1969	1970
6		Revaz Pruidze (1923–1970)	April 1970	23 July 1970
7		Shalva Kiknadze (1913–2006)	1970	1976
8		Teymuraz Gordeladze	1979	1981
9		Giorgi Javakhishvili (b. 1941)	1 January 1985	1 January 1990

=== Georgia ===
N°	Minister		Party	Term of office		
N°	Portrait	Name	Party	Took office	Left office	Term
1		Giorgi Khoshtaria (b. 1938)	–	26 November 1990	15 September 1991	293 days
2		Murman Omanidze (1938–2020)	Independent	15 September 1991	31 December 1991	107 days
3		Alexander Chikvaidze (1932–2012)	–	2 March 1992	21 December 1995	3 years, 294 days
4		Irakli Menagharishvili (b. 1951)	–	15 December 1995	29 November 2003	7 years, 349 days
5		Tedo Japaridze (b. 1946)	–	30 November 2003	20 March 2004	111 days
6		Salome Zourabichvili (b. 1952)	–	20 March 2004	19 October 2005	1 year, 213 days
7		Gela Bezhuashvili (b. 1967)	United National Movement	19 October 2005	31 January 2008	2 years, 104 days
8		David Bakradze (b. 1972)	United National Movement	31 January 2008	5 May 2008	95 days
9		Eka Tkeshelashvili (b. 1977)	United National Movement	5 May 2008	6 December 2008	215 days
10		Grigol Vashadze (b. 1958)	United National Movement	6 December 2008	25 October 2012	3 years, 324 days
11		Maia Panjikidze (b. 1960)	Free Democrats	25 October 2012	5 November 2014	2 years, 11 days
12		Tamar Beruchashvili (b. 1961)	–	11 November 2014	1 September 2015	294 days
13		Giorgi Kvirikashvili (b. 1967)	Georgian Dream	1 September 2015	30 December 2015	120 days
14		Mikheil Janelidze (b. 1981)	Independent	30 December 2015	13 June 2018	2 years, 165 days
15		David Zalkaliani (b. 1968)	Georgian Dream	21 June 2018	4 April 2022	3 years, 287 days
16		Ilia Darchiashvili (b. 1981)	Georgian Dream	4 April 2022	28 November 2024	4 years, 156 days
17		Maka Bochorishvili (b. 1978)	Georgian Dream	28 November 2024	Present	1 year, 286 days
