= Ilia Darchiashvili =

Georgian diplomat; Minister of Foreign Affairs of Georgia

- ილია დარჩიაშვილი
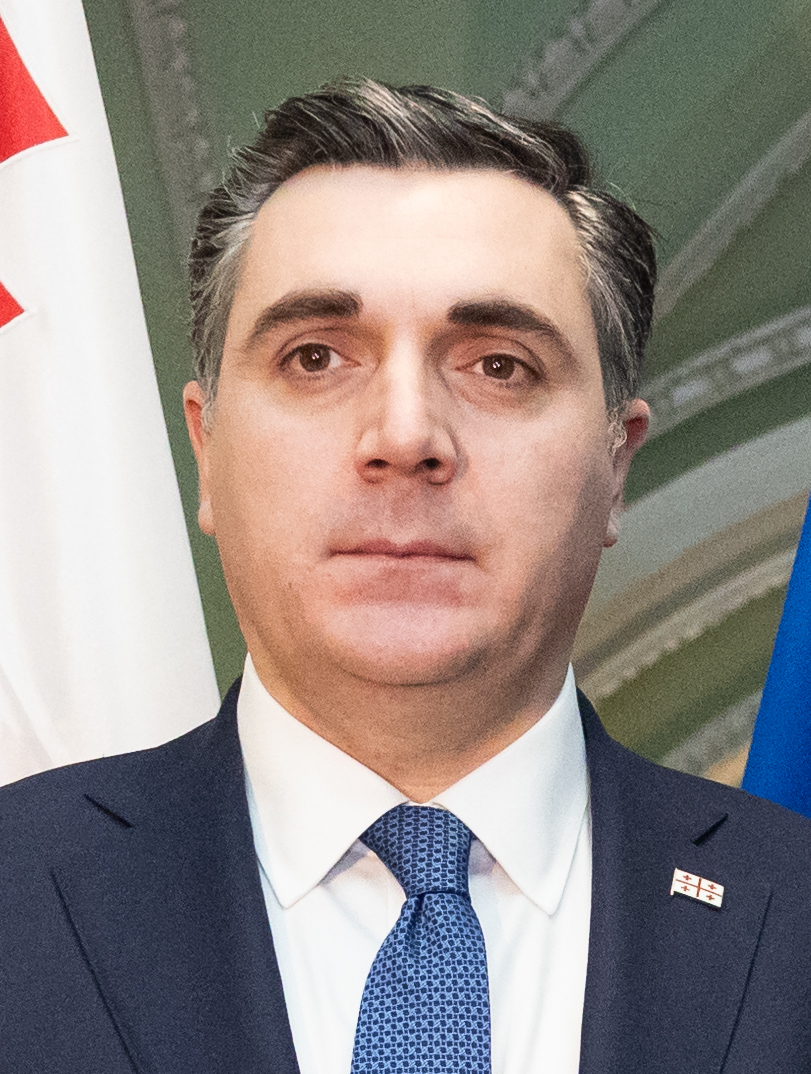
- Darchiashvili in 2024

Ambassador of Georgia to the United Kingdom
- Incumbent
- Assumed office 31 March 2026
- President: Mikheil Kavelashvili
- Prime Minister: Irakli Kobakhidze
- Preceded by: Sophie Katsarava

16th Minister of Foreign Affairs
- In office 4 April 2022 – 28 November 2024
- Prime Minister: Irakli Garibashvili; Irakli Kobakhidze
- Preceded by: David Zalkaliani
- Succeeded by: Maka Botchorishvili

Head of the Administration of the Government
- In office 22 February 2021 – 4 April 2022
- Prime Minister: Irakli Garibashvili
- Preceded by: Kakha Kemoklidze
- Succeeded by: Revaz Javelidze

Personal details
- Born: 21 February 1981 (age 45) Sighnaghi, Georgian SSR, Soviet Union
- Citizenship: Georgia
- Party: Georgian Dream

Ilia Darchiashvili (Georgian: ილია დარჩიაშვილი; born 21 February 1981) is a Georgian government official, diplomat, and a former bank manager, who served as the Minister of Foreign Affairs of Georgia from 4 April 2022 to November 28, 2024. From March 31, 2026, he has served as Georgian ambassador to the UK.

== Education and early career ==
Born in Sighnaghi in then-Soviet Georgia, Darchiashvili graduated from the Tbilisi State University (TSU) with a degree in economics in 2002. He further obtained master's degrees in economics and business administration from the TSU in 2004 and Grenoble School of Management, France, in 2011, respectively. Darchiashvili worked as a manager for the Bank Republic/Société Générale in Tbilisi from 2003 to 2012, when he joined the Ministry of Foreign Affairs of Georgia as a staff member of the Embassy of Georgia to Poland.

In 2014, Darchiashvili became Deputy Director of the state-run Municipal Development Fund during the first tenure of Prime Minister Irakli Garibashvili and, next year, he was promoted as its director. In the same year, he was moved to the position of First Deputy Minister of Regional Development and Infrastructure. He then was Ambassador-at-large at the Foreign Ministry from 2016 to 2017. He served as Georgia's Ambassador to Poland from 2017 to 2021. Shortly after Irakli Garibashvili's return as Prime Minister, Darchiashvili became Head of the Administration of the Government of Georgia in March 2021.

== Foreign minister ==
On 4 April 2022, Prime Minister Garibashvili appointed him Minister of Foreign Affairs of Georgia after the predecessor, David Zalkaliani stepped down to become Georgia's ambassador to the United States. Ukrainian Foreign Minister Dmytro Kuleba said he was "looking forward" to working together with the newly appointed Georgian counterpart. During his ministry, Georgia gained EU candidate status. In his ministerial capacity, Darchiashvili's first visit was to Brussels for the Meeting of NATO Ministers of Foreign Affairs on 6 April 2022.

== Ranks and awards ==
Ilia Darchiashvili holds the diplomatic rank of Ambassador Extraordinary and Plenipotentiary.

Political offices
| Preceded by David Zalkaliani | Minister of Foreign Affairs; 2022–2024 | Succeeded by Maka Botchorishvili |
