= Embassy of Georgia, London =

Embassy of Georgia in London
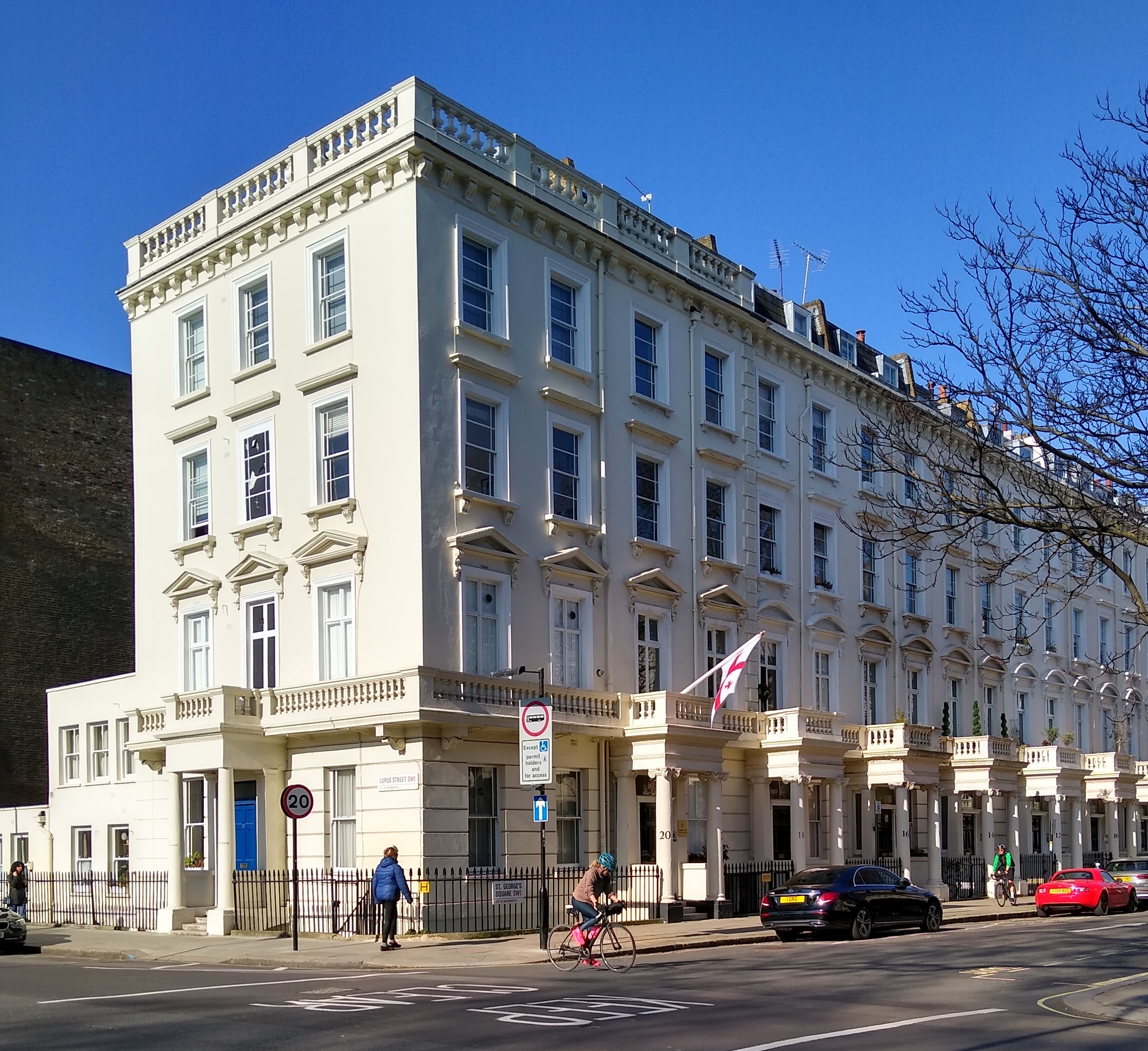
- Location: London
- Address: 20 St. George's Square, London, SW1V 2HP
- Coordinates: 51.4887525°N 0.1360084°W
- Ambassador: Tamar Beruchashvili

The Embassy of Georgia in London is the diplomatic mission of Georgia in the United Kingdom. Diplomatic relations between the two countries were originally established in 1919, effectively terminated after 1921, but restored in 1992 following dissolution of the Soviet Union.

== Gallery ==
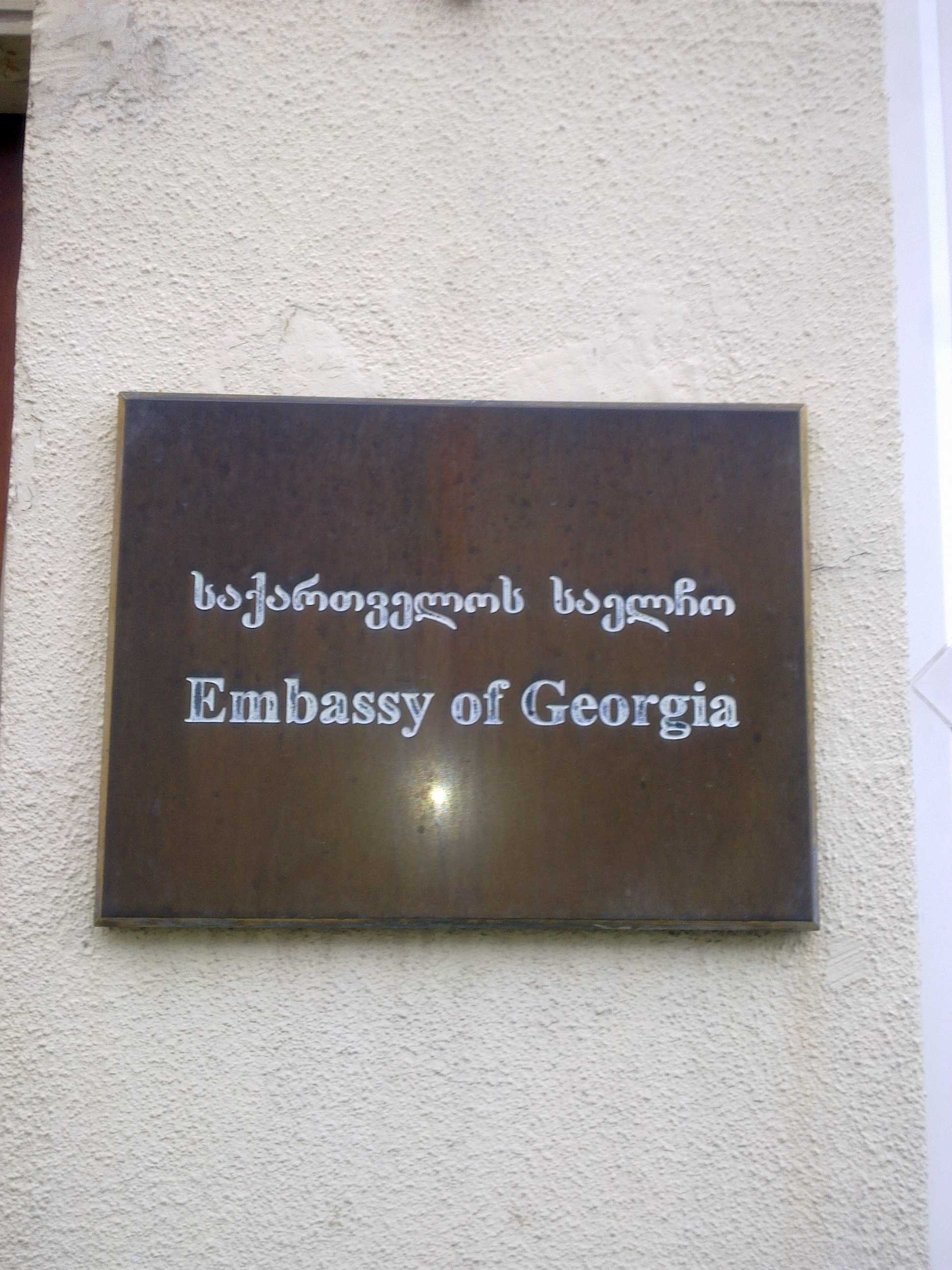
Plaque outside the embassy in English and Georgian

== See also ==
- Georgia–United Kingdom relations
