= Maka Bochorishvili =

Georgian diplomat and politician

- მაკა ბოჭორიშვილი
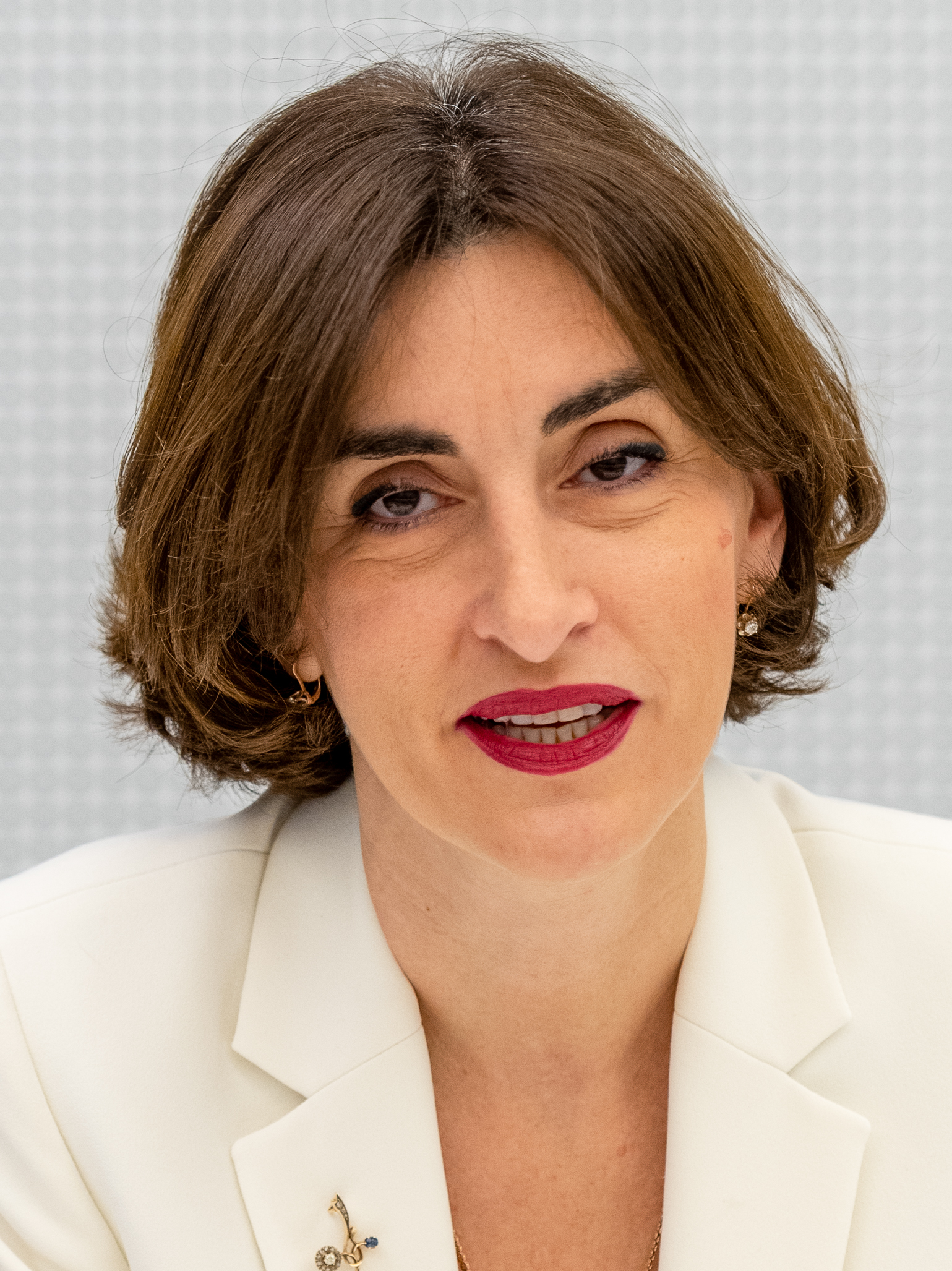
- Bochorishvili in 2023

Deputy Prime Minister of Georgia
- Incumbent
- Assumed office 21 April 2026 Serving with Irakli Chikovani and Mamuka Mdinaradze
- Prime Minister: Irakli Kobakhidze

17th Minister of Foreign Affairs
- Incumbent
- Assumed office 28 November 2024
- Prime Minister: Irakli Kobakhidze
- Preceded by: Ilia Darchiashvili

Member of the Parliament of Georgia
- Incumbent
- Assumed office 11 December 2020

Personal details
- Born: 15 August 1978 (age 48) Tbilisi, Georgian SSR, Soviet Union
- Party: Georgian Dream
- Education: Tbilisi State University

Maka Bochorishvili (Georgian: მაკა ბოჭორიშვილი; born 15 August 1978) is a Georgian diplomat and politician who has served as the Minister of Foreign Affairs since 2024. A member of the Georgian Dream she was a member of Parliament of Georgia from 2020–2024.

== Early life and career ==
Bochorishvili was born on 15 August 1978 in Tbilisi, Georgian SSR, Soviet Union. She entered the Georgian diplomatic service in 1999, initially serving as an intern, attaché, and later as Second Secretary within the Legal Department of the Representation of Georgia to the European Union until 2004. Between 2002 and 2005, she also lectured at the Diplomatic Academy of Georgia.

In 2005, she was appointed First Secretary of the International Legal Department at the Ministry of Foreign Affairs, concurrently serving as Second Secretary at the Embassy of Georgia to Belgium and the Representation to the EU until 2009. She was subsequently promoted to Head of the EU–Georgia Relations Division within the EU Integration Department, holding the post from 2009 to 2010. She returned to Brussels as a diplomatic advisor from 2010 to 2014, before being recalled to Tbilisi to serve as Deputy Director of the EU Integration Department from 2014 to 2015.

From 2015 to 2017, Bochorishvili served as Ambassador to the International Organizations in Vienna, attached to the Georgian Embassy in Austria and the Representation to the OSCE. In 2017, she returned to Brussels to serve as Chargé d’Affaires to Belgium and the EU, before being elevated to Ambassador from 2018 to 2020.

== Political career ==
=== Parlisament ===
She became a member of the Parliament of Georgia on 11 December 2020 following the parliamentary election. She served on the Foreign Relations Committee and as Chairman of the European Integration Committee. Bochorishvili was nominated as number nine on the Georgian Dream parliamentary list for the 2024 elections.

=== In Government ===
She succeeded Ilia Darchiashvili as Minister of Foreign Affairs on 28 November 2024, being appointed by Prime Minister Irakli Kobakhidze. She was appointed Deputy Prime Minister of Georgia on 21 April 2026, serving with Irakli Chikovani and Mamuka Mdinaradze.

== Personal life ==
In addition to his native Georgian, she also speaks English, Russian, French and Italian. She has a daughter.

== Honours ==
- Order of Honor (2013)
