= Revaz Gachechiladze =

Georgian Geographer

- რევაზ გაჩეჩილაძე
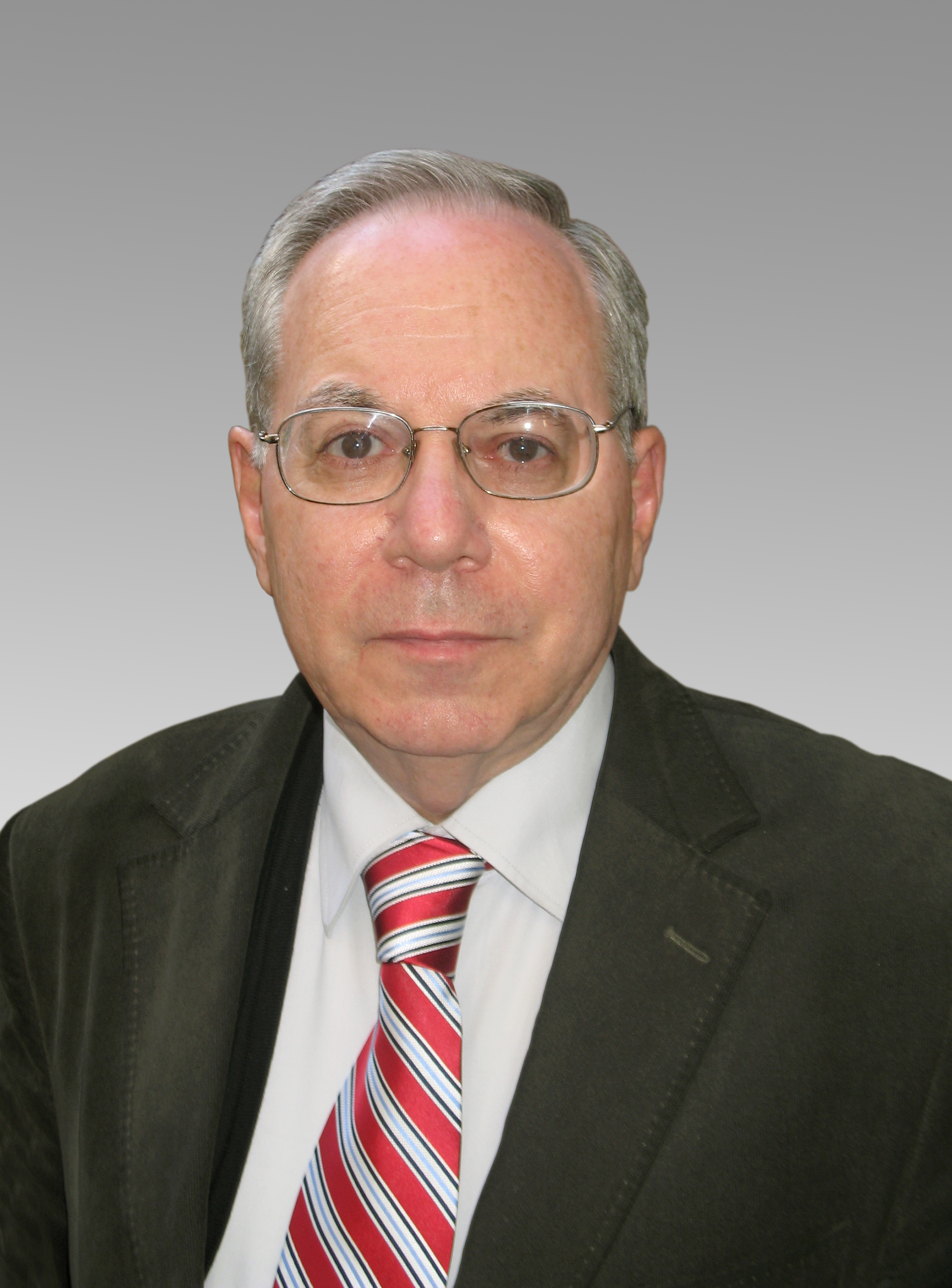
- Gachechiladze in 2011
- Born: May 4, 1942 (age 83)

Revaz Gachechiladze (რევაზ გაჩეჩილაძე born on May 4, 1942) is a Georgian academician and professor of geography at Ivane Javakhishvili Tbilisi State University, recognized for his extensive contributions to the fields of socio-economic and political geography, as well as the geography and geopolitics of the Middle East and the Caucasus.

Throughout his career, Gachechiladze has held several positions, including the head of the Master Program "Demography and Population Geography" at Tbilisi State University, where he has also been a guiding force for numerous students and researchers. His research interests include human (political, social) geography, and the history of the Middle East and Caucasus. Gachechiladze's work is not only recognized within academic circles but has also earned him membership in various professional bodies and associations.

== Academic career ==
Gachechiladze's academic career is marked by a study and teaching of geography and political sciences, with a particular focus on the socio-economic and geopolitical dynamics of the Middle East and the Caucasus. His role at the Ivane Javakhishvili Tbilisi State University has been instrumental in shaping the academic direction of the geography department.

One of Gachechiladze's notable contributions to the field is his analysis of the emergence of the Newly Independent States at the end of 1991, a pivotal moment that marked the dissolution of the Soviet Union and the reconfiguration of geopolitical boundaries in the region. His work delves into the political crises that precipitated these changes, offering insights into the interplay of historical and contemporary factors that have shaped the post-Soviet space. In addition to his research and teaching, Gachechiladze has played a pivotal role in the academic administration, serving as the managing director at Ivane Javakhishvili Tbilisi State University.

=== Research Interests ===
One of Gachechiladze's key research themes is the development of the New Georgia, where he examines the factors contributing to the country's evolution in the post-Soviet era. His analysis of the pluses and minuses of development factors provides an understanding of the socio-economic transformations that have taken place in Georgia, offering a comprehensive overview of the country's journey towards modernization and integration into the global community.

Gachechiladze's interest in geopolitics extends to the study of foreign powers in the modern history of Georgia, comparing critical periods such as 1918-21 and 1991–2010. Through this comparative approach, he sheds light on the influence of external actors on Georgia's political landscape, highlighting the ongoing struggle for sovereignty and territorial integrity in the face of geopolitical challenges.

Another significant area of Gachechiladze's research revolves around the history of Georgian medieval and modern historiography, ethnic processes during Tsarist and Soviet periods, and the role of historical discourse and memory politics in regional conflicts in Georgia. His work in this domain explores the ways in which historical narratives and collective memories shape contemporary geopolitical and social dynamics, offering insights into the interplay between history, identity, and politics in the Caucasus.
