= Ministry of Foreign Affairs of Georgia =

Government ministry of Georgia

- Georgian: საქართველოს საგარეო საქმეთა სამინისტრო
- Logo of the Georgian MFA

- Ministry of Foreign Affairs of Georgia

Ministry overview
- Formed: May 25, 1918; 108 years ago
- Jurisdiction: Government of Georgia
- Headquarters: Ceremonial Palace of Georgia, 1, Abdushelishvili Str., 0118, Tbilisi, Georgia
- Annual budget: ₾186 million (USD 70.06 million) (2023)
- Ministry executive: Maka Bochorishvili, Minister of Foreign Affairs
- Website: www.mfa.gov.ge

The Ministry of Foreign Affairs of Georgia (Georgian: საქართველოს საგარეო საქმეთა სამინისტრო, romanized: sakartvelos sagareo sakmeta saminist'ro) is a governmental body of Georgia responsible for protecting and promoting Georgia's interest and its persons and entities abroad. The Ministry is led by the Minister of Foreign Affairs who is appointed by the Prime Minister of Georgia as a member of cabinet. The position is currently held by Maka Bochorishvili, in office since 25 November 2024.

== Activity ==
Georgia's foreign service – the Ministry of Foreign Affairs, Diplomatic Missions and Consular Services - serve fundamental national interests and values anchored in the Constitution of Georgia, the Foreign Policy Strategy as well as the National Security Concept. The Ministry drives Georgia's foreign policy to enhance the security and international status of the country, and promote its interests in an increasingly globalizing world.

== History ==
=== Democratic Republic of Georgia ===
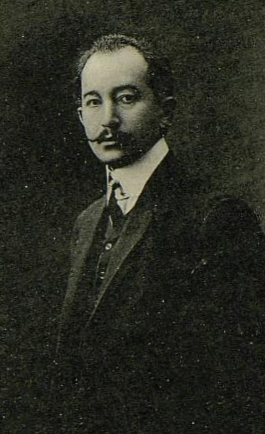
Evgeni Gegechkori

The Ministry of Foreign Affairs was established on 26 May 1918, the same day Georgia declared its independence. Consequently, the foreign affairs commission, diplomatic missions, and other entities necessary for carrying out diplomatic work were formed abroad. The first Foreign Minister was Akaki Chkhenkeli, a political leader. In November 1918, Evgeni Gegechkori was appointed as the Minister of Foreign Affairs.

The Ministry of Foreign Affairs was the main foreign policy agency of the Democratic Republic of Georgia. It held diplomatic negotiations on behalf of the government. The Ministry was accountable to the Parliament. The staff of the Ministry did not exceed 50 people and its structure was the following:

- The Minister of Foreign Affairs - Director of the Ministry, Deputy Director, Legal Counsel, Secretary of the Minister.
- Personnel Department - the Head of the Personnel Department of the Minister, executive secretary, driver.
- Political Department - the Head of the Department, the Head of the European Division, the Head of the Asian Division, executive secretaries of the divisions, chancelleries and translators.
- General Department - the Head of the Department, executive secretary and his assistant, chancellery.
- Information Bureau - the Head of the Department, executive secretary, chancellery and translators.

== Structure and Organization ==
=== Minister of Foreign Affairs ===
The Minister of Foreign Affairs is the chief executive officer of the Ministry and a member of the Cabinet who answers directly to, and advises, the Prime Minister of Georgia. The minister organizes and supervises the entire ministry and its staff.

=== Structure ===
Structure
Minister of Foreign Affairs	Minister's Secretariat
Minister of Foreign Affairs	Internal Audit Department: Division of Internal Audit; Division of Internal Inspection
Minister of Foreign Affairs	Division of Classified Document Management
Minister of Foreign Affairs	Ambassadors at Large
Minister of Foreign Affairs	General Directorate of Information and Public Relations: Press and Information Department; Strategic Communications Department
Minister of Foreign Affairs	Department of Human Resources Management
Minister of Foreign Affairs	Political Department: Analytical Division
Minister of Foreign Affairs	Department of Security of Georgian Diplomatic Representations and Consular Offices Abroad: Division of Europe; Division of Neighbouring Countries; Division of Americas, Asia, Africa, Australia and Oceania
First Deputy Minister of Foreign Affairs	Political Department: Policy Planning Division
First Deputy Minister of Foreign Affairs	Department of International Organisations: UN Division; OSCE Division; Division Council of Europe; New Threats and Arms Control Division
First Deputy Minister of Foreign Affairs	Department of Neighbouring Countries: Division of Bilateral Relations; Service of Georgian State border Delimitation, Demarcation and Border Relations
First Deputy Minister of Foreign Affairs	Department of the Americas: Division of U.S. And Canada; Division of Latin American and Caribbean Basin Countries
First Deputy Minister of Foreign Affairs	Department of NATO Integration: NATO Division; Division of inter-agency coordination
Deputy Minister of Foreign Affairs	Department of European Affairs: Division of West Europe; Division of East Europe
Deputy Minister of Foreign Affairs	General Directorate of European Integration: Department of European Integration; Division for EU Association; Division for Eastern Partnership, Policy Planning and Analysis; EU Assistance Coordination and Sectoral Integration Department; Division for EU Assistance Coordination; Division for Sectoral Integration
Deputy Minister of Foreign Affairs	LEPL - Information Center on NATO and EU: Public Information Division on EU; Public Information Division on NATO; Project Management Division; Regional Representatives Coordination Division
Deputy Minister of Foreign Affairs	Department of International Cultural and Humanitarian Relations
Deputy Minister of Foreign Affairs	Department of Diplomatic Protocol: Diplomatic Missions and International Organisations Division; High Level Delegations Division; Events and Ceremonials Division
Deputy Minister of Foreign Affairs	Department of International Law: Division of Bilateral International Treaties; Division of Multilateral International Treaties and Legal Analysis
Deputy Minister of Foreign Affairs	Department of Legal Issues and Relations with Parliament
Deputy Minister of Foreign Affairs	Consular Department: Analytical and Planning Division; Division of Georgia's Diplomatic Representations and Consular Offices Abroad; Division of Foreign Diplomatic Representations and Consular Offices in Georgia; Information and Consultation Division
Deputy Minister of Foreign Affairs	LEPL - Bureau of Translation of International Agreements
Deputy Minister of Foreign Affairs	Department of International Economic Relations: Division of Multinational and Regional Economic Cooperation; Division for the Promotion of Foreign Investments and Export
Deputy Minister of Foreign Affairs	Department of Middle East and Africa
Deputy Minister of Foreign Affairs	Department of Asia and The Pacific: Division of Central and East Asian Countries; Division of South Asia, Australian and Pacific Rim Countries
Deputy Minister of Foreign Affairs	Administrative Department: Budget Planning and Management Service; Bookkeeping and Reporting Service; State Procurement Service; Material-Technical Support Service; Official Correspondence Service: General Recordkeeping Division; Diplomatic Mail Division; Archive Division
Deputy Minister of Foreign Affairs	Department for Relations With Diaspora: Division for Relations with Compatriots and Diaspora Organisations; Diaspora Programmes Division
Deputy Minister of Foreign Affairs	IT Department
Deputy Minister of Foreign Affairs	LEPL - Levan Mikeladze Diplomatic Training and Research Institute

Legal Entities of Public Law

o LEPL - Information Center on NATO and EU

LEPL Information Center on NATO and EU was established in 2005 and, since 2017, operates under the Ministry of Foreign Affairs of Georgia. The Information Centre on NATO and EU aims to support Georgia's European and Euro-Atlantic integration process through public diplomacy and strategic communication efforts, primarily focusing on maintaining and increasing knowledge-based public support towards the country's top foreign policy priorities - Georgia's membership to the North Atlantic Treaty Organization and to the European Union.

o LEPL - Levan Mikeladze Diplomatic Training and Research Institute

The goal of The Levan Mikeladze Diplomatic Training and Research Institute (DTRI) of the Ministry of Foreign Affairs of Georgia (MFA) is to promote the continuous professional development of MFA staff and those forming the diplomatic reserve, taking into consideration Georgian foreign policy priorities, existing needs and trends. The Centre also aims to raise the awareness of foreign diplomats accredited to Georgia and strengthen the capacity of public officials working in the area of international relations.

== Budget ==
The budget of the Ministry of Foreign Affairs in 2023 is GEL 186 million (USD 70.06 million), up by GEL 9.4 million (USD 3.5 million) compared to 2022.

== See also ==
- Foreign relations of Georgia
- Minister of Foreign Affairs of Georgia
