= Beletski =

Beletski or Beletsky (feminine, in Russian: Beletskaya) is a Russian-language surname. Its Polish counterpart is Bielecki, Ukrainian: Biletskyi, Biletskyy.

The surname may refer to:

- Alexei Beletski (born 1979), Israeli ice dancer
- Irina Beletskaya (born 1933), Russian chemist
- Stepan Petrovich Beletsky, statesman and head of the Police Department in the Russian Empire
- Viktor Beletsky, Soviet diplomat
- Monica Beletsky, American television producer and screenwriter
