= Tugarinov =

Tugarinov is a Russian surname. Notable persons with the surname include:

- Arkady Yakovlevich Tugarinov (1880–1948), Russian-Soviet ornithologist
- Ivan Ivanovich Tugarinov (1905–1966), Soviet diplomat
- Roman Ruslanovich Tugarinov (born 1999), Russian soccer player
