= Apsītis =

Apsītis, feminine: Apsīte is a Latvian surname.

- Aleksandrs Apsītis (1880–1944), Latvian illustrator
- Andrejs Apsītis (7 February 1888 – 2 September 1945) was a Latvian cyclist
- Kristiāna Apsīte, Latvian ice hockey player
- Romāns Apsītis (13 February 1939 – February 2022) was a Latvian jurist and politician
