= Tolstikov =

Tolstikov (Russian: Толстиков) is a Russian surname, which may refer to

- Yevgeny Tolstikov (1913–1987), Soviet polar explorer
  - 3357 Tolstikov, asteroid named after Yevgeny Tolstikov
- Vasily Tolstikov (1917–2003), Soviet diplomat and Communist Party official
- Genrich Tolstikov (1933–2013), Russian chemist
- Yakov Tolstikov (born 1959), Russian distance runner
