= Karl Ludwig von Phull =

German general (1757–1826)

Carl Ludwig August von Phull
- Born: 6 November 1757; Ludwigsburg, Duchy of Württemberg
- Died: 25 April 1826 (aged 68); Stuttgart, Kingdom of Württemberg
- Burial place: Hoppenlaufriedhof, Stuttgart
- Spouse(s): Henriette Luise Charlotte von Beguelin (m. 1790; div. 1800) Charlotte Poths (m. 1801; div. 1803) Sabine Henriette von Wedel (m. 1810, separated)
- Children: Emilie Henriette (1792–1864); Eugen (1801–1857)
- Military career
- Allegiance: Duchy of Württemberg; Kingdom of Prussia; Russian Empire
- Branch: Army of Württemberg; Prussian Army; Imperial Russian Army
- Service years: 1774–1821
- Rank: Lieutenant General
- Conflicts: War of the Bavarian Succession; French Revolutionary Wars; Napoleonic Wars; Battle of Jena-Auerstedt; Napoleon's invasion of Russia
- Awards: Order of Saint Alexander Nevsky (Grand Cross); Order of the Netherlands Lion (Grand Cross); Pour le Mérite
- Other work: Russian ambassador to the Netherlands (1814–1821)

Karl Ludwig August Friedrich von Phull (or Pfuel) (6 November 1757 – 25 April 1826) was a German general in the service of the Kingdom of Prussia and the Russian Empire. Phull served as Chief of the General Staff of King Frederick William III of Prussia in the Battle of Jena-Auerstedt. While in Russian service, he successfully advocated for a scorched earth policy during Napoleon's invasion of Russia.

== Early life ==
Phull was born in Ludwigsburg to the Württemberg-line of the Pfuel family of Brandenburg. He was the son of the Swabian general Carl Ludwig Wilhelm August von Phull (1723–1793) and Auguste Wilhelmine von Keßlau (1734–1768).

== Career ==
Phull began his military career on 13 February 1774 as a Lieutenant in the Württemberg Foot Guards. After four years, he resigned and entered Prussian service, where he was appointed on 1 April 1778 as a Second Lieutenant in the Free Regiment Count Hordt. Following the War of the Bavarian Succession, Phull was promoted in 1779 to Captain and assigned to Potsdam under Frederick II, joining his general staff in 1781. In 1793, he participated in the Rhine Campaign and was awarded the Pour le Mérite for his actions in the engagement at Karlsberg on 18 April 1793. He was promoted to Lieutenant Colonel in 1796, to Colonel in 1798, and to Major General in 1805. In 1803, he served as director of the Military Society in Berlin. From 1804, as head of a department in the general staff, he served as chief of staff to Frederick William III during the Battle of Jena–Auerstedt. Following the catastrophic defeat, he was entrusted by the king with a mission to the Russian Tsar Alexander.

Phull remained at the Tsar's court, gained the confidence of the Tsar, and on 20 December 1806, entered Russian service as a Major General à la suite, tasked with instructing the Tsar in the art of war. Naturally, after the Treaty of Tilsit in 1807, the possibility of a further Russo-French war had to be considered. On 19 September 1809, Phull was appointed Lieutenant General and Quartermaster General.

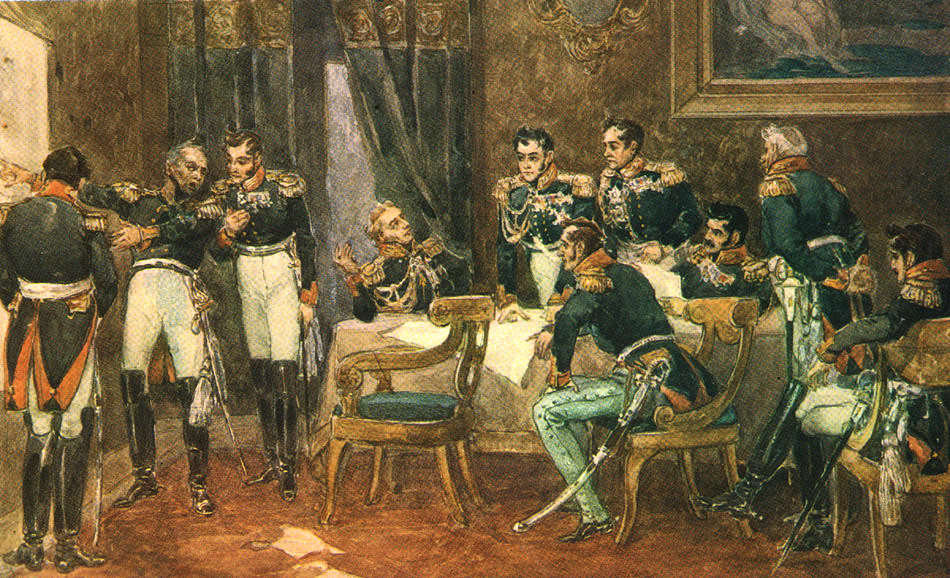
Military Council of Tsar Alexander in Drissa (held on July 1, 1812). Painting by Aleksandrs Apsītis (1912)

Before the campaign, Phull was significantly involved in developing the Russian strategy, overseeing the fortification of the Drissa camp months in advance. At the start of the invasion, he served in the immediate entourage of Tsar Alexander, but his Drissa plan was rejected at a war council.

After Napoleon took Moscow on 14 September 1812, Phull was denounced by many Russian officers. He had to flee through Sweden to Britain. Allegedly, the Tsar hid his confidant in his cabinet for eight days before his flight. But the merits of his advice were later recognized. In a letter to Phull on 12 December 1813, Tsar Alexander wrote "C'est vous qui avez conçu le plan qui, avec l'aide de la providence, a eu pour suite le salut de la Russie et celui de l'Europe." ("It is you who conceived the plan which, with the help of Providence, had as a result the salvation of Russia and that of Europe").

In 1813, Phull advised Prince Frederik of the Netherlands in The Hague. After the fall of Paris in 1814, Phull was named Russian ambassador in The Hague and Brussels. His witty third wife, Sabine Henriette von Wedel, headed a popular household in Brussels. After Sabine became emotionally unstable, Phull retired to Stuttgart in 1821, where he died five years later.

Phull was buried at the Hoppenlaufriedhof in Stuttgart. His tombstone is in the form of a tumba with a large gravestone, inscribed in Russian and German. The German text reads: "Not to ourselves, but to the universe we belong! Here lies buried Carl Ludwig August Freiherr von Phull, Imperial Russian Lieutenant General, Grand Cross of the Russian Order of Saint Alexander Nevsky, Order of Saint Vladimir First Class, Order of Saint Anna First Class, Grand Cross of the Dutch Order of the Netherlands Lion, Knight of the Prussian Pour le Mérite, born on 6 November 1757, died on 25 April 1826."

== Legacy ==
The debate over Phull's significance for the Russian defensive strategy during Napoleon's invasion of Russia in 1812 is extensively reflected in Leo Tolstoy's novel War and Peace, in which the general is known as Pfuel. It is disputed how involved Phull was in the Russian decision to adopt a scorched earth policy, as several military figures, including Bernadotte, claimed to have recommended the retreat strategy to the Tsar. This dispute is put into perspective by the fact that, since the successful guerrilla tactics of the insurgents in the Spanish War of Independence starting in 1808, this defensive strategy was well-known to every interested officer in Europe through military journals. According to Clausewitz, who was in Phull's entourage at the start of the Russian campaign, Phull only initiated the retreat as far as Drissa, where he intended to engage Napoleon in battle. His plan unintentionally contributed to the Russian retreat as far as Moscow, as generals like Barclay de Tolly had pushed for a battle already at the border. Clausewitz explicitly rejects attributing the entire retreat strategy to Phull. Instead, it was a chain of coincidences and spontaneous decisions, with Phull's retreat to Drissa likely being the most significant. In a note dedicated to the 1812 events, Phull attempted to justify his plan, attributing its failure to the ineffective actions of Russian generals.

In Stuttgart, his hometown, a street named "Phullstraße" commemorates him, reflecting his regional significance despite his controversial military career.

== Family ==
Phull's first marriage was in Potsdam on 2 May 1790 to Henriette Luise Charlotte von Beguelin (1763–1810), but they divorced in 1800. They had one daughter, Emilie Hernriette (1792–1864). Phull remarried on 18 September 1801 to Charlotte Poths (1766–1808), but this second marriage ended in 1803. Phull and Poths had one son, Eugen (1801–1857). Phull married for a third time in Berlin on 4 October 1810 to Sabine Henriette von Wedel (ca. 1773–1840), but this marriage also ended in separation.
