= Anatoly Blatov =

Soviet diplomat

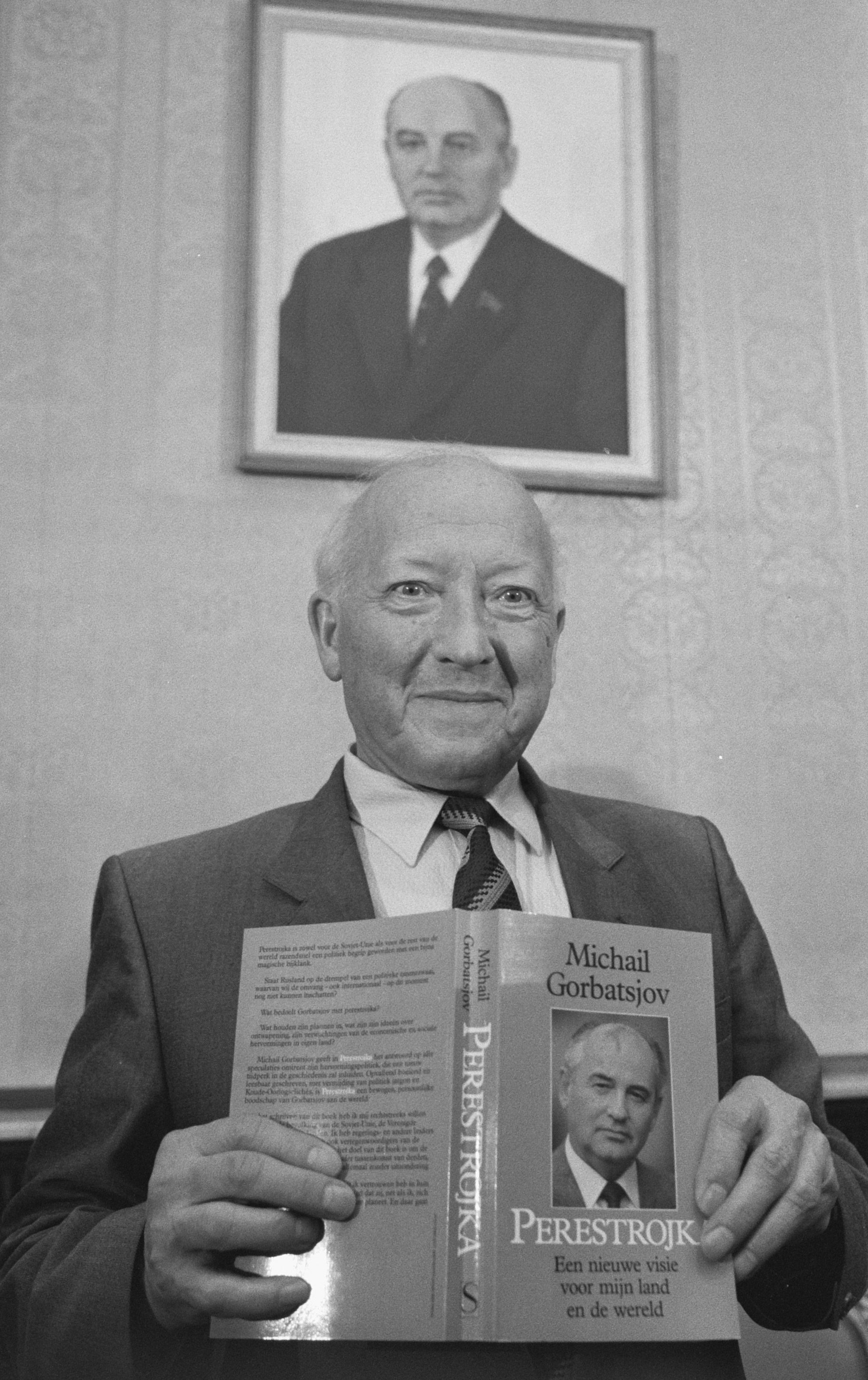
Blatov in 1987

Anatoly Ivanovich Blatov (born Ivanov, Russian: Анато́лий Ива́нович Блатов (Иванов); 11 July 1914 – 1 October 1988) was a Soviet diplomat and Communist Party official. Between 1972 and 1982 he was assistant to Leonid Brezhnev.

Blatov graduated from the Dnipropetrovsk National University of Rail Transport (1940) and Communist Party Supreme School (1945). He held the following positions:

- 1945–1947 – official of the Ministry of Foreign Affairs
- 1947–1948 – professor at the Moscow State Institute of International Relations
- 1948–1949 – official of the Soviet Information Bureau
- 1949–1954 – various positions at the Soviet Union to Germany
- 1955–1968 – official at the Ministry of Foreign Affairs
- 1968–1972 – official at the Central Committee of the Communist Party of the Soviet Union
- 1972–1982 – assistant to Leonid Brezhnev
- 1982–1985 – official at the Central Committee of the Communist Party of the Soviet Union
- 1985–1988 – Ambassador of the Soviet Union to the Netherlands
