= List of ambassadors of Russia to the Netherlands =

Ambassador of the Russian Federation to the Kingdom of the Netherlands
- Emblem of the Russian Foreign Ministry
- Incumbent; Vladimir Tarabrin since 5 December 2023
- Ministry of Foreign Affairs; Embassy of Russia in The Hague
- Style: His Excellency; The Honourable
- Reports to: Minister of Foreign Affairs
- Seat: The Hague
- Appointer: President of Russia
- Term length: At the pleasure of the president
- Website: Embassy of Russia in The Hague

The ambassador of Russia to the Netherlands is the official representative of the president and the government of the Russian Federation to the king and the government of the Netherlands.

The ambassador and his staff work at large in the Russian Embassy in The Hague. The current Russian ambassador to the Netherlands is Vladimir Tarabrin, incumbent since 5 December 2023. The ambassador is concurrently accredited as Russia's permanent representative to the Organisation for the Prohibition of Chemical Weapons.

== History of diplomatic relations ==
=== Tsardom of Russia ===
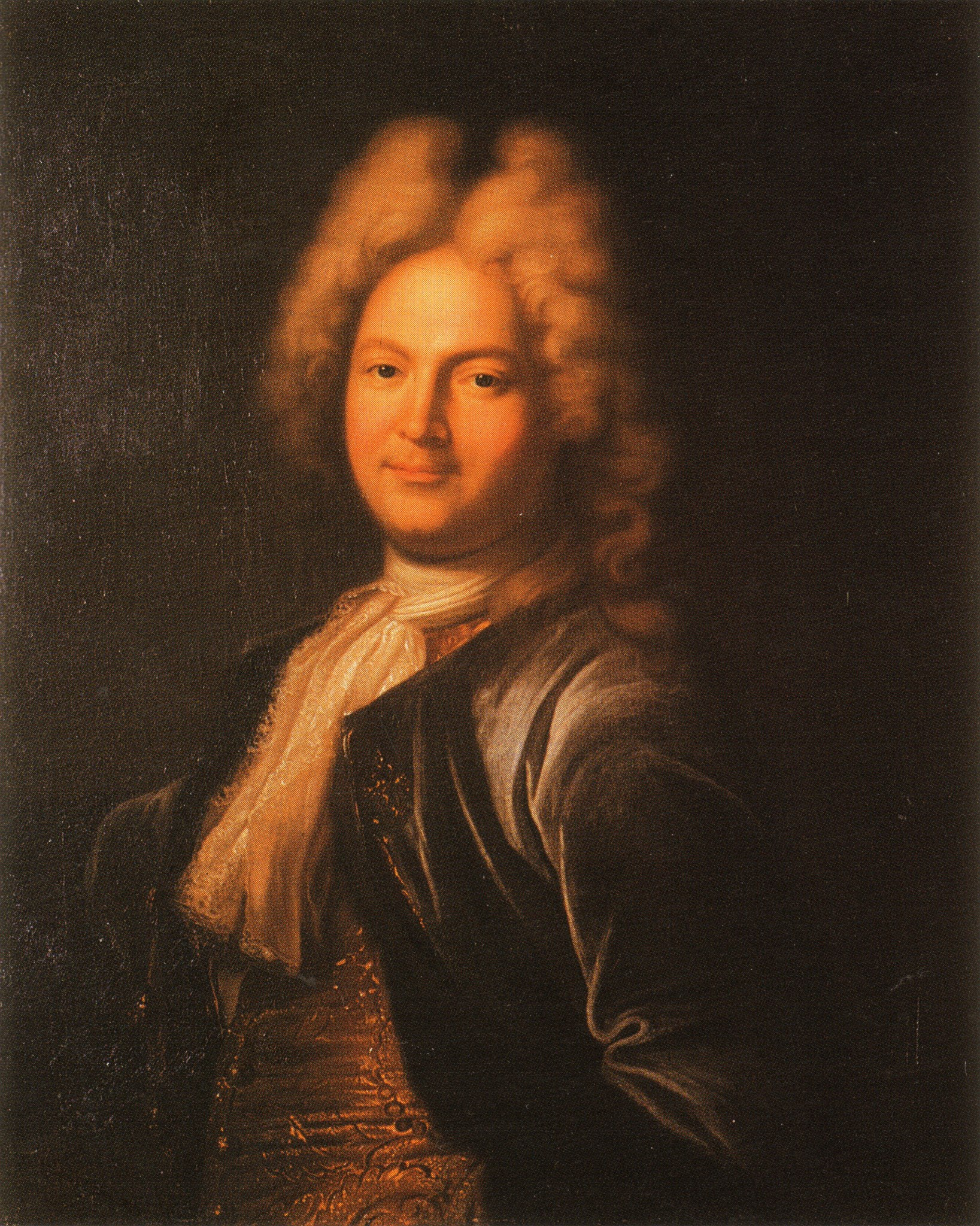
Andrey Matveyev, Russian envoy to the Dutch Republic from 1699 to 1712

Contacts between the predecessor states of the Netherlands and Russia date back to trade expeditions around 1000 AD, with regular contact established by the reign of Ivan the Terrible (1547-1584), when Dutch merchants visted Arkhangelsk. In 1613, Stepan Ushakov and Semyon Zaborovsky were sent to the Netherlands to present the news of the accession of Tsar Mikhail Fyodorovich, and to request assistance in the Polish–Russian War. In 1646, Ilya Miloslavsky and Ivan Baybakov visited as envoys of Tsar Aleksei Mikhailovich. Temporary missions were exchanged throughout the Tsarist period, and in 1696, Tsar Peter I sent his Grand Embassy to Western Europe, nominally led by Franz Lefort, Fyodor Golovin and Prokofy Voznitsyn, and accompanied by Peter himself. The embassy reached the Netherlands by mid-August 1697, leaving in January 1698. Contacts were strengthened with the appointment of the first permanent representative to the Netherlands the following year, Andrey Matveyev serving as Russian envoy in The Hague from 1699 to 1712. A consulate was opened in Amsterdam on 16 April 1707, and Matveyev was succeeded in 1712 by Boris Kurakin, a noted diplomat who was ambassador during the establishment of the Russian Empire in 1721.

=== Imperial Russia ===
Representatives continued to be exchanged between the two countries under Peter's successors, during the turbulent eighteenth century, with the first significant rupture occurring during the French Revolutionary Wars. The Dutch Republic was invaded by troops of the French First Republic in 1795, establishing the Batavian Republic, allied with France. Russia entered the War of the Second Coalition against France and its allies in late 1798, and in 1799, participated in the unsuccessful Anglo-Russian invasion of Holland. Relations were broken off during the war, but resumed after the signing of the Treaty of Amiens in 1802. Hostilities between what was now the First French Empire under Emperor Napoleon Bonaparte, and the Russian Empire, resumed in 1805 with the War of the Third Coalition. The relative independence of what from 1806 was the Kingdom of Holland meant that diplomatic relations were maintained, until the Kingdom was formally annexed to the French Empire in 1810, a period known as the Incorporation. Relations were again suspended until the defeat of France in the War of the Sixth Coalition in 1814, after which relations were restored with the newly independent but shortlived Sovereign Principality of the United Netherlands, and then its successor from 1815, the United Kingdom of the Netherlands. Envoys were thereafter exchanged between the two countries for the next hundred years, uninterrupted by the transition from the United Kingdom of the Netherlands to the Kingdom of the Netherlands, following the Belgian Revolution in 1830 and the ratification of Belgian independence in 1839.

=== Soviet Union ===
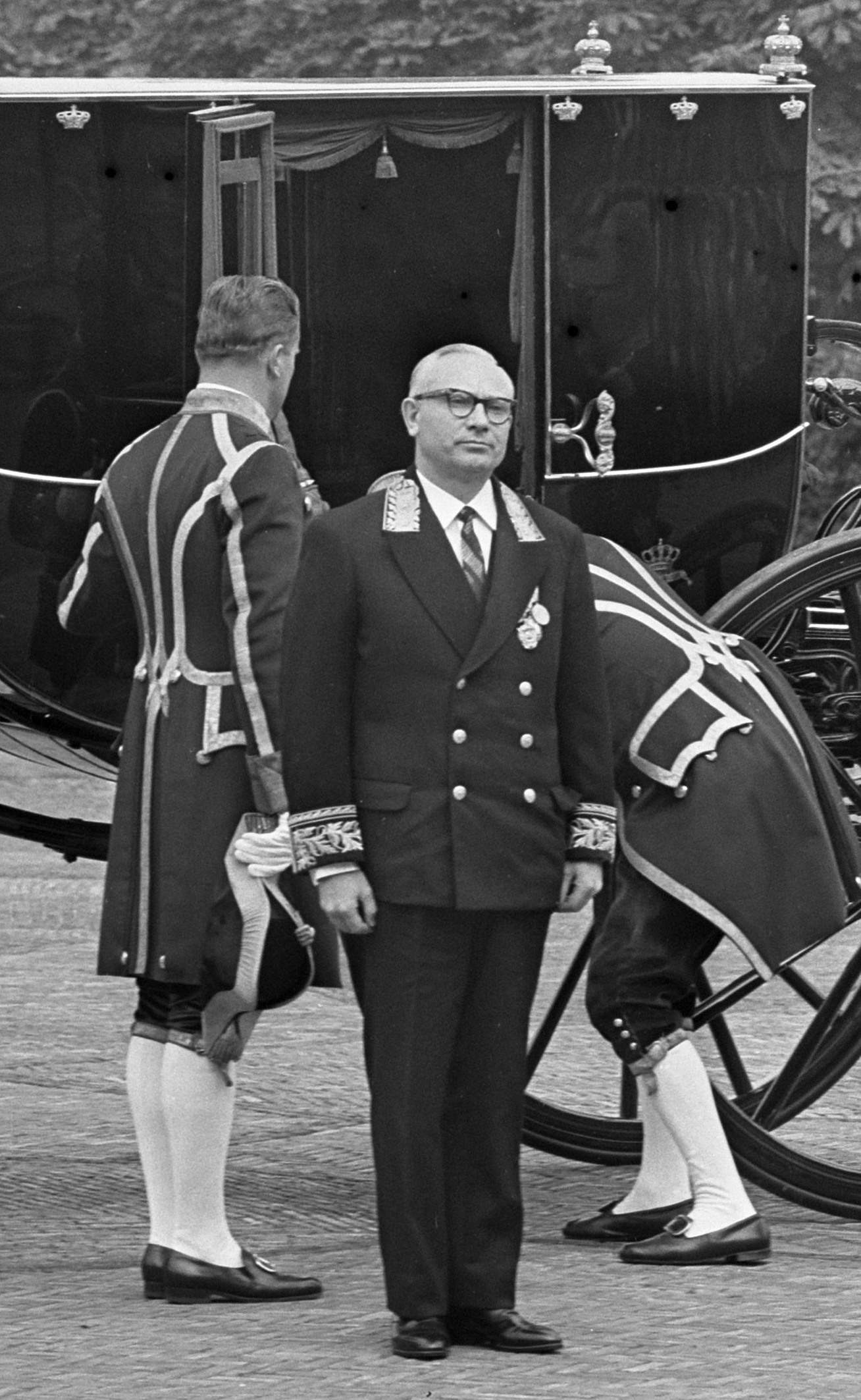
Vladimir Lavrov in 1967, while serving as Soviet ambassador to the Netherlands

The exchange of ambassadors continued into the twentieth century and during the First World War, including after the February Revolution brought an end to Imperial rule and established the Russian Provisional Government. Following the October Revolution which brought the Bolsheviks to power, the government of the Netherlands declined to recognise the new communist regime and relations were again broken off. Relations remained suspended throughout the 1920s and 1930s, and into the start of the Second World War. The Netherlands were invaded and then occupied from 1940, with a Dutch government-in-exile established in London. When Axis forces invaded the Soviet Union in 1941, the USSR joined the Allied side. On 10 July 1942, the USSR established diplomatic relations with the Dutch government-in-exile, as part of the Soviet Embassy to the Allied Governments, with its ambassador, Aleksandr Bogomolov accredited until 1943, and succeeded by Viktor Lebedev until 1945. With the restoration of the independent Dutch state following the war, Vasily Valkov was appointed the new representative. Relations subsequently cooled following Soviet support for the Indonesian National Revolution, and deteriorated further after a series of incidents involving ambassador Panteleimon Ponomarenko, ultimately leading to him being declared persona non grata in 1961. Relations improved during the later part of the Khrushchev Thaw, and ambassadors resumed being appointed in 1963.

=== Russian Federation ===
Exchange of ambassadors continued throughout the rest of the existence of the Soviet Union. With the dissolution of the Soviet Union in 1991, the Netherlands recognised the Russian Federation as its successor state. Incumbent Soviet ambassador Aleksandre Chikvaidze remained in post representing Russia until 1992, and since then ambassadors have continued to be exchanged between the two countries.

== Representatives of Russia to the Netherlands (1699–present) ==
=== Tsardom of Russia to the Dutch Republic (1699–1721) ===
| Name | Title | Appointment | Termination | Notes |
|---|---|---|---|---|
| Andrey Matveyev | Minister Plenipotentiary | 4 April 1699 | 1712 | |
| Boris Kurakin | | 17 October 1711 | 2 November 1721 | |

=== Russian Empire to the Dutch Republic (1721–1795) ===
| Name | Title | Appointment | Termination | Notes |
|---|---|---|---|---|
| Boris Kurakin | | 2 November 1721 | 31 August 1725 | |
| Ivan Golovkin | Envoy | 1725 | 1728 | |
| Ya. Vandenburg | Resident | 1728 | 1731 | |
| Aleksandr Golovkin | Envoy | 27 July 1731 | 31 January 1759 | |
| Alexander Vorontsov | Minister Plenipotentiary | October 1761 | February 1762 | |
| Aleksey Gross | Envoy | 1761 | 1764 | |
| Alexander Vorontsov | Minister Plenipotentiary | 1764 | 1768 | |
| Dmitri Golitsyn | | 1768 | 1782 | |
| Arkady Morkov | Second envoy before 1782; Envoy after 1782 | 20 December 1781 | 1783 | |
| Stepan Kolychyov | Envoy | 1783 | 1793 | |
| Mikhail Novikov | Chargé d'affaires | 1793 | 1795 | |

=== Russian Empire to the Batavian Republic (1795–1806) ===
| Name | Title | Appointment | Termination | Notes |
|---|---|---|---|---|
| Stepan Kolychyov | Envoy | 1797 | 1799 | |
War of the Second Coalition - Diplomatic relations interrupted (1799-1802)
| Gustav Ernst von Stackelberg | Envoy | 1 January 1802 | 5 June 1806 | |
| Karl Gugberg | Acting Chargé d'affaires | April 1802 | September 1802 | |

=== Russian Empire to the Kingdom of Holland (1806–1810) ===
| Name | Title | Appointment | Termination | Notes |
|---|---|---|---|---|
| Gustav Ernst von Stackelberg | Envoy | 5 June 1806 | 11 November 1807 | |
| Sergey Dolgorukov | Envoy | 3 February 1808 | 12 August 1810 | |
War of the Sixth Coalition - Diplomatic relations interrupted (1812-1814)

=== Russian Empire to the Sovereign Principality of the United Netherlands (1814–1815) ===
| Name | Title | Appointment | Termination | Notes |
|---|---|---|---|---|
| Karl Ludwig von Phull | Envoy | 19 May 1814 | 16 March 1815 | |

=== Russian Empire to the United Kingdom of the Netherlands (1815–1839) ===
| Name | Title | Appointment | Termination | Notes |
|---|---|---|---|---|
| Karl Ludwig von Phull | Envoy | 16 March 1815 | 6 April 1821 | |
| Dmitry Tatishchev | Envoy | 23 May 1821 | 5 February 1822 | |
| Peter von Meyendorff | Chargé d'affaires | 20 November 1821 | 5 April 1824 | |
| Pyotr Ubri | Envoy | 8 August 1823 | 5 April 1824 | |
| Nikolai Guryev | Chargé d'affaires before 23 January 1826; Envoy after 23 January 1826 | 5 April 1824 | 9 April 1832 | |
| Ivan Potemkin | Envoy | 9 April 1832 | 16 March 1837 | |
| Frants Maltits | Envoy | 16 March 1837 | 19 April 1839 | |

=== Russian Empire to the Kingdom of the Netherlands (1839–1917) ===
| Name | Title | Appointment | Termination | Notes |
|---|---|---|---|---|
| Frants Maltits | Envoy | 19 April 1839 | 6 December 1853 | |
| Sergey Lomonosov | Envoy | 6 December 1853 | 13 October 1857 | |
| Aleksandr Mansurov | Envoy | 23 October 1857 | 28 May 1866 | |
| Karl Knorring | Envoy | 16 April 1867 | 2 January 1871 | |
| Nikolai Stolypin | Envoy | 6 March 1871 | 1 February 1884 | |
| Pyotr Kapnist | Envoy | 9 February 1884 | 7 June 1892 | |
| Karl von Struve | Envoy | 28 July 1892 | 1905 | |
| Nikolai Charykov | Envoy | 1905 | 1907 | |
| Pyotr Palen | Envoy | 1908 | 1912 | |
| Aleksandr Svechin | Envoy | 4 July 1912 | 3 March 1917 | |

=== Russian Provisional Government to the Kingdom of the Netherlands (1917) ===
| Name | Title | Appointment | Termination | Notes |
|---|---|---|---|---|
| Genrikh Bakh | Chargé d'affaires | March 1917 | 26 October 1917 | |

=== Soviet Union to the Kingdom of the Netherlands (1942–1991) ===
| Name | Title | Appointment | Termination | Notes |
|---|---|---|---|---|
| Aleksandr Bogomolov | Ambassador | 12 January 1943 | 30 November 1943 | To the Dutch government-in-exile as part of the Soviet Embassy to the Allied Governments; Credentials presented on 12 January 1943 |
| Viktor Lebedev | Ambassador | 30 November 1943 | 6 May 1945 | To the Dutch government-in-exile as part of the Soviet Embassy to the Allied Governments; Credentials presented on 24 February 1944 |
| Vasily Valkov | Ambassador | 23 June 1945 | 24 August 1949 | Credentials presented on 31 July 1945 |
| Mikhail Vetrov | Chargé d'affaires | December 1949 | December 1949 | |
| Grigory Zaytsev | Ambassador | 14 December 1949 | 29 July 1953 | Credentials presented on 17 March 1950 |
| Stepan Kirsanov | Ambassador | 29 July 1953 | 30 June 1959 | Credentials presented on 4 September 1953 |
| Panteleimon Ponomarenko | Ambassador | 30 June 1959 | 21 June 1962 | Credentials presented on 4 November 1959; Declared persona non grata |
| Ivan Tugarinov | Ambassador | 7 May 1963 | 10 October 1966 | Credentials presented on 29 May 1963 |
| Vladimir Lavrov | Ambassador | 21 June 1967 | 20 April 1973 | Credentials presented on 6 July 1967 |
| Aleksandr Romanov | Ambassador | 20 April 1973 | 1 February 1979 | Credentials presented on 2 May 1973 |
| Vasily Tolstikov | Ambassador | 1 February 1979 | 3 June 1982 | Credentials presented on 23 February 1979 |
| Viktor Beletsky | Ambassador | 3 June 1982 | 26 February 1985 | Credentials presented on 7 July 1982 |
| Anatoly Blatov | Ambassador | 26 February 1985 | 1 October 1988 | |
| Aleksandre Chikvaidze | Ambassador | 20 October 1988 | 25 December 1991 | |

=== Russian Federation to the Kingdom of the Netherlands (1991–present) ===
| Name | Title | Appointment | Termination | Notes |
|---|---|---|---|---|
| Aleksandre Chikvaidze | Ambassador | 25 December 1991 | 18 March 1992 | |
| Leonid Skotnikov | Ambassador | 18 March 1992 | 17 April 1998 | |
| Aleksandr Khodakov | Ambassador | 17 April 1998 | 20 August 2003 | |
| Kirill Gevorgian | Ambassador | 20 August 2003 | 5 November 2009 | |
| Roman Kolodkin | Ambassador | 5 November 2009 | 15 September 2015 | Credentials presented on 14 January 2010 |
| Aleksandr Shulgin | Ambassador | 15 September 2015 | 5 December 2023 | Credentials presented on 7 October 2015 |
| Vladimir Tarabrin | Ambassador | 5 December 2023 | | Credentials presented on 31 January 2024 |
