= Sergey Lomonosov =

Russian diplomat

Sergey Grigoryevich Lomonosov (Russian: Серге́й Григорьевич Ломоносов) (1799 – October 13, 1857, near Florence) was a Russian diplomat, privy councillor, envoy extraordinary and minister plenipotentiary at the Dutch Royal Court.

Sergey Lomonosov graduated from the Tsarskoye Selo Lyceum with a silver medal in 1817 and then began his career at the Ministry of Foreign Affairs. A year later Lomonosov was sent to the Russian embassy in Washington. Upon his return to St Petersburg in 1821, Sergey Lomonosov was sent to Spain to assist Count Mark Bulgari (a Russian charge d'affairs). After some time he was transferred to Paris as a secretary at the Russian embassy, where he remained until 1829. In 1831, Sergey Lomonosov was appointed chargé d'affaires to Copenhagen and then as first secretary to London. In 1841, he was appointed charge d'affairs to Brazil. During his stay in South America, he travelled along the Brazilian coast from Rio de Janeiro to the estuary of the Amazon River and probably became the first Russian ever to introduce this country to Russia. In 1848, Sergey Lomonosov was transferred to Portugal. In 1853, he was appointed envoy extraordinary and minister plenipontetiary at the Dutch Royal Court, keeping this post until his death in 1857.
