= Biletsky =

Biletsky / Biletskyy / Biletskyi (Ukrainian: Білецький), feminine: Biletska is a Ukrainian surname, phonetic transliteration of the Polish surname Bielecki.

- Alla Biletska (born 2003), Ukrainian track cyclist
- Andrew Bilesky, Canadian curler
- Andriy Biletsky (born 1979), Ukrainian far-right politician and military commander
- Maksym Biletskyi (born 1980), Ukrainian footballer
- Mariia Biletska (1864–1937), Ukrainian teacher
- Volodymyr Biletskyy (born 1950), Ukrainian scientist, politician, activist
