= Vladimir Lavrov =

Russian diplomat and ambassador

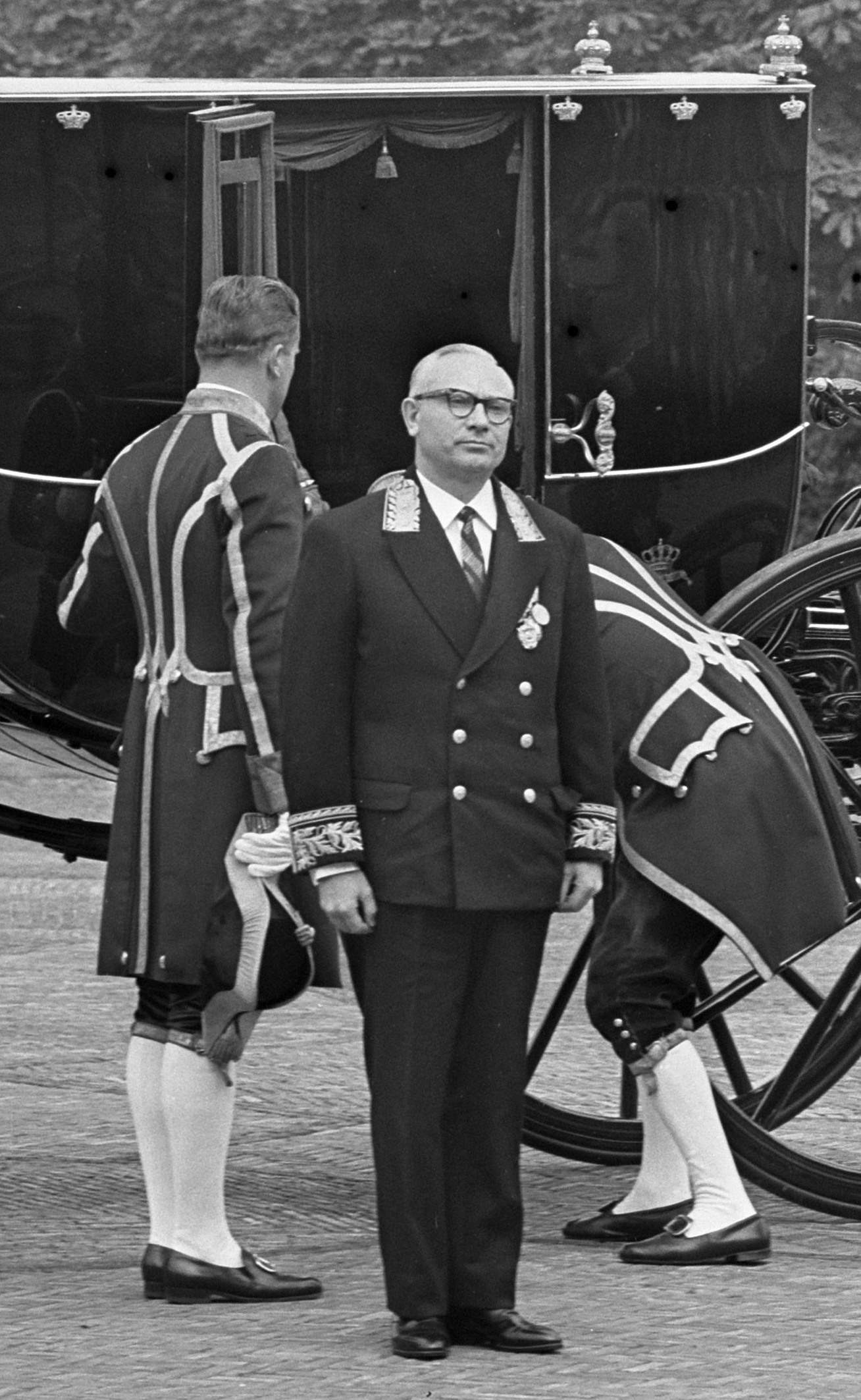
Vladimir Lavrov in the Netherlands in 1967

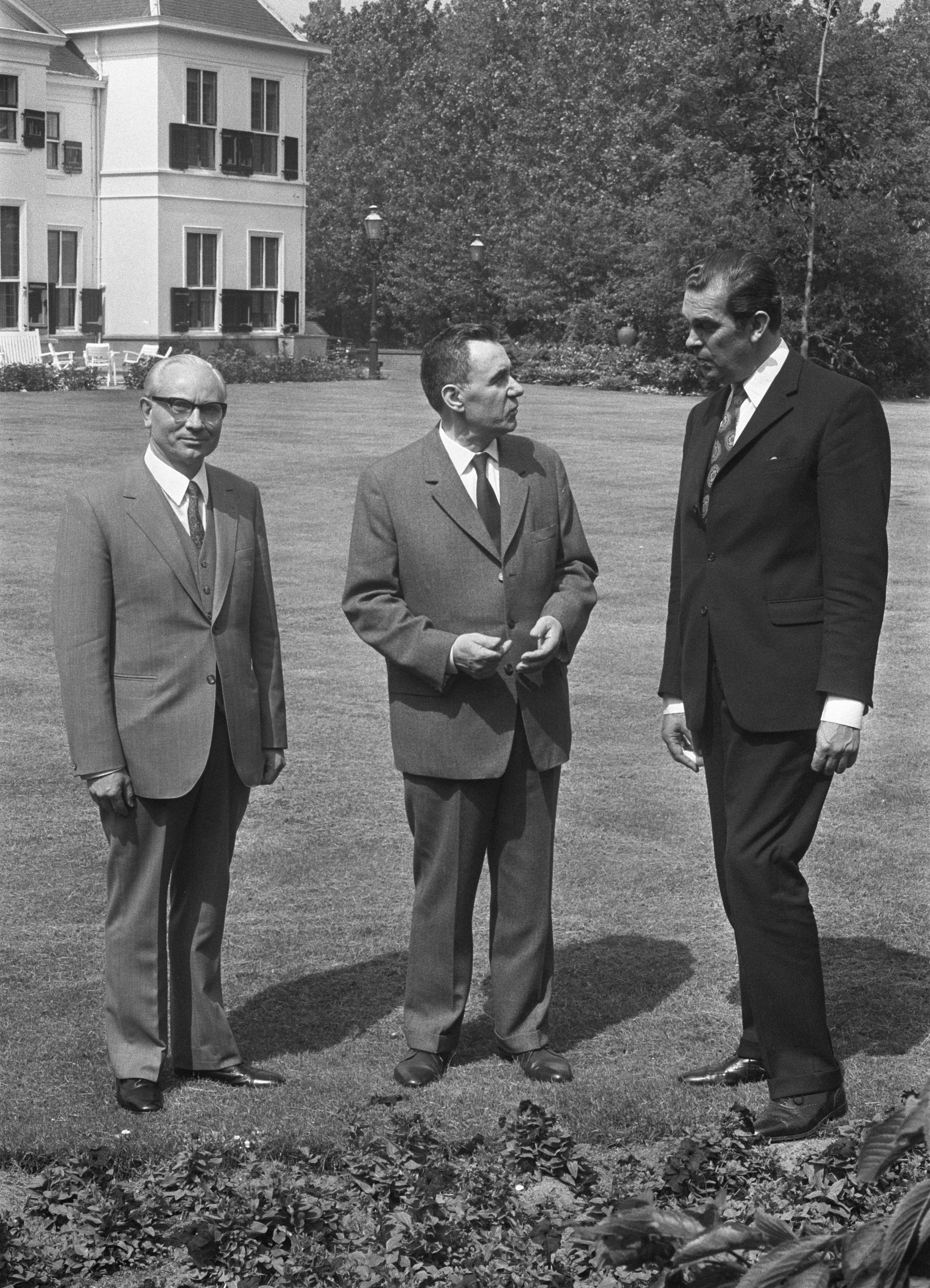
Vladimir Lavrov, Andrei Gromyko and Barend Biesheuvel in 1972

Vladimir Sergeyevich Lavrov (Russian: Владимир Сергеевич Лавров; 4 October, 1919 – 7 June, 2011) was a Russian diplomat and ambassador of the Soviet Union.

Lavrov graduated from the Moscow Power Engineering Institute and Diplomatic Academy of the Ministry of Foreign Affairs of the Russian Federation and defended a habilitation in historical sciences. He took the following diplomatic positions:

- 1947–1952 – official of the Ministry of Foreign Affairs
- 1952–1953 – First Secretary of the Soviet Embassy to the United Kingdom
- 1953–1956 – assistant to the Deputy Foreign Minister of the Soviet Union
- 1956–1959 – adviser at the Soviet Embassy to the United States
- 1959–1960 – curator of Soviet-Yemen relations
- 1960–1964 – senior official at the European division of the Ministry of Foreign Affairs
- 1964–1967 – Ambassador of the Soviet Union to Kenya
- 1967–1973 – Ambassador of the Soviet Union to the Netherlands
- 1973–1977 – director of the Personnel Division at the Ministry of Foreign Affairs
- 1977–1983 – Ambassador of the Soviet Union to Switzerland
- 1983–1987 – Ambassador of the Soviet Union to Turkey
