= List of ambassadors of Russia to Kenya =

Ambassador of the Russian Federation to the Republic of Kenya
- Emblem of the Russian Foreign Ministry
- Incumbent; Vsevolod Tkachenko since 20 August 2024
- Ministry of Foreign Affairs; Embassy of Russia in Nairobi
- Style: His Excellency; The Honourable
- Reports to: Minister of Foreign Affairs
- Seat: Nairobi
- Appointer: President of Russia
- Term length: At the pleasure of the president
- Website: Embassy of Russia in Kenya

The ambassador extraordinary and plenipotentiary of the Russian Federation to Kenya is the official representative of the president and the government of the Russian Federation to the president and the government of Kenya.

The ambassador and his staff work at large in the Embassy of Russia in Nairobi. The post of Russian ambassador to Kenya is currently held by Vsevolod Tkachenko, incumbent since 20 August 2024. The ambassador to Kenya is concurrently accredited as Russia's permanent representative to the United Nations Office at Nairobi.

== History of diplomatic relations ==
Following Kenyan independence, the Soviet Union moved to open diplomatic relations, with an agreement signed on 14 December 1963. The first ambassador, Vladimir Lavrov, was appointed on 28 January 1964. Following the dissolution of the Soviet Union in 1991, Kenya recognised the Russian Federation as its successor state, and the incumbent Soviet ambassador, Vladimir Kitayev, continued in post as the Russian ambassador until 1992.

== List of representatives (1964–present) ==
=== Soviet Union to Kenya (1964–1991) ===
Name	Title	Appointment	Termination	Notes
Vladimir Lavrov	Ambassador	28 January 1964	23 May 1967	Presented credentials on 12 March 1964
Dmitry Goryunov	Ambassador	23 May 1967	13 November 1973	Presented credentials on 18 July 1967
Boris Miroshnichenko	Ambassador	13 November 1973	21 May 1983	Presented credentials on 5 December 1973
Aleksandre Chikvaidze	Ambassador	21 May 1983	28 June 1985	Presented credentials on 9 July 1983
Vladimir Ostashko	Ambassador	28 June 1985	14 July 1989	
Vladimir Kitayev	Ambassador	14 July 1989	25 December 1991	

=== Russian Federation to Kenya (1991–present) ===
Name	Title	Appointment	Termination	Notes
Vladimir Kitayev	Ambassador	25 December 1991	1 September 1992	
Boris Mayorsky	Ambassador	1 September 1992	21 July 1998	
Boris Tsepov	Ambassador	21 July 1998	5 December 2000	
Aleksandr Ignatyev	Ambassador	5 December 2000	27 July 2005	
Valery Yegoshkin	Ambassador	27 July 2005	23 December 2010	
Aleksandr Makarenko	Ambassador	23 December 2010	4 May 2018	
Dmitry Maksimychev	Ambassador	4 May 2018	20 August 2024	Presented credentials on 18 September 2018
Vsevolod Tkachenko	Ambassador	20 August 2024		Presented credentials on 4 December 2024
