= Jerzy Bielecki =

Jerzy Bielecki may refer to:

- Jerzy Bielecki (prisoner) (1921–2011), Polish social worker who escaped Auschwitz successfully, received the Righteous Among the Nations award
- Jerzy Bielecki (politician) (born 1969), Polish politician

== See also ==
- Bielecki (surname)
