= Bielecki =

Bielecki (Polish pronunciation: [bjɛˈlɛt͡ski]; feminine: Bielecka; plural: Bieleccy) is a Polish-language surname. It is related to a number of surnames in other languages.

Language	Masculine	Feminine
Polish	Bielecki	Bielecka
Belarusian (Romanization)	Бялецкі (Bialetski, Bialecki)	Бялецкая (Bialetskaya, Bialeckaja)
Lithuanian	Beleckas, Beleckis	Beleckienė (married); Beleckaitė (unmarried)
Romanian/Moldovan	Belețchi	
Russian (Romanization)	Белецкий (Beletskiy, Beletskii, Beletsky)	Белецкая (Beletskaya, Beletskaia)
Ukrainian (Romanization)	Білецький (Bileckyj, Biletskyi, Biletsky, Biletskyy) Белецький (Beleckyj, Beletskyi, Beletsky, Beletskyy)	Білецька (Bilecka, Biletska) Белецька (Belecka, Beletska)

== People ==
- Adam Bielecki (born 1983), Polish climber
- Barbara Bielecka (1931–2019), Polish architect
- Czesław Bielecki (born 1951), Polish architect and politician
- Jan Czesław Bielecki (born 1940), Polish politician
- Jan Krzysztof Bielecki (born 1951), Polish politician
- Jerzy Bielecki (disambiguation), multiple individuals
- Karol Bielecki (born 1982), Polish handball player
- Maciej Bielecki (born 1987), Polish cyclist
- Mike Bielecki (born 1959), American baseball player
- Stanisław Bielecki (born 1946), Polish chemist
- Tadeusz Bielecki (1901–1982), Polish politician
