= Vasily Tolstikov =

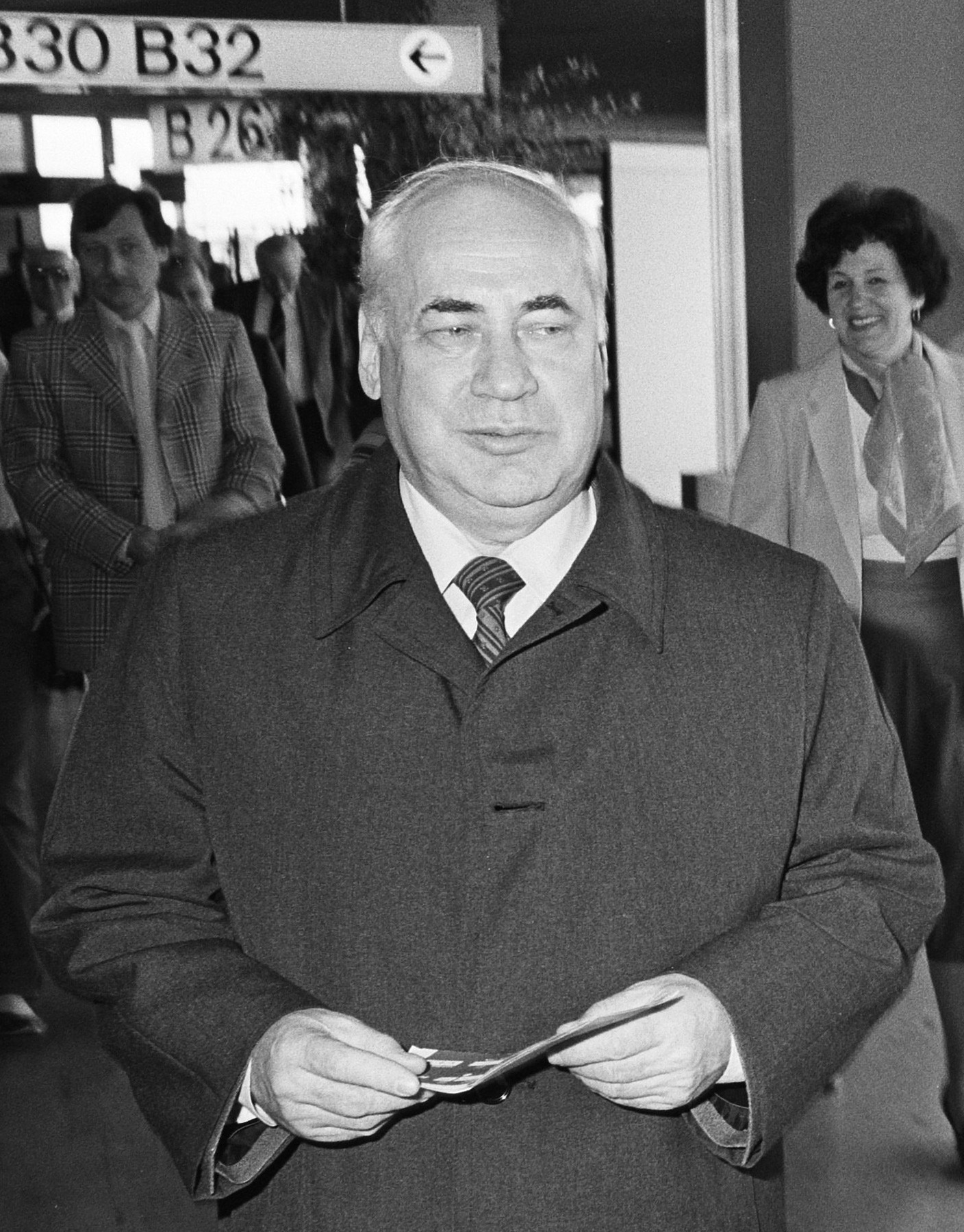
Tolstikov in 1982

Vasily Sergeyevich Tolstikov (Russian: Василий Сергеевич Толстиков; 6 November 1917 – 29 April 2003) was a Soviet diplomat and Communist Party official.

Tolstikov was born in a family of a public servant. After graduating from the Petersburg State Transport University in 1940 he served in the army until 1946 and fought in World War II. Between 1946 and 1952 he took various posts in building construction organizations of Saint Petersburg, and then served as a party official in the city, eventually assuming the leading party position of First Secretary (1962–1970). After that he was sent as ambassador to China (1970–1979) and to the Netherlands (1979–1982). Tolstikov had no prior knowledge of foreign languages and diplomacy; besides, he had to start from scratch as there was no Soviet ambassador in China in 1964–1970. Nevertheless, Tolstikov managed to normalize the China-USSR relationship.
