= Ivan Tugarinov =

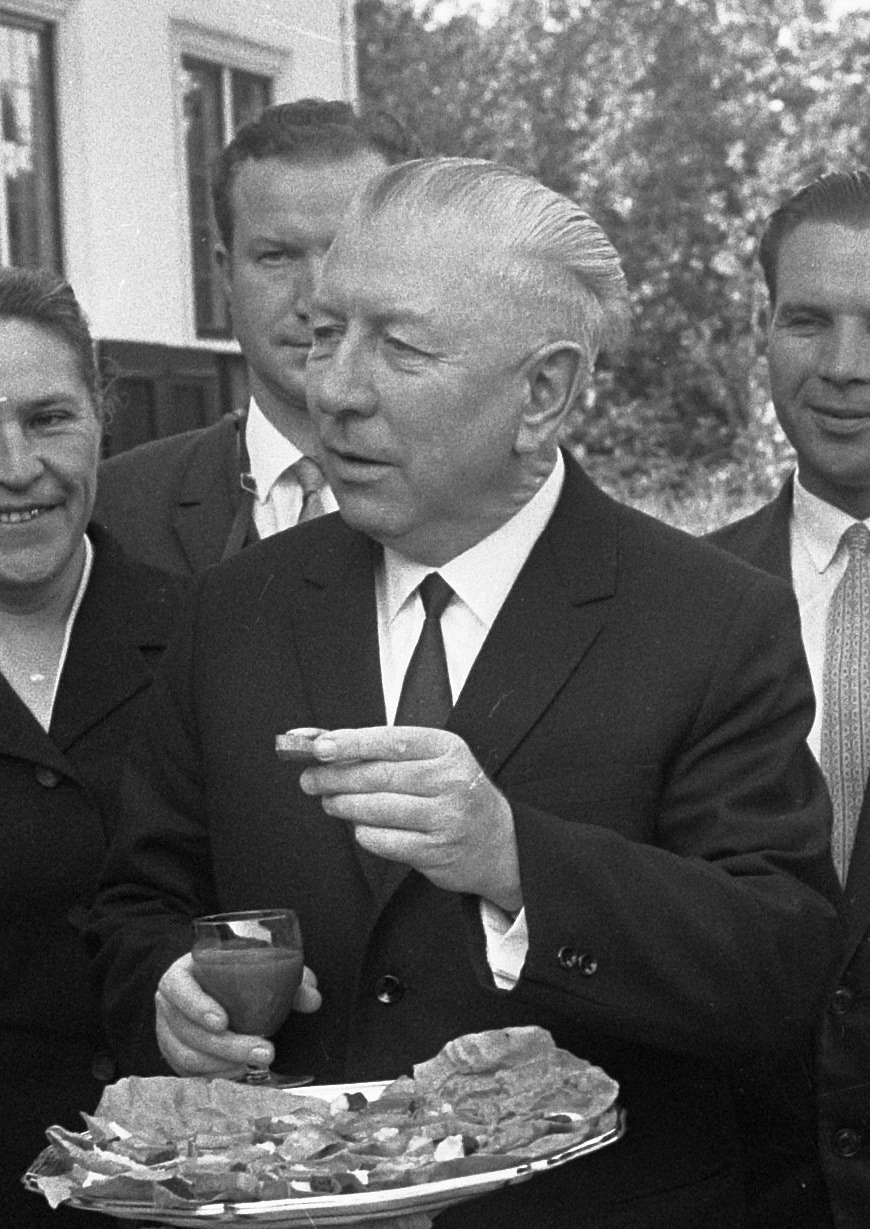
Ivan Tugarinov in 1966

Ivan Ivanovich Tugarinov (Russian: Иван Иванович Тугаринов; 1905 – 10 October 1966) was a Soviet diplomat.

Tugarinov was born in Moscow Oblast. Between 1945 and 1948 he was an official of the Soviet administration in Germany and then, until 1963, took various leading posts at the Soviet Ministry of Foreign Affairs. He was the Soviet Ambassador to the Netherlands from 7 May 1963 until his death on 10 October 1966; he died in Amsterdam.
