= Viktor Beletsky =

Soviet ambassador

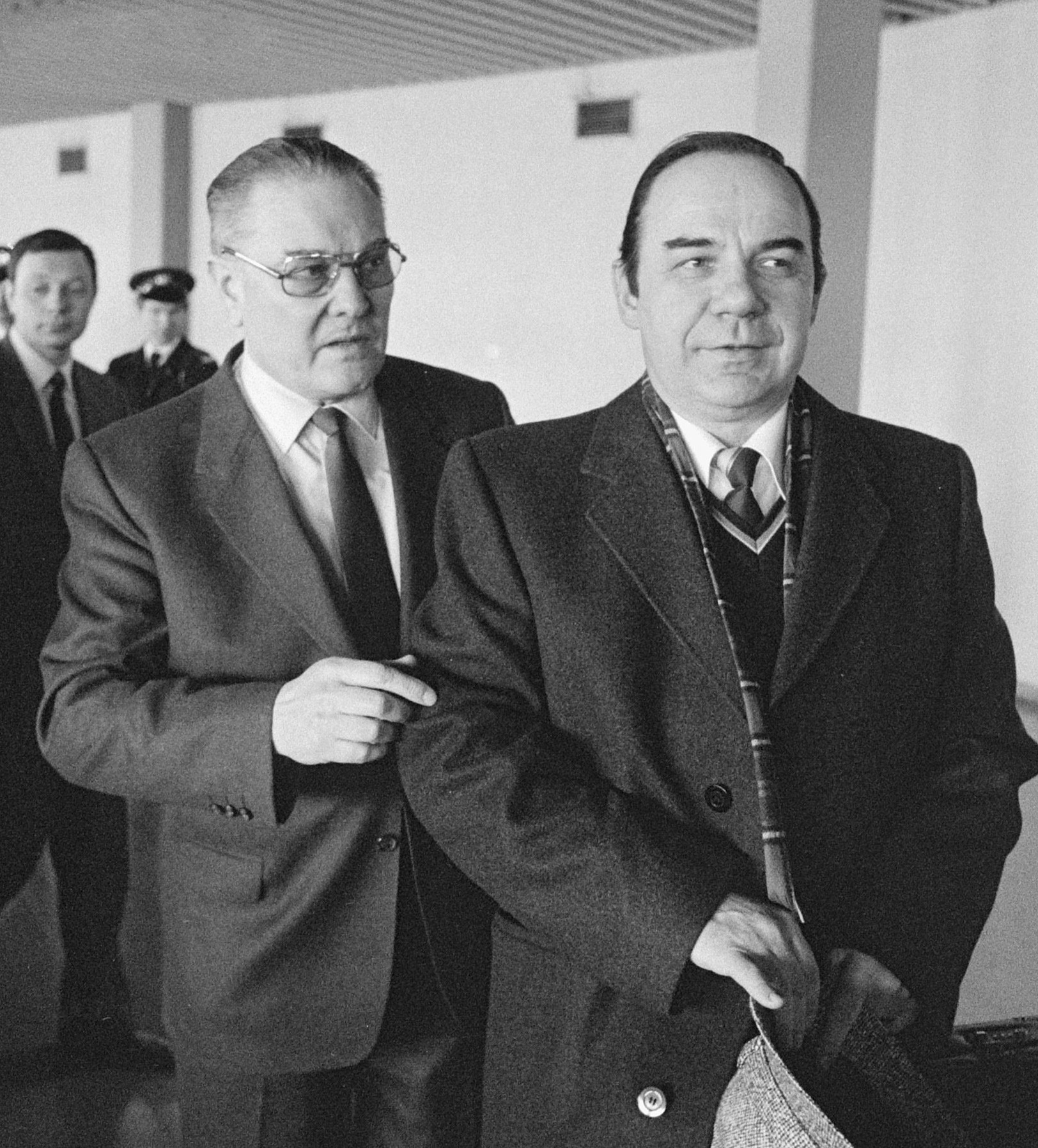
Beletsky (left) accompanying Anatoly Gromyko in the Netherlands in 1985

Viktor Nikolaevich Beletsky (Russian: Виктор Николаевич Белецкий; 1928 – late 1990s) was a Soviet diplomat and ambassador.

Beletsky defended a habilitation in historical sciences. He held the following positions:

- 1954–1958 – official of the Soviet Embassy to Austria
- 1958–1961 – official of the Ministry of Foreign Affairs
- 1961–1968 – official of the Soviet Embassy to East Germany
- 1969–1972 – official at the Ministry of Foreign Affairs
- 1972–1974 – official of the Soviet Embassy to East Germany
- 1974–1978 – official of the Soviet Embassy to Czechoslovakia
- 1978–1980 – deputy rector of the Diplomatic Academy of the Ministry of Foreign Affairs of the Russian Federation
- 1980–1982 – official of the Soviet Embassy to East Germany
- 1982–1985 – ambassador of the Soviet Union to the Netherlands

Beletsky was married to Rimma and had two stepsons, born ca. 2001 and 2013. His family disappeared in 2013 under unclear circumstances.
