= Aleksandrs Apsītis =

Latvian illustrator (1880–1943)

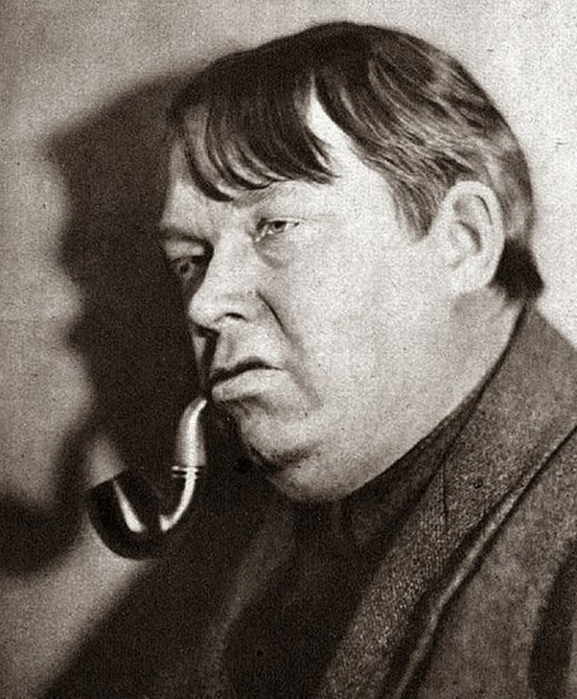
Aleksandrs Apsītis

Aleksandrs Apsītis (April 6, 1880 – 1943; Russian: Александр Петрович Апсит, romanized: Aleksandr Petrovich Apsit) was a Russian and Latvian graphic artist, draftsman, watercolorist, and lithographer, known as a book and magazine illustrator. He also created posters and propaganda leaflets. His aliases include А. Петров, Скиф, Апсид, Осинин.

== Biography ==
Aleksandrs Apsītis was born in Riga to the family of a blacksmith. After taking lessos with Lev Dmitriyev-Kavkazsky in St. Petersburg, he moved to New Athos, where he illustrated books about the monastery. In 1901 he returned to St. Petersburg and started illustrating various magazines and created advertising posters. In 1905 he moved to Moscow, where he illustrated books. During World War I he created many military-themed color pastels. After the Russian Revolution he became one of the first political propaganda poster artists, while continuing illustrating books and magazines. In 1921, as a native of Riga he repatriated to Latvia. Since 1939 he lived in Germany. He died in Ludwigslust, Germany.

In 1913 he illustrated the first Russian children's encyclopedia.

His works are found in a number of museums in Russia and Latvia, as well as in private collections.

== Gallery ==
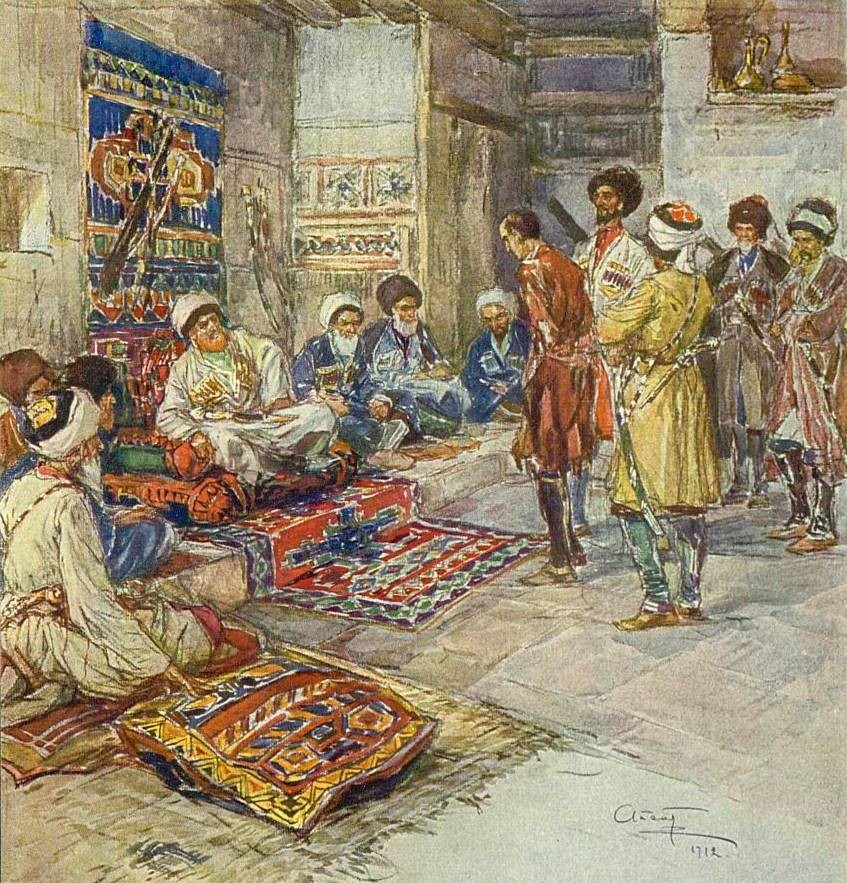
Illustration to Hadji Murat by Leo Tolstoy, 1914

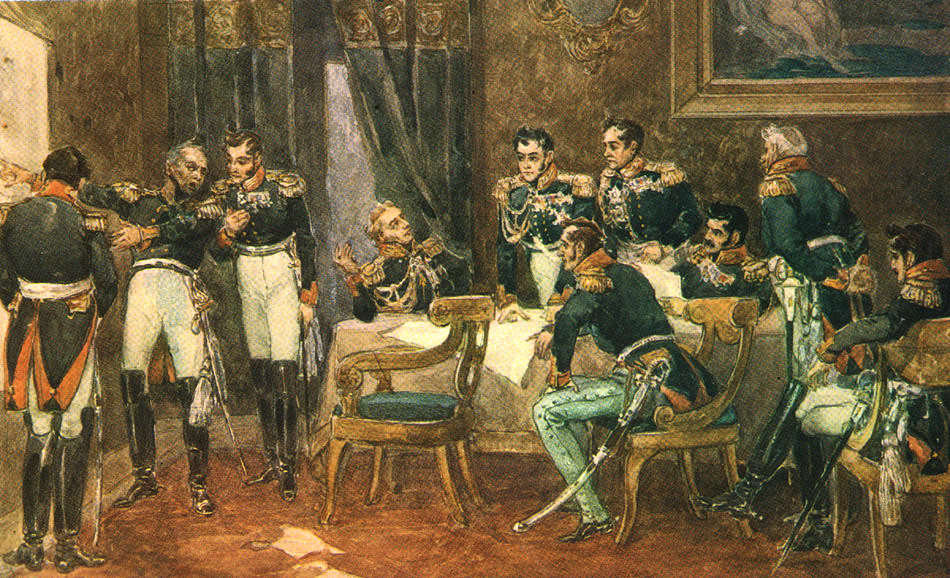
1812 Military Council in Drissa, 1912

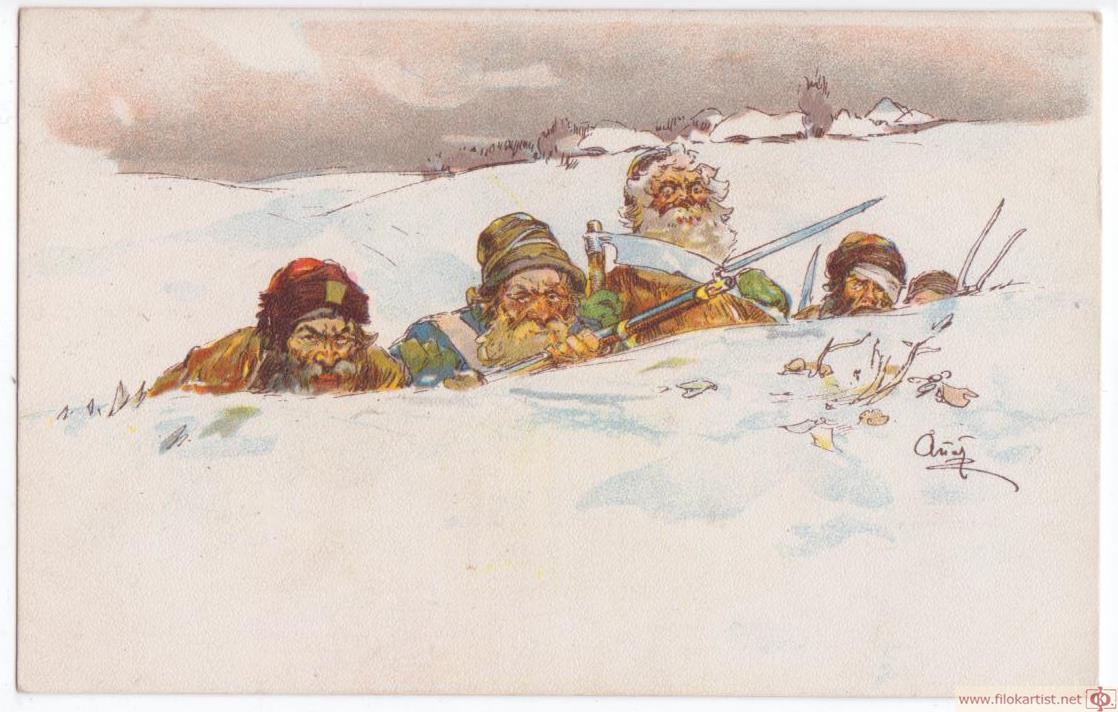
Russian partisans of the 1812 French invasion of Russia

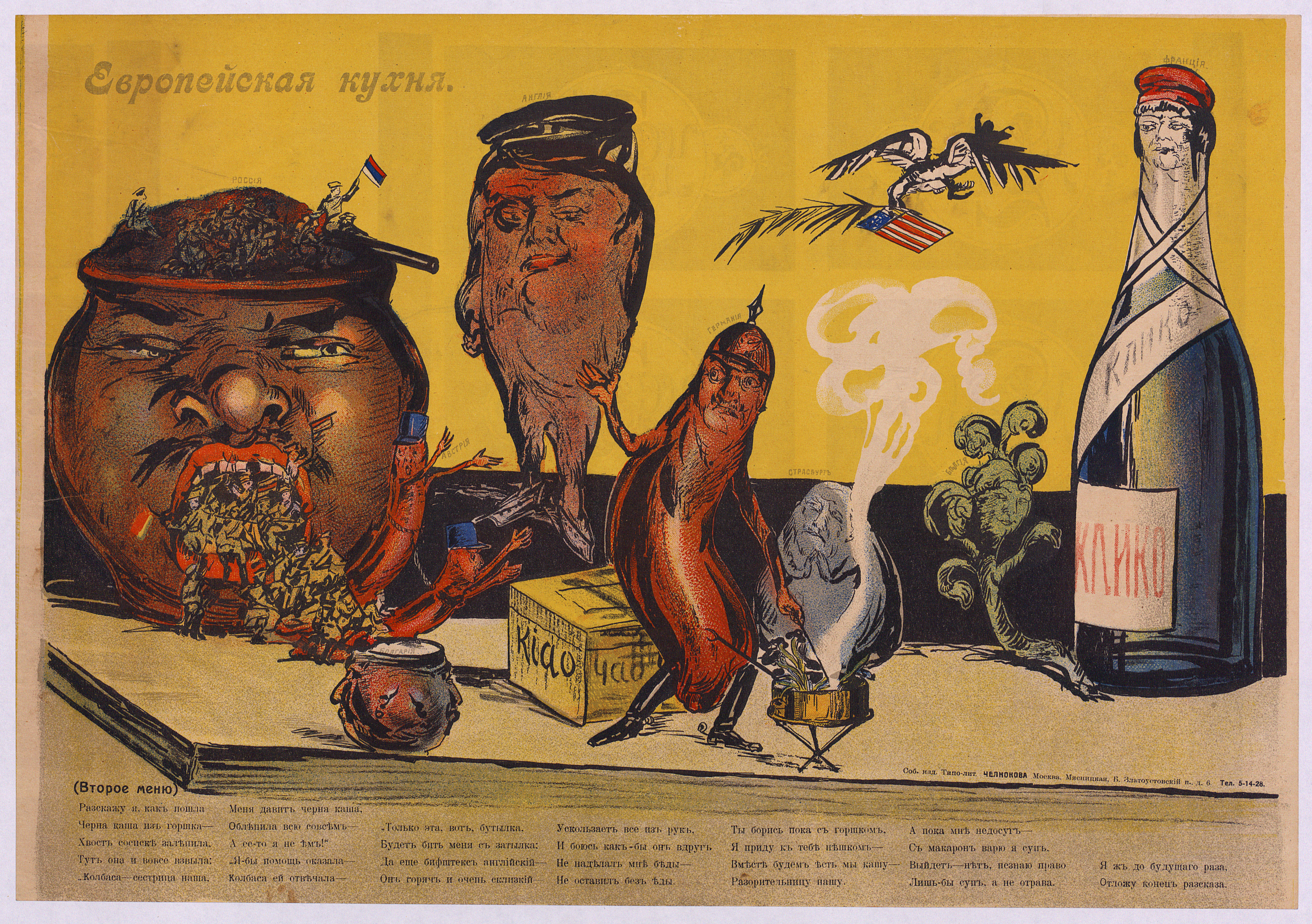
"European Cuisine", a WWI political caricature

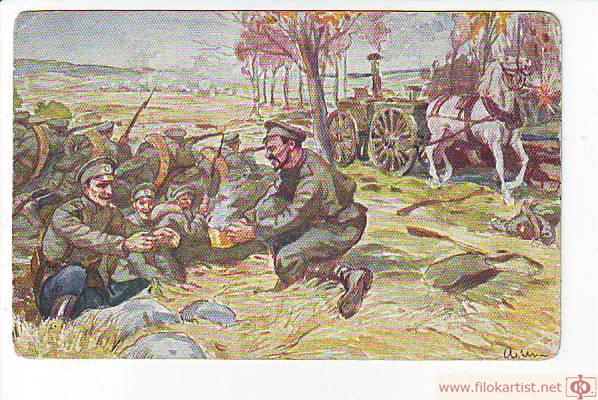
"Brave Cook"

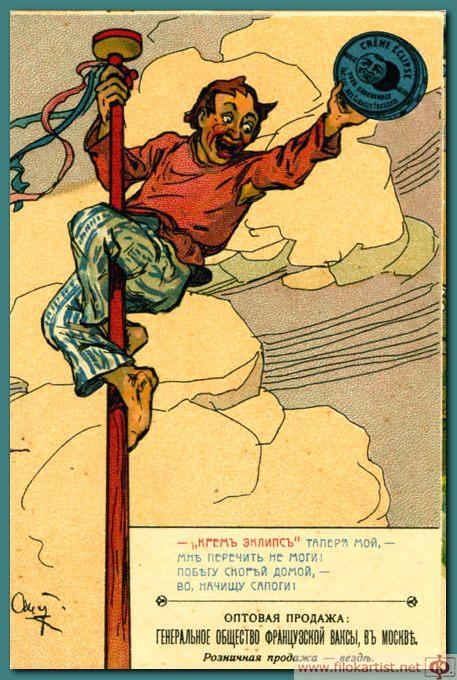
A lucky pole climber at a fair wins shoe polish (advertisement)

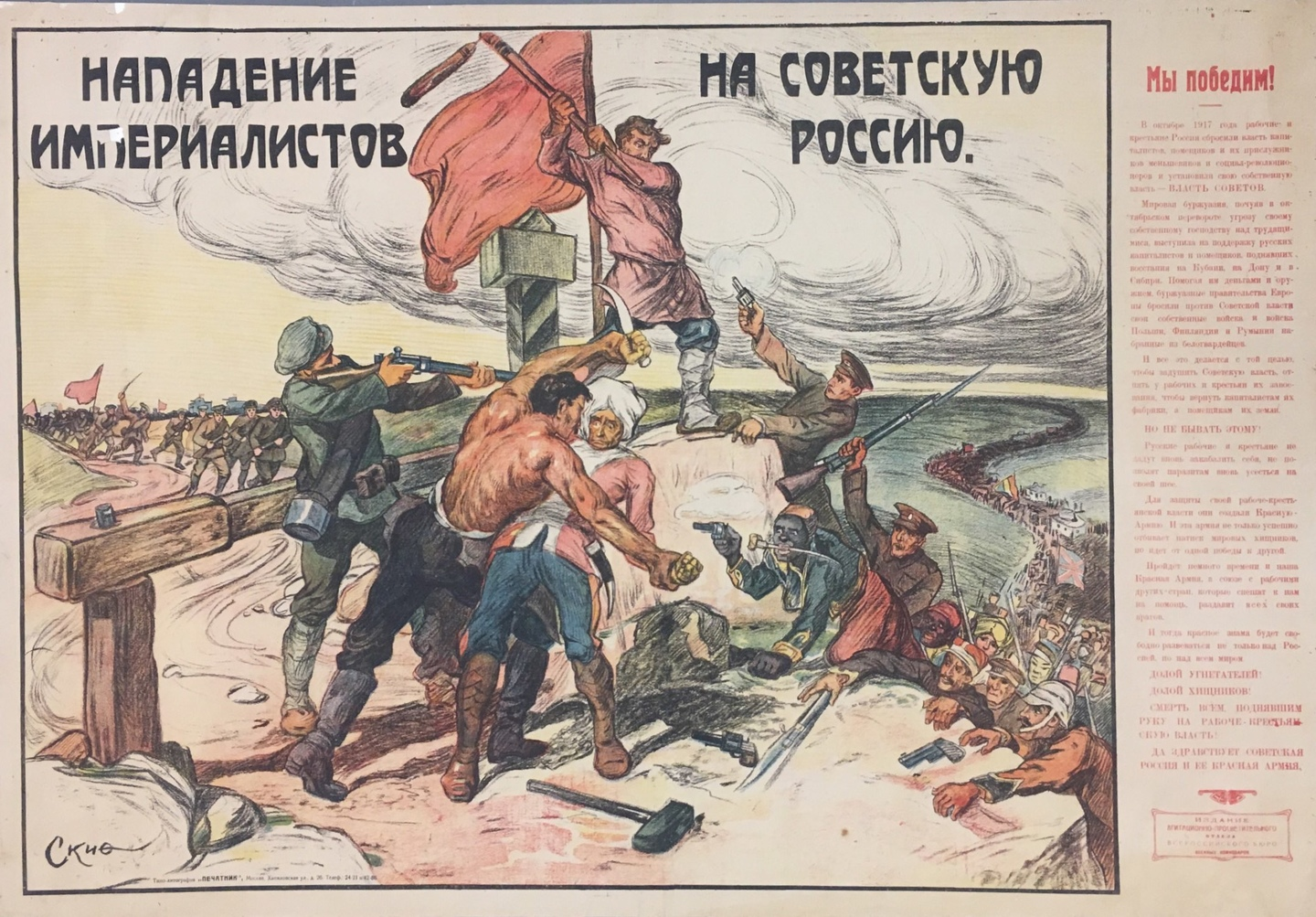
"Imperialists Attacking Russia." "We Shal Win!" (1918)

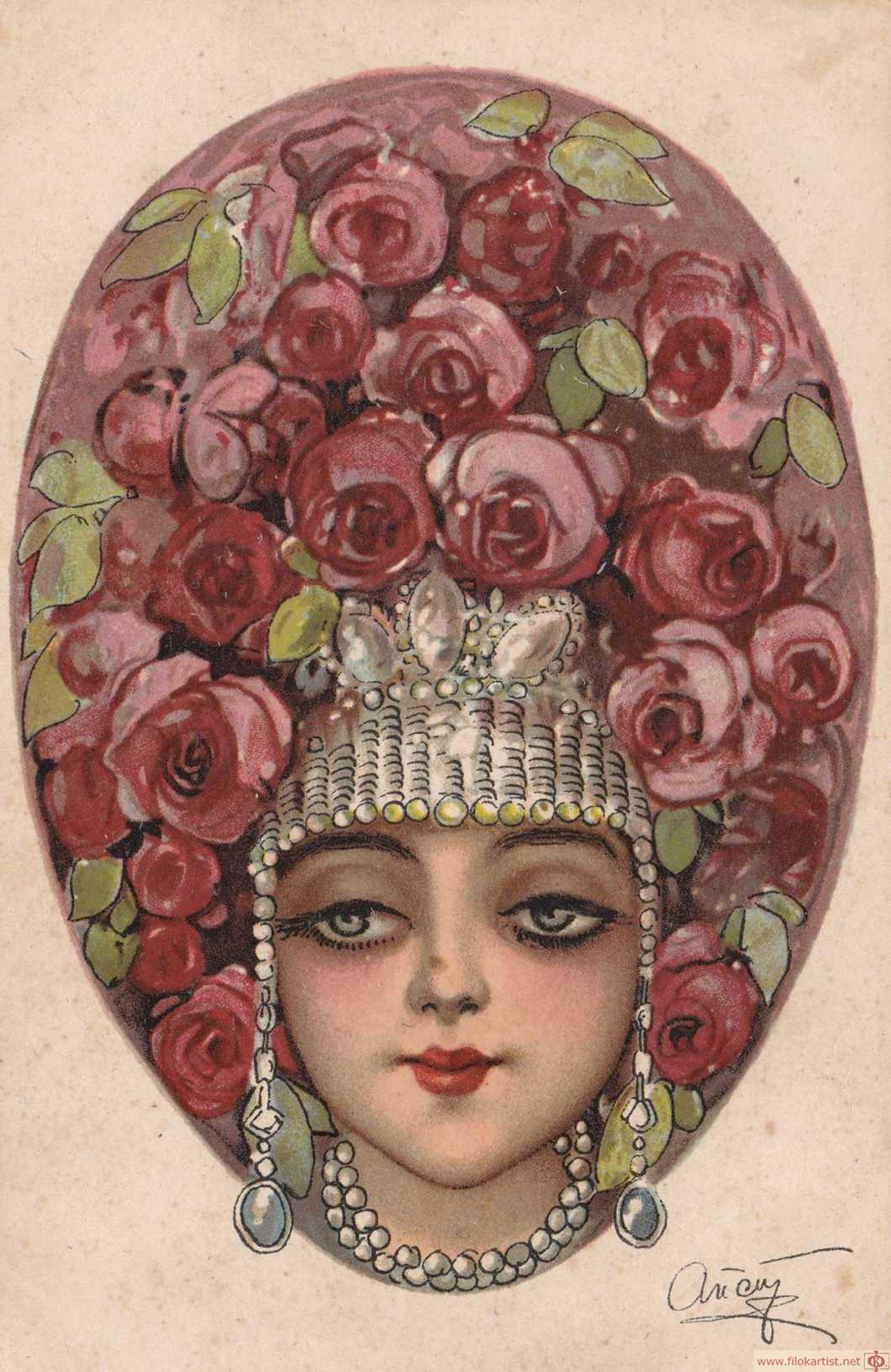
"Mama", a candy box

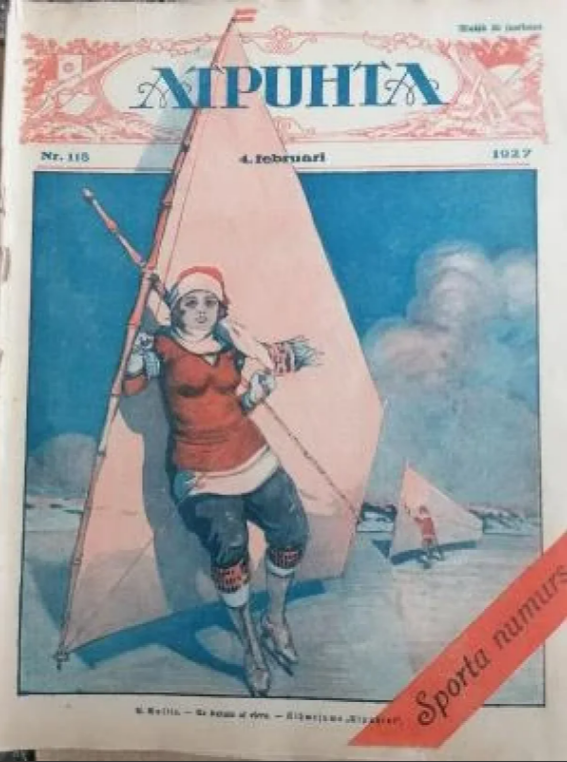
Ice skating with a sail (Latvia, 1927)

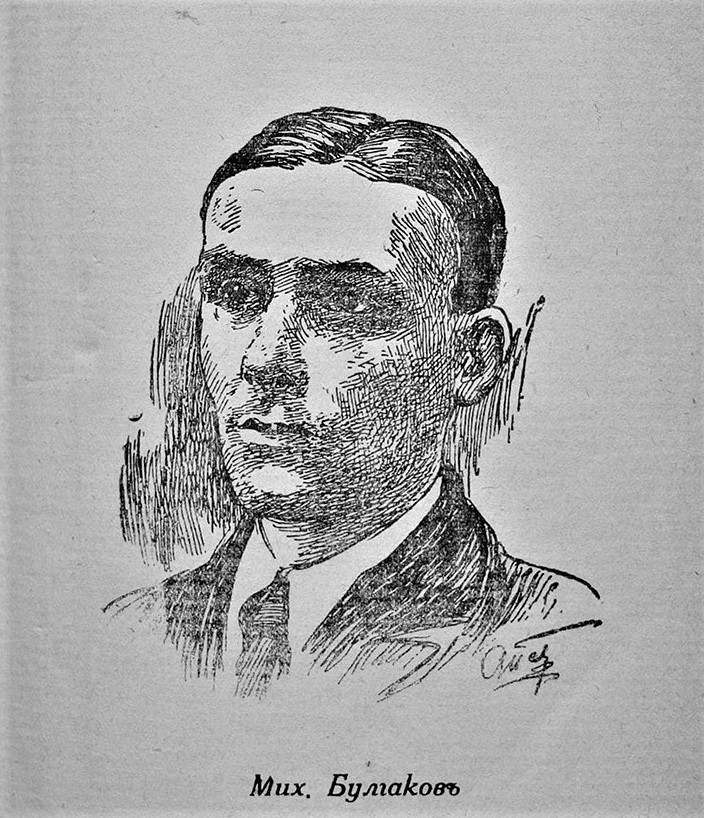
Portrait of Mikhail Bulgakov, 1927

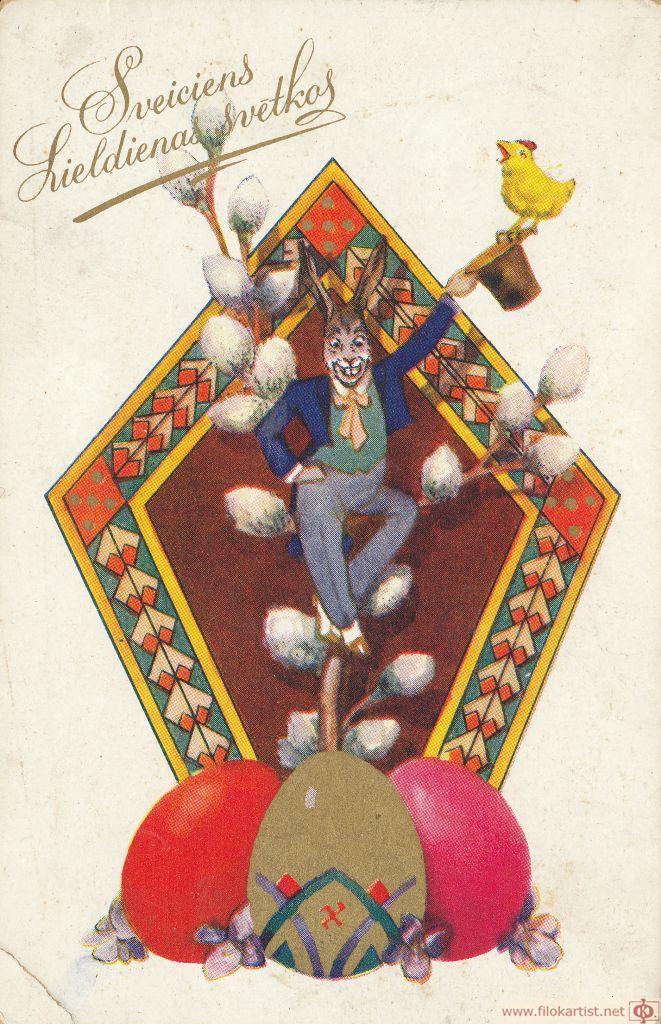
Easter postcard, Latvia
