= Georgia–NATO relations =

- NATO: Georgia

Georgia and the North Atlantic Treaty Organization (NATO) enjoy cordial relations. Georgia is not currently a member of NATO, but has been promised by NATO to be admitted in the future.

Cooperation officially began in 1994 when Georgia joined the NATO-run Partnership for Peace. Georgia has moved quickly following the Rose Revolution in 2003 to seek closer ties and eventual membership with NATO (although the previous administration had also indicated that they desired NATO membership a year before the revolution took place). Georgia's powerful northern neighbor, Russia, has opposed the closer ties, including those expressed at the 2008 Bucharest summit where NATO members promised that Georgia would eventually join the organization. In the 7 December 2011 statement of the North Atlantic Council Georgia was designated as an "aspirant country".

Complications in the relationship between NATO and Georgia include the presence of Russian forces in Georgian territory as a result of multiple recent conflicts, like the 2008 South Ossetia war, over the territories of Abkhazia and South Ossetia, which are home to large numbers of Russian nationals. A nonbinding referendum in 2008 resulted in 77% of voters supporting NATO accession.

The current Georgia–NATO relations occur in the framework of the Substantial NATO–Georgia Package (SNGP), a set of measures at the strategic, tactical and operational levels launched in 2014. The package includes a Defence Institution Building School, NATO–Georgia Joint Training and Evaluation Centre and Logistics Facility, the facilitation of multi-national and regional military drills, and other measures.

== Background ==
Map of NATO in Europe: Members of NATO Membership Action Plan Intensified Dialogue / Individual Partnership Action Plan Partnership for Peace Aspiring Partnership for Peace members

Georgia has sought to join NATO, which it views as a guarantee of stability to the region by acting as a counterweight to Russia, which it considers a dangerous neighbor. Located on the northeastern border of NATO member Turkey, Georgia is the furthest from the Atlantic of all countries currently considering NATO membership. Article 10 of the North Atlantic Treaty limits membership extension to European states. Georgia's location on the juncture of continents is a subject of debate, yet similarly positioned Turkey has been a member of NATO since 1952 but Turkey has a part of its territory clearly in the European continent, over 600 miles (970 km) to the West and in the European Shores of the Black Sea, while Georgia has traditionally been considered as the northernmost area of Western Asia.

In 2006, the Georgian parliament voted unanimously for a bill which calls for the integration of Georgia into NATO. On 5 January 2008 Georgia held a non-binding referendum on NATO membership with 77% voting in favor of joining the organization.

Russia sees NATO's eastward expansion as a threat against their strategic interests in Europe and has accused the West of having double standards.

== Post-Soviet era ==
NATO member states Partnership for Peace countries Mediterranean Dialogue countries Contact countries

During the collapse of the Soviet Union, the nationalist leadership of Zviad Gamsakhurdia came to power in Georgia. On 9 April 1991, the Supreme Council declared Georgia's independence after a referendum held on 31 March. Georgia was the first non-Baltic republic of the Soviet Union to officially declare independence. It immediately had problems with Russian support of Ossetian separatists in Georgia. Like others, Georgia joined the NATO-run North Atlantic Cooperation Council in 1992 and the Partnership for Peace, signing their agreement on March 23, 1994. Georgia was a founding member of the Collective Security Treaty Organization, an alternative Russian-led military alliance, in 1994, but withdrew in 1999.

In 1996, Georgia submitted their first Individual Partnership Plan, and in 1997 ratified the Status of Forces Agreement. Georgia opened official relations with NATO in 1998 by opening a diplomatic mission and presenting an ambassador.

The first joint military exercises occurred in Poti in 2001, with more in 2002.

In 2002, at the NATO summit in Prague, President Eduard Shevardnadze, for the first time, officially requested invitation to join NATO:

[...] I can also assure you that perhaps the only issue in the recent years against which no reasonable argument has ever been suggested is the Georgian public's perspective on the future of the country's national security which is widely seen in the context of the country's membership in the North Atlantic Alliance. I am happy that at the Summit of the Euro-Atlantic Partnership Council I can declare that Georgia is determined to be a full member of NATO and is resolved to work hard to prepare for this historic mission.

— President Shevardnadze

The 2003 Rose Revolution replaced Georgian president Eduard Shevardnadze with Mikheil Saakashvili, who promoted closer ties with western institutions including NATO.

In 2004, Georgian forces started to work with NATO forces in the International Security Assistance Force in Afghanistan, as part of the election security force.

On 14 February 2005 Georgia and NATO signed an agreement on the appointment of Partnership for Peace (PfP) liaison officer. The liaison office between them came into force then and was assigned to Georgia. On 2 March 2005, the agreement was signed on the provision of the host nation supporting and aiding transit of NATO forces and NATO personnel. On March 6–9, 2006, the Individual Partnership Action Plan (IPAP) implementation interim assessment team arrived in Tbilisi.

On 13 April 2006, the discussion of the assessment report on implementation of the IPAP was held at NATO Headquarters, within 26+1 format.

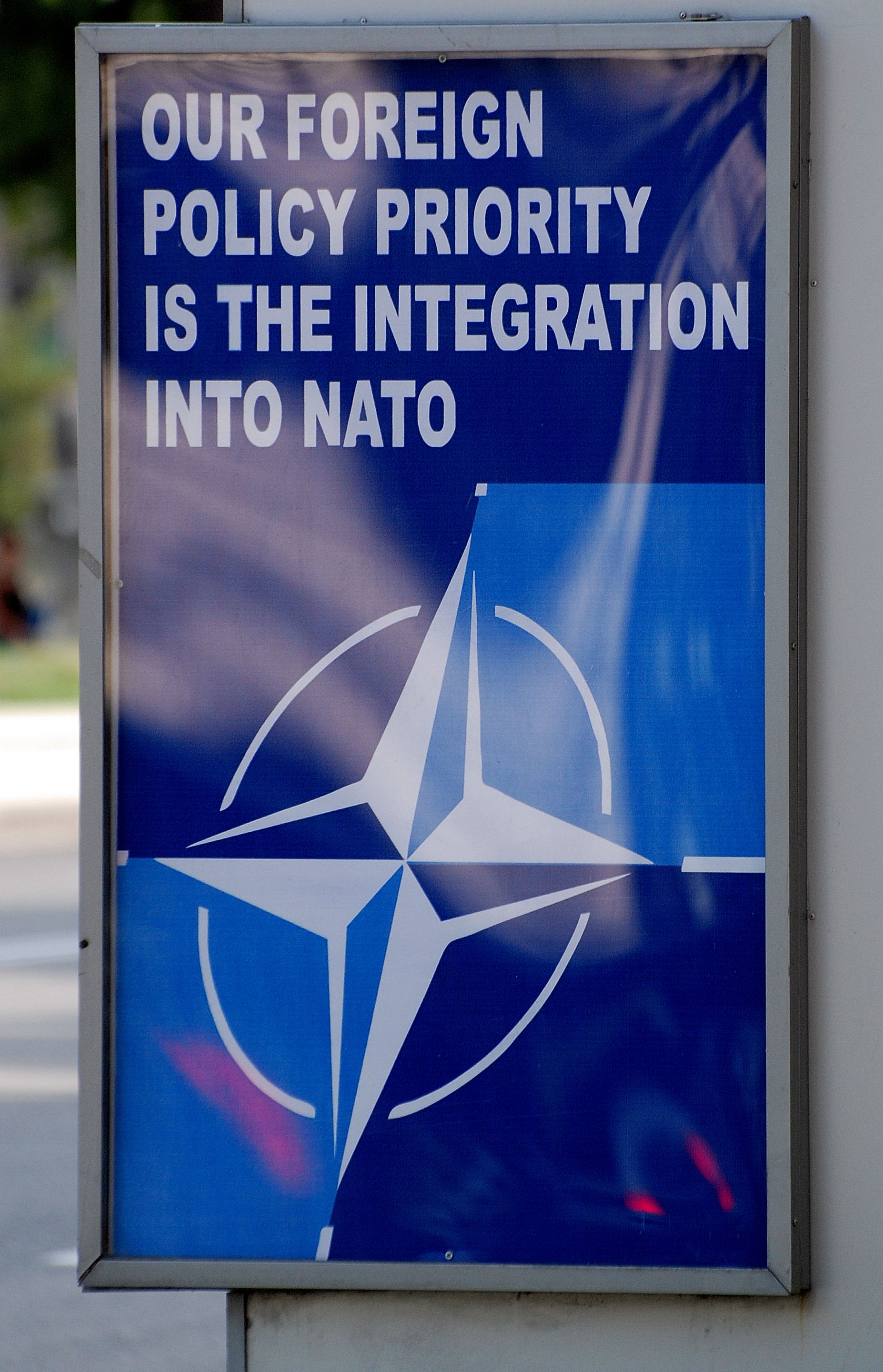
An August 2009 sign seen in downtown Tbilisi promoting Georgia's integration with NATO

In September 2006, Georgia became the second country to be offered the "Intensified Dialogue" status, following a rapid change in foreign policy under President Mikhail Saakashvili, and what NATO perceived as a demonstration of military readiness during the 2006 Kodori crisis.

== 2008 Bucharest Summit ==
During NATO's 2008 Bucharest summit in Bucharest, the United States and Poland called for Georgia to be allowed to join the Membership Action Plan (MAP). The alliance decided not to offer Georgia a MAP due to opposition from several countries, led by France and Germany, who feared the decision would anger Russia. Instead NATO countries assured the Georgian side in a special communiqué that they would eventually join the alliance once the requirements for membership were met. Members further pledged to review the decision in December 2008 at the meeting of NATO foreign ministers.

Responding on 11 April 2008 the head of the Russian military general Yuri Baluyevsky stated that if Georgia joins NATO, "Russia will take steps aimed at ensuring its interests along its borders and these will not only be military steps, but also steps of a different nature." The Ministry of Foreign Affairs of Georgia released a statement that said that it was "a demonstration of open aggression against Georgia" and called on the international community to react adequately to this "serious threat".

The NATO communiqué which promised the country eventual membership still angered Moscow. After the summit, Russian prime minister Vladimir Putin vowed support and protection to then-unrecognized republics of Abkhazia and South Ossetia, and even promising to open official Russian representations in the regions — a move which Georgia said violated international law and constituted a direct attack on a sovereign state. A Russian statement said, "Any attempts to apply political, economic or, all the more, military pressure on Abkhazia and South Ossetia are hopeless and counterproductive." After the 2008 South Ossetia war, Russia recognized Georgia's two breakaway regions, South Ossetia and Abkhazia, as independent countries.

== 2008 Georgia-Russia War ==
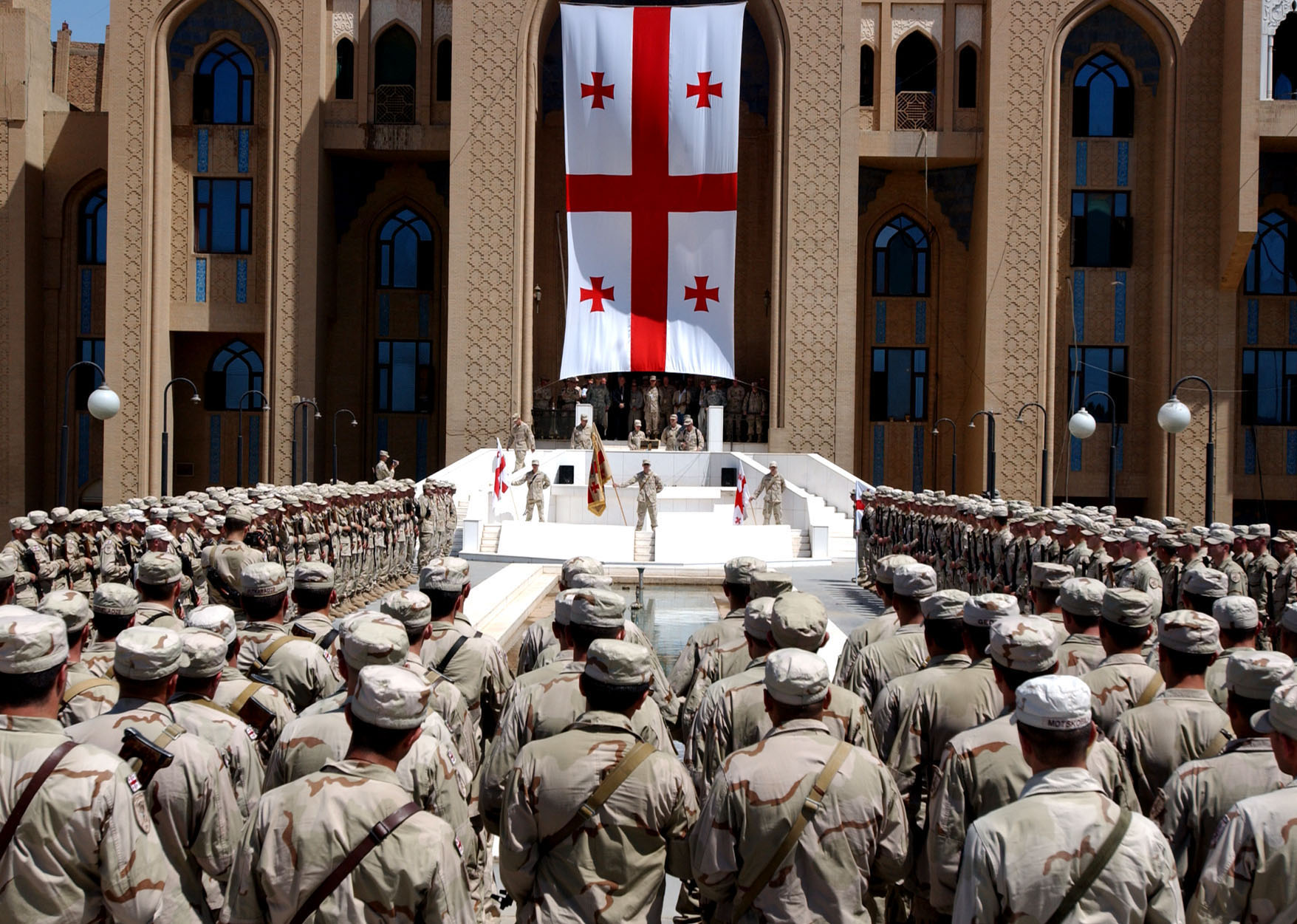
During the South Ossetia War, Georgia moved troops back from Iraq

On August 7, 2008, Georgia called for a unilateral ceasefire following days of exchanged gunfire between Georgian forces and South Ossetian separatists. Five and a half hours after Georgia's declared ceasefire, Georgia's Foreign Ministry sent troops into South Ossetia "to restore constitutional order in the entire region" The South Ossetian capital Tskhinvali became the site for a prolonged battle.

Russia responded with a larger assault that quickly moved beyond South Ossetia in Georgia and included the other breakaway region of Abkhazia. This ongoing dispute complicates NATO's relation with Russia, which has peacekeeping troops in both regions, internationally recognized as Georgian territory. The South Ossetia war further diminished the likelihood of Georgian accession to NATO in the near future according to several analysts. Others however see it as a justification for Georgian membership in NATO.

German chancellor Angela Merkel said during the meeting with Russian president after the signing of a ceasefire agreement that the 2008 promise NATO made to Georgia in Bucharest was still standing. However, she did not indicate a time frame, nor did she retract the earlier insistence of Germany and France that Georgia must resolve its internal problems prior to any NATO membership. As of November 2008, there is not a consensus within NATO on a Georgian Membership Action Plan.

== Post-war ==
NATO members In the process of accession Promised invitations Membership is not the goal Have not announced their membership intentions

On September 15, 2008 a Georgia–NATO Commission was established.

On April 4, 2009, the NATO heads of state released a joint statement after the Strasbourg–Kehl summit, pledging to maximise their advice, assistance and support for Georgia's and Ukraine's reform efforts. The statement reiterated that the two countries will become NATO members, but did not specify the time. It reaffirmed NATO's "continued support for the territorial integrity and sovereignty of Georgia within its internationally recognised borders". The statement said that Russia has not completely complied with its commitments undertaken under the August 12 and September 8 ceasefire accords and called for Moscow to reverse its recognition of Georgia's breakaway republics of Abkhazia and South Ossetia.

=== Under Fogh Rasmussen ===
On 21 November 2011, Russian president Dmitry Medvedev while addressing soldiers in Vladikavkaz near the Georgian border stated that the 2008 invasion had prevented any further NATO enlargement into the former Soviet sphere.

In May 2013, Georgian prime minister Bidzina Ivanishvili stated that his goal was to get a Membership Action Plan for his country from NATO in 2014. However, in June 2014 NATO officials announced that Georgia would not yet be invited to join the MAP process, but that NATO would implement a "substantive package" of cooperation measures with Georgia.

In 2014 prior to its 65th anniversary since its creation, NATO under Anders Fogh Rasmussen announced that it would not be offering any new countries membership into the organization that year. Analysts confirmed this as a sign that NATO members were becoming skeptical about further Eastern expansion due to worries about Russian retaliation to these new security guarantees so close to its borders.

In 2014 a bill was introduced to the US Congress to grant Major non-NATO ally status to Georgia, Moldova, and Ukraine.

=== Under Stoltenberg ===
In December 2017 during the US Presidency of Donald Trump, NATO Secretary General Jens Stoltenberg affirmed the support for Georgia's "eventual NATO membership".

In February 2019, in an interview with Voice of America Ben Hodges, a retired lieutenant-general of United States Army Europe and now working for the defence think tank Center for European Policy Analysis said that Georgia has "nothing left to prove about NATO membership" and "accession of West Germany into NATO is a precedent for Georgia".

In September 2019, Russian foreign minister Sergey Lavrov was quoted as saying that if NATO accepts Georgian membership with the article on collective defence covering only Tbilisi-administered territory (i.e., excluding the two Georgian territories Abkhazia and Tskhinvali (aka South Ossetia), both of which are currently occupied by Russia), "we will not start a war, but such conduct will undermine our relations with NATO and with countries who are eager to enter the alliance."

On 29 September 2020, Stoltenberg called on Georgia to use every opportunity to move closer to the Alliance and speed up preparations for membership. Stoltenberg stressed that earlier this year, the Allies agreed to further strengthen the NATO-Georgia partnership. According to him, NATO welcomes the progress made by Georgia in carrying out reforms, modernizing its armed forces and strengthening democracy. It is worth noting that so far Georgia's calls for membership in such formulations have not appeared in the rhetoric of the Secretary General of the Alliance. At the same time, NATO recognizes Georgia's aspirations for membership in the Alliance, as in the case of Ukraine.

At the end of November 2020, it became known that the NATO Summit in 2021 would consider a return to the "NATO open door policy", including the issue of providing Georgia with a Membership Action Plan (MAP).

On 17 February 2022, Georgian Defence Minister, Juansher Burchuladze, was quoted as saying that joining NATO is the only way to preserve Georgia's territorial integrity. This occurred following a meeting with Stoltenberg in Brussels. Georgian president Salome Zourabichvili, who took office in 2018, has conceded that NATO membership might not be possible while Russia occupies Georgian territory, and has sought to focus on European Union membership, which Georgia submitted its application for in May 2022.

On 19 June 2023, 45 opposition MPs signed a letter supporting Georgia's NATO membership, the letter also expressed solidarity for Ukraine. The letter was addressed to the NATO Liaison Office in Georgia.

== NATO-led missions involving Georgia ==
- Kosovo Force, 1999–2008;
- Operation Active Endeavour in the Mediterranean, 2010–2016;
- International Security Assistance Force in Afghanistan, 2004–2014;
- Resolute Support Mission in Afghanistan, 2015–2021;
- NATO Response Force, 2015–present.

== Georgia's foreign relations with NATO member states ==
- Albania
- Belgium
- Bulgaria
- Canada
- Croatia
- Czech Republic
- Denmark
- Estonia
- Finland
- France
- Germany
- Greece
- Hungary
- Iceland
- Italy
- Latvia
- Lithuania
- Luxembourg
- Montenegro
- Netherlands
- North Macedonia
- Norway
- Poland
- Portugal
- Romania
- Slovakia
- Slovenia
- Spain
- Sweden
- Turkey
- United Kingdom
- United States

== See also ==
- Foreign relations of Georgia
- Foreign relations of NATO
- Enlargement of NATO
- Individual Partnership Action Plan
- NATO open door policy
- Partnership for Peace
- Accession of Georgia to the EU
- Georgia–EU relations
- Armenia–NATO relations
- Azerbaijan–NATO relations
- Belarus–NATO relations
- Moldova–NATO relations
- Russia–NATO relations
- Ukraine–NATO relations
- State Ministry for Euro-Atlantic Integration of Georgia
- Russo-Georgian War
- Austria–NATO relations
- Cyprus–NATO relations
- Ireland–NATO relations
- Malta–NATO relations
- Serbia–NATO relations
- Switzerland–NATO relations
