= Georgia–North Macedonia relations =

- North Macedonia: Georgia

Georgia–North Macedonia relations refers to the bilateral relations between the Georgia and North Macedonia. Georgia has a non resident ambassador in Sofia. Both countries are full members of the Organization of the Black Sea Economic Cooperation and Council of Europe.

On February 16, 2019, during the Munich Security Conference, the foreign ministers of North Macedonia and Georgia signed a protocol for establishing formal diplomatic relations between the two countries. One year prior, the Speakers of Parliament of both countries, Talat Xhaferi and Irakli Kobakhidze met at the Inter-Parliamentary Union in Geneva, where Irakli Kobakhidze stressed the importance of establishing bilateral relations between Georgia and North Macedonia, as the two countries faced similar objectives and challenges, such as the integration into NATO and the European Union.

According to the Greek newspaper Eleftherotypia, Georgia had planned to recognise North Macedonia under its former constitutional name, the Republic of Macedonia, in 2010. However, the Greek diplomacy threatened Georgia with a veto that would obstruct their NATO accession, as well as their access to EU financial aid, if Georgia decided to do so. These claims have later been refuted by the Ministry of Foreign Affairs of North Macedonia.

== See also ==
- Foreign relations of Georgia
- Foreign relations of North Macedonia
- Georgia-NATO relations
- Accession of North Macedonia to the EU
- Accession of Georgia to the EU
