= Georgia–Japan relations =

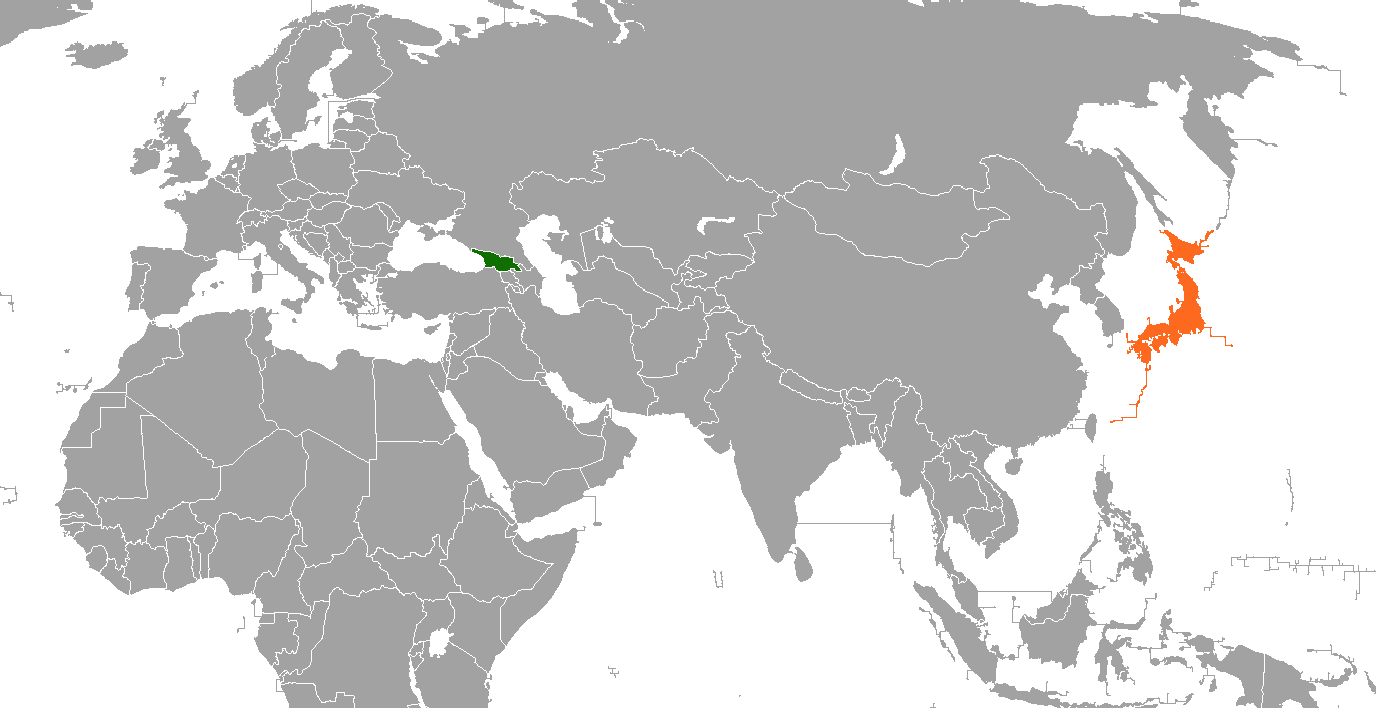
- Georgia: Japan

Georgia–Japan relations were established on August 3, 1992, just over one year since Georgia became independent from the Soviet Union. Since November 2006, Georgia has maintained an embassy in Tokyo. Japan has an embassy in Tbilisi.

== History ==
During the Russo-Japanese War (1904–1905), when Georgia was part of the Russian Empire, the Georgian national movement celebrated Japan's victory through allegorical poetry designed to evade Russian censorship. Writers employed imagery such as "spring" and the "sun" to symbolize the rise of Japan as a new power on the world stage. In April 1905, the Georgian writer Akaki Tsereteli published the poem Gurian Nana in the newspaper Iveria. Presented as a lullaby dedicated to a newborn child, the poem ends each stanza with the phrase "Oi amas venatsvale" ("I cherish this one" or "God bless this one"). However, the phrase "Oi amas" ("this one") also phonetically echoes the name of Ōyama Iwao, the Japanese commander, allowing the poem to covertly praise and glorify him. The motif of the newborn child further serves as an allegory for Japan itself — a young and rising power on the world stage.

Between 1918 and 1921, Japan was one of many countries that de jure recognized the independence of the Democratic Republic of Georgia.

== Economy and foreign aid ==
Japan has extended foreign aid to Georgia for various economic and cultural development projects. The balance of trade between the two nations is heavily in favor of Japan, with Japan exporting automobiles and manufactured goods, and Georgia exporting food products and chemicals.

== Military cooperation ==
In February 2011 Georgian Deputy Foreign Minister Nikoloz Vashakidze met with Director-General for International Affairs, Bureau of Defense Policy of the Japanese Defense Ministry Hiroshi Oe and discussed further prospects of military cooperation between Georgia and Japan during the meeting.

== Japan's official statement on Abkhazia and South Ossetia ==
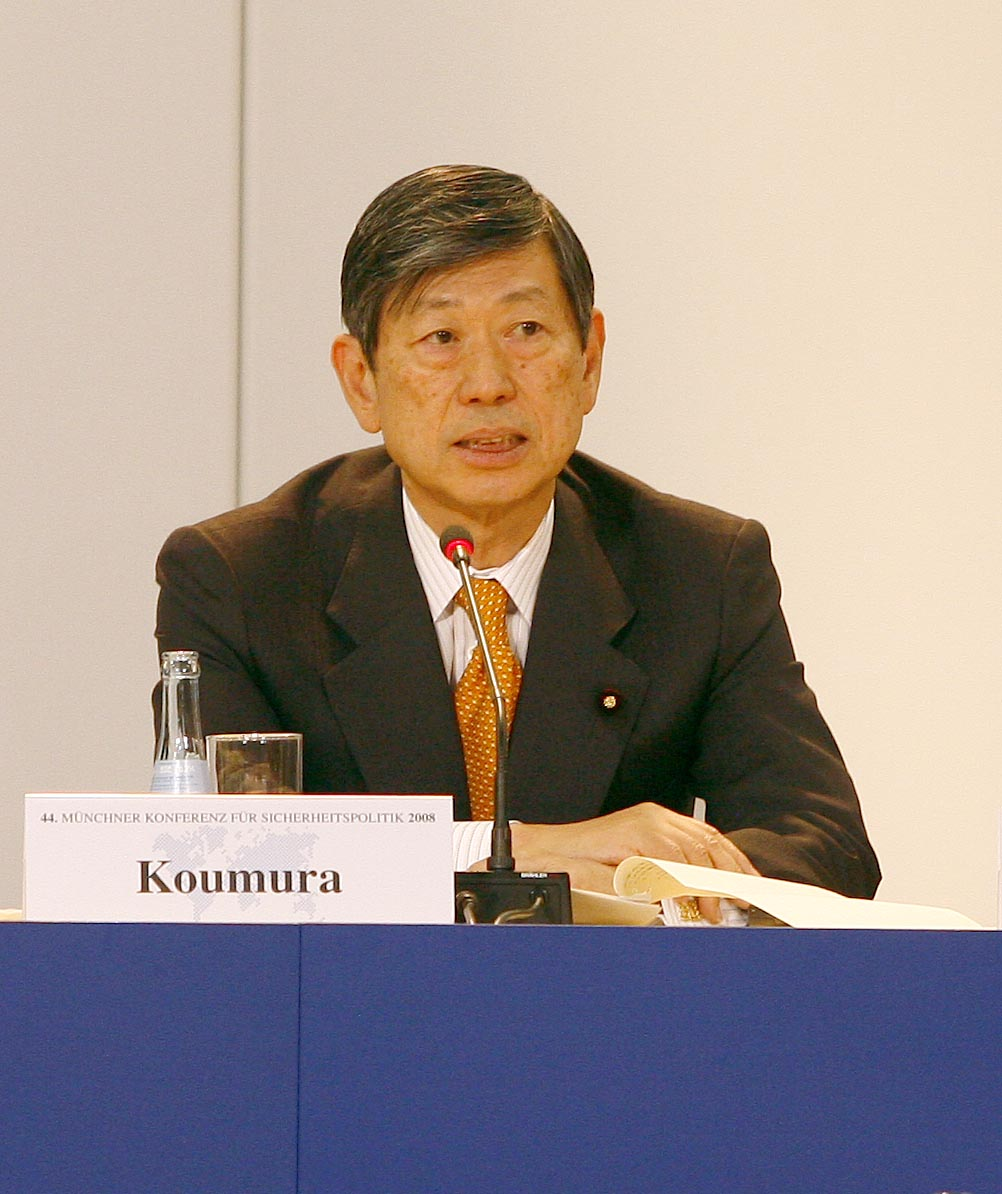
Japanese FM Masahiko Koumura, who expressed Japan's full support for the sovereignty and territorial integrity of Georgia in August 2008.

Japan supports Georgia's territorial claims over Abkhazia and South Ossetia. On August 27, 2008, Masahiko Koumura Minister for Foreign Affairs of Japan issued the official statement entirely supporting Georgia's territorial integrity, which was followed by the formal recognition of the proclaimed republics by Russia on the previous day.

According to the October 2014 Joint Statement between Japan and Georgia on "Solidarity for Peace and Democracy": "Both sides shared the view that peaceful resolution to the conflict in Georgia's occupied regions of Abkhazia and Tskhinvali region/South Ossetia in line with the principles of sovereignty and territorial integrity of Georgia within its internationally recognized borders are essential for the peace and stability of the country and the entire South Caucasus region". Japan's position on "Georgia's occupied regions of Tskhinvali region/South Ossetia and Abkhazia" was reaffirmed in the 1 March 2017 statement by the Embassy of Japan in Georgia.

On March 29, 2022, during the Russo-Ukrainian War, the Embassy of Japan again issued an official statement to support the sovereignty and territorial integrity of Georgia and to deny the so-called "parliamentary elections" in Abkhazia held twice on that month.

== High level visits ==
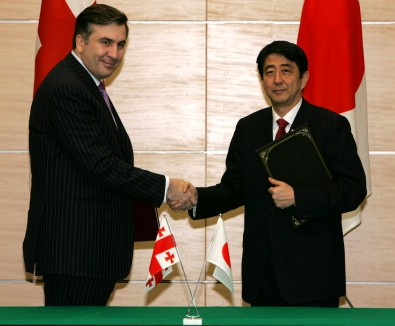
Georgian President Mikheil Saakashvili (left) and Japanese PM Shinzō Abe at the PM's Official Residence in Tokyo on March 8, 2007.

Georgian President Eduard Shevardnadze made an official visit to Japan in March 1999 and President Mikheil Saakashvili visited Japan in March 2007.

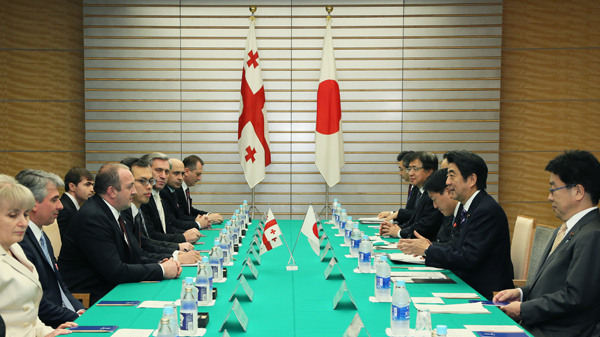
2014 Georgia–Japan summit

In October 2014, Georgian President Giorgi Margvelashvili made a working visit to Tokyo, where Prime Minister Shinzo Abe mentioned to Margvelashvili that Georgia shared the same fundamental values with Japan and both leaders issued Joint Statement fully supporting the territorial integrity of Georgia, strengthening of economic relations between both countries, and other overall development objectives.

== Diplomatic mission ==
=== Georgian Ambassadors to Japan ===
David Nozadze (chargé d'affaires, 2006-2008)

1. Ivane Machavariani (2008-2009)
2. Revaz Beshidze (2010-2013)
3. Levan Tsintsadze (2014-?)
4. Teimuraz Lezhava (2021-)

=== Japanese Ambassadors to Georgia ===
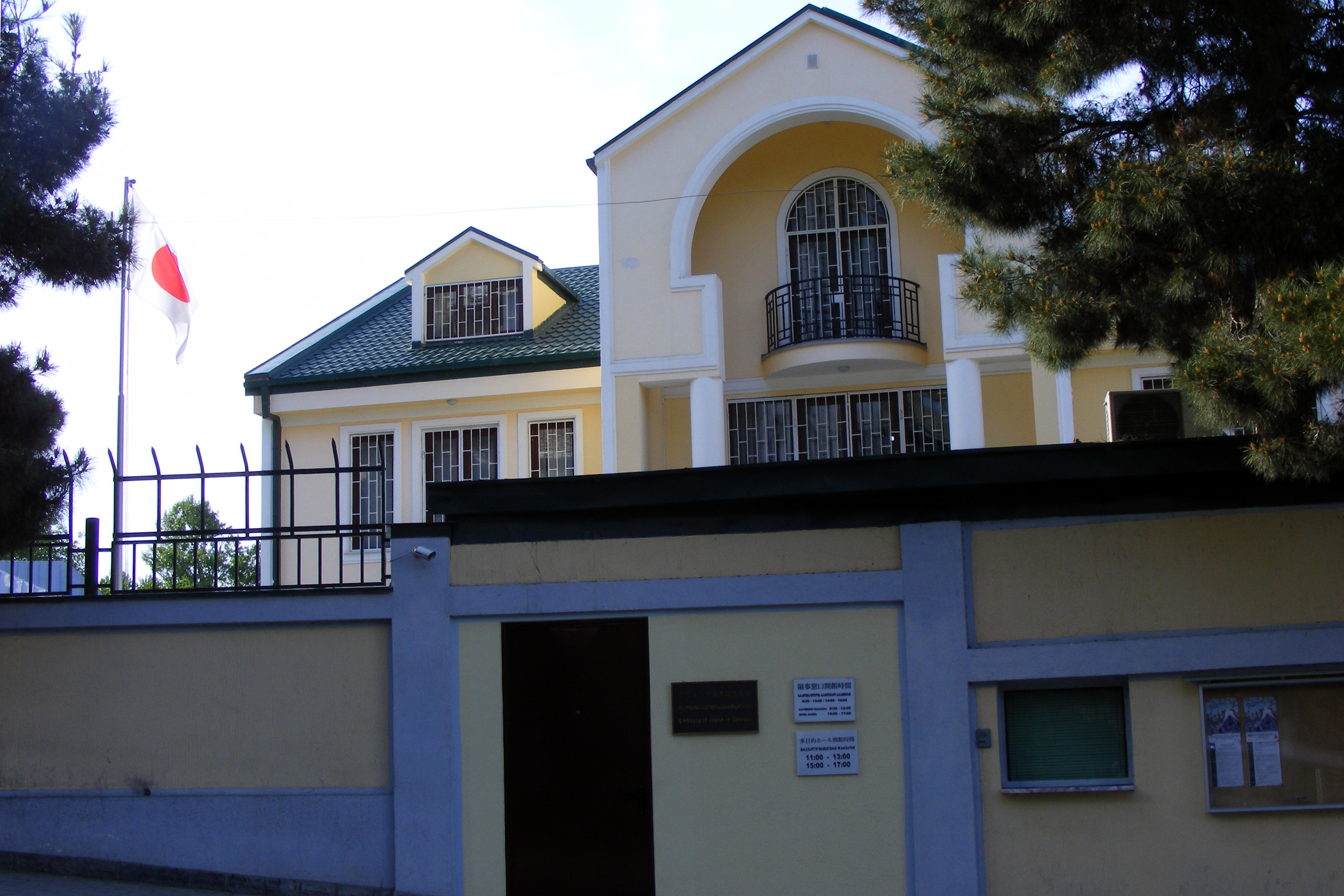
Embassy of Japan in Tbilisi (April 2012)

1. Sumio Edamura (in Moscow, 1992–1994)
2. Koji Watanabe (in Moscow, 1994–1996)
3. Takehiro Togo (in Moscow, 1996–1999)
4. Minoru Tamba (in Moscow, 1999–2000)
5. Tetsuya Hirose (in Baku, 2000–2002)
6. Toshiyuki Fujiwara (in Baku, 2002–2004)
7. Tadahiro Abe (in Baku, 2004–2007)
8. Masamitsu Oki (in Baku, 2007–2009)
9. Masayoshi Kamohara (2009-2012)
10. Toshio Kaitani (2013-2017)
11. Tadaharu Uehara (2017-)

== Resident diplomatic missions ==
- Georgia has an embassy in Tokyo.
- Japan has an embassy in Tbilisi.

== See also ==
- Foreign relations of Georgia
- Foreign relations of Japan
