= Georgia–Italy relations =

- Georgia: Italy

Georgia–Italy relations are foreign relations between Georgia and Italy. Both countries established diplomatic relations on 11 May 1992. Georgia has an embassy in Rome. Italy has an embassy in Tbilisi. Both countries are full members of the Council of Europe.

During the 2008 South Ossetia war, the Italian Minister of Foreign Affairs Franco Frattini said "We cannot create an anti-Russia coalition in Europe, and on this point we are close to Putin's position" he also stressed that Prime Minister of Italy Silvio Berlusconi was a close ally of Prime Minister Vladimir Putin of Russia. On 8 August, the Italian Government issued a statement reporting that "In close coordination with its European Union and Atlantic partners, the Italian Government is following the crisis situation that has developed in South Ossetia with grave concern" and that "Italy calls on all parties to bring an immediate end to the violence and reach a lasting cessation of hostilities. It strongly encourages a resumption of negotiations for a political solution to the problem with due respect for Georgia’s sovereignty and territorial integrity". Later, on 10 August, after contacts with the US Secretary of State, the French Foreign Minister and the Finnish Minister for Foreign Affairs, the Italian Minister of Foreign Affairs reiterated this invitation. In an 11 August interview with the La Stampa newspaper, the Italian Foreign Ministry reported about the direct involvement of Silvio Berlusconi, Prime Minister of Italy: "Sarkozy phoned Putin in his capacity as current President of the European Union, and 10 minutes later he phoned Berlusconi. ‘Silvio, you speak to Vladimir too’, he said, ‘explain that we’re not anti-Russian and we all want Moscow to be close to the EU’. In his conversation with Berlusconi, Putin reiterated his position: that Russia had every right to intervene in Georgia”, and made a reference about an eventual deployment of Italian troops: "If, after his meetings in Tbilisi and Moscow, Kouchner submits a proposal to the European Council of Foreign Ministers on Wednesday, and it’s approved, we’ll take it into consideration. There are a lot of ‘ifs’, and we'd need in any case to redistribute our forces, which are finite, by redeploying them from other international missions. Humanitarian aid for South Ossetia, on the other hand, is ready as of now".

== Resident diplomatic missions ==
- Georgia has an embassy in Rome.
- Italy has an embassy in Tbilisi.

== See also ==
- Foreign relations of Georgia
- Foreign relations of Italy
- Georgia-NATO relations
- Georgia-EU relations
  - Accession of Georgia to the EU
