= Georgia–Kyrgyzstan relations =

- Georgia: Kyrgyzstan

Before 1918, both Kyrgyzstan and Georgia were part of the Russian Empire and both were part of the USSR until 1991. Georgia is represented in Kyrgyzstan by its embassy in Astana. Kyrgyzstan is represented in Georgia by its embassy in Baku. Both countries are full members of the Organization for Security and Co-operation in Europe.

== History ==
Both countries established diplomatic relations on 10 July 1992. In 2005, during the Tulip Revolution, Georgian President Mikheil Saakashvili sent a letter to President Askar Akayev offering to mediate between him and the opposition to prevent violence. Akayev ultimately rejected the offer.

== High-level mutual state visits ==
| Guest | Host | Place of visit | Date of visit |
|---|---|---|---|
| (Kyrgyzstan) President Askar Akayev | (Georgia (country)) President Eduard Shevardnadze | Tbilisi | 21-24 April 1997 |
| (Georgia (country)) President Mikheil Saakashvili | (Kyrgyzstan) President Roza Otunbayeva (Kyrgyzstan) President-elect Almazbek Atambayev | Bishkek | November 30-December 2, 2011 |
| (Kyrgyzstan) President Almazbek Atambayev | (Georgia (country)) President Giorgi Margvelashvili | Tbilisi | October 12–13, 2016 |
| (Georgia (country)) Prime Minister Irakli Kobakhidze | (Kyrgyzstan) President Sadyr Japarov | Bishkek | June 11-12, 2026 |

== Cooperation ==
During an official visit to Kyrgyzstan in June 2026, Georgian First Deputy Minister of Education, Levan Ghirsiashvili, and Kyrgyz Deputy Minister Albert Makhmetkulov signed a memorandum to enhance educational cooperation. The agreement focuses on sharing experiences, implementing joint projects, and establishing exchange programs for students, teachers, and researchers to strengthen partnerships between educational institutions in both countries.

In 2026, Kyrgyzstan was Georgia's largest trading partner.

== See also ==
- Foreign relations of Georgia
- Foreign relations of Kyrgyzstan
