= Brazil–Georgia relations =

- Brazil: Georgia

Brazil–Georgia relations are the international relations between Brazil and Georgia. Both nations are members of the United Nations.

== History ==
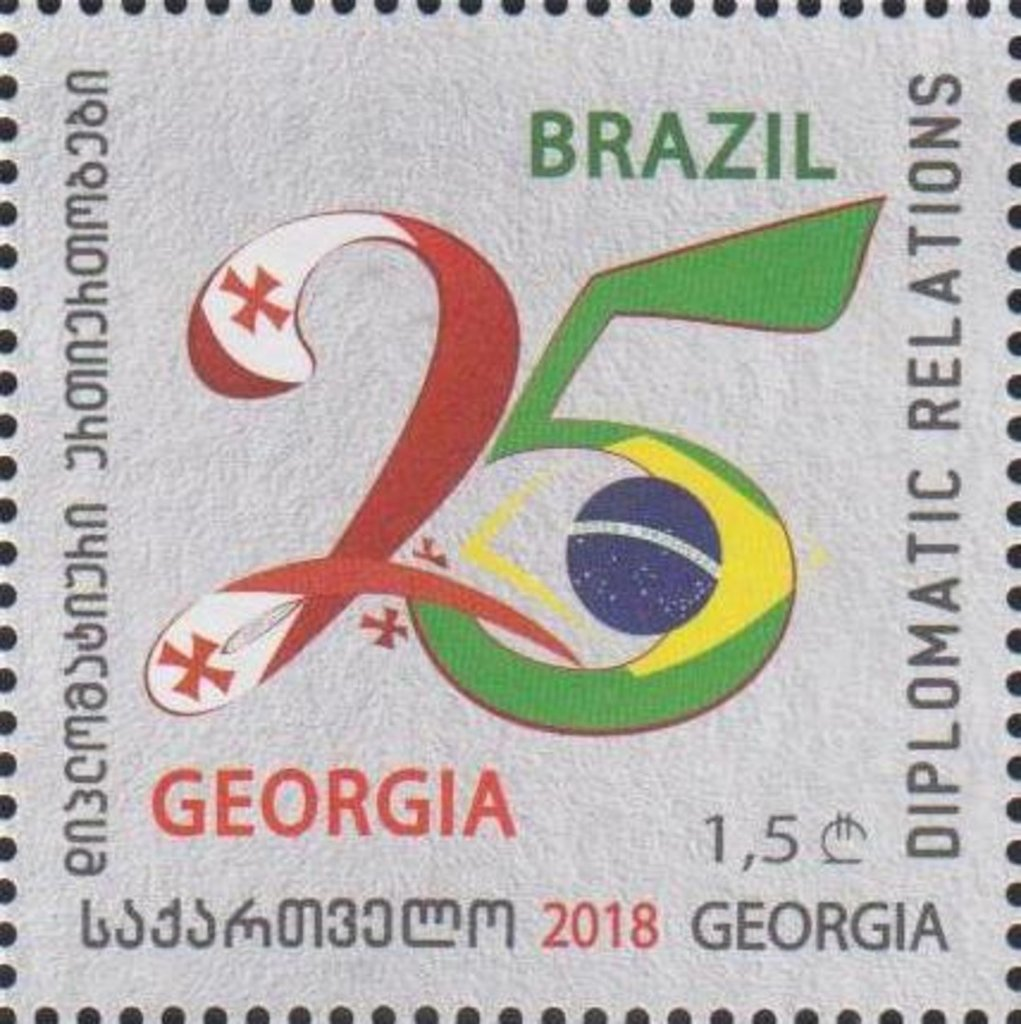
Georgian commemorative stamp from 2018 celebrating the 25th anniversary of diplomatic relations with Brazil

In 1991, Brazil recognized Georgia's independence soon after the dissolution of the Soviet Union. Diplomatic relations between both nations were established in April 1993. In July 2010, the Georgian embassy in Brasília was opened. Brazil opened a resident embassy in Tbilisi in June 2011.

In 2008, during the Russo-Georgian War; Brazil remained neutral and asked for both sides to seek peace. Brazil has not recognized the independence of Abkhazia nor South Ossetia and sees them as integral parts of Georgia.

In August 2011, Georgian Foreign Minister, Grigol Vashadze, paid a visit to Brazil. In April 2012, Georgian Prime Minister, Nika Gilauri, paid an official visit to Brazil, the first by a Georgian head-of-government. In 2017, Brazilian Foreign Minister, Aloysio Nunes, traveled to Tbilisi. This was the first trip by a Brazilian Foreign Minister to Georgia, and it was a visit to strengthen the economic-commercial relationship between the two countries, as well as to increase possibilities for cooperation in other areas, such as tax, customs, tourism and defense.

== High-level visits ==
High-level visits from Brazil to Georgia

- Foreign Minister Aloysio Nunes (2017)
- Minister of Justice Torquato Jardim (2018)

High-level visits from Georgia to Brazil

- Foreign Minister Grigol Vashadze (2011)
- Prime Minister Nika Gilauri (2012)
- Foreign Minister Maia Panjikidze (2013)
- President Giorgi Margvelashvili (2016)

== Bilateral agreements ==
Both nations have signed a few bilateral agreements such as a Memorandum of Understanding between the Ministry of Foreign Affairs Brazil and the Ministry of Foreign Affairs of Georgia on Political Consultations (2011); Agreement on Visa exemptions for holders of diplomatic, official and service passports (2011); Memorandum of Understanding on Economic, Scientific and Technical Cooperation in Agro-Industry (2011) and a Memorandum on Economic Cooperation (2012).

== Resident diplomatic missions ==
Of Brazil

- Tbilisi (Embassy)

Of Georgia

- Brasília (Embassy)

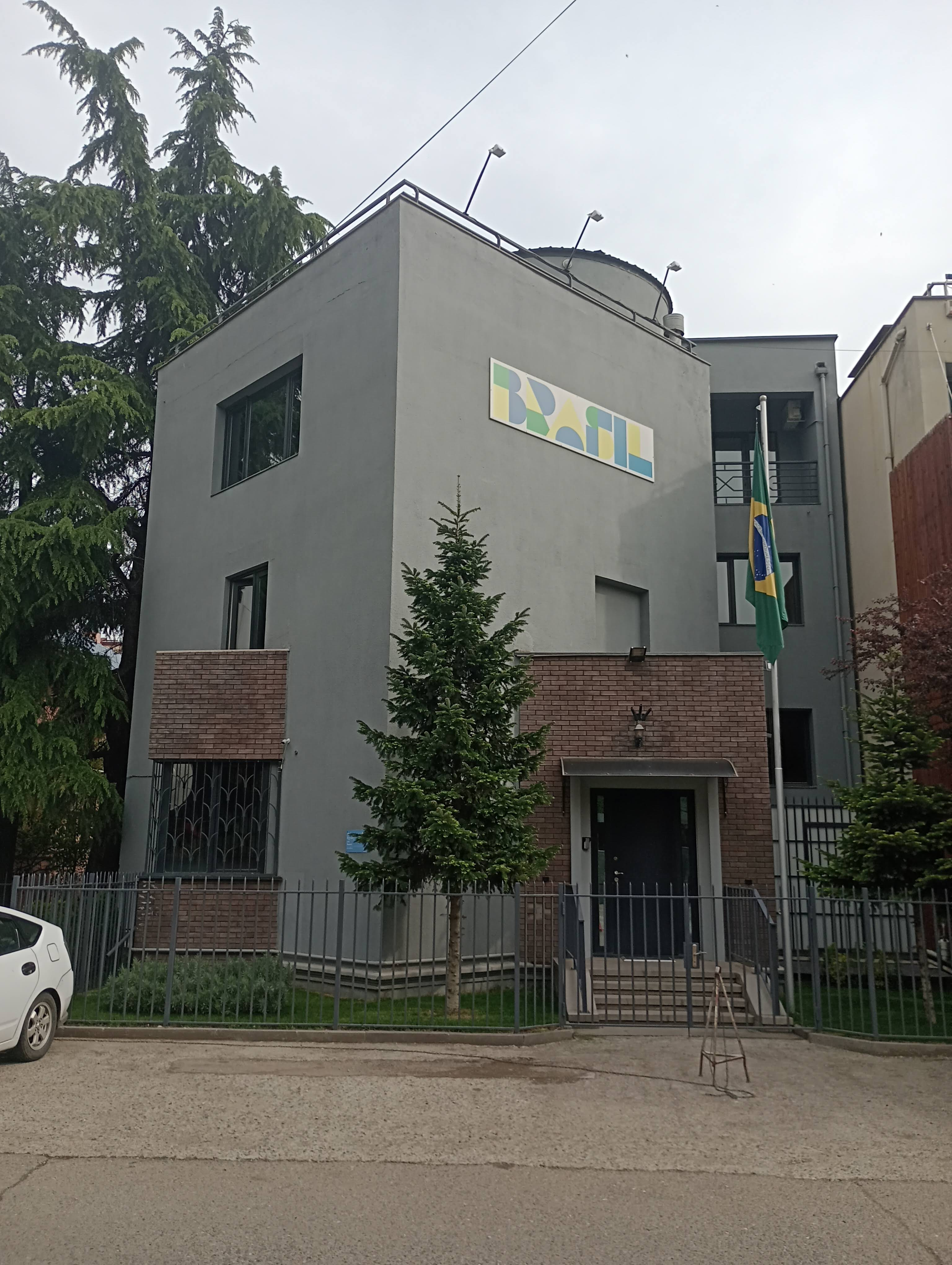
Embassy of Brazil in Tbilisi

== See also ==
- Foreign relations of Brazil
- Foreign relations of Georgia
