= Canada–Georgia relations =

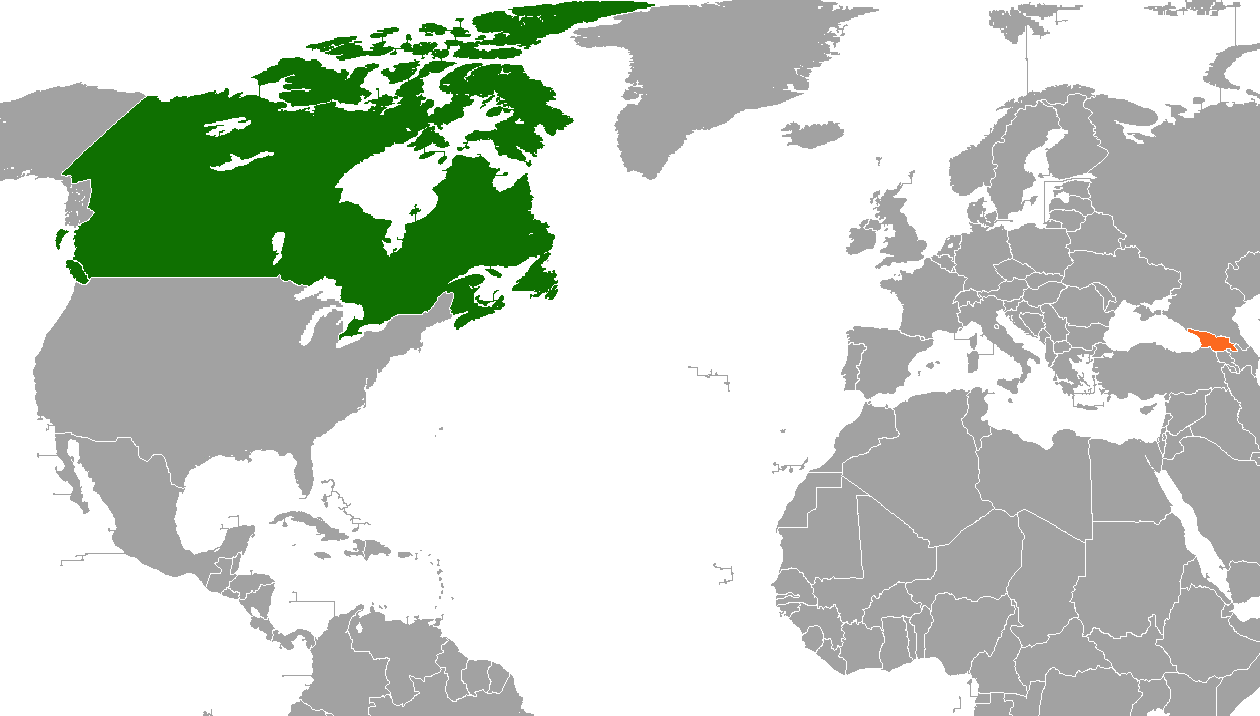

- Canada: Georgia

Canada and Georgia established diplomatic relations in 1991. Both nations are members of the United Nations.

The Georgian community in Canada is a total of 3,155 based on the Canadian Census 2011, having an increase compared to the 2006 Census. Most Georgian-Canadians reside in larger metropolitan areas across the country.

== History ==
During World War II, in 1945, Canadian soldiers were sent to the Dutch island of Texel to negotiate the end of the Georgian uprising on Texel against the Germans.

Canada recognized Georgia soon after its separation from the Soviet Union in 1991. In July 1992, Canada and Georgia formally established diplomatic relations. Since establishing diplomatic relations; relations between both nations have gradually been increasing.

In 2008 during the Russo-Georgian War, Canada strongly supported the territorial integrity and sovereignty of Georgia and its democratically elected government. Furthermore, Canada has not recognized the independence of Abkhazia and South Ossetia and continues to view them as integral parts of Georgia.

In 2011, Georgia opened a resident embassy in Ottawa. That same year, Canada opened an honorary consulate in Tbilisi. The Canadian government has committed to humanitarian assistance and a joint funding project with the United States, establishing and expanding the Explosive Remnants of War Coordination Center in Georgia. Georgia has received endorsement from Canada for eventual membership in NATO.

In October 2011, both nations signed a memorandum of understanding to further promote economic relations.

== Trade ==
In 2019, trade between Canada and Georgia totaled CAD$39 million. Canada's main exports to Georgia include vehicles and equipment, machinery, animal-based products, and chemical based products. Georgia's main exports to Canada include food products, textiles, metals, and vehicles.

== Resident diplomatic missions ==
Honorary Consulate of Canada in Tbilisi
- Location: Tbilisi
- Address: Merab Kostava street #70, third floor, 0171
- Ambassador: Clifford Isaak

Embassy of Georgia in Ottawa
- Location: Constitution Square, Ottawa
- Address: 340 Albert St Suite 940 K1R 7Y6

- Canada is accredited to Georgia from its embassy in Ankara, Turkey and maintains an honorary consulate in Tbilisi.
- Georgia maintains an embassy in Ottawa.

== See also ==
- Foreign relations of Canada
- Foreign relations of Georgia
- Georgia-NATO relations
- Georgian Canadians
