= Bulgaria–Georgia relations =

- Bulgaria: Georgia

Diplomatic mission
- Embassy of Bulgaria, Tbilisi: Embassy of Georgia, Sofia

Bulgaria–Georgia relations are foreign relations between Bulgaria and Georgia. Bulgaria recognized the independence of Georgia on January 15, 1992. Diplomatic relations between both countries were established on June 5, 1992. Bulgaria has an embassy in Tbilisi and Georgia has an embassy in Sofia. Both countries are full members of the BSCE and COE. Bulgaria is a member of the EU, which Georgia applied for in 2022.

== Resident diplomatic missions ==
- Bulgaria has an embassy in Tbilisi.
- Georgia has an embassy in Sofia.
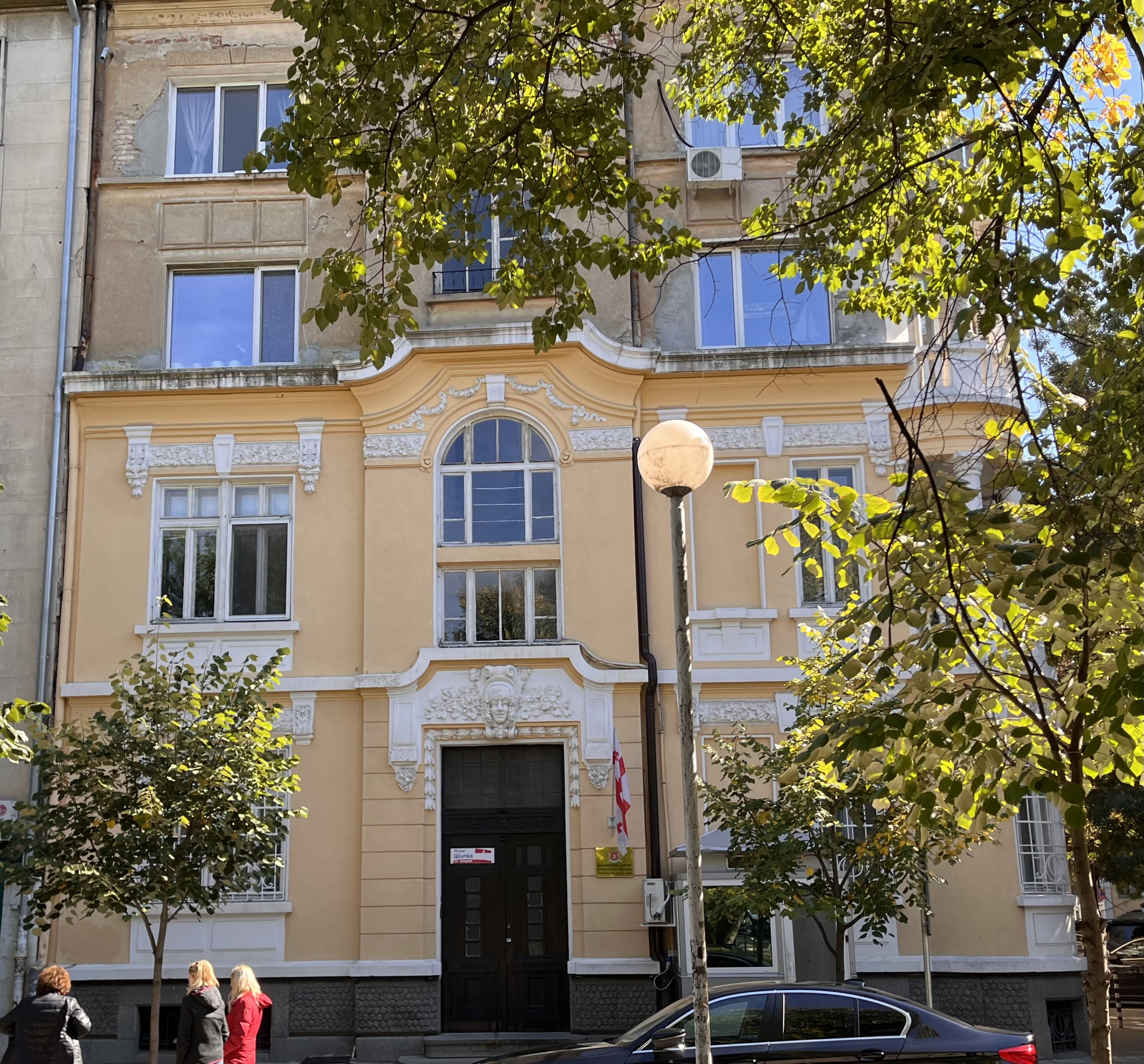
Embassy of Georgia in Sofia

== See also ==
- Foreign relations of Bulgaria
- Foreign relations of Georgia
- Georgia-NATO relations
- Georgia-EU relations
  - Accession of Georgia to the EU
