= Georgia–Iraq relations =

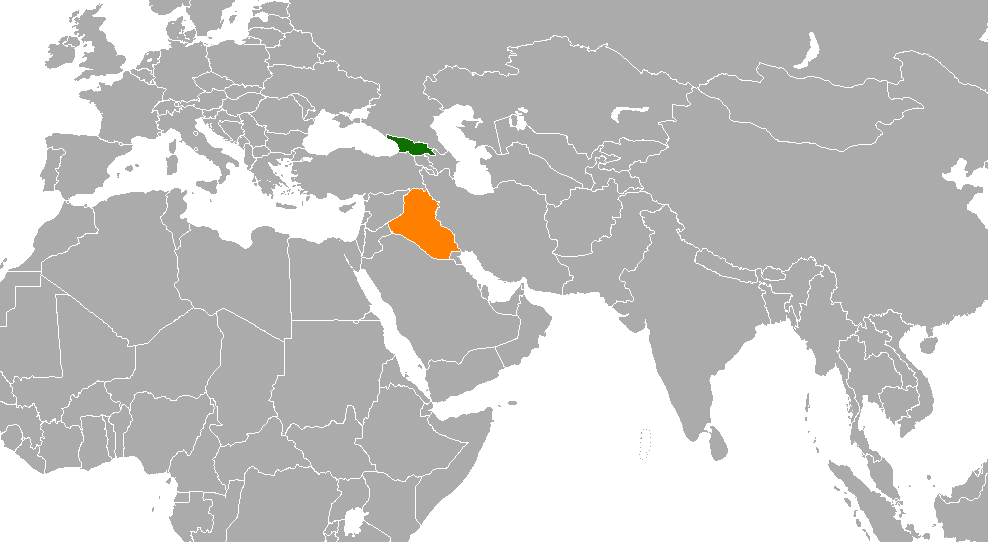
- Georgia: Iraq

Georgia–Iraq relations refers to the bilateral relations of the Republic of Georgia and the Republic of Iraq. Georgia does not have an embassy in Baghdad, but Iraq does have an embassy in Tbilisi, the Georgian capitol.

== Role of Georgia in the Iraq War ==
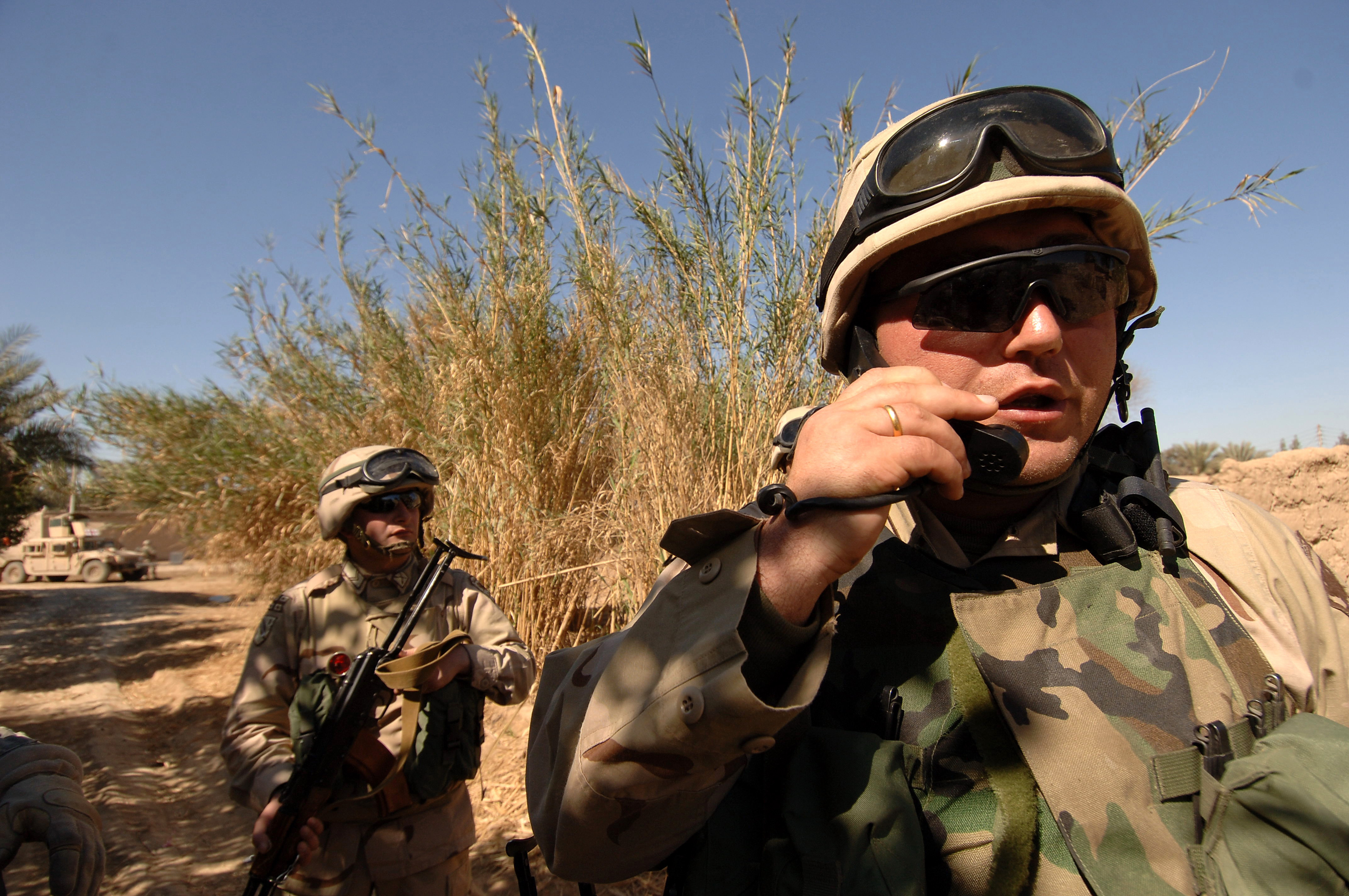
Georgian soldiers from the 13th Light Infantry Battalion on a clearing mission in Al Shaheen, Iraq, in March 2007.

Georgia joined the Iraq War as part of the United States-led coalition in August 2003. By 2008, Georgia had deployed 2,300 troops in Iraq, becoming the third largest contributor to the coalition forces in the Iraq War. In addition, the country provided a battalion of approximately 550 troops to the United Nations Assistance Mission in Iraq. During the Russia–Georgia war in August 2008, Georgia recalled all of its forces from Iraq. The U.S. Air Force provided logistical support for the withdrawal. On August 10–11, 2008, 16 C-17 Globemasters shuttled around 2,000 Georgian soldiers and supplies back to Georgia, drawing a sharp protest from Russia. The U.S. officials responded that the assistance to the Georgian redeployment to Georgia was part of a prior agreement that transport would be provided in case of an emergency and that the Russians had been informed about the flights in advance. In total, Georgia suffered three combat fatalities (all in 2008) and at least 19 servicemen were injured in Iraq. In addition, one Georgian serviceman died in a car accident and one committed suicide, both in 2007.

== Increasing cooperation ==
An air route was opened between Georgia and Iraq in 2013, with Iraqi Airways reportedly making two flights a week to Tbilisi. Later that year, the Iraqi ambassador in Tbilisi met with the Georgian foreign affairs minister, where the two discussed increasing cooperation and ties between the two countries. The Georgian foreign minister wished Iraq stability and progress.

== See also ==
- Foreign relations of Georgia
- Foreign relations of Iraq
