= Georgia–Mexico relations =

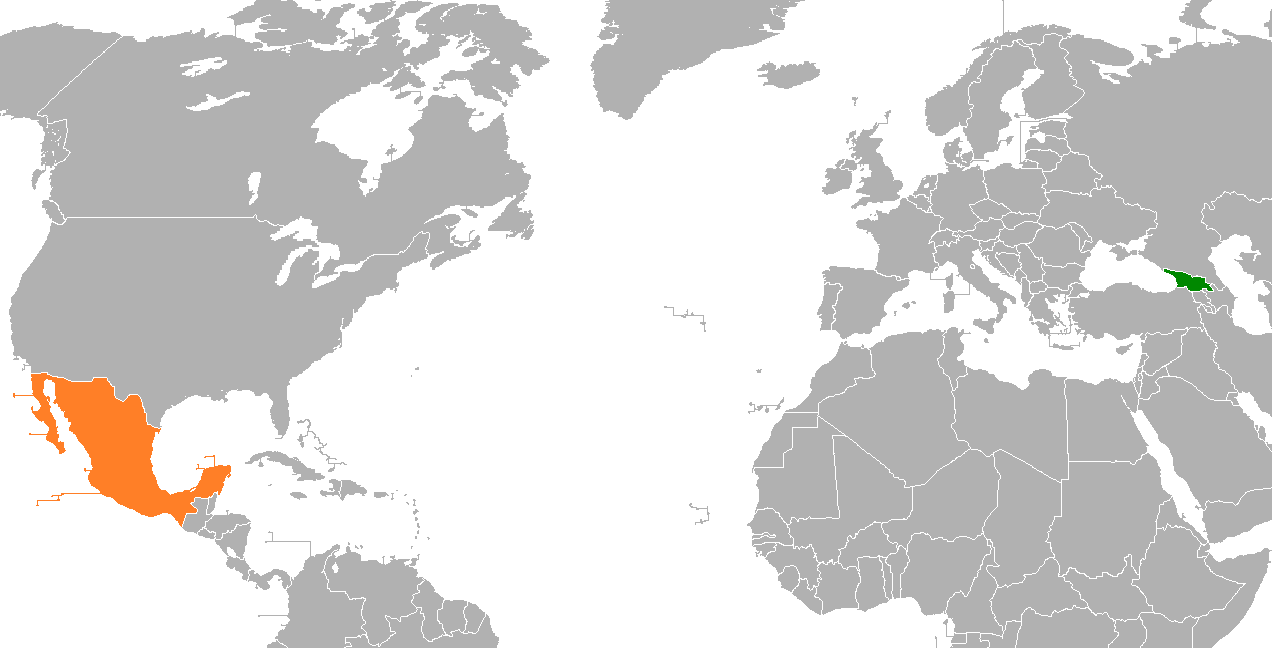

- Georgia: Mexico

The nations of Georgia and Mexico established diplomatic relations in 1992. Both nations are members of the United Nations and the World Trade Organization.

== History ==
Diplomatic relations between Georgia and Mexico were established on 8 June 1992 soon after the dissolution of the Soviet Union. Soon after independence, both nations accredited ambassadors to each other via-third nations. Since the establishment of diplomatic relations, official relations between both nations have been limited.

In 2008, during the Russo-Georgian War; Mexico remained neutral and asked for both sides to seek peace. Mexico has not recognized the independence of Abkhazia nor South Ossetia. In September 2010, Georgian Prime Minister Nika Gilauri attended the bicentennial of Mexican Independence. Later that year in December 2010, Georgian President Mikheil Saakashvili attended the UN Conference on Climate Change (COP16) held in Cancún and where he met with President Felipe Calderón.

In August 2011, Georgian Foreign Minister Grigol Vashadze paid a visit to Mexico and announced the opening of a Georgian embassy in the country. The embassy was opened later that year in Mexico City. In July 2016, a Mexican Delegation of the Foreign Relations Committee, led by Senator Gabriela Cuevas Barron, paid a visit to Georgia.

In 2022, both nations celebrated 30 years of diplomatic relations.

== High-level visits ==
High-level visits from Georgia to Mexico

- Prime Minister Nika Gilauri (2010)
- President Mikheil Saakashvili (2010)
- Foreign Minister Grigol Vashadze (2011)

High-level visits from Mexico to Georgia

- Senator Gabriela Cuevas Barron (2016)

== Bilateral agreement ==
Both nations have agreed on a Memorandum of Understanding for the Establishment of Political Consultations on Issues of Mutual Interests, and an Agreement in Educational and Cultural Cooperation (2022).

== Trade ==
In 2023, two-way trade between both nations amounted to US$15.7 million. Georgia's main exports to Mexico include: chemical based products, electronic integrated circuits, electronic wires and cables, clothing, nuts, and parts and accessories for motor vehicles. Mexico's main exports to Georgia include: alcohol, motor vehicles, tubes and pipes from iron or steel, mechanical appliances, dried vegetables, and fish.

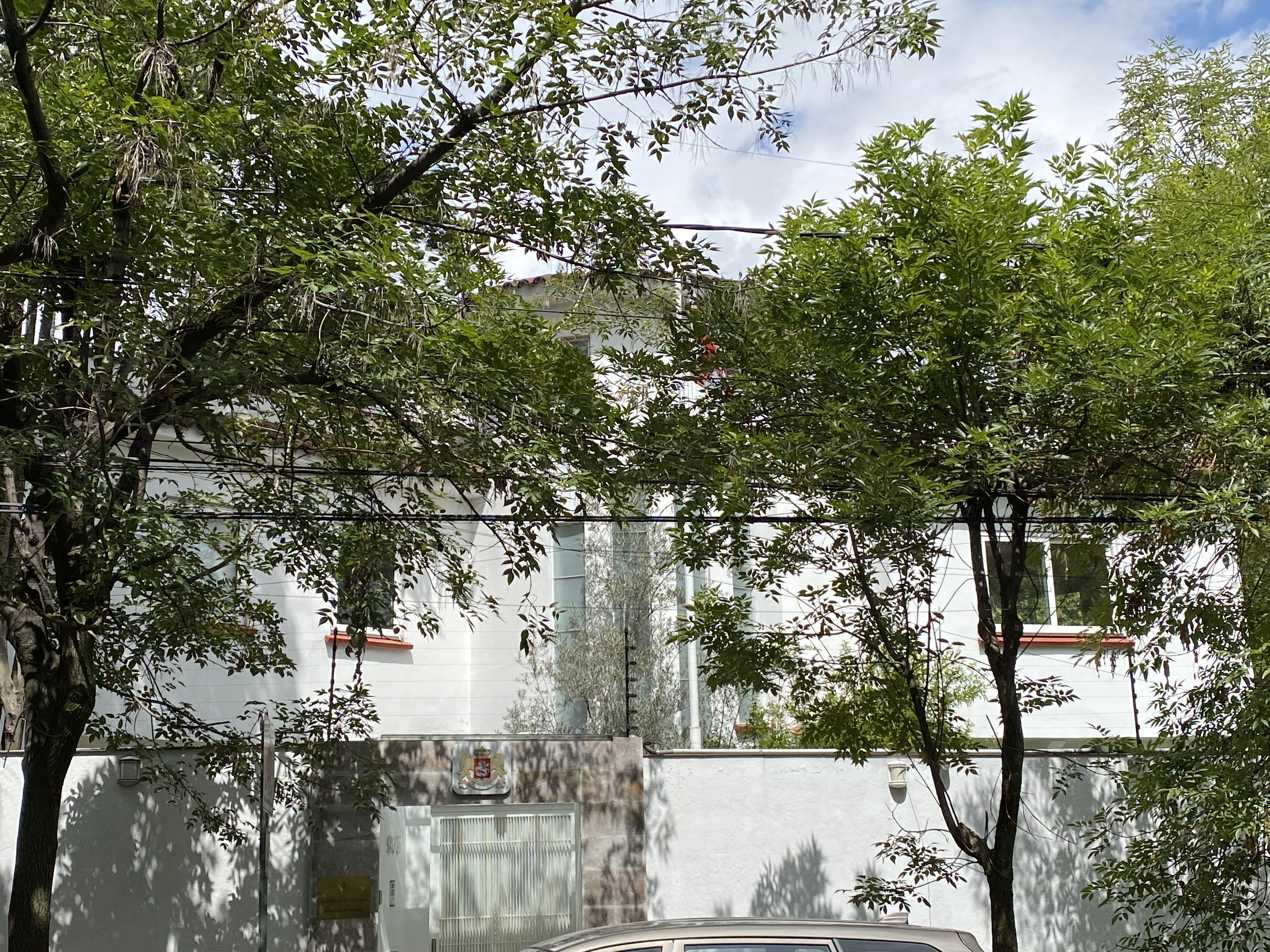
Embassy of Georgia in Mexico City

== Resident diplomatic missions ==
- Georgia has an embassy in Mexico City.
- Mexico is accredited to Georgia from its embassy in Ankara, Turkey and maintains an honorary consulate in Tbilisi.

== See also ==
- Foreign relations of Georgia
- Foreign relations of Mexico
