= Belarus–Georgia relations =

- Belarus: Georgia

Before 1918, both Belarus and Georgia were part of the Russian Empire and both were part of the USSR until 1991. Both countries established diplomatic relations in 1992.

Belarus has an embassy in Tbilisi. Georgia has an embassy in Minsk.

== History ==
In 2006, there was a deterioration in relations between states. The leadership of the Republic of Belarus accused a group of Georgian deputies of trying to organize a color revolution in order to overthrow Alexander Lukashenko. The President of Belarus Alexander Lukashenko stated in 2007 when meeting with Interior Minister of Georgia Ivane Merabishvili that "Belarus is determined to restore and boost relations with Georgia".

=== Recent tensions ===
On 28 September 2022 President of Belarus, Alexander Lukashenko visited Georgian breakaway territory Abkhazia and there he had meetings with de facto leader Aslan Bzhania and other senior officials. "I strongly condemn Aleksandr Lukashenka’s visit to occupied Abkhazia," President Salome Zourabichvili wrote on Twitter. "This is an unacceptable violation of Georgia’s Law on Occupied Territories and of the principles of our bilateral relations and international law." The Ministry called on Belarus to respect the sovereignty and territorial integrity of Georgia and "not to take actions which contradict the fundamental principles of international law." In February 2023, Bzhania visited Minsk for a visit of his own, after which the Georgian Foreign Ministry described it as "an attempt to legitimize the Russian occupation regime." Lukashenko criticized Tbilisi's stance, saying to Bzhania “maybe these relations will be able to promote peace and friendship between Abkhazian and Georgian peoples.”

== High level visits ==
Guest	Host	Place of visit	Date of visit
(Belarus) Deputy Prime Minister Andrei Kobyakov	(Georgia (country)) President Mikheil Saakashvili	Batumi	2010
(Belarus) President Alexander Lukashenko	(Georgia (country)) President Giorgi Margvelashvili	Tbilisi, Batumi	April 2015
(Georgia (country)) Prime Minister Giorgi Kvirikashvili	(Belarus) President Alexander Lukashenko	Minsk	March 2016
(Georgia (country)) President Giorgi Margvelashvili	(Belarus) President Alexander Lukashenko	Minsk	March 1–2, 2017
(Georgia (country)) President Salomé Zourabichvili	(Belarus) President Alexander Lukashenko	Minsk	20-21 June 2019

== Envoys ==
Belarusian businessman Siarhei Tsiatsieryn is the Honorary Consul of Georgia in Belarus.

=== From Georgia to Belarus ===
- Davit Zalkalian (2008-2009)
- Giorgi Chkheidze (2010-2012)
- Davit Kotaria (2012–present)

=== From Belarus to Georgia ===
- Mikhail Myatlikov (July 12, 2016 – February 10, 2022)
- Anatoly Lis (since February 10, 2022)

== Resident diplomatic missions ==
- Belarus has an embassy in Tbilisi.
- Georgia has an embassy in Minsk.

== See also ==
- Foreign relations of Belarus
- Foreign relations of Georgia
