= Georgia–Latvia relations =

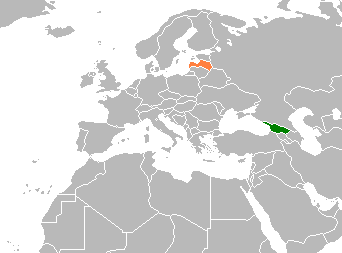

- Georgia: Latvia

Georgia–Latvia relations are the bilateral relations between Georgia and Latvia. Both countries are Post-Soviet states. Diplomatic relations between the two countries were established on 11 March 1993.

== History ==
Relations between Latvia and Georgia were established on 11 March 1993, following the restoration of independence by both countries after the dissolution of the Soviet Union. Since then, bilateral relations have developed on the basis of shared historical experiences, mutual support for sovereignty, and common interests in European integration.

In the early years, diplomatic representation was conducted through non-resident embassies. Latvia opened its embassy in Tbilisi in 2006, while Georgia established its embassy in Riga in 2007, marking a new stage in bilateral engagement.

Latvia has consistently supported Georgia's territorial integrity and Euro-Atlantic aspirations, including within the framework of the European Union's Eastern Partnership. Political dialogue has been maintained through regular high-level visits and cooperation between foreign ministries and parliaments.

In 2013, the two countries issued a joint postage stamp to commemorate the 20th anniversary of diplomatic relations. The 25th and 30th anniversaries in 2018 and 2023 were marked by joint statements and cultural events reaffirming bilateral ties.

While cooperation continues, relations have occasionally faced diplomatic tensions, including disagreements related to regional security and domestic political developments in Georgia. Nevertheless, Georgia and Latvia maintain active diplomatic relations and ongoing political dialogue.

== Diplomatic missions ==
Latvia maintains an embassy in Tbilisi, while Georgia maintains an embassy in Riga.

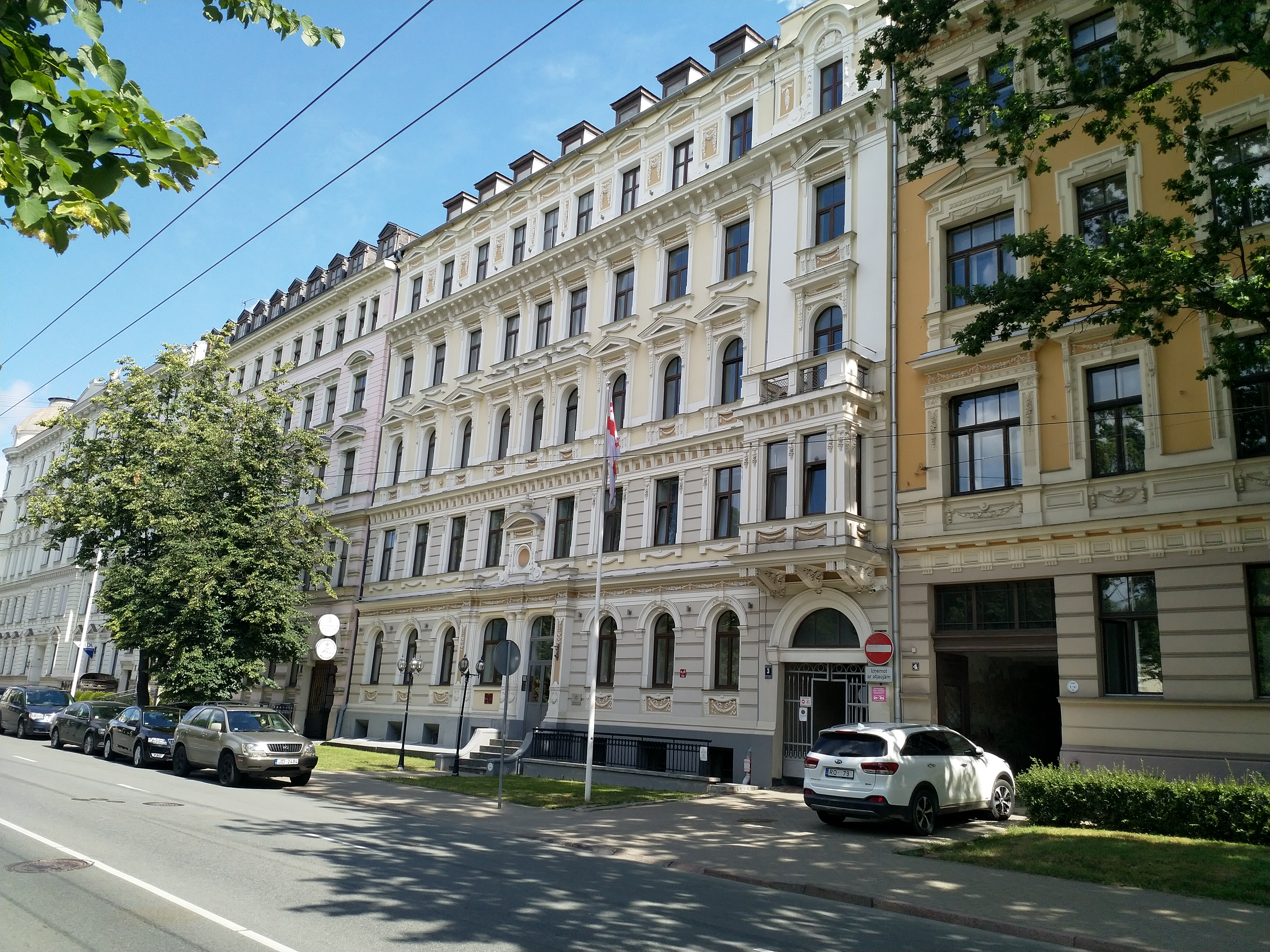
Embassy of Georgia in Riga

== See also ==
- Foreign relations of Georgia
- Foreign relations of Latvia
