= Georgia–Greece relations =

- Georgia: Greece

Diplomatic mission
- Embassy of Georgia, Athens: Embassy of Greece, Tbilisi

Georgia–Greece relations are foreign relations between Georgia and Greece. Both countries established embassy level diplomatic relations on April 20, 1992. Greeks have been present in Georgia since antiquity. Greece also recognizes the separatist regions of Abkhazia and South Ossetia as a part of Georgia. There were Greek colonies in present-day Georgia during ancient history.

There are between 15,000 and 25,000 Pontic Greeks in Georgia, although there are significantly fewer than there had been until the early 1990s, when many Georgian Greeks began to emigrate to Greece or southern Russia.

There were around 27,400 ethnic Georgians in Greece as of 2013. Most of them reside in Athens, Thessaloniki and the island of Crete. Both nations are members of the Council of Europe.

Current Ambassador of Georgia in Greece is Levan Beridze.

== Diplomatic missions ==
Republic of Georgia

- Athens (Embassy)

Republic of Greece

- Tbilisi (Embassy)

== See also ==
- Foreign relations of Georgia
- Foreign relations of Greece
- Georgia-NATO relations
- Georgia-EU relations
  - Accession of Georgia to the EU
- Greeks in Georgia
- Levan Beridze
