= Georgia–Iran relations =

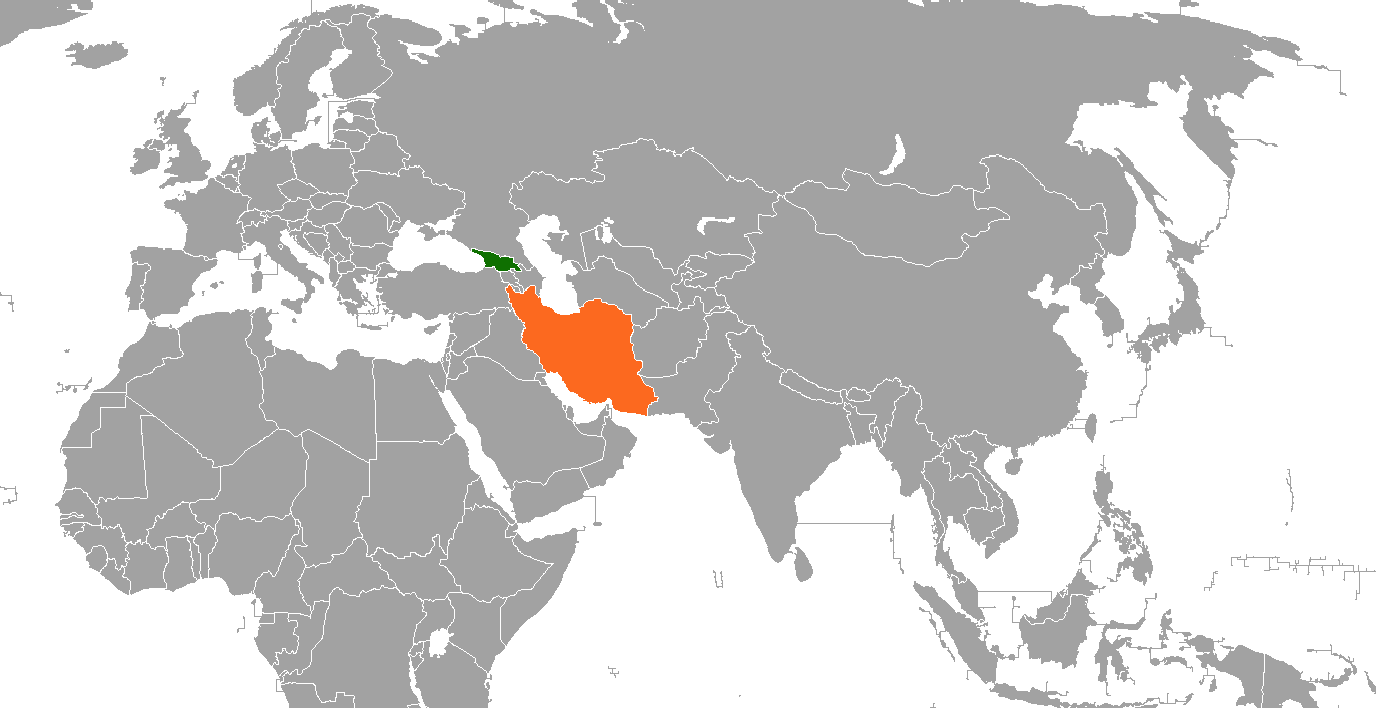

- Georgia: Iran

Iran (formerly Persia) and Georgia have had relations for millennia, although official diplomatic relations between the two nations in the 20th century were established on May 15, 1992. Georgia is represented by its embassy in Tehran, while Iran has its representative embassy in Tbilisi.

Following the 2008 financial crisis and the Russo-Georgian War, Georgia and Iran sought to increase their cooperation, leading to greater contacts between the two nations and resulting in progressive increase in the volume of bilateral trade. However, Georgia remains cautious of Iran because of Russian-Iranian partnership and has refused to participate in some regional political formats desired by Iran.

== Historical relations and context ==
From the Achaemenid era to the early 19th century, Iran (Persia) played a crucial role in shaping Georgian history. This influence extended to political institutions, social structures, land ownership, and cultural development. Additionally, the Iranian presence served as a counterbalance to other regional powers like the Romans, Byzantines, Ottoman Turks, and Russians. The relationship was reciprocal, as Georgians significantly contributed to Iran's military and administrative achievements, leaving a lasting impact on Iranian social structures, especially during the Safavid period. This continued until Russia conquered the Caucasus and Georgia in the first half of the 19th century, through the Russo-Persian War (1804-1813) and the Russo-Persian War (1826-1828), from Qajar Iran.

== 20th century ==
Until the early 1990s, Iran-Georgia relations were merged into Iran-Soviet relations. Since Georgia's independence from the Soviet Union, the two nations have cooperated in many fields including energy, transport, trade, education, and science.

== 2008 Georgia–Russia conflict ==
Due to its close relations with both Russia and Georgia, Iran at first attempted to remain relatively neutral throughout the war and beyond. Foreign Ministry spokesman Hassan Ghashghavi called "for an immediate halt to the clashes" and offer to help.

After Russia and its closest allies chose to recognize Abkhazia and South Ossetia, the Ambassador of Iran to Russia, Seyed Mahmoud-Reza Sajjadi, said in early February 2009 that his nation will not recognise Abkhazia and South Ossetia's independence in the near future, "as it can cause war in many areas," but on the other hand he did not rule out eventual Iranian recognition of the independence of the two areas. However, Sajjadi defended Russia's measures in the 2008 South Ossetia war and its decision to recognise Abkhazia and South Ossetia as independent nations. Sajjadi also said he sympathised with the people of Abkhazia and South Ossetia and that Tehran will work with Moscow to develop the two areas' economy.

== 2010 to present ==
The beginning of 2010 saw increasing cooperation between the two countries. Agents from Iran's foreign ministry visited Tbilisi in May 2010 to discuss Iranian investment in the construction of a hydroelectric plant in Georgia as well as Iran's intentions to import electricity from the country. The meeting led to president Mikheil Saakashvili inviting his Iranian counterpart Mahmood Ahmadinejad to Tbilisi.

In late May 2010 Iranian ambassador Majid Samadzade Saber announced that Iran and Georgia intend to lift visa restrictions for travel between the countries, which officially came in force in January 2011. According to the Iranian Ambassador, Iran and Georgia are holding talks on opening an Iranian consulate in Batumi, western Georgia. The announcement was scheduled during Iranian foreign minister Manouchehr Mottaki's visit to Tbilisi scheduled later in the month.

Georgia has reacted positively on the outcome between Iran and the P5+1 states about the relief of sanctions on Iran, in turn for regulations of Iran's nuclear program. As close geographical countries and being important trade partners, parliamentarians of both nations foresee an increase in bilateral relations between the nations.

On March 18, 2015, the 5th Summit of Iran-Georgia Joint Commission on Economic Cooperation was held in the Ministry of Labor and Social Affairs of Iran.

In May 2015, Iranian energy company MEPCO group announced its plans to build two power plants in Georgia.

== Notable ambassadors of Georgia to Iran ==
- Jemshid Giunashvili (1994–2004)

== Resident diplomatic missions ==
- Georgia has an embassy in Tehran.
- Iran has an embassy in Tbilisi and consulate-general in Batumi.

== See also ==
- Foreign relations of Georgia
- Foreign relations of Iran
- Iranian Georgians

== Sources ==
- Hitchins, Keith (2001). "Georgia ii. History of Iranian-Georgian Relations". Encyclopaedia Iranica, Vol. X, Fasc. 4. pp. 464–470.
