= Denmark–Georgia relations =

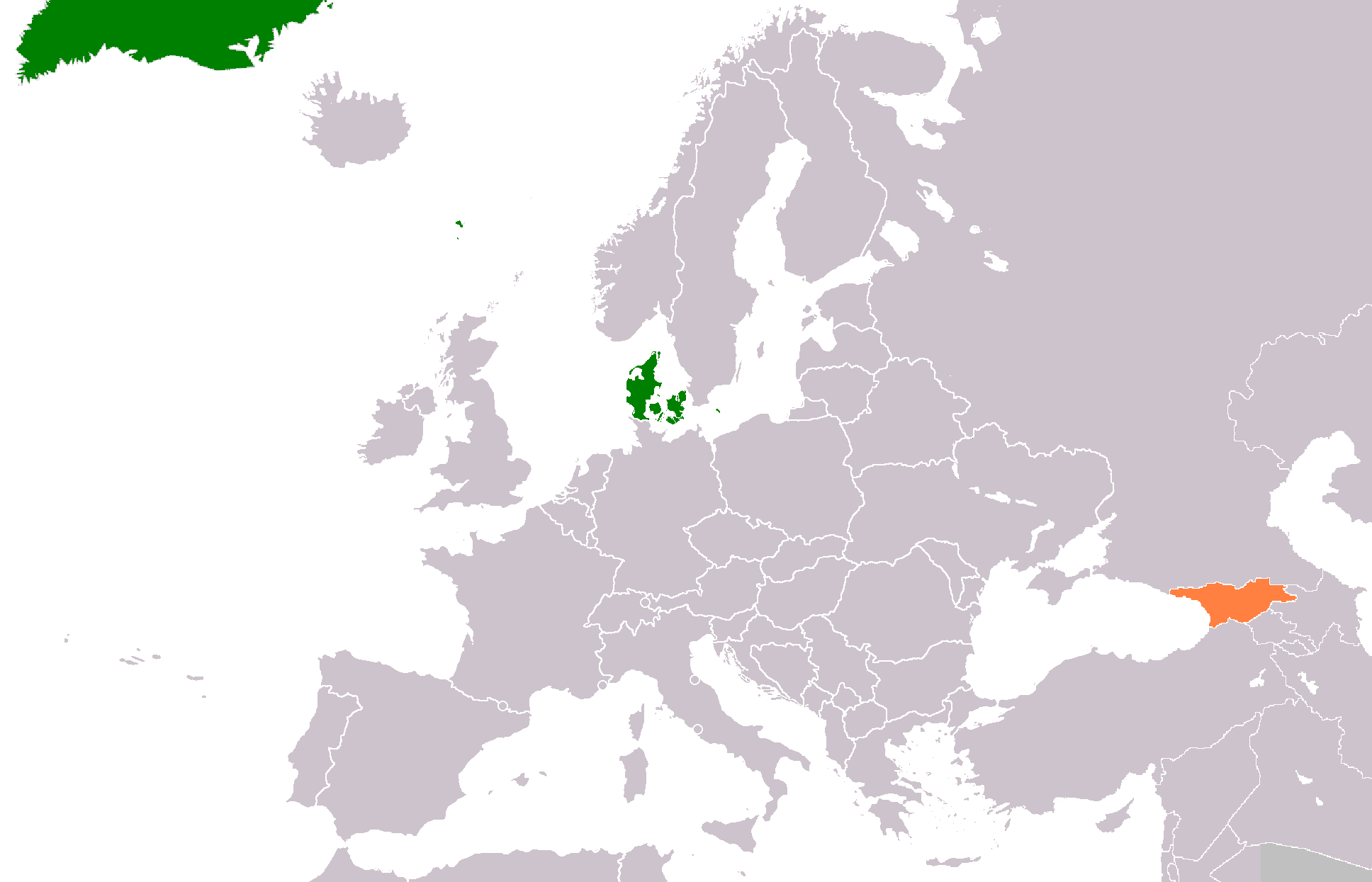
- Denmark: Georgia

Denmark–Georgia relations refers to the current and historical relations between Denmark and Georgia. Denmark is represented in Georgia, through its embassy in Tbilisi. Georgia has an embassy in Copenhagen. Denmark supports Georgia to become a member of the European Union and NATO. Both nations are members of the Council of Europe.

== History ==
Diplomatic relations between Georgia and Denmark were established on 1 July 1992. In 2007, Denmark and Georgia signed a memorandum in the sphere of migration. On 22 April 2009, a military agreement was signed between Denmark and Georgia.

Prime Minister Anders Fogh Rasmussen condemned Russia's attack on the Georgian province of South Ossetia. Although Anders Fogh Rasmussen says that it's hard to "put himself into the background" of the conflict in the breakaway province. In February 2010, the Danish delegation to the Parliamentary Assembly of the Council of Europe, said that "the international community is interested Russias complying obligations in regard to Georgia, and therefore pressure on Russia must be increased."

After the Russian invasion of Ukraine, Denmark increased its support for countries near Russia including Georgia. In 2023, Denmark and Georgia signed a new agreement to support cooperation in areas including culture, security, and the transition to green energy. In 2024 Denmark gave 10.8 million (USD) to a project launched by the United Nations Development Programme aiming to support the shift towards renewable energy in Moldova and Georgia including 4.29 million specifically marked for Georgia. Denmark also, however, issued a joint statement with several other European countries denouncing Georgia's proposed Transparency of Foreign Influence law. The Joint statement stated that the proposed law was "incompatible with European norms and values" and denounced the "anti western rhetoric" of Georgian authorities.

== Economic relations ==
In 2000, Georgian exports to Denmark amounted to $500.3 million, while Danish exports to Georgia totaled $2.771 billion. By 2010, Georgian exports increased to $5.14 billion, and Danish exports reached $15.077 billion.

More recent trade data between the two countries is as follows:

Year	Georgian Exports to Denmark (USD)	Danish Exports to Georgia (USD)
2017	$1.59 million	$16.6 million
2018	$1.69 million	$19.7 million
2022	$10.2 million	$27.4 million
2023	$2.66 million	$41.8 million

== Development assistance ==
In the Neighbourhood Programme, Georgia has a high priority. A programme for good governance and human rights in Georgia and a programme for displaced people. $4 million was given to the programme. During the war in 2008, Danish Red Cross sent 1 million DKK to the victims. After the war in August 2008, Denmark increased aid to Georgia by 10 times. Denmark assisted 71 million DKK to Georgia for the private sector and to democracy and human rights.

Entering its fourth phase in 2017, the Danish Neighbourhood Programme had an overall budget of DKK 860 million over five years, with approximately 30% allocated to Georgia. The programme aimed to contribute to the development of democratic societies with accountable public authorities and active civil societies.

In February 2023, Denmark launched a new four-year project supporting peace and stabilization in Georgia. With an estimated budget of 27.12 million GEL, the programme focuses on training and strengthening Georgia’s defense and emergency service institutions.

In 2024, Denmark, in collaboration with the United Nations Development Programme (UNDP), initiated a four-year, $10.8 million project to promote an inclusive and green transition in Georgia and Moldova. Approximately $4.29 million is allocated to Georgia, focusing on enhancing environmental governance, reducing greenhouse gas emissions, and promoting renewable energy practices.

As of mid-2024, Denmark conducted a full review of its bilateral aid and assistance to Georgia. During this review, some planned activities and new programming support to Georgian authorities were put on hold, following the EU Council’s decision to review direct financial assistance to Georgia.

== State visits ==
Danish Prime Minister Anders Fogh Rasmussen paid a visit to Georgia on 27 November 2008, where he met Georgian President Mikheil Saakashvili, Prime Minister Grigol Mgaloblishvili and the Speaker of Parliament David Bakradze. Danish Foreign Minister Per Stig Møller met with Georgian opposition politicians in October 2009. Per Stig Møller also visited Sukhumi, Abkhazia where he met Abkhazian Foreign Minister Sergey Shamba. Georgian President Mikheil Saakashvili visited Denmark for the 2009 United Nations Climate Change Conference meeting in Copenhagen.

In April 2014, Danish Foreign Minister Martin Lidegaard visited Georgia, meeting with his counterpart Maia Panjikidze, Prime Minister Irakli Garibashvili, and President Giorgi Margvelashvili. Discussions focused on political cooperation, economic trade, and regional security. Lidegaard reaffirmed Denmark’s support for Georgia’s sovereignty, territorial integrity, and its European and Atlantic integration aspirations.

In February 2018, Danish Foreign Minister Anders Samuelsen traveled to Georgia, where he held meetings with senior officials, including President Giorgi Margvelashvili and Prime Minister Giorgi Kvirikashvili. The visit aimed to discuss and enhance bilateral relations between the two countries.

In May 2023, Danish Foreign Minister Lars Løkke Rasmussen conducted a two-day official visit to Georgia. During this visit, he met with Prime Minister Irakli Garibashvili and Foreign Minister Ilia Darchiashvili. A significant highlight was the official opening of the Danish Embassy in Tbilisi, symbolizing Denmark's commitment to supporting Georgia's sovereignty and its European aspirations. Rasmussen also visited the Administrative Boundary Line to observe the ongoing challenges posed by Russian "borderization."

== See also ==
- Foreign relations of Denmark
- Foreign relations of Georgia
- Georgia-NATO relations
- Georgia-EU relations
  - Accession of Georgia to the EU
