= Georgia–Holy See relations =

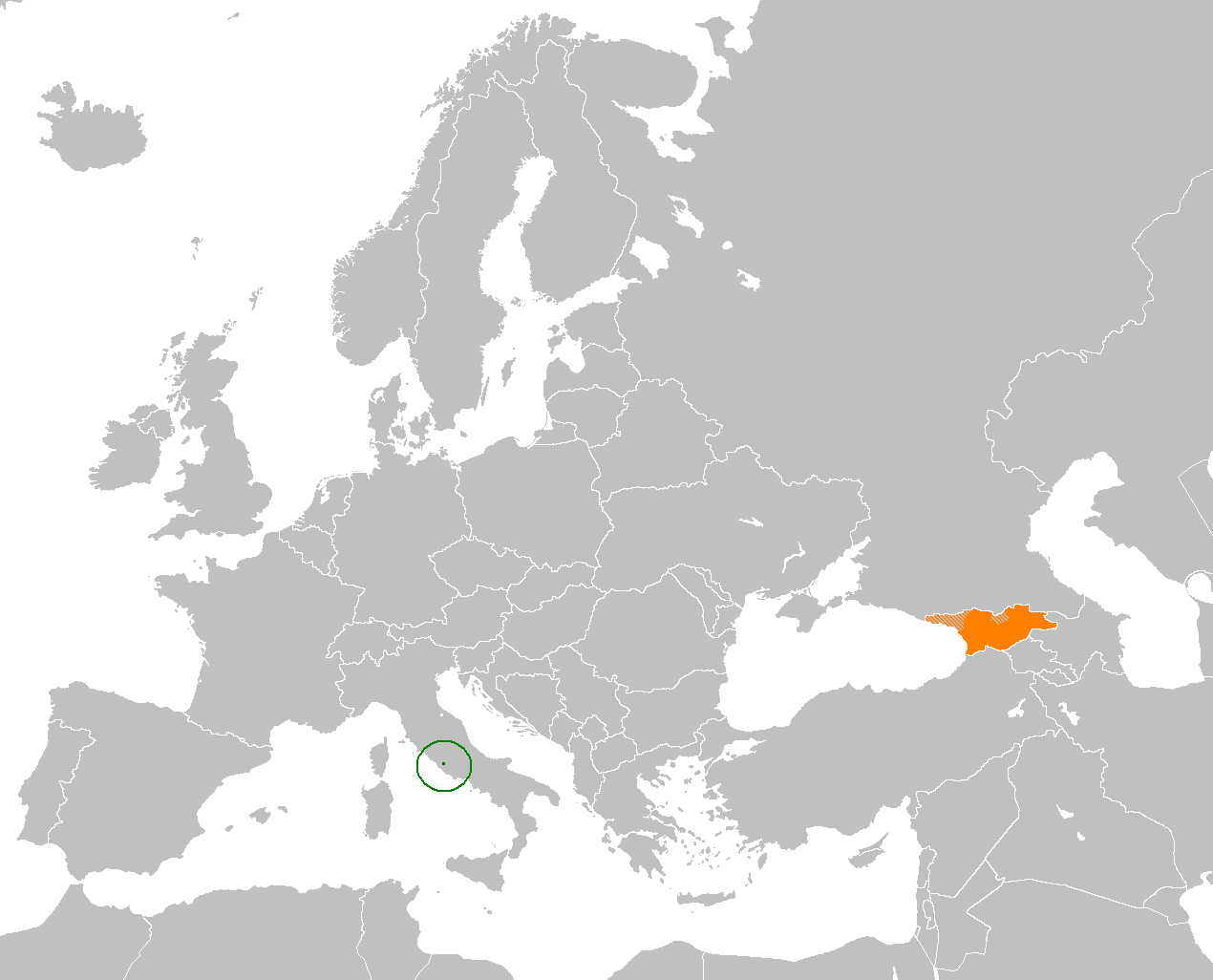
- Holy See: Georgia

Georgia–Holy See relations are bilateral relations between Georgia and the Holy See. The diplomatic relations between the two were established on May 5, 1992. The Georgian Embassy to the Holy See is located in 25 Via Toscana, Rome. The Apostolic Nunciature is located in 40 Zghenti Street, Tbilisi.

== History ==
The diplomatic relations between Georgia and the Holy See span centuries. Georgian kings and princes frequently exchanged letters and embassies with the Holy See and there was a significant upsurge in Roman Catholic missionary efforts in Georgia in the 17th and 18th centuries. Georgia became independent from the Soviet Union in 1991 and established diplomatic relations with the Holy See on May 5, 1992. The Apostolic Nunciature in the Georgian capital of Tbilisi also represents the Holy See in Georgia's South Caucasian neighbors—Armenia and Azerbaijan. Through the charity Caritas the Holy See has been involved in humanitarian activities in Georgia.

Pope John Paul II visited Tbilisi in November 1999. Shortly after this visit Georgia and the Holy See started working on a draft treaty, which became a subject of controversy in largely Orthodox Christian Georgia. The treaty, envisaging granting a Catholic church a legal status in Georgia, was to be ratified on September 20, 2003, and Archbishop Jean-Louis Tauran, then-Secretary for Relations with States, arrived in Tbilisi for this occasion. Conservative Orthodox elements responded with a mass protest rally and Ilia II, an influential Catholicos Patriarch of the Georgian Orthodox Church, himself expressed skepticism regarding the treaty. The then-President of Georgia Eduard Shevardnadze, being absent at the CIS summit in Yalta, Ukraine, yielded to the pressure and made a last-minute decision not to sign the treaty, drawing criticism from the Holy See representatives, human rights activists, and liberal Orthodox clerics. Shevardnadze expressed regret over the failure of the agreement and added that work over the treaty would continue.

In May 2010, President of Georgia Mikheil Saakashvili became the first Georgian leader to visit Vatican City on a state visit. He met Pope Benedict XVI and later, attending a Catholic Christmas service in Tbilisi, thanked the Holy See for "steadfast support" to Georgia's sovereignty and territorial integrity. On January 9, 2012, Benedict XVI hailed Georgia's amended legislature on religious minorities adopted in July 2011. On 30 September–1 October 2016, Pope Francis paid a two-day visit to Georgia, meeting President Giorgi Margvelashvili and Georgian Orthodox Patriarch Ilia II.

== Ambassadors of Georgia to the Holy See ==
- Amiran Kavadze, 2001–2004 (resident in Geneve)
- Khétévane Bagration de Moukhrani, 2005–2014
- Tamar Grdzelidze, 2014 – present

== Nuncios to Georgia ==
- Jean-Paul Aimé Gobel, 1993–1998
- Peter Stephan Zurbriggen, 1998–2001
- Claudio Gugerotti, 2001–2011
- Marek Solczyński, 2011–present.

== See also ==
- Foreign relations of Georgia
- Foreign relations of the Holy See
