= Georgia–Malaysia relations =

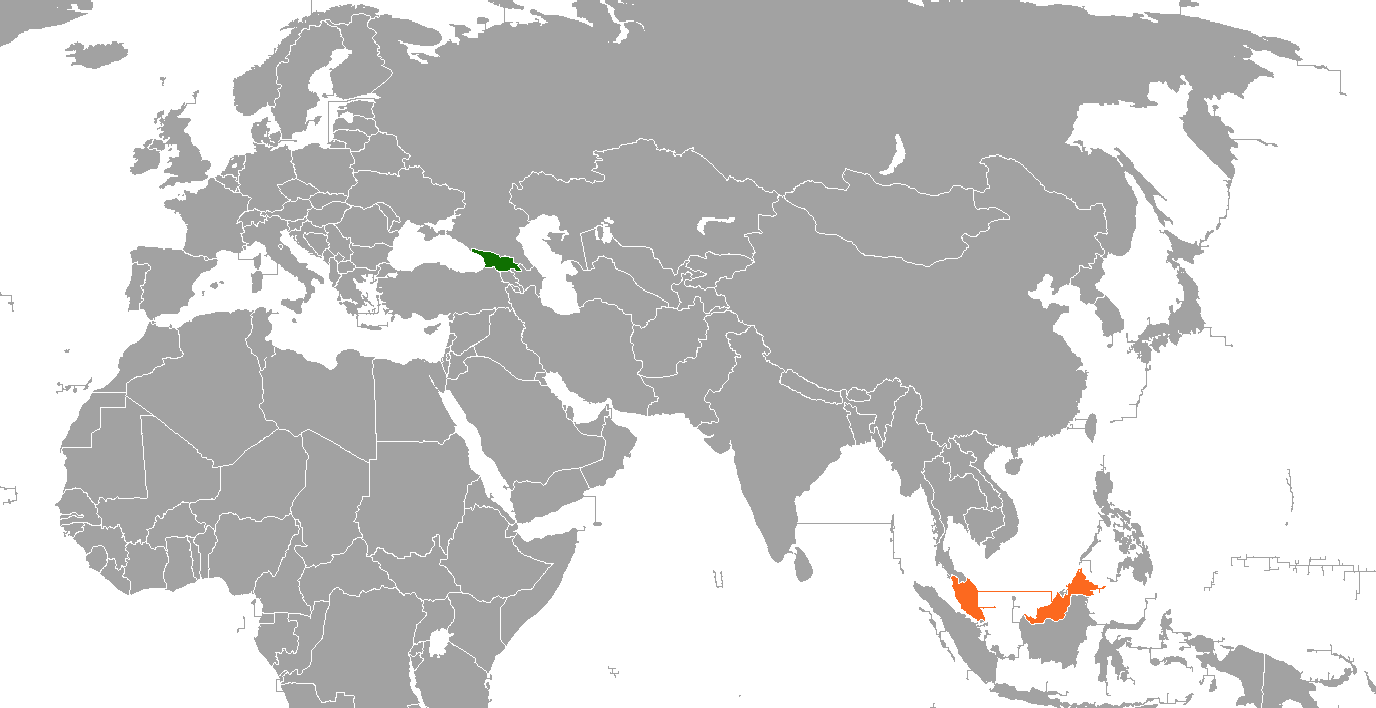

- Georgia: Malaysia

Diplomatic mission
- Georgian Embassy, Kuala Lumpur: Malaysian Embassy, Kyiv

Georgia–Malaysia relations are foreign relations between Georgia and Malaysia. Both countries established diplomatic relation on May 7, 1993. Georgia has an embassy in Kuala Lumpur. The Georgian embassy was established in December 2013. As of 2015, there was no Malaysian embassy in Georgia, Malaysia is represented in Georgia through its embassy in Kyiv (Ukraine).

In 2018, a free trade agreement was proposed between the two countries. Malaysia has voiced support for Georgia's territorial integrity. Georgia has also sought closer relations with Malaysia via closer relations with the ASEAN grouping, and applied for observer status at the Asean Inter-Parliamentary Assembly in September 2017.

== Diplomatic missions ==
- Georgia has an embassy in Kuala Lumpur.
- Malaysia is accredited to Georgia from its embassy in Kyiv, Ukraine.

== See also ==
- Foreign relations of Georgia
- Foreign relations of Malaysia
