= Georgia–Slovenia relations =

- Georgia: Slovenia

Diplomatic mission
- Embassy of Georgia, Ljubljana: Embassy of Slovenia, Kyiv

Georgia–Slovenia relations are the bilateral relations between Georgia and Slovenia, two European nations with a communist past that established their bilateral ties in 1993. Their relations have been highly represented with a close diplomatic partnership, with Slovenia being one of the staunch supporters of Georgia's territorial integrity and pro-Western path. Slovenia is a member of the EU, which Georgia applied for in 2022. Both nations are members of the COE. And Slovenia is with Montenegro is Sectoral dialogue partner countries of the BSCE.

== History ==
The diplomatic relations between Georgia and Slovenia were established on 18 January 1993:, less than two years after the independence of both states (Georgia from the USSR and Slovenia from Yugoslavia). Slovenia has consistently supported Georgia's territorial integrity in the face of Russia's military occupation of Abkhazia and South Ossetia. In 2008, Prime Minister Janez Janša of Slovenia stated following a meeting with his Czech and Latvian counterparts in the aftermath of the Russo-Georgian War,

We are united on the need to ensure peace, stability, territorial integrity in Georgia and the broader region and to give the region a European perspective.

Slovenia was one of the several nations to call on Russia to follow its ceasefire obligations during a 2015 Council of Europe meeting and to withdraw its military troops from Abkhazia and South Ossetia. That same year, Slovenia became the 21st member state of the European Union to ratify in a 69–3 vote of its National Assembly the EU-Georgia Association Agreement. Slovenia has consistently voted in favor of the Georgia-sponsored United Nations resolution calling for the return of internally displaced persons to Abkhazia and South Ossetia since 2008.

Bilateral ties have been enhanced by the high amount of high-level meetings and visits between the two countries. While Georgian Prime Minister Giorgi Kvirikashvili held several meetings with the Slovenian Foreign Affairs Minister, President Giorgi Margvelashvili became the first Georgian head of state to pay an official visit to Slovenia in July 2016, during which bilateral agreements were signed on economic cooperation and visa liberalization and a "Bench of Friendship" was inaugurated on Ljubljana's Tbilisi Street.

On 26 May 2018, to celebrate the 100 years since the independence of the Democratic Republic of Georgia, the Ljubljana Castle was lit up with Georgia's red and white flag colors.

As a member of NATO, Slovenia has consistently supported Georgia's attempt to seek closer relations and an ultimate membership with the Organization. Slovenian military experts participated in the 2017 Noble Partner military exercises in Georgia.

On 13 June 2019, Slovenia became the 14th country of the Schengen Zone to recognize Georgia as a "safe country", highlighting Georgia's political and economic reforms, and thus removing Georgian citizens' right to seek asylum in Slovenia.

Both countries' capitals, Ljubljana and Tbilisi, have a sister city partnership, as well as Georgia's Kutaisi and Slovenia's Maribor.

== Diplomatic missions ==
Georgia appointed its first ambassador to Slovenia in 2001, when it accredited its ambassador to Austria to also cover its relations with Ljubljana. Following a short period in 2004 when the Georgian ambassador operated from Georgia itself and then from Slovakia, an embassy of Georgia was opened in 2014 in Slovenia. Notable heads of the mission have been:

- 2001–2004: Giorgi Arsenishvili (residence in Vienna)

Slovenia accredited its first ambassador to Georgia in 1999. Until 2007, the Slovenian ambassador resided in Athens. Since then, the ambassador of Slovenia to Ukraine in Kyiv has also covered Georgia.

== Bilateral agreements ==
Georgia and Slovenia have signed seven bilateral agreements, including

- Protocol on Cooperation between the MFA of Georgia and the MFA of the Republic of Slovenia, signed in April 2002 and enforced since January 2008
- Agreement between the Executive Authority of Georgia and the Government of the Republic of Slovenia on Cooperation in the Fields of Culture, Education, Science, Sport, and Youth, signed in April 2002 and enforced since December 2005
- Agreement between Georgia and the Republic of Slovenia for the Avoidance of Double Taxation and the Prevention of Fiscal Evasion with Respect to Taxes on Income and on Capital, signed in December 2012 and enforced since September 2013.
- Memorandum of Understanding between the Chambers of Commerce and Industry of Georgia and Slovenia, signed in 2016.

Two more bilateral agreements were signed during Georgian President Giorgi Margvelashvili's official visit to Slovenia in 2016, notably on economic cooperation and on visa liberalization between Georgia and Slovenia.

== Resident diplomatic missions ==
- Georgia has an embassy in Ljubljana.
- Slovenia is accredited to Georgia from its embassy in Kyiv, Ukraine.

== See also ==
- Foreign relations of Georgia
- Foreign relations of Slovenia
