= Finland–Georgia relations =

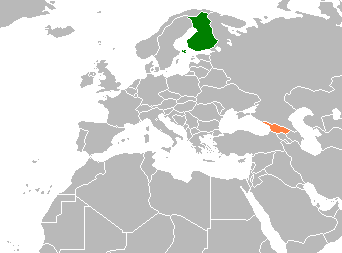
- Finland: Georgia

Finland–Georgia relations are the bilateral relations between Finland and Georgia. Before 1918, both countries were part of the Russian Empire. Finland recognised Georgia on 27 March 1992. Both countries established diplomatic relations on 8 July 1992. Finland is represented in Georgia by a non resident ambassador (based in Helsinki at the Ministry of Foreign Affairs) and an honorary consulate in Tbilisi. Georgia has an embassy in Helsinki. Both countries are full members of the Council of Europe.

== History ==
In October 2025, Finnish Foreign Minister Elina Valtonen visited Tbilisi, Georgia, in her capacity as OSCE Chairperson-in-Office, amid mass protests outside the Georgian Parliament. She briefly met with demonstrators. The visit occurred in the context of ongoing unrest over the controversial foreign agents law and growing criticism of the Georgian Dream government's perceived antidemocratic and anti-Western policies, which raised international concern about Georgia's democratic trajectory, as well as allegations of electoral fraud in the 2024 Georgian parliamentary election, drawing international attention to concerns about democratic backsliding in Georgia. On 14 October, she visited the protest in front of Rustaveli Avenue. Following this, the Ministry of Internal Affair fined her ₾5,000. Valtonen responded by quoting from the 1975 Helsinki Final Act (a) VII, which says that states "will promote and encourage the effective exercise of civil, political, economic, social, cultural and other rights and freedoms" and by inviting Kobakhidze to visit Finland to "meet the free press and observe any demonstration of [his] liking".

== Resident diplomatic missions ==
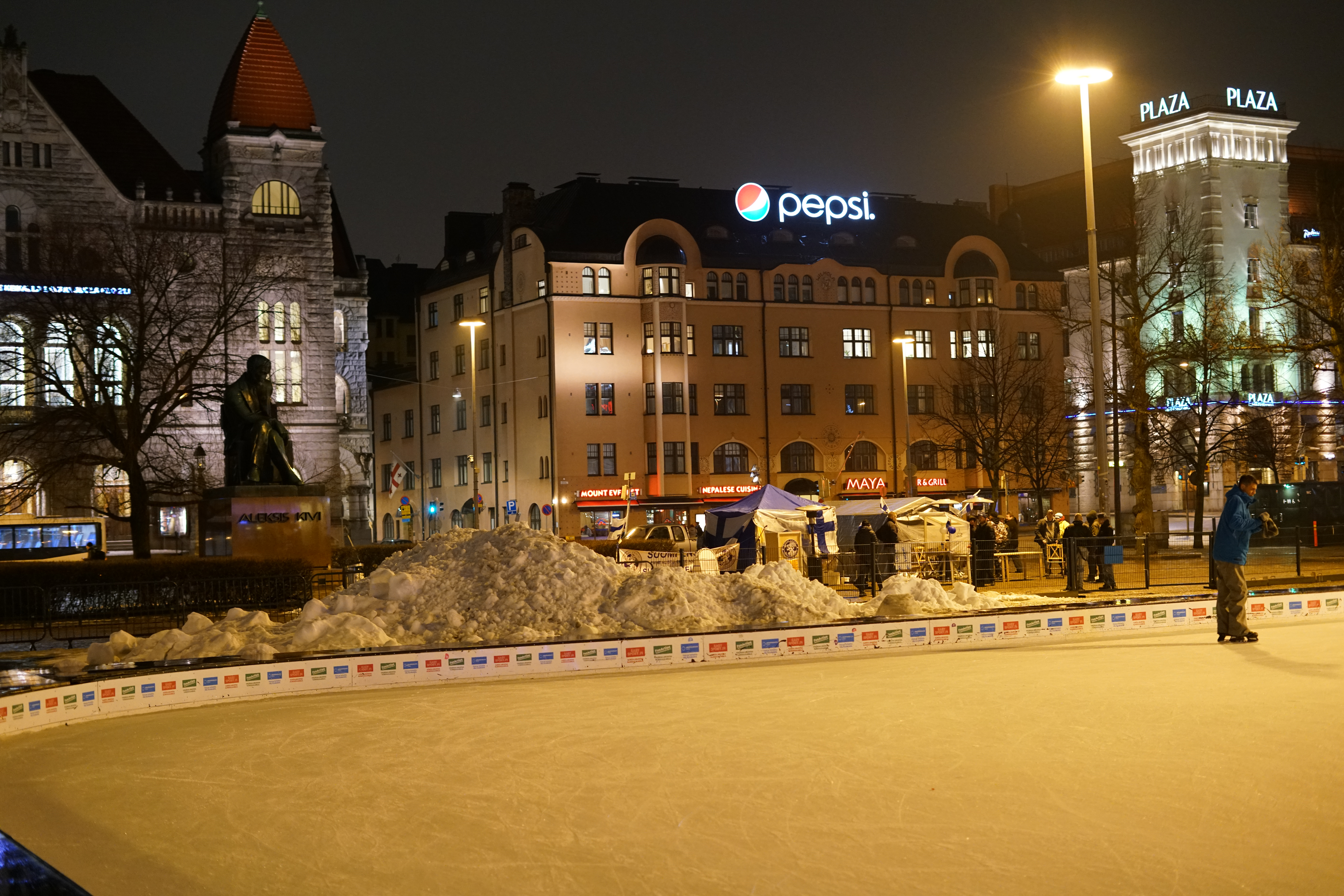
Embassy of Georgia in Helsinki

- Finland is represented in Georgia by a non resident ambassador (based in Helsinki at the Ministry of Foreign Affairs) and an honorary consulate in Tbilisi.
- Georgia has an embassy in Helsinki.

== See also ==
- Foreign relations of Finland
- Foreign relations of Georgia
