= Foreign relations of Georgia =

Georgia's location, nestled between the Black Sea, Russia, and Turkey, renders it strategically important. It is developing as the gateway from the Black Sea to the Caucasus and the larger Caspian region, but also serves as a buffer between Russia and Turkey. Georgia has a long and tumultuous relationship with Russia, but it is reaching out to its other neighbours and looking to the West in search of alternatives and opportunities. It signed a partnership and cooperation agreement with the European Union, participates in the Partnership for Peace, and encourages foreign investment. France, Germany, South Korea, the United Kingdom, and the United States all have embassies in Tbilisi. Georgia in 2004-2008 sought to become a member of NATO, but did not succeed in the face of strong Russian opposition.

Georgia is a member of the United Nations, the Council of Europe, and the OSCE. Because of its strategic location, Georgia is in both the Russian and American spheres of influence; however, Georgia's relationship with Russia is at its lowest point since 1921 due to Russo-Georgian War. As a result, Georgia broke off diplomatic relations with Russia and has left the Commonwealth of Independent States.

== Diplomatic relations ==
List of countries which Georgia maintains diplomatic relations with:

#	Country	Date
1	New Zealand	11 March 1992
2	United States	24 March 1992
3	Austria	25 March 1992
4	Germany	13 April 1992
5	Cuba	18 April 1992
6	Greece	20 April 1992
7	Netherlands	22 April 1992
—	State of Palestine	25 April 1992
8	United Kingdom	27 April 1992
9	Poland	28 April 1992
10	Egypt	11 May 1992
11	Italy	11 May 1992
12	Mongolia	12 May 1992
13	Hungary	14 May 1992
14	Iran	15 May 1992
15	Turkey	21 May 1992
—	Holy See	23 May 1992
16	Portugal	23 May 1992
17	Israel	1 June 1992
18	Belgium	5 June 1992
19	Bulgaria	5 June 1992
20	Norway	5 June 1992
21	Chile	8 June 1992
22	Mexico	8 June 1992
23	China	9 June 1992
24	Liechtenstein	10 June 1992
25	Switzerland	10 June 1992
26	Armenia	17 June 1992
27	Estonia	17 June 1992
28	Moldova	25 June 1992
29	Romania	25 June 1992
30	Vietnam	30 June 1992
31	Denmark	1 July 1992
—	Russia (suspended)	1 July 1992
32	Finland	8 July 1992
33	Cyprus	9 July 1992
34	Spain	9 July 1992
35	Kyrgyzstan	10 July 1992
36	Australia	16 July 1992
37	Turkmenistan	16 July 1992
38	Thailand	21 July 1992
39	Ukraine	22 July 1992
40	Canada	23 July 1992
41	Kazakhstan	23 July 1992
42	Zimbabwe	24 July 1992
43	Morocco	30 July 1992
44	Japan	3 August 1992
45	France	21 August 1992
46	Bangladesh	27 August 1992
47	Kuwait	3 September 1992
48	Sweden	19 September 1992
49	Iceland	21 September 1992
50	Philippines	21 September 1992
51	India	28 September 1992
52	United Arab Emirates	20 October 1992
53	Argentina	2 November 1992
54	Azerbaijan	8 November 1992
55	Ghana	4 December 1992
56	South Korea	14 December 1992
57	Czech Republic	1 January 1993
58	Slovakia	1 January 1993
59	Indonesia	25 January 1993
60	Slovenia	28 January 1993
61	Croatia	1 February 1993
62	Malta	1 February 1993
63	Monaco	1 February 1993
64	Singapore	26 February 1993
65	Sudan	10 March 1993
66	Latvia	11 March 1993
67	Qatar	16 March 1993
68	Burundi	21 March 1993
69	Lebanon	1 April 1993
70	South Africa	23 April 1993
71	Brazil	28 April 1993
72	Malaysia	7 May 1993
73	Bahrain	10 May 1993
—	Syria (suspended)	18 May 1993
74	Algeria	27 May 1993
75	Ethiopia	29 June 1993
76	Albania	8 July 1993
77	Zambia	14 October 1993
78	Belarus	6 January 1994
79	Jordan	6 April 1994
80	Libya	10 May 1994
81	Uruguay	11 May 1994
82	Pakistan	12 May 1994
83	Saudi Arabia	27 May 1994
84	Afghanistan	12 July 1994
85	Tajikistan	4 August 1994
86	Uzbekistan	19 August 1994
—	Nicaragua (suspended)	14 September 1994
87	Lithuania	16 September 1994
88	Luxembourg	17 October 1994
89	North Korea	3 November 1994
90	Cambodia	17 November 1994
91	Serbia	26 June 1995
92	Yemen	5 September 1995
93	Ivory Coast	21 December 1995
94	Tunisia	7 March 1996
95	Jamaica	31 July 1996
96	Ireland	12 September 1996
97	Mozambique	13 September 1996
98	San Marino	19 November 1996
99	Angola	10 March 1997
100	Sierra Leone	7 April 1997
101	Colombia	6 June 1997
102	Ecuador	28 January 1998
103	Bosnia and Herzegovina	16 March 1998
104	Costa Rica	5 May 1998
105	Sri Lanka	16 June 1998
—	Sovereign Military Order of Malta	24 July 1998
106	Guinea	31 July 1998
107	Laos	6 November 1998
108	Panama	18 November 1998
109	Bolivia	20 November 1998
110	El Salvador	17 May 1999
111	Myanmar	16 August 1999
112	Nigeria	June 2000
113	Djibouti	22 November 2000
114	Nepal	22 September 2005
115	Andorra	5 April 2006
116	Oman	1 January 2007
117	Madagascar	24 May 2007
118	Iraq	18 September 2007
119	Montenegro	29 October 2007
120	Peru	14 January 2010
121	Botswana	15 January 2010
122	Cape Verde	22 January 2010
123	Dominican Republic	22 January 2010
124	Marshall Islands	18 February 2010
125	Saint Lucia	25 February 2010
126	Brunei	1 March 2010
127	Liberia	4 March 2010
128	Paraguay	9 March 2010
129	Maldives	11 March 2010
130	Samoa	12 March 2010
131	Comoros	26 March 2010
132	Fiji	29 March 2010
133	Antigua and Barbuda	7 April 2010
134	Gambia	21 April 2010
135	Guatemala	27 April 2010
136	Saint Vincent and the Grenadines	22 June 2010
137	Equatorial Guinea	23 June 2010
138	Kenya	2 July 2010
139	Senegal	19 August 2010
140	Uganda	9 December 2010
141	Dominica	15 December 2010
142	Central African Republic	20 December 2010
143	Democratic Republic of the Congo	14 January 2011
144	Somalia	26 January 2011
145	Tuvalu	4 February 2011
146	Mauritius	3 March 2011
147	Republic of the Congo	3 March 2011
148	Guinea-Bissau	9 March 2011
149	Honduras	9 March 2011
150	Solomon Islands	11 March 2011
151	Rwanda	23 March 2011
152	Trinidad and Tobago	8 April 2011
153	Bahamas	13 May 2011
154	Suriname	27 May 2011
155	Mauritania	16 June 2011
156	Federated States of Micronesia	12 August 2011
157	Gabon	19 September 2011
158	Malawi	19 September 2011
159	Palau	17 October 2011
160	Saint Kitts and Nevis	26 October 2011
161	Grenada	23 November 2011
162	Haiti	16 December 2011
163	Timor-Leste	22 December 2011
164	Eritrea	24 February 2012
165	Guyana	23 April 2012
166	Niger	30 May 2012
167	Mali	31 May 2012
168	South Sudan	15 June 2012
169	Kiribati	28 September 2012
170	Burkina Faso	2 October 2012
171	Seychelles	15 March 2013
172	Vanuatu	12 July 2013
173	Lesotho	23 September 2013
174	Cameroon	26 September 2013
175	Togo	27 May 2014
176	Chad	19 June 2014
177	São Tomé and Príncipe	12 September 2014
178	Benin	25 September 2014
179	Tonga	18 February 2015
180	Namibia	5 November 2015
181	Eswatini	20 May 2016
182	Papua New Guinea	4 October 2016
183	Belize	1 October 2017
184	Barbados	8 March 2018
185	Tanzania	20 October 2018
186	North Macedonia	15 March 2019
187	Nauru	21 September 2026

== Relations by country ==
=== Multilateral ===
Organization	Formal Relations Began	Notes
European Union		See Georgia–European Union relations and Accession of Georgia to the European Union
NATO		See Georgia–NATO relations

=== Africa ===
Country	Formal Relations Began	Notes
Algeria	27 May 1993	See Algeria–Georgia relations: Both countries established diplomatic relations on 27 May 1993.; Algeria is represented in Georgia through its embassy in Ankara, Turkey.; Georgia is represented in Algeria through its embassy in Madrid, Spain.
Egypt	11 May 1992	See Egypt–Georgia relations: Egypt is represented in Georgia through its embassy in Yerevan (Armenia).; Georgia has an embassy in Cairo.; Georgian Ministry of Foreign Affairs about the relation with Egypt; Georgian foreign minister visits Egypt
South Africa	23 April 1994	See Georgia–South Africa relations: South Africa is represented in Georgia through its embassy in Kyiv (Ukraine).; Georgian Ministry of Foreign Affairs about the relations with South Africa; South African Department of Foreign Affairs about the relations with Georgia

=== Americas ===
Country	Formal Relations Began	Notes
Brazil	April 1993	See Brazil–Georgia relations: Brazil has an embassy in Tbilisi.; Georgia has an embassy in Brasília.
Canada	23 July 1992	See Canada–Georgia relations: Canada is accredited to Georgia from its embassy in Ankara, Turkey.; Georgia has an embassy in Ottawa.
Mexico	8 June 1992	See Georgia–Mexico relations: Georgia has an embassy in Mexico City.; Mexico is accredited to Georgia from its embassy in Ankara, Turkey and maintains an honorary consulate in Tbilisi.
Nicaragua (Note: Has recognized Abkhazia and South Ossetia independence)	14 September 1994 — 28 November 2008	See Georgia–Nicaragua relations Nicaraguan-Georgian diplomatic relations established on 19 September 1994 and ended on 29 November 2008. The Georgian Foreign Ministry said that it had cut diplomatic ties with Nicaragua in a response to the latter's recognition of independence of breakaway South Ossetia and Abkhazia.
United States	23 April 1992	See Georgia–United States relations On 9 January 2009, the U.S. Secretary of State Condoleezza Rice and Georgian Foreign Minister Grigol Vashadze signed a Charter on Strategic Partnership, a nonbinding document outlining areas of cooperation and reiterating the U.S. support for Georgia's territorial integrity and to Georgia's NATO membership.

=== Asia ===
Country	Formal Relations Began	Notes
Armenia	17 July 1992	See Armenia–Georgia relations: There are nearly 250,000 Armenians in Georgia, among them 115,000 living in Samtskhe-Javakheti and 83,000 in Tbilisi. The Georgian minority in Armenia is less sizable.; Armenia and Georgia have a long history of cultural and political relations. The interaction peaked in the Middle Ages when both nations engaged in prolific cultural dialogue and allied themselves against the neighboring Muslim empires. There were frequent intermarriages between Armenian and Georgian the royal and noble families and both ethnicities intermingled in several border areas.; Armenia has an embassy in Tbilisi and a general consulate in Batumi.; Georgia has an embassy in Yerevan.; Both countries are full members of the Euronest Parliamentary Assembly and the EU's Eastern Partnership.
Azerbaijan	18 November 1992	See Azerbaijan–Georgia relations: There are 284,761 Azeris in Georgia. They are the largest minority of Georgia and comprise 6.5% of Georgia's population mostly in Kvemo Kartli, Kakheti, Shida Kartli and Mtskheta-Mtianeti. There is also a large Azeri community in the capital city of Tbilisi. The Georgian minority in Azerbaijan is less sizable. They are known as Ingiloy and are mostly concentrated in northwestern Azerbaijan.; Azerbaijan has an embassy in Tbilisi and a general consulate in Batumi.; Georgia has an embassy in Baku and a general consulate in Ganja.; Both countries are full members of the Council of Europe, the Organization for Security and Co-operation in Europe (OSCE) and the Organization of the Black Sea Economic Cooperation (BSEC).
China	9 June 1992	See China–Georgia relations: China recognized the independence of Georgia on 27 December 1991.; China has an embassy in Tbilisi.; Georgia has an embassy in Beijing.; Chinese Ministry of Foreign Affairs about the relations with Georgia; Georgian Ministry of Foreign Affairs about the relations with China
East Timor	22 December 2011	Georgia is represented in Timor by its embassy in Jakarta.
Hong Kong		See Georgia–Hong Kong relations
India	28 September 1992	See Georgia–India relations: Georgia has an embassy in New Delhi.; India is represented in Georgia through its embassy in Yerevan (Armenia) and an honorary consulate in Tbilisi.; Georgian Ministry of Foreign Affairs about relations with India
Iran	15 May 1992	See Persia-Georgia relations, Georgia–Iran relations: Persia and Georgia have had relations for thousands of years.
Iraq	18 September 2007	See Georgia–Iraq relations
Israel	1 June 1992	See Georgia–Israel relations: Georgia has an embassy in Tel Aviv.; Israel has an embassy in Tbilisi.; There are 13,000 Georgian Jews living in Georgia.
Japan	3 August 1992	See Georgia–Japan relations: Since November 2006, Georgia has maintained an embassy in Tokyo.; Japan has an embassy in Tbilisi.; Georgian Ministry of Foreign Affairs about the relations with Japan: Japanese Ministry of Foreign Affairs about the relations with Georgia
Kazakhstan	24 July 1992	See Georgia–Kazakhstan relations: Georgia has an embassy in Astana and an honorary consulate in Almaty.; Kazakhstan has an embassy in Tbilisi.; Both countries are full members of the Organization for Security and Co-operation in Europe.; Georgian Ministry of Foreign Affairs about the relation with Kazakhstan; Kazakh Ministry of Foreign Affairs about the relation with Georgia
Kuwait		Georgia has an embassy in Kuwait City.; Kuwait is accredited to Georgia from its embassy in Yerevan, Armenia.
Kyrgyzstan	10 July 1992	See Georgia–Kyrgyzstan relations: Georgia is represented in Kyrgyzstan by its embassy in Astana.; Kyrgyzstan is represented in Georgia by its embassy in Baku.; Both countries are full members of the Organization for Security and Co-operation in Europe.
Malaysia	7 May 1993	See Georgia–Malaysia relations: Georgia has an embassy in Kuala Lumpur.; Malaysia is represented in Georgia through its embassy in Kyiv (Ukraine).; Georgian Ministry of Foreign Affairs about relations with Malaysia
Myanmar	16 August 1999	See Georgia–Myanmar relations
Saudi Arabia		See Georgia–Saudi Arabia relations: Georgia has an embassy in Riyadh.; Saudi Arabia has an embassy in Tbilisi.
South Korea	14 December 1992	See Georgia–South Korea relations The establishment of diplomatic relations between the Republic of Korea and Georgia began on 14 December 1992.: Georgian embassy in Seoul.; South Korean embassy in Tbilisi.; Bilateral Trade in 2014; Exports 143 million US dollars; Imports 19 million US dollars; The number of the South Koreans living in Georgia in 2014 was about 50.; Georgian Ministry of Foreign Affairs about the relations with the Republic of Korea
Syria	18 May 1993 — 5 June 2018	See Georgia–Syria relations Georgia began the procedure of terminating diplomatic relations with Syria due to Damascus' recognition of Abkhazia and South Ossetia.
Taiwan	none	Republic of China passports are not valid for entry in Georgia, while the Taiwanese Ministry of Foreign Affairs declared Georgia as a "non-friendly country" to Taiwan.
Tajikistan	4 August 1994	See Georgia–Tajikistan relations: Georgia is represented in Tajikistan by its embassy in Tashkent.; Tajikistan is represented in Georgia by its embassy in Baku; Both countries are full members of the Organization for Security and Co-operation in Europe.
Turkey	21 May 1992	See Georgia–Turkey relations: Georgia has an embassy in Ankara. and two consulates–general in Istanbul. and Trabzon.; Turkey has an embassy in Tbilisi. and a consulate–general in Batumi.; Both countries are full members of the Council of Europe, the Organization for Security and Co-operation in Europe (OSCE), the Black Sea Naval Co-operation Task Group (BLACKSEAFOR), the Organization of the Black Sea Economic Cooperation (BSEC) and the World Trade Organization (WTO). Turkey is also a member of NATO while Georgia is a candidate.; Turkish Ministry of Foreign Affairs about relations with Georgia
United Arab Emirates	20 October 1992	See Georgia–United Arab Emirates relations: Georgia has an embassy in Abu Dhabi.; United Arab Emirates has an embassy in Tbilisi.

=== Europe ===
Country	Formal Relations Began	Notes
Albania	8 July 1993	See Albania–Georgia relations: Albania is represented in Georgia through a non resident ambassador based in Ankara (Turkey).; Georgia is represented in Albania through a non resident ambassador based in Ankara (Turkey).
Austria	18 January 1993	See Austria–Georgia relations: Austria is represented in Georgia through a non resident ambassador based in Vienna, and through an honorary consulate in Tbilisi.; Georgia has an embassy in Vienna and an honorary consulate in Graz.; Austrian Foreign Ministry: list of bilateral treaties with Georgia (in German only); Georgian Ministry of Foreign Affairs about relations with Austria; Both countries are full members of the Council of Europe.
Belarus	14 July 1992	See Belarus–Georgia relations: Belarus has an embassy in Tbilisi.; Georgia has an embassy in Minsk.
Bulgaria	5 June 1992	See Bulgaria–Georgia relations: Bulgaria recognized the independence of Georgia on 15 January 1992.; Bulgaria has an embassy in Tbilisi.; Georgia has an embassy in Sofia.; Both countries are full members of the Council of Europe.; Georgian Ministry of Foreign Affairs about the relations with Bulgaria
Croatia		See Croatia–Georgia relations: Croatia is accredited to Georgia from its embassy in Baku, Azerbaijan.; Georgia has an embassy in Zagreb.; Both countries are full members of the Council of Europe.
Cyprus	9 July 1993	See Cyprus–Georgia relations: Cyprus is represented in Georgia through a non resident ambassador based in Athens (Greece).; Georgia has an embassy in Nicosia.; Both countries are full members of the Council of Europe.
Denmark	1 July 1992	See Denmark–Georgia relations: Denmark has an embassy in Tbilisi.; Georgia has an embassy in Copenhagen.; Both countries are full members of the Council of Europe.
Estonia		See Estonia–Georgia relations
Finland		See Finland–Georgia relations
France	21 August 1992	See France–Georgia relations: France has an embassy in Tbilisi.; Georgia has an embassy in Paris.; Both countries are full members of the Council of Europe.
Germany	13 April 1992	See Georgia–Germany relations: Germany recognized the independence of Georgia on 22 March 1992.; Georgia has an embassy in Berlin.; Germany has an embassy in Tbilisi.; Georgian Ministry of Foreign Affairs about relations with Germany; German Federal Foreign Office about relations with Georgia
Greece	20 April 1992	See Georgia–Greece relations: Georgia has an embassy in Athens.; Greece has an embassy in Tbilisi.; Both countries are full members of the Council of Europe.; Georgia Ministry of Foreign Affaires about the relation with Greece; Greek Ministry of Foreign Affaires about the relation with Georgia
Hungary	14 May 1992	See Georgia–Hungary relations: Georgia has an embassy in Budapest.; Hungary has an embassy and an honorary consulate in Tbilisi.; Georgian Ministry of Foreign Affairs about the relation with Hungary
Iceland	21 September 1992	See Georgia–Iceland relations Both countries established diplomatic relations on 21 September 1992.
Italy	11 May 1992	See Georgia–Italy relations: Georgia has an embassy in Rome.; Italy has an embassy in Tbilisi.; Both countries are full members of the Council of Europe.
Latvia	11 March 1993	See Georgia–Latvia relations: Georgia has an embassy in Riga.; Latvia has an embassy and an honorary consulate in Tbilisi.; Georgian Ministry of Foreign Affairs about relations with Latvia; Latvian Ministry of Foreign Affairs about relations with Georgia
Liechtenstein	10 June 1992	See Georgia–Liechtenstein relations
Lithuania	16 September 1994	See Georgia–Lithuania relations: Georgia has an embassy in Vilnius.; Lithuania has an embassy in Tbilisi.; Georgian Ministry of Foreign Affairs about relations with Lithuania; Lithuanian Ministry of Foreign affairs: list of bilateral treaties with Poland (in Lithuanian only)
Luxembourg	23 June 1992	See Georgia–Luxembourg relations
Malta	1 February 1993	See Georgia–Malta relations
Moldova	25 June 1992	See Georgia–Moldova relations: Georgia is represented in Moldova through its embassy in Bucharest (Romania).; Moldova is represented in Georgia through its embassy in Baku (Azerbaijan).; Georgian Ministry of Foreign Affairs about relations with Moldova
Monaco	2 March 2009	See Georgia–Monaco relations
Montenegro	29 October 2007	See Georgia–Montenegro relations
Netherlands	22 April 1992	See Georgia–Netherlands relations: Georgia has an embassy in The Hague.; the Netherlands has an embassy in Tbilisi.; Both countries are full members of the Council of Europe.
Norway	5 June 1992	See Georgia–Norway relations
Poland	28 April 1992	See Georgia–Poland relations: Georgia has an embassy in Warsaw.; Poland has an embassy in Tbilisi.; Both countries are full members of the Council of Europe.
Portugal		See Georgia–Portugal relations: Georgia has an embassy in Lisbon.; Portugal is accredited to Georgia from its embassy in Ankara, Turkey.; Both countries are full members of the Council of Europe.
Romania	25 June 1992	See Georgia–Romania relations: Georgia has an embassy in Bucharest and Romania has an embassy in Tbilisi.; Both countries are full members of the Organization of the Black Sea Economic Cooperation, the Black Sea Forum for Partnership and Dialogue, and the Community of Democratic Choice.; Georgian Ministry of Foreign Affairs about the relations with Romania
Russia	1 July 1992—2 September 2008	See Georgia–Russia relations On 29 August 2008, in the aftermath of the 2008 South Ossetia war, Deputy Foreign Minister Grigol Vashadze announced that Georgia had broken diplomatic relations with Russia. He also said that Russian diplomats must leave Georgia, and that no Georgian diplomat would remain in Russia, while only consular relations would be maintained. Russian foreign ministry spokesman Andrei Nesterenko said that Russia regretted this step.
Serbia	26 June 1995	See Georgia–Serbia relations: Georgia is represented in Serbia through its embassy in Athens (Greece).; Serbia is represented in Georgia through its embassy in Moscow (Russia). Serbia plans to open its embassy in Georgia.; Georgia recognizes Serbia on the issue of Kosovo; Serbia recognizes Georgia's territorial integrity regarding South Ossetia and Abkhazia; Georgian Ministry of Foreign Affairs about relations with Serbia
Slovenia	13 January 1993	See Georgia–Slovenia relations
Spain	9 July 1992	See Georgia–Spain relations: Georgia has an embassy in Madrid.; Spain is accredited to Georgia from its embassy in Ankara, Turkey.; Both countries are full members of the Council of Europe.
Sweden	19 September 1992	See Georgia–Sweden relations: Georgia has an embassy in Stockholm.; Sweden has an embassy in Tbilisi.; After the war, when Abkhazia and South Ossetia broke away from Georgia, Georgia and Sweden both did not recognize the independence of both states. There were protests near the Russian embassy in Stockholm, as the war was going on 12 August 2008. The protests was held by a group of Georgians and Swedes.; Both countries are full members of the Council of Europe.
Switzerland	10 June 1992	See Georgia–Switzerland relations: Switzerland maintained a consulate in Tbilisi between 1883 and 1922.; Switzerland recognized Georgia as an independent state on 23 December 1991.; In 1996, Switzerland opened a cooperation office in Tbilisi. Since June 2001, Switzerland has an embassy in Tbilisi.; Both countries are full members of the Council of Europe.; In 1997, Georgia's Permanent Mission to the international organizations in Geneva was also accredited in Bern.; Georgian Ministry of Foreign Affairs about the relations with Switzerland; Swiss Federal Department of Foreign Affairs about the relations with Georgia
Ukraine	22 July 1992	See Georgia–Ukraine relations Relations between Georgia and Ukraine and between the Georgian and Ukrainian people in particular last from the Middle Ages.
United Kingdom	27 April 1992	See Georgia–United Kingdom relations Georgia established diplomatic relations with the United Kingdom on 27 April 1992.: Georgia maintains an embassy in London.; The United Kingdom is accredited to Georgia through its embassy in Tbilisi.; Both countries share common membership of the Council of Europe, the International Criminal Court, OSCE, and the World Trade Organization. Bilaterally the two countries have and an Investment Agreement, and a Strategic Partnership and Cooperation Agreement.
Vatican City	5 May 1992	See Georgia–Holy See relations: Georgia has an embassy in Rome.; Vatican has an Apostolic Nunciature in Tbilisi.

=== Oceania ===
Country	Formal Relations Began	Notes
Australia	16 July 1992	See Australia–Georgia relations: Australia is accredited to Georgia from its embassy in Ankara, Turkey.; Georgia has an embassy in Canberra.
Fiji	29 March 2010	See Fiji–Georgia relations: Both countries established diplomatic relations on 29 March 2010.; Fiji is represented in Georgia by its embassy in Brussels, Belgium.; Georgia is represented in Fiji by its embassy in Canberra, Australia.
Kiribati	28 September 2012	While their ties have been limited, Kiribati's President Anote Tong met with Georgian Foreign Affairs Minister Maia Panjikidze in September 2013 on the sidelines of the UN General Assembly. Kiribati has been a steadfast supporter of Georgia's territorial integrity since then, despite Russia's attempts to lobby Pacific states like Nauru, Tuvalu and Vanuatu to recognize the independence of Abkhazia and South Ossetia. In 2018, Kiribati was one of the nations to vote in favor of the Georgia-sponsored UN resolutions calling for the return of internally displaced persons from Abkhazia and South Ossetia. Georgia is represented in Kiribati via its embassy in Canberra, Australia.
Tuvalu	4 February 2011 —16 February 2012; 31 March 2014	On 16 February 2012 Georgia issued a presidential order ending diplomatic relations with Tuvalu. This comes in response to a visit by the Prime Minister of Tuvalu, Willy Telavi, to Abkhazia and South Ossetia in September 2011, where he announced that the Pacific nation would recognise the two states. However, the Prime Minister of Tuvalu, Enele Sopoaga retracted the recognition of Abkhazia and South Ossetia on 31 March 2014 when Tuvalu's Foreign Minister Taukelina Finikaso signed an agreement to establish diplomatic relations with Georgia. Tuvalu's Foreign Minister said that his country supports Georgia's territorial integrity in its international recognized borders.

== Overview ==
Georgia has established relations with 187 countries and the Sovereign Military Order of Malta. Georgia has terminated its diplomatic relations with Russia, Nicaragua and Syria.

Georgia has not yet established diplomatic relations with:

- Venezuela
- Bhutan, Cook Islands, Niue
- Sahrawi Arab Democratic Republic and the rest of states with limited recognition.

== See also ==
- Ministry of Foreign Affairs of Georgia
- List of diplomatic missions in Georgia
- List of diplomatic missions of Georgia
- Accession of Georgia to the European Union
- Georgia–European Union relations
- Georgia–NATO relations
- EU Neighbourhood Info Centre: Country profile of Georgia
