= 2023–2024 Georgian protests =

Protests against the "Law on Transparency of Foreign Influence"

- Part of democratic backsliding in Georgia
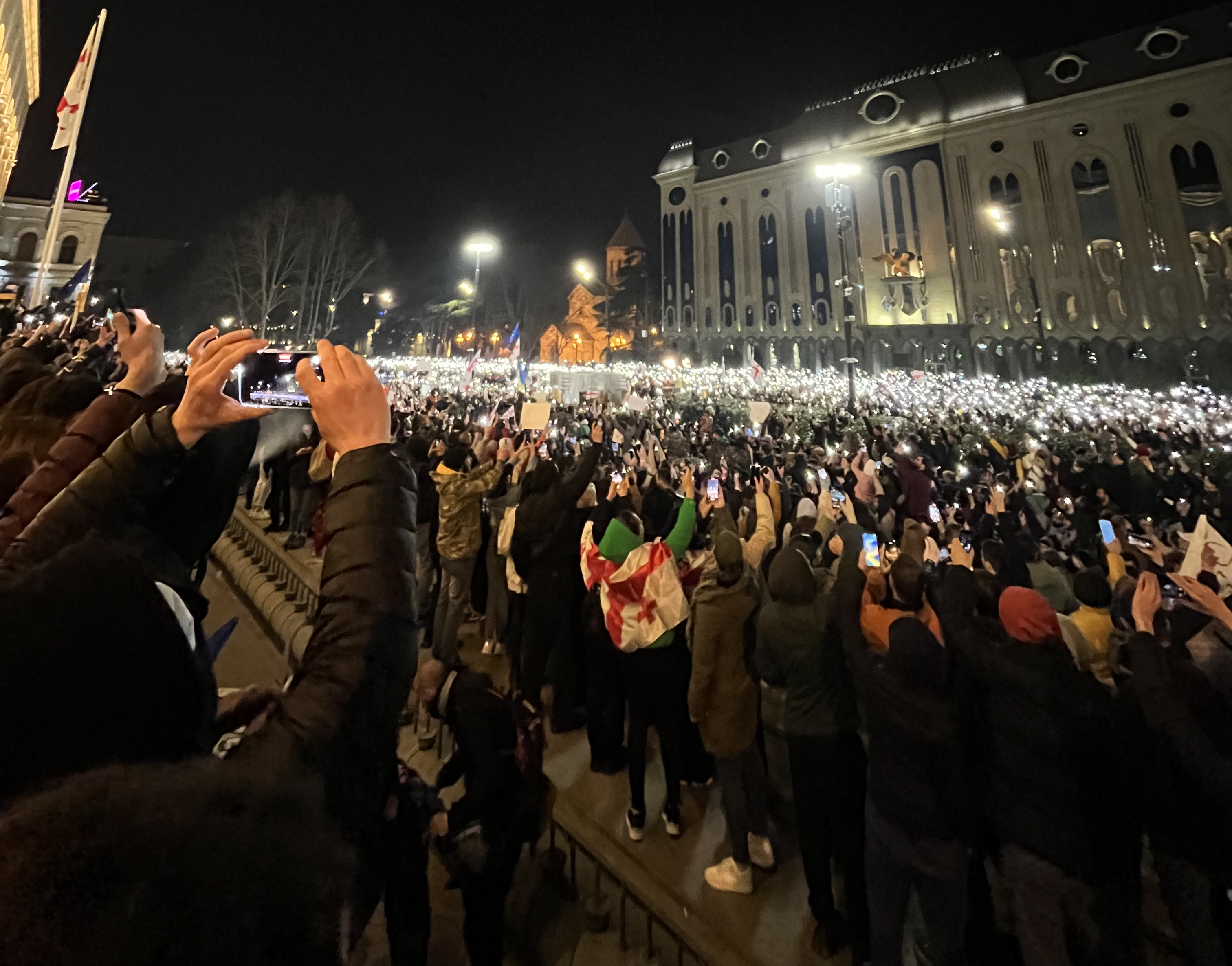
- Protesters in Tbilisi on 8 March 2023
- Date: 6–10 March 2023 (first round); 15 April – 5 June 2024 (second round)
- Location: Georgia
- Caused by: Proposed Law on Transparency of Foreign Influence
- Goals: Stopping the enactment of the proposed bill
- Result: Protest failure: Foreign influence law passed by Parliament

Parties
Opposition: United National Movement; Ahali; Girchi — More Freedom; Droa; For Georgia; Lelo; Strategy Aghmashenebeli; Girchi; European Georgia; Citizens; For the People; Republican Party; Georgian Labour Party; Various groups of students and civil activists; Supported by: President of Georgia	Government of Georgia; Ministry of Internal Affairs; Police of Georgia; State Security Service; Parliamentary majority: Georgian Dream; People's Power

Lead figures
Giorgi Vashadze; Zurab Japaridze; Elene Khoshtaria; Aleko Elisashvili; Nika Gvaramia; Salome Zourabichvili	Irakli Garibashvili; Irakli Kobakhidze; Bidzina Ivanishvili; Mamuka Mdinaradze; Vakhtang Gomelauri; Grigol Liluashvili; Zviad "Khareba" Kharazishvili

Number
2024: At least 169,000 protesters gathered, with some reports suggesting that the numbers peaked at up to 200,000 or even 300,000	The number of law enforcement officers remains unclear

Casualties and losses
2023: Unspecified; Some were injured 135 protesters arrested 15 April – 15 May 2024: 185 arrested 17 injured	2023: 58 officers injured; "several hospitalized" 15 April – 15 May 2024: 14 officers injured

In 2023 and 2024, a series of street demonstrations took place throughout Georgia largely in opposition to the proposed "Law on Transparency of Foreign Influence", which would require non-governmental organizations (NGOs) to register as foreign agents or "organizations carrying the interests of a foreign power" and disclose the sources of their income if the funds they receive from abroad amount to more than 20% of their total revenue.

The central objection of the protesters was that the law would restrict the Western funding to the non-governmental organizations in Georgia and "alienate" Georgia from the "Western allies". Other critics, including the European Union and other Western countries, stated that the law would stifle civil society and freedom of press in Georgia. They called the law "Russian-style" and "authoritarian". In October 2024, NGOs and media organisations lodged a legal case against the law in the European Court of Human Rights, arguing that the law violates six articles of the European Convention on Human Rights. Proponents of the law criticized the unrestricted foreign funding of the local non-governmental organizations, saying that the law would protect the country's sovereignty and promote transparency and accountability of foreign influence. They also said that the law would apply to both the Russian and Western funding, and have criticized the foreign interference in the internal affairs of Georgia.

== Background ==
=== Political context ===
As of January 2021, Georgia and Ukraine were preparing to formally apply for EU membership in 2024 to join the European Union in the 2030s. Amid the 2022 escalation of the Russo-Ukrainian War, Ukraine, Georgia, and Moldova jointly applied for EU membership in February and March 2022. On 23 June 2022, the European Council granted Ukraine and Moldova the status of a candidate for accession to the European Union. It deferred candidate status for Georgia until certain conditions were met. The European Council expressed readiness to grant Georgia the status of a candidate for accession to the European Union after a set of recommended reforms.

The European Parliament adopted three non-binding resolutions criticizing Georgia. On 9 June 2022, the European Parliament issued a six-page resolution accusing the government of Georgia of eroding press freedom in the country. It also recommended the European Council to sanction the founder of the ruling Georgian Dream party Bidzina Ivanishvili for "his role in the deterioration of the political process in Georgia".

On 14 December 2022, the European Parliament again called the European Council to sanction Ivanishvili, accusing him of deteriorating the democratic political process in Georgia, while also calling the Georgian government to immediately release the imprisoned former president Mikheil Saakashvili on medical grounds to be treated in a special institution abroad.

After the end of his presidency and his departure from Georgia, Saakashvili was sentenced in absentia in 2018 by the Tbilisi City Court for abuse of power, embezzlement and his implication in the beating of opposition MP Valery Gelashvili. A day prior to the October 2021 local elections, Saakashvili arrived clandestinely in Georgia from Ukraine, calling his supporters to gather in the capital after the elections, where he would join them. However, the same day his location was revealed by the police and he was arrested. In detention he began a hunger strike that lasted for 50 days, causing his health to deteriorate.

The third resolution of the European Parliament irking Georgian Dream was passed on 14 February 2023, in which the Georgian government and Bidzina Ivanishvili were accused of mistreating Saakashvili in prison, once again calling for his release from prison and personal sanctions on Ivanishvili. The Georgian Dream party criticized the resolutions. Prime Minister Irakli Garibashvili called them "irresponsible and offensive towards our people". Georgian Dream parliamentarian Dimitri Khundadze questioned Georgia's policy of EU membership, saying, "We won't give up our dignity to get [candidate] status! [...] No one will intimidate Bidzina Ivanishvili or the Georgian state with threats of sanctions!".

Following the EU's decision to set twelve conditions for Georgia in order to obtain the candidate status, a series of protests was organized in June–July 2022 by the non-governmental organization (NGO) Shame Movement. The organizers blamed the Georgian government for the failure to secure EU candidate status for the country and called for its resignation, to be replaced with a technical interim government of "national accord" to implement the conditions set by the EU in order to get candidate status. The opposition welcomed this proposal, while Speaker of Parliament Shalva Papuashvili criticised the demand, saying "democracy does not work this way". He elaborated that the formation of a technical government was "nothing but a desire to seize power by bypassing democratic procedures".

On 2 August 2022, MPs Sozar Subari, Mikheil Kavelashvili, Dimitri Khundadze and Guram Macharashvili left ruling Georgian Dream and established the People's Power movement. In October 2022 another five Georgian Dream MPs joined the movement, depriving the ruling party of its parliamentary majority. At the same time the People's Power faction in parliament supported the government led by prime minister Irakli Garibashvili. Georgian Dream chairperson Irakli Kobakhidze pledged to cooperate with People's Power on key issues.

According to People's Power, their goal was to speak up and expose the truth "hidden behind the scenes of Georgian politics". The group published a number of public letters accusing the United States and European Union of trying to overthrow the Georgian government. It questioned American funding to Georgia, saying that the funding was largely directed to NGOs to promote American agenda under the guise of "strengthening democracy", while this practice was actually contradicting the principles of democracy and popular sovereignty. People's Power described a number of Georgian NGOs and political parties, including the Mikheil Saakashvili's United National Movement, as "American agents", while accusing EU and USA of trying to blackmail Georgia with the EU candidate status to free Saakashvili after a failed coup attempt.

The People's Power movement also accused the US and EU of interfering in the country's internal affairs by undermining the Georgian judiciary. Judicial reforms were among the twelve conditions set by the EU for Georgia to get the candidate status, although according to People's Power, the proposal was aimed at "subjugating the Georgian judiciary to foreign control". In September 2022, the ruling Georgian Dream party contested the credibility of influential NGOs such as Transparency International and ISFED, saying that they aligned with the opposition and violated the political neutrality by demanding the formation of technical government, with the chairman of ruling party Irakli Kobakhidze questioning the transparency of their foreign funding.

On 29 December 2022, the People's Power movement expressed its intention to draft a foreign agent law to curb the alleged foreign influence in the country. On 15 February 2023, the draft "Law On Transparency of Foreign Influence" was submitted to Georgian Parliament.

=== Foreign agent bill ===
Under the bill, non-commercial legal entities (the most common form of NGO in Georgia), broadcasters, legal entities that alone or jointly own a print media outlet operating in Georgia, and legal entities that own or use, jointly or with others, an internet domain and/or internet hosting intended for the dissemination of information through the internet in the Georgian language, must register as "agents of foreign influence". All such publicly registered organizations are subject to monitoring by the Ministry of Justice if they receive more than 20% of their annual income from "a foreign power". The draft law requires NGOs to disclose the source of their funds but does not imposes any restriction on their activities. The Georgian Dream supported the bill, saying that it would promote the financial transparency of foreign-funded NGOs.

Georgian Dream and People's Power movement claimed the bill was based on the "American model", referring to the Foreign Agents Registration Act in the United States. However, this comparison was dismissed as incorrect. The fundamental difference between the laws is that the US law does not target NGOs, but individuals who are employed by foreign governments. Responding to the criticism, on 21 February 2023 the People's Power registered alternative bill 'On the Registration of Foreign Agents Act', a verbatim translation of the US Foreign Agents Registration Act.

Georgian civil society organizations objected to the bill as a violation of fundamental human rights such as freedom of press. The bill represented an authoritarian shift and could have hurt Georgia's hopes of European Union membership, critics said. More than 60 civil society organizations and media outlets announced they would not comply with the bill if it is signed into law.

Georgian Dream chair and MP Irakli Kobakhidze stated in February 2023 that Parliament would send the bill to the Venice Commission of the Council of Europe, expressing confidence the commission would have a positive assessment of the law.

One version of the law became effective on 1 August 2024. On 17 October 2024, a legal case against the bill was lodged in the European Court of Human Rights (ECtHR) by 16 media organisations, 120 NGOs and four individuals, arguing that the law violates several articles of the European Convention on Human Rights (ECHR): Article 8 on privacy, Article 10 on freedom of expression, Article 11 on freedom of assembly and association, Article 13 on the right to an effective remedy for rights violations, Article 14 on discrimination, and Article 18 on limits on state restrictions of rights. A later version of the bill took formal effect as a law on 31 May 2025. The ECtHR declared the case to be admissible for all six ECHR articles of the application. In September 2025, the NGOs and media organisations submitted updated documentation to the ECtHR about effects of the foreign agents law, which Rights Georgia refers to as the "Russian Law".

== Protests ==
=== 2023 ===
On 6 March 2023, a fight broke out between parliamentary deputies of the ruling coalition and the opposition during the Legal Affairs Committee hearing on the draft laws. Deputies from the National Movement and Strategy Aghmashenebeli opposition parties were expelled from the chamber to restore the order. The protests were held in front of the Parliament building calling the deputies to vote down the bills.

On 7 March 2023, the parliament adopted a proposed "Law On Transparency of Foreign Influence" in the first reading, with 76 votes to 13. The protests were organized in front of the Parliament of Georgia, which later turned violent as the protesters tried to storm the building and threw Molotov cocktails at police. Police officers responded by using tear gas and water cannons to disperse the protesters and restore the order. Georgia's Interior Ministry asked protesters to disperse, warning that "legal measures" would be taken to restore calm. The ministry reportedly said the protest went beyond the framework of a peaceful assembly and turned into violence. The ministry also said that police were also forced to use proportional force to restore public order.

Georgian Prime Minister Irakli Garibashvili reaffirmed his support for the law, saying the proposed provisions on foreign agents met "European and global standards". Meanwhile, President of Georgia Salome Zourabichvili, threw her support behind the protesters, saying "the path of European integration must be protected". She has said she would veto and repeal the bill.

On 8 March 2023, tens of thousands of people protested in front of the parliament building, calling the parliament to suspend further discussions on the foreign agents law. Strategy Aghmashenebeli leader Giorgi Vashadze presented an ultimatum to parliament: reject the bills and release everyone who was detained on 7 March.

On 9 March 2023, the ruling coalition announced that they would retract the bills. They said that more discussions with the public were required to convince the society of the importance of the legislation. The Interior Ministry announced later that day that everyone arrested on administrative charges on 7 and 8 March have been released.

On 10 March 2023, one of the two bills was withdrawn by the ruling coalition, while the other was defeated in a formal second sitting vote in Parliament, with one vote in favour, 36 votes against, and 76 abstentions.

=== 2024 ===
==== April ====
On 3 April 2024, the Georgian Dream (GD) party announced plans to bring back the bill, with a term "foreign agent" replaced with "organization carrying the interests of a foreign power". The leader of parliamentary majority Mamuka Mdinaradze said that the reason for reintroduction of the bill was the continued circulation of slush funds, he also said that the bill would target all foreign sources, including Russian. On 8 April, the Bureau of Parliament of Georgia registered the bill for the parliamentary discussions.

More than 400 NGOs issued a joint statement against the bill. On 5 April, seven opposition parties – Ahali, Girchi — More Freedom, Droa, United National Movement, Lelo for Georgia, Republican Party of Georgia, and Strategy Aghmashenebeli – said they would coordinate parliamentary opposition to the bill. NATO Secretary General Jens Stoltenberg, European Union Spokesperson for External Affairs Peter Stano, German Foreign Office Spokesperson Sebastian Fischer and others voiced their opposition to the bill.

The United States State Department spokesman Matthew Miller said to "stay tuned" as to possible sanctions against Georgian MPs who pass the law.

The United States ambassador said that Georgia "does not need this law".

President Salome Zurabishvili again announced her opposition to the bill. She said she would veto the bill and pardoned Lazare Grigoriadis, an activist who had been imprisoned last year for allegedly throwing a Molotov cocktail at the police officers during the protests.

Georgia's new Prime Minister Irakli Kobakhidze slammed the "foreign diktat" and challenged foreign ambassadors for TV debate. He said that the ambassadors "are trying to assume the functions of the legislator, participate in the legislative process and dictate to the supreme body of the representative democracy which laws it should pass or not".

The protests against the bill began in front of the Parliament building on 15 April. The same day, during the discussion of the bill at the Legal Affairs Committee, the opposition MP from Citizens party, Aleko Elisashvili, physically assaulted MP Mdinaradze. The protesters demanded the Committee not to approve the bill. The Interior Ministry urged the protesters not to exceed the boundaries of the freedom of speech established by the law. The police and the protesters clashed near the Parliament building, which led to the 14 protesters being arrested.

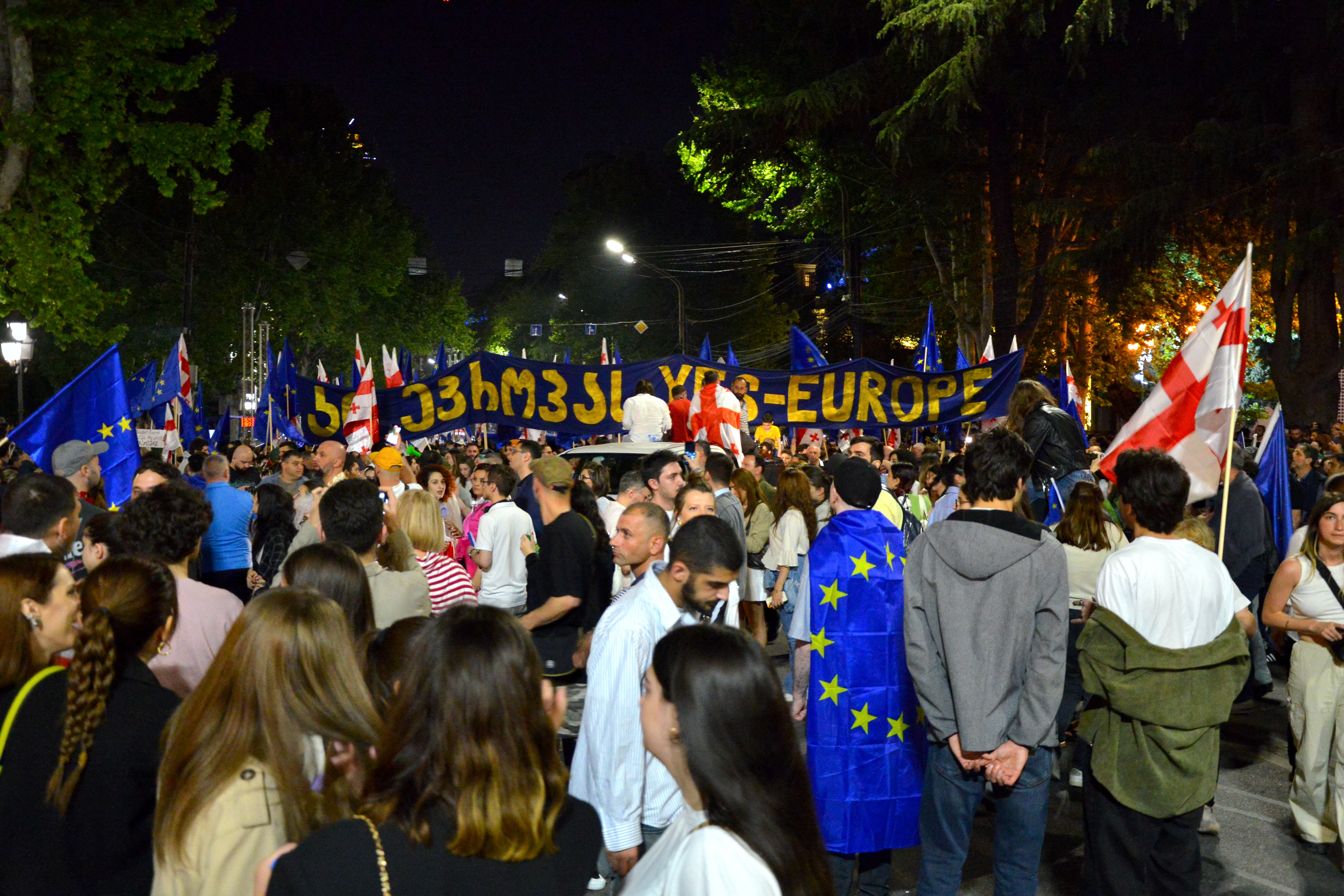
A banner reads "Yes to Europe" in bold letters

The bill was approved by the committee and handed for the discussions to the Parliament. On 16 April 2024, the Parliament voted 78 to 25 on a draft bill. The protesters threw blunt objects at the police, with four police officers being injured. The police using pepper spray to prevent further physical confrontation.

On 17 April, approximately 35,000 protesters went on the streets of Tbilisi and blocked roads in front of the Georgian Parliament Building, there were also hundreds of riot police in the area to make arrests. The police reportedly found cold weapons on one of the protesters they arrested. Georgia's prime minister Irakli Kobakhidze gave a press conference where he denounced the protesters as forces that "undermine Georgia's peace and stability". He also stated that CSOs attempted to “organize a revolution” from 2020 to 2022, "attack and discredit the Georgian Orthodox Church", spread "LGBT propaganda" and initiate direct armed conflict with Russia as a "second front" in the Russo-Ukrainian War. He also denounced President Zurabishvili as an "agent of the Global Party of War" that was trying to "Ukrainize" Georgia. Kobakhidze stated that the bill was necessary to prevent the war propaganda in the country, saying that the NGOs joined the Ukrainian officials in calling Georgia to start a war against Russia, referring to the statement made by the Secretary of the National Security Council of Ukraine Oleksiy Danilov, who had called Georgia to start a war against Russia by saying that Georgia would have "greatly aided" Ukraine by opening a "second front" against Russia. Kobakhidze also denounced German Chancellor Olaf Scholz and NATO Secretary General Jens Stoltenberg for their criticism of the bill as "unfounded".

Speaker of Georgian parliament Shalva Papuashvili said that the NGOs funded by Denmark and the Netherlands have given the Georgian parliament an ultimatum, urging the embassies of Denmark and the Netherlands to clarify their positions, saying "I believe these embassies should state their position regarding the purpose of financing this NGO. Is it presenting ultimatums to the representative body of the Georgian people, dictating which laws to adopt and which not to?". He also said that such ultimatums were potentially inciting violence and threatening to turn peaceful protests into violent ones.

The protesters marched towards the Atoneli Presidential Palace on 20 April to meet President Salome Zourabichvili and express support on her stance over vetoing the Transparency bill and pardoning Lazare Grigoriadis. The next day, protesters gathered in front of the Parliament building and blocked the Rustaveli Avenue, demanding the Parliament to retract the proposed bill.

The European Parliament held a debate on the proposed legislation in Georgia. MEP Miriam Lexmann said that the bill would undermine "the work of civil society and independent media", calling the European Council to impose sanctions on Bidzina Ivanishvili, the leader of the ruling party. She said that the European Union should "freeze the opening of any accession negotiations with Georgia" and make financial assistance to Georgia conditional on scrapping the legislation. MEP Mick Wallace instead condemned the EU and the US for using "our money" for setting up "parallel publics in non-EU countries like Georgia", saying that NGOs cared not about democracy but about money, adding that "unelected NGO representatives" serve "the strategic aims of the foreign paymasters".

Archbishop of the Georgian Orthodox Church Zenon Iarajuli of the Dmanisi and Agarak-Tashiri Eparchy denounced the bill, claiming it "threatens to stigmatize individuals and organizations", is non-Christian and "a violation of the Constitution". He also claimed that the bill would classify the Church as a "foreign agent", although the bill contains exemptions for organizations engaged in religious and many other activities.

The Georgian Parliament also held a debate on the bill where various GD MPs stated that not passing the bill would destroy Georgian identity and statehood while the opposition called it a Russophilic plot by Bidzina Ivanishvili. By this point, voices within the opposition movement have suggested an armed struggle against the GD, which U.S. State Department spokesmen Vedant Patel denounced, calling for the protests to remain peaceful.

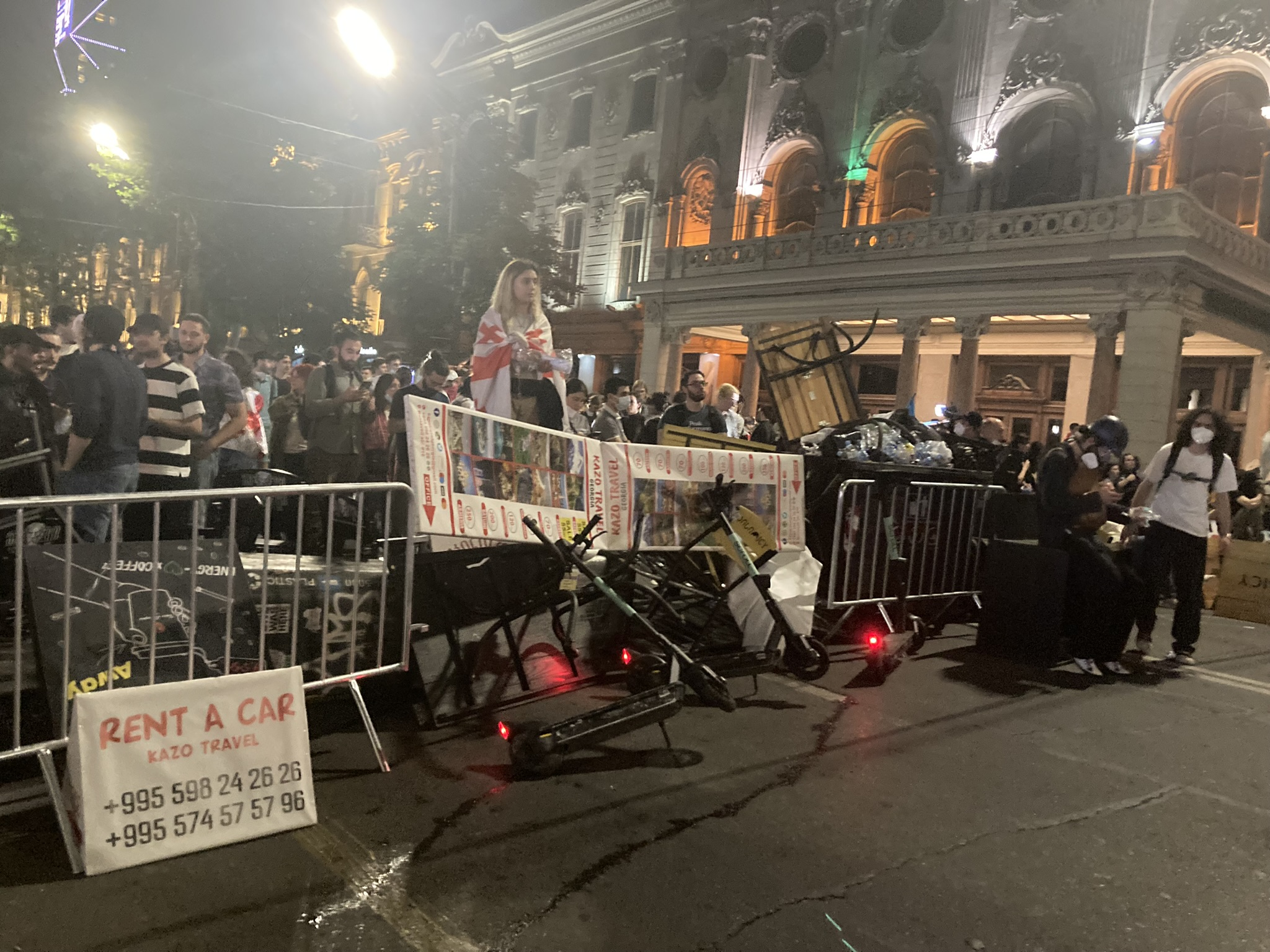
Protesters erected barricades to block the streets

On 25 April, the European Parliament issued a resolution with 425 votes in favor, 25 against, and 30 abstentions, condemning the Georgian foreign agents bill and freezing all Georgian ascension talks until the bill is dropped. The resolution also stated that the bill is in direct opposition to the Copenhagen criteria, and if it were to pass Georgia would fundamentally be ineligible for EU membership.

In response to an EU resolution that condemned the foreign agents bill stating that if it were to be passed it would make Georgia ineligible for EU membership, Shalva Papuashvili, the GD speaker of parliament called the resolution a "political statement" and a "scrap of paper" that has no legal force and "no value for our country", saying that the Georgia's desire to join the EU was used by the several MEPs as a tool for their own political agenda. Mamuka Mdinaradze, the GD majority leader called the resolution "another hoax and plain blackmail" and as "absolutely immoral and categorically unacceptable". Kakha Kaladze, the GD Secretary General called the resolution "trash" and "shameful" with the sole purpose "to agitate people, confuse our society, and incite the spark of protest". Meanwhile, Giorgi Vashadze, MP for Strategy Aghmashenebeli stated that the EP resolution made it clear that the GD "chose a path which is not the choice of the Georgian people, that you went against the will of the citizens of Georgia". Levan Khabeishvili, Chairman of the UNM called for all Georgians to "engage in combat against the Russian law, against this government". Mamuka Khazaradze, MP for Lelo for Georgia called for "Mobilization of all forces" to defeat the bill. Later that night over 100 CSOs adopted resolutions stating that even if the bill were to pass they would refuse to cooperate with the government, refuse to join a registry, and refuse to report information to the government.

On 26 April, a member of the Telavi City Council for GD, Levan Berdzenashvili, spoke out against the foreign agents law stating that if the law is passed Georgia will "lose everything that has to do with Europe" and called on fellow members of the party to "vote their conscience" and defeat the bill in parliament. That same day Tbilisi City Court Judge Koba Chagunava ordered members of the opposition who were protesting against the bill to pay a fine for "disobedience to the lawful request of a police officer" and petty hooliganism.

MEP Katarína Roth Neveďalová stated that lately the EP often resorted to calling everything they don't like "pro-Russian" or "Russian", and stressed that while MEPs can have their opinions on the bill, in the end "the decision on the adoption of the bill had to be made by the Georgian authorities".

On 28 April 50 to 60 thousand protesters gathered at First Republic Square in Tbilisi and marched to the Georgian parliament, demanding the withdrawal of the bill. The police was deployed to the scene. During the protests Aleksi Petriashvili, a former Free Democrats State Minister in the first Georgian Dream government, was arrested for "petty hooliganism" and "resisting the police".

The Business Association of Georgia (BAG), a CSO and professional society that represents 1200 medium to large business politically, expressed support for the GD government stating that the political instability brought on by the foreign agents bill is bad for business, and that GD should communicate with the public better. It also said it "will not and cannot enter into the substantive discussion of the above-mentioned draft law". Additionally, the Legal Issues Committee of the Parliament held their second hearing of the bill, where committee chairman expelled several opposition MPs due to their detraction from the bill citing violations of the rules of procedure. Committee chairman Anri Okhanashvili would then be denounced in a joint statement by 20 CSOs for "abusing power and restricting the ability of lawmakers". Another joint statement, this time by 60 former Georgian diplomats, including 28 ambassadors and 5 foreign ministers, denounced the GD stating that the party is under total control of Bidzina Ivanishvili, and that "Georgian Dream changed the foreign policy course from the West to Russia".

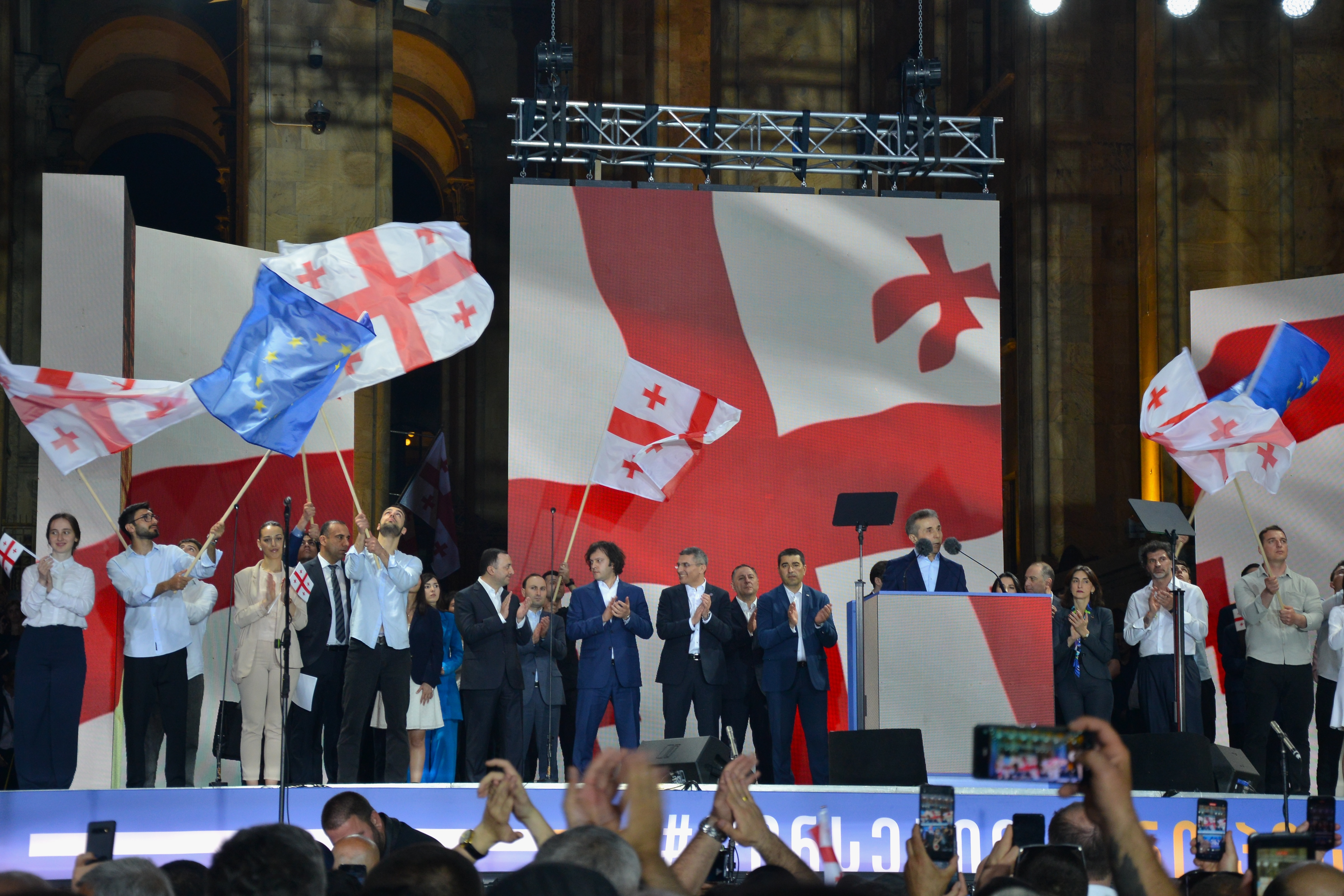
Bidzina Ivanishvili addressing a rally supporting the Georgian Law on Transparency of Foreign Influence, 29 April 2024

The Parliament of Georgia launched a second hearing of the draft law on foreign influence on 29 April. The Legal Committee approved the bill with 2nd reading. On the same day, the ruling Georgian Dream held a public rally in support of the bill. Bidzina Ivanishvili, chairman of the Georgian Dream party, addressed the participants of the rally. He said that the foreign-funded NGOs organized a Rose Revolution in Georgia and that Mikheil Saakashvili's government was appointed from abroad, calling it an "inhumane and sadistic dictatorship" and a "pseudo-elite nurtured by a foreign country". He also said that the "Global War Party" has pushed Georgia into a conflict with Russia in 2008 and Ukraine in 2014–2022. He stated that they wanted to "return their agents" to power to open a second front against Russia in Georgia. He called EP resolution on Georgia an "interference into Georgia's internal affairs" and a work of the "Global War Party", calling it an "aggression" and saying that the "main reason for the Global War Party's aggression towards Georgia is that, despite great efforts, it could not turn Georgia into a 2nd front". He added that they would not succeed because "modern Georgia is neither Shevardnadze's Georgia nor Yanukovich's Ukraine". He also said that in 2012 when Georgian Dream came to power it could not punish the United National Movement for its crimes because of Western support for the UNM and that after 2024 election the UNM would be given "harsh political and legal judgement it deserves for the nine years of bloody rule". Salome Zurabishvili, in an interview with Radio France Internationale, called on the Georgian people to vote out the GD and reaffirm their "European choice" in the 2024 Georgian parliamentary election.

On 30 April, protesters and the police clashed near the entrance of the Parliament building. According to the Ministry of the Internal Affairs, 63 people were arrested on administrative charges of petty hooliganism and disobeying the legal request of the police. According to the Health Ministry, six policemen and five protesters were seriously injured during the clashes. The MIA has launched a criminal investigation of the incident. UNM chairman and MP Levan Khabeishvili was among the ones who received an injury and suffered lacerations to the face, a bruised eye, and a broken nose.

==== May ====
The Parliament of Georgia voted in favor of the bill on its second reading on 1 May, with 83 votes to 23. MP Khabeishvili gave a speech before parliament prior to the vote in a face cast and wheelchair. In his speech Khabeishvili alleged the police sought him out as an opposition member and concluded: "I may not be able to see with my eye, but Georgia will open its eyes and see clearly." Shortly after the vote Khabeishvili posted a video to Facebook urging a continued struggle against Putinists. Simultaneously the protesters outside attempted to break through the closed gates into the yard of the parliament but were beaten back by riot police. According to the Ministry of Health, 15 people were hospitalized, including police. Shortly after the altercation, President Zurabishvili called for calm and for the protests to remain non-violent again urging for the defeat of GD in the polls.

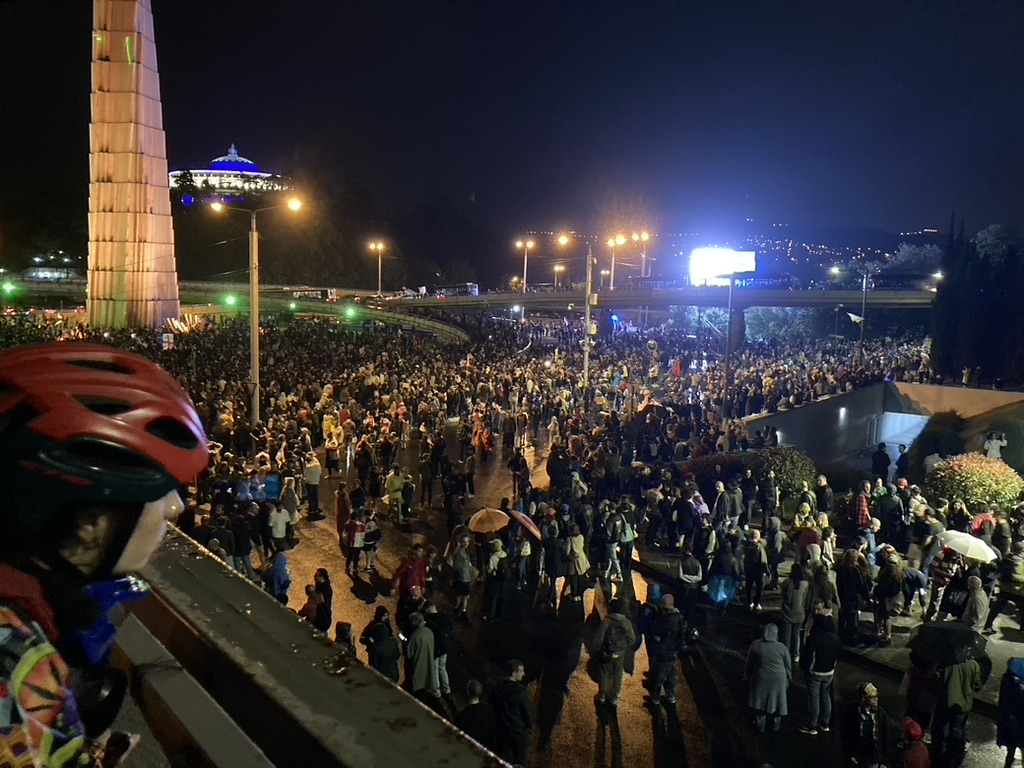
Hundreds of protesters obstructing traffic at Heroes Square

The protests continued the next days, and the Georgian Parliament enforced red level of security on 2 May to ensure the safety amid the clashes and what it called an attack on the Parliament building by the opposition. The same day the protesters besieged the Parliament building and faced off the police stationed inside the parliament's courtyard. The riot police had to use tear gas, water cannons, and pepper spray to disperse the protesters. The next day, the protesters organized a rally at the Paragraph Hotel which was hosting an annual meeting of the Asian Development Bank, during which the one protester was detained for verbally insulting the police, while on 9 May, Tbilisi Police Department reported arresting six people during the clashes a day before.

An estimated 50,000 protesters gathered and marched through the central Tbilisi prior to the beginning of third hearing of the bill, on 11 May. Protesters marched to the capital's Europe Square holding Georgian and European flags, chanting "no to the Russian law". The same day seven opposition parties — Ahali, United National Movement, Lelo, Girchi – More Freedom, Droa and Strategy Builder — issued a joint statement, saying that the bill would be unacceptable no matter how much revised, calling the parliamentary majority to scrap the bill altogether. On 12 May, Protesters said that they would stay overnight as third hearing of the bill in the Legal Affair Committee was scheduled for the next day. The road leading to the Parliament building through the Rustaveli Avenue was blocked.

The Legal Affairs Committee backed the bill in the third reading. Protesters clashed with police at the Parliament's entrance, and twenty were arrested, including two Americans and a Russian.

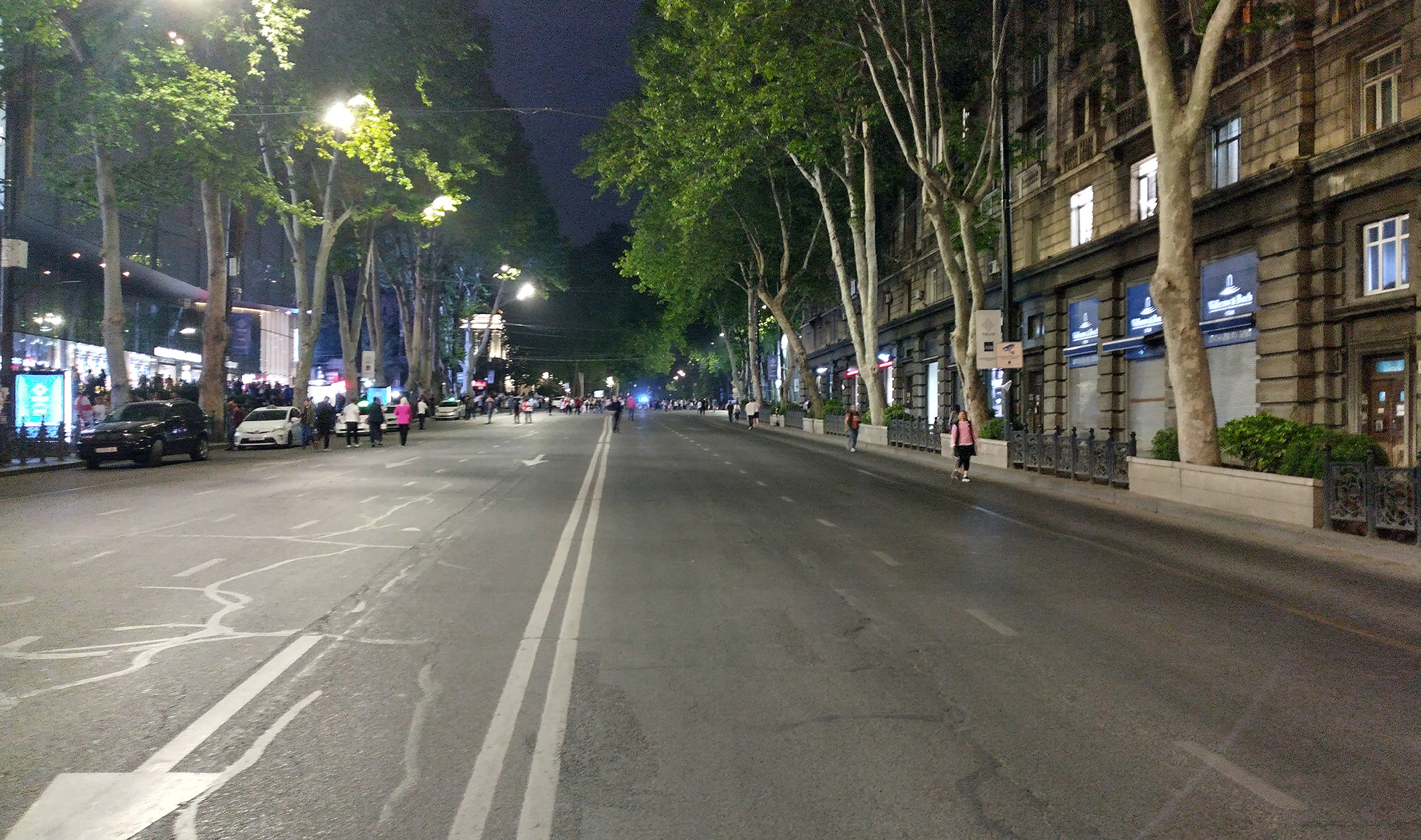
Empty Rustaveli Avenue in Tbilisi during protests

The Parliament passed the draft law with the third reading at the plenary session on 14 May, with 84 votes to 30. At the same time, the protests were held outside the Parliament building, and the deputies brawled inside the Parliament. UNM, Lelo and Strategy Builder announced parliamentary boycott, saying they would no longer participate in parliamentary work. For Georgia party opted not to join boycotting parties, saying that it would continue to fight Georgian Dream government using "all available platforms, whether on the streets or within the parliament". The Parliament of Georgia stated that it would operate under red security level amid tensions. Amid clashes between the protesters and the police, the MIA issued a statement, saying that the protests turned violent and calling the demonstrators to abide by the "norms established by the law". Police arrested 13 people on 14 May. The next day, protesters were joined by the foreign ministers of Latvia, Estonia, Iceland and Lithuania, who arrived to Georgia to hold meetings with President Salome Zourabichvili, Prime Minister Irakli Kobakhidze and others. The Speaker of Georgian Parliament Shalva Papuashvili condemned the participation of the foreign politicians in the protests as an "unfriendly act".

The protesters marched to the Parliament building from different locations on 18 May. The same day, President of Georgia Salome Zourabichvili put a veto on the Transparency Bill.

On 24 May, protesters marched at Freedom Square and Mother's Garden, set to culminate the rally at the Interior Ministry, demanding the immediate release of those arrested during recent protests.

On 28 May, The Parliament voted 84 votes to 4 to override the veto put on the bill by the President. Members of the opposition abstained from the vote. Protesters gathered around the Parliament building to protest the outcome, with many also protesting marching around the Georgian Dream party headquarters.

On 31 May, Lithuanian Ambassador to Georgia, Andrius Kalindra was summoned by the Georgian foreign office over the presence of the country's Foreign Minister at Tbilisi rallies.

==== June ====
The rally-concert was held by the Georgian bands and signers on 2 June with the aim of collecting donations for those arrested and fined at the protests, with the organizers raising US$124 700 by the next day. President Salome Zourabichvili refused to sign the bill into the law, after which it was forwarded to the Speaker of the Georgian Parliament Shalva Papuashvili, who signed the bill into the effect as required by the constitution, with Papuashvili saying: "today, I signed the Law on Transparency of Foreign Influence, the primary objective of which implies the enhancement of the resilience of the political, economic and social systems of Georgia without external interventions". The protesters met in front of the Georgian Parliament on 5 June with a plan of moving towards the Georgian Dream headquarters to protest against the law. On 1 August 2024, the Law of Transparency of Foreign Influence came into effect.

== Reactions ==
=== European Union ===
European Union foreign policy head Josep Borrell said the draft law was a "very bad development" for Georgia and its people, with a "chilling effect on civil society and media organizations". According to him the bill could seriously affect Georgian ties with the EU and he "urged Georgia to uphold its commitment to the promotion of democracy, the rule of law and human rights". The US and the European Union jointly said that it would be hard for Georgia to join NATO or the European Union if the bill became law.

On 17 April 2024, Josep Borrell, the EU High Representative for Foreign Affairs and Security Policy, and Olivér Várhelyi, Commissioner for Neighbourhood and Enlargement, issued a joint statement on the bill, saying that they found it "concerning" that the Georgian Parliament passed the bill "despite repeated calls by the European Union to retract such legislation".

On 27 April 2024, Lithuanian President Gitanas Nausėda said that the bill would "distance [Georgia] from European ideals" and that the European Union "should react on this".

On 11 May, the EU ambassador to Georgia Paweł Herczyński stated that the bill "must not be passed in its current form".

The European Union scrambled to adopt a common position regarding a Georgia draft law. A joint EU27 statement had been negotiated by the EU member states since 13 May, but it ultimately failed to materialise as Hungary and Slovakia blocked the initiative against the bill, objecting on the premise that they "did not think it is right for the EU to interfere in the domestic politics of a third country".

On 13 May 2024, Foreign Affairs Chair of German Parliament Michael Roth urged Georgia to withdraw the bill.

On 15 May, Josep Borrell with the European Commission issued a Statement on the adoption of the bill by Georgian MPs which took place on 14 May. He stated that the EU stands with the Georgian protestors and condemns "the intimidation, threats and physical assaults on civil society representatives, political leaders and journalists, as well as their families" as "unacceptable". He concluded that "the adoption of this law negatively impacts Georgia's progress on the EU path. [...] We urge the Georgian authorities to withdraw the law, uphold their commitment to the EU path and advance the necessary reforms detailed in the 9 steps. The EU stands ready to continue supporting Georgians working towards a European future." On the same day, Ministers of Foreign Affairs of Latvia, Estonia, Iceland and Lithuania arrived to Georgia to hold meetings with Prime Minister Irakli Kobakhidze, President Salome Zourabichvili and others. Afterwards, they arrived to the Rustaveli Avenue to join the protests. Georgia's Minister of Foreign Affairs Ilia Darchiashvili said that participation of foreign ministers in the opposition-organized protests is "unacceptable".

On 18 May, Latvian Foreign Minister Baiba Braže urged Georgia to reconsider its decision to pass the Transparency Law.

=== Georgia ===
In May 2024, the chairman of the Legal Affairs Committee of the Parliament of Georgia, Anri Okhanashvili said that passing the bill is necessary because foreign funding of the organizations is not just "charity", but there are specific purposes and interests behind it, therefore these organizations need to register as "carriers of the interests of a foreign power".

The speaker of the Georgian Parliament Shalva Papuashvili stated that the bill would serve the interests of the Georgian people and that it was natural that the "foreign countries do not have interest in having their influence transparent". He said that the NGOs like National Endowment for Democracy secretly financed the radical opposition groups in Georgia and that the United States and the European Union opposed the bill because they did not want their influence to become transparent, and that they encouraged what he described as a disinformation campaign and hysteria against the proposed law.

==== Abkhazia ====
In 2023, Inal Ardzinba, who is Minister for Foreign Affairs of Abkhazia, a breakaway state internationally recognized as part of Georgia, said that the United States was trying to carry out a coup in Georgia to destabilize the region and launch a "second front" of the Russo-Ukrainian War in the South Caucasus.

=== Russia ===
Maria Zakharova criticized the European Union's position regarding situation in Georgia and accused Josep Borrell of "crossing the limits of decency" and "putting pressure on Georgian citizens".

The Minister for Foreign Affairs of Russia, Sergey Lavrov compared the situation in Georgia to the Euromaidan in Ukraine. The Ministry of Foreign Affairs of the Russian Federation warned Georgians on consequences of such developments.

Russian President Vladimir Putin's press secretary Dmitry Peskov said that Russia had nothing to do with the bill and that it was more similar to the Foreign Agents Registration Act in the United States. He also added that Russia was monitoring the situation and that it was interested that the situation remained peaceful near its border.

The Russian Ministry of Economic Development recommended Russian citizens to refrain from travelling to Georgia.

=== Turkey ===
On 16 May 2024, during the meeting with Georgia's Prime Minister Irakli Kobakhidze, President of Turkey Recep Tayyip Erdoğan discussed the protests in Georgia and said that on behalf of his country he hoped that the situation would be resolved "in best interests of Georgian people".

=== Ukraine ===
In March 2023, Ukrainian President Volodymyr Zelenskyy had said the Georgian people and the protests that took place as a sign of "victory for democracy". As well as a statement on how the Ukrainian people hoped for success in Georgia when it occurred on 7 March, just when the protests had started.

=== China ===
In August 2024, the Chinese Foreign Ministry published a report "The National Endowment for Democracy: What It Is and What It Does", which accused the National Endowment for Democracy (NED) of acting as the US government's "white glove" and engaging in "evil deeds": "subverting state power in other countries, meddling in other countries' internal affairs, inciting division and confrontation, misleading public opinion, and conducting ideological infiltration, all under the pretext of promoting democracy". In the "Inciting division and confrontation to undermine the stability of other countries" chapter, the report accused the NED of funding the local NGOs in Georgia since the beginning of the 21st century to instigate protests. According to the report, this includes rallying support for and instigating the 2024 protests against the foreign agents bill in Georgia.

=== United States ===
Spokesman for the United States Department of State Ned Price criticized the bill and likened it to Hungarian and Russian foreign agent laws. The US Embassy in Georgia said the bill was Kremlin-inspired and was incompatible with the people of Georgia's clear desire for European integration and democratic development. The statement said the law would damage Georgia's relations with its strategic partners.

Ned Price supported the 2023 protests and said that "the United States has tools to hold accountable those who contradict the will of Georgian people", hinting at potential sanctions on Georgian officials, in a question time on 7 March. Assistant Secretary of State Todd Robinson, former ambassador to Venezuela, heavily criticized the legislation from Tbilisi, where he arrived 1 day before the protests erupted for a "women in policing" event, calling it "a law based on Russia's interest, not Georgia's interest".

On 26 April 2024, Deputy Spokesperson of US State Departament Vedant Patel said that the State Department found Georgian Transparency bill to be "incredibly troubling".

On 27 April, U.S. Senators Jim Risch (R-ID), ranking member of the Senate Foreign Relations Committee, and Jeanne Shaheen (D-NH), Chair of the Europe and Regional Security Cooperation Subcommittee, co-wrote a bipartisan letter signed by 12 of their colleagues (Note: Other senators include: Ben Cardin (D-MD), Lindsey Graham (R-SC), Chris Coons (D-DE), Pete Ricketts (R-NE), Dick Durbin (D-IL), Roger Wicker (R-MS), Richard Blumenthal (D-CT), Thom Tillis (R-NC), Tim Kaine (D-VA), Dan Sullivan (R-AL), Sheldon Whitehouse (D-RI), and Martin Heinrich (D-NM)) expressing "profound concern" about the foreign agents bill, warning that its passage would mark "a shift in U.S. policy toward Georgia". The letter called CSOs the "lifeblood of Georgian democracy" that have invested million of dollars "to support Georgia's sovereignty and democratic transition" and that if the bill were to be passed it would "cast Georgia's strongest partners, the United States and European Union, as malign actors". The letter also said that if the bill were passed, the Senate would begin proceedings into sanctioning GD leadership and lawmakers, the end of U.S. financial assistance to Georgia, and the expansion of visa bans to the United States.

On 14 May, U.S. officials threatened to sanction Georgian politicians due to the approval of the bill by Georgian MPs. After speaking with Georgian officials, Assistant Secretary of State Jim O’Brien told the press: "If the law goes forward out of conformity with EU norms and there's undermining of democracy here and there's violence against peaceful protesters, then we will see restrictions coming from the United States. Those tend to be financial and/or travel restrictions on the individuals responsible for those actions and their families." Additionally, the White House Press Secretary, Karine Jean-Pierre told TURAN Information Agency that the U.S. expects the President of Georgia to veto the bill. She elaborated that if the parliament overrides the potential veto and if the legislation, which runs counter to the democratic EU and NATO values, were to pass, then "it will compel us to fundamentally reassess our relationship with Georgia".

On 23 May, Secretary of State Antony Blinken announced a visa restriction policy targeting individuals involved in "undermining democracy in Georgia" and initiated a comprehensive review of all U.S.-Georgia cooperation. The restrictions apply to those responsible for "suppressing civil society and freedom of peaceful assembly through violence or intimidation". Blinken criticized the "foreign influence law" passed by the ruling Georgian Dream party, stating it would stifle freedoms of association and expression, stigmatize organizations "serving Georgian citizens", and impede independent media.

The visa restrictions will affect individuals complicit in "undermining democracy in Georgia", including their family members. Blinken's statement highlighted that in response to public opposition to the law, the authorities launched "a campaign of intimidation and violence" against peaceful dissent. He noted that both the "national security law" and the repressive tactics used to quell legitimate dissent "undermine Georgia's democracy" and contradict its long-stated goal of Euro-Atlantic integration and strategic partnership with the United States.

Furthermore, the restrictions extend to individuals "undermining democratic processes or institutions", particularly in the context of Georgia's October 2024 elections. The policy also covers the immediate family members of such individuals. Blinken announced a comprehensive review of bilateral cooperation between the United States and Georgia, expressing hope that Georgia's leaders would reconsider the draft law and take steps towards their nation's "democratic and Euro-Atlantic aspirations". The outcomes of this review will influence future U.S. actions and decisions regarding the relationship between the two countries.

On August 9, Georgia's Presidential Administration released a letter from U.S. President Joe Biden to President Salome Zourabichvili, marking the 16th anniversary of Russia's invasion. Biden condemned Russia's ongoing occupation of Georgian territories and reaffirmed U.S. support for Georgia's sovereignty and territorial integrity.

In his letter, Biden also acknowledged the Georgian people's aspirations for Euro-Atlantic integration, praising their commitment to a democratic future. However, he expressed disappointment with the Georgian government's recent actions, specifically referencing the controversial “foreign agents” law and misleading statements by officials that conflict with European Union and NATO standards. Despite these concerns, Biden emphasized the strong, enduring partnership between the United States and Georgia, grounded in shared values of peace, stability, freedom, and human rights.

=== Venice Commission ===
In May 2024, during the second attempt to adopt the law, the Venice Commission strongly recommended to "repeal the law in its current form, as its fundamental flaws will involve significant negative consequences for the freedoms of association and expression, the right to privacy, the right to participate in public affairs as well as the prohibition of discrimination".

The commission concluded the law is not compatible with six articles of the European Convention on Human Rights and International Covenant on Civil and Political Rights. It also regretted the law was adopted while disregarding the objections in Georgian society and concluded "this manner of proceeding does not meet the European requirements of democratic law-making". Georgian Dream rejected the report, saying there are "many unsubstantiated and conflicting legal reasonings as well as a number of gross distortions of facts", which "undermines the credibility of the institution and the values it should serve".

== See also ==
- Foreign funding of NGOs
- Foreign agent
- 2007 Georgian demonstrations
- 2011 Georgian protests
- 2019 Georgian protests
- 2020–2021 Georgian political crisis
- 2024–2025 Georgian protests
- 2025 Slovak protests
