= Democratic backsliding in Georgia =

Democratic backsliding in Georgia has occurred after initial phases of democratisation, following the 2003 Rose Revolution, while Mikheil Saakashvili was president, and following the 2012 Georgian parliamentary election, when Bidzina Ivanishvili and Georgian Dream (GD) came to power. Democratic backsliding during the GD period includes the systematic weakening of electoral competition and checks on power following the pattern of competitive authoritarian regimes, in particular starting with the 2023 proposal of a foreign agent law. By late 2025, democratic backsliding characteristics included, as summarised by the European Commissioner for Enlargement, the "rapid erosion of the rule of law and severe restrictions on fundamental rights ... [including] legislation severely limiting civic space, undermining freedom of expression and assembly, and violating the principle of non-discrimination".

== Overview ==
Historical V-Dem Democracy Indices for electoral democracy (solid) and liberal democracy (dotted) for Georgia

In March 2023, Stephen F. Jones and Natalie Sabanadze described post-Soviet Georgia as going through several cycles of democratisation and backsliding towards authoritarianism. They listed two cycles, with the 2003 Rose Revolution and the 2012 Georgian parliamentary election as democratising events, both followed by "revert[ing] to the Georgian norm – a single dominant party using the resources of the state, coopted businesses, and the judiciary to control its citizens." They saw the 2023 proposal of a foreign agent law by Georgian Dream (GD) as illustrating a backsliding phase, of "single-party dominance, parliamentary boycotts, and mutual mudslinging."

== Backsliding characteristics ==
=== Saakashvili presidencies ===
According to Jones and Sabanadze, democratic backsliding took place "quickly" after Mikheil Saakashvili became president in the 2004 presidential election that followed the Rose Revolution. In December 2007, the International Crisis Group (ICG) judged the Saakashvili government's 7 November repression of the 2007 Georgian demonstrations as disproportionate. The ICG described the government as "unwilling to countenance criticism" and stated that "checks and balances [had] been stripped back, justice arbitrarily applied, human rights too often violated, and freedom of expression curtailed". On 7 November, government forces raided Imedi TV, a private television station, smashing equipment including a New York Times photographer's camera, pillaging film archives and assaulting staff. The government declared a state of emergency, blocking all non-government media, which it lifted on 16 November. Imedi was only allowed to broadcast again starting on 5 December. ICG saw the Saakashvili government as moving "along an increasingly illiberal path". Following the 2013 end of his second presidency, Saakashvili was prosecuted and later imprisoned.

=== Ivanishvili/Georgian Dream ===
In the 2012 parliamentary election and the 2013 presidential election, Bidzina Ivanishvili and the political party Georgian Dream (GD) gained political control of Georgia.

==== 2019/2020 electoral reform ====
In November 2019, a proposal to replace the mixed electoral system by a fully proportional system, aimed at making it more difficult for a party with a relative majority of the national level votes to have a much greater share of the seats in parliament than its vote share, was defeated in parliament. Researchers Kornely Kakachia and Bidzina Lebanidze saw the defeat of the bill as democratic backsliding. US Senators Jim Risch and Jeanne Shaheen viewed both the defeat of the bill and police violence against street protests in 2019 as signs of democratic backsliding. In 2020, before the 2020 parliamentary election, a compromise between the government and opposition resulted in change to the parliamentary electoral system, with 120 proportional and 30 majoritarian seats for the 2020 election, an election threshold of 1% of the votes, and a constraint preventing a party with less than forty percent of the votes from having a majority of seats; and a fully proportional system starting in 2024. In November 2020, Iulia-Sabina Joja of the Middle East Institute disagreed with the claims of democratic backsliding under GD, stating that "Georgia has fared well over the last eight years and GD [stayed] on the path of democratization and reform". She viewed the GD management of the 2020 Georgian parliamentary election as giving Georgia the role of a "regional beacon of democracy".

==== 2023 foreign agent law proposal ====
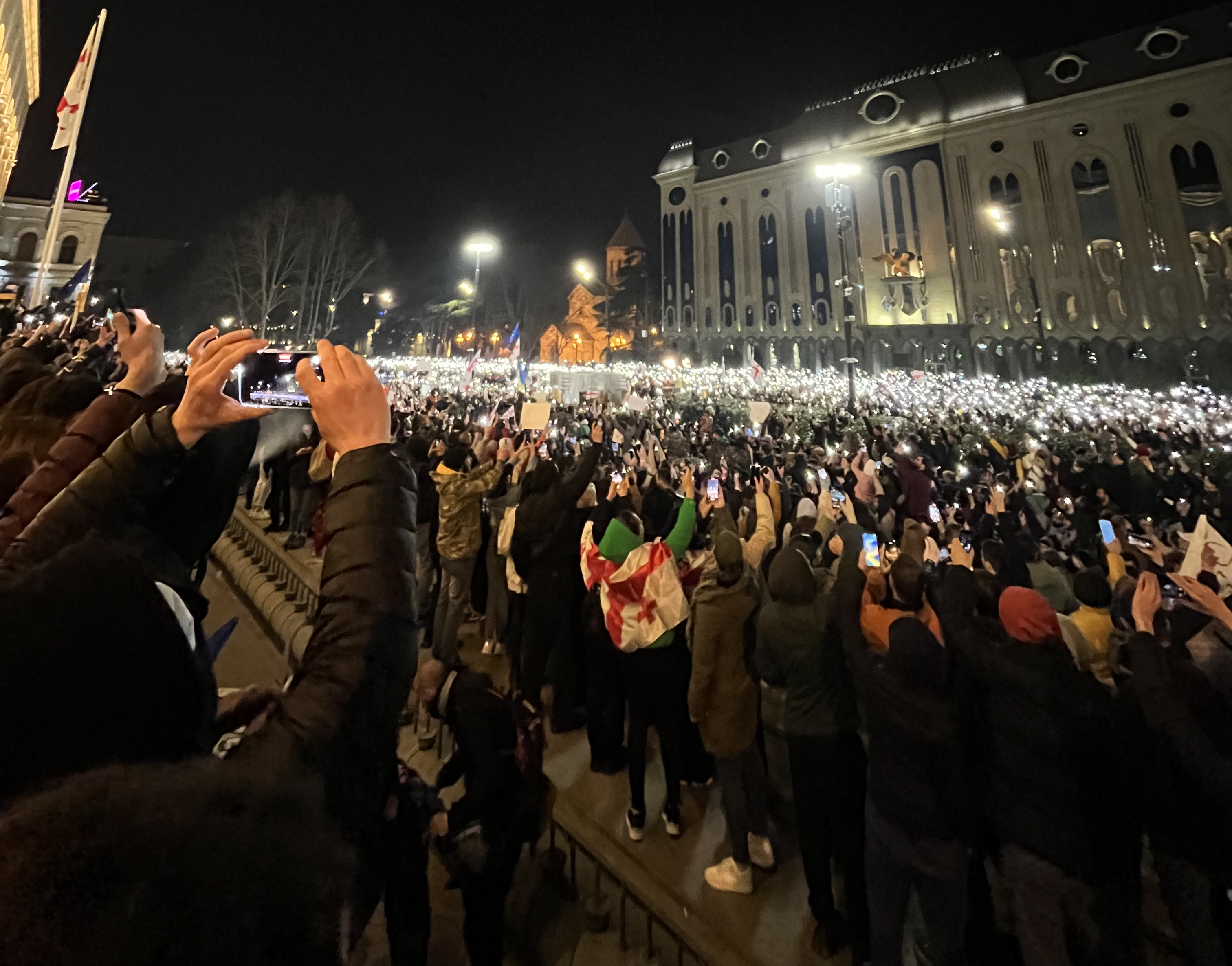
Protesters in Tbilisi on 8 March 2023

The proposal of a foreign agent law, which led to the 2023–2024 Georgian protests, was widely seen as a key event in democratic backsliding in Georgia. In June 2023, Liana Fix and Caroline Kappa, writing for the Council on Foreign Relations, compared it to the Russian foreign agent law. The Economist saw it as a key factor in February 2025, and Meladze and Asaad described it in July 2025 as the "single biggest factor in the recent avalanche of antidemocratization".

The European Union responded to the foreign agent law proposal by freezing negotiations with Georgia on its accession to the EU, citing democratic backsliding. Following the parliamentary election in October 2024, Georgian president Salome Zourabichvili accused GD of "total falsification" of the votes.

In June 2023, Fix and Kappa stated that Georgia appeared to be undergoing democratic backsliding in that the party in power, Georgian Dream (GD), was "expanding control over state institutions and security forces, infringing on civil society work and independent media, committing election malpractice (such as voter intimidation, vote-buying, exerting pressure on candidates and voters, and encouraging an uneven playing field), and applying selective justice." Fix and Kappa argued that GD's proposal of a foreign agent law, withdrawn after major street protests, was similar to the 2012 Russian foreign agent law that they viewed as a key turning point towards democratic backsliding in Russia. They cited the sanctioning of four Georgian judges by the United States (US) for corruption and abuses of power as a sign of weakening public trust in the Georgian judiciary.

The Economist Democracy Index found democratic backsliding in Georgia to be the fourth largest democratic backsliding worldwide in 2024.

In 2025, political scientists Ángel Torres-Adán and Aron Buzogány listed "electoral malpractices, the curtailing of fundamental democratic freedoms, attempts to silence civil society and turning away from a pro-EU pathway" as characteristics of democratic backsliding in Georgia from 2019 to 2024.

In June 2025, European Commissioner for Startups, Research and Innovation Ekaterina Zaharieva viewed "a growing pattern of harassment, intimidation, and politically motivated persecution against journalists, civil activists, and opposition figures" as signs of Georgian democratic backsliding.

In July 2025, researchers Giorgi Meladze and Nadia Asaad viewed GD as "systematically dismantling electoral competition" and "incrementally dismantl[ing] checks on its power" and increasing its control of political power by tightening media regulations, obstructing election-monitoring organisations via the foreign agents law, state capture, and political persecution, and propaganda. They described the process as "no longer so much backsliding as tumbling headlong into an abyss". They viewed the democratic backsliding as following a standard pattern in competitive authoritarian regimes, in which "elections, the legislative and judicial branches, and the media are subverted in function, disabling accountability and hollowing out democratic competition to produce a polarized society in which opposition to incumbents cannot effectively mobilize".

Repression of activists and members of political parties is seen as an element of democratic backsliding. This includes "brut[al] target[ing]" of protestors and members of opposition political parties following the 2024 post-election protests, with "most of the leaders" of Lelo for Georgia "serving seven- or eight-month prison terms" (as of July 2025). Meladze and Asaad described this as "political competition [being] weaponized."

In November 2025, the European Commissioner for Enlargement stated that during 2025, Georgia had undergone "serious democratic backsliding marked by a rapid erosion of the rule of law and severe restrictions on fundamental rights ... [including] legislation severely limiting civic space, undermining freedom of expression and assembly, and violating the principle of non-discrimination". Georgian former defence minister Vasil Sikharulidze stated in November that Georgia was in the "final phase of state capture".

In December 2025, Transparency International Georgia stated that GD had decided to close the Anti-Corruption Bureau, that "state capture is complete" and that there was "no independent state body" available to respond to corruption.

"Interference in the education system and some universities" was seen as an element of backsliding in November 2025 by Sikharulidze.

== Proposed causal factors ==
Researchers have proposed different contributing factors for the democratic backsliding in Georgia. Jones and Sabanadze found both a customary factor, a "Western-imported" focus on winning elections as opposed to the processes of deliberative democracy, and structural factors, such as political parties' inability to build consensus for concrete social improvements. Torres-Adán and Buzogány found in July 2025 that strengthening "specific" support for democracy, in the sense of support for the political party that retained power in elections, GD, paradoxically contributed to backsliding.

Jones and Sabanadze attributed key factors in the backsliding periods as including both customary and structural factors. They saw a norm of confrontational politics as being the main customary factor. They described the main structural factor as being "Western imported institutions" and "Western ... democracy promotion" favouring Westminster system election-centred majoritarian aspects of democracy as opposed to deliberative or consensus democratic processes. They viewed the election-centred focus as maintaining the customary factor of confrontation, with a "winner-takes-all electoral system and top-down [political] parties". In this sense, Jones and Sabanadze attributed part of the responsibility for democratic backsliding in 2022 to Georgian political parties' "[inability] to collaborate or build consensus around demands for jobs, improved healthcare and housing" and to "economic polarization [having] led to a stark urban–rural divide and exclusion of ethnic minorities in the regions from political life." Meladze and Asaad similarly saw polarization as a key causal factor, stating that "a profound, elite-driven polarization [weakened] trust in institutions, fueled public cynicism, and fractured Georgian society into rival blocs that bitterly distrust one another". Transparency International Georgia stated that civil society organisations had been legally excluded from participating in administrative decision-making.

Torres-Adán and Buzogány found that during 2019–2024, Georgian public opinion in favour of democracy strengthened. Following David Easton's definitions, their analysis separately studied "diffuse" support for democracy (support for democracy as a general method of governance) versus "specific" support (support for actual democratic processes in Georgia). Both increased during 2019–2024. Torres-Adán and Buzogány proposed to explain the paradox of democrating backsliding coinciding with increased popular support for democracy by a "strong partisan effect", in which a sufficient level of popular support for the political party in power, GD, permitted it to attack democracy with low political costs.

The Economist attributed the backsliding to the foreign agent law, irregularities in the 2024 parliamentary election, and an indirect Russian intervention.

Meladze and Assad saw Bidzina Ivanishvili, whose wealth they estimated at about "a quarter of [Georgia's] gross domestic product, as having "enormous financial clout [that] backs an entire ecosystem of political groups, government-organized 'nongovernmental' organizations, and media outlets that push whatever line Ivanishvili wants them to push".

== See also ==
- Democratic backsliding in Europe by country
