= Foreign funding of non-governmental organizations =

Foreign funding of non-governmental organizations (NGOs) is a controversial issue in some countries. In the late Cold War and afterward, foreign aid tended to be increasingly directed through NGOs, leading to an explosion of NGOs in the Global South reliant on international funding. Some critics of foreign funding of NGOs contend that foreign funding orients recipients toward donor priorities, making them less responsive to the communities they work in.

In 2013, a study published in Journal of Democracy surveyed 98 countries and found that "51 either prohibit (12) or restrict (39) foreign funding of civil society". The United Nations considers foreign funding of NGOs to be a right of freedom of association; however, critics argue that restrictions are justified in order to protect national sovereignty from corrosive foreign influence.

== Background ==
In the late Cold War and afterward, foreign aid tended to be increasingly directed through NGOs, leading to an explosion of NGOs in the Global South reliant on international funding. Between 1994 and 2015, many countries passed laws limiting foreign funding of NGOs, which were usually justified by rhetoric of national sovereignty and the desire to ward off foreign influence. According to a 2019 study in Social Forces, "new funding laws are part of a growing backlash against the liberal international order", especially by illiberal and/or anti-Western governments. In 2006, Thomas Carothers termed this phenomenon "the backlash against democracy promotion", which he dates to Chinese and Russian restrictions in the early 2000s. In 2013, a study published in Journal of Democracy surveyed 98 countries and found that "51 either prohibit (12) or restrict (39) foreign funding of civil society".

== By country ==
=== Africa ===
==== Egypt ====
A 2002 law restricted the activities of NGOs which received foreign funding, prohibiting them to engage in any political or policy related work. Egypt–United States relations were seriously disrupted by raids on NGOs which occurred in July 2011, several months after the overthrow of Hosni Mubarak. Civil society organizations had criticized the Supreme Council of the Armed Forces' handling of the power transfer. In 2013, 42 employees of various NGOs including Freedom House and the Konrad Adenauer Foundation were convicted of "operating an organization without a license and receiving illegal foreign funding".

==== Ethiopia ====
Ethiopia introduced restrictive anti-foreign NGO legislation, the Charities and Societies Proclamation, in 2009, but substantially relaxed it in 2019.

==== Kenya ====
In 2013, a Kenyan law which would have imposed a cap on foreign funding was rejected by the legislature. However, in 2014 President Uhuru Kenyatta stated that he would not allow "organizations advancing foreign interests to destabilize the government".

==== Nigeria ====
Foreign funding of NGOs, including newspapers, also occurs in Nigeria. Nigeria adopted a law restricting foreign funding in 2017, closely modeled on a similar law adopted by Sierra Leone in 2016. Freedom House stated that the law could lead to "improper state control of NGO programs, if not outright co-optation of NGOs".

==== Uganda ====
In Uganda, the regulation of foreign funding for non-governmental organizations (NGOs) is primarily governed by the NGO Act 2016 and the NGO (Amendment) Act 2024, which require the disclosure of fund sources and promote financial self-sustainability.

As of 2026, the issue remains controversial following the January 2026 suspension of several high-profile human rights and election-monitoring NGOs by the National Bureau for NGOs. These suspensions, often based on allegations of activities "prejudicial to national security" under Section 42(d) of the Act, have been criticized by civil society as a means of restricting foreign influence and civic space during election periods. Additionally, a proposed NGO Funding Act was introduced to Parliament in early 2026 with the aim of reducing dependency on foreign donors by mandating government vetting of large international grants.

==== Zimbabwe ====
Zimbabwe prohibits foreign NGOs from engaging in any work related to governance and limits the activities of local NGOs which accept foreign funding. In 2004, ZANU-PF passed a bill which would have banned foreign NGOs, which was not signed by the president. Zimbabwe also cracked down on foreign NGOs prior to the 2008 and 2013 elections, claiming they were too involved in politics. Jeanne Elone wrote that Zimbabwe's constitutional guarantee of freedom of association is "obstructed by prohibitions against unregistered groups, complex registration procedures, vague grounds for denial, re-registration requirements, and barriers for international organizations".

=== Americas ===
==== Nicaragua ====
A study of NGOs in Nicaragua concluded that foreign funding increased professionalization, and caused NGOs to focus more on delivering services than policial activism, compared to grassroots membership organizations.

==== Venezuela ====
In 2006, Venezuela rejected a law which would have forbidden foreign funding of NGOs entirely. A less restrictive law was passed in 2010. In the interim, Venezuela redirected its foreign policy and was no longer allied with countries which disapproved of such restrictions.

==== USA ====
The Foreign Agents Registration Act is a United States law that imposes public disclosure obligations on persons representing foreign interests.

=== Asia ===
==== Cambodia ====
A study of foreign funding in NGOs operating in Cambodia found that donors prefer organizations with more professionalization, but do not prioritize those which have strong grassroots connections and local legitimacy.

==== China ====
The Law on Administration of Foreign NGOs' Activities within China regulates foreign NGOs in China. Per the law, foreign NGOs are required to register with the Ministry of Public Security (MPS) or its provincial-level equivalents before establishing an office within mainland China, or register with the MPS if they want to carry out a "temporary activity". An office is legally required for permanent access in mainland China. It also requires coordinate with a domestic Chinese organization known as a professional supervisory unit in addition to the MPS in both cases.

==== India ====
Foreign Contribution (Regulation) Act, 2010 is the law that governs foreign funding in India According to a 2014 Intelligence Bureau report, certain NGOs (such as Greenpeace, Cordaid, Amnesty International, and Action Aid) reduced India's GDP by a few percent each year. The Modi government cancelled the licenses of almost 20,000 NGOs by 2018, which led to a 40% reduction in foreign funding to NGOs.

==== Israel ====
Israel has laws requiring NGOs to disclose the source of their funds. Those NGOs which receive over 50% of their funding from foreign sources must report on this funding to the authorities and publish relevant information on their websites and "in any other way selected by the Ministry of Justice". The list of foreign-funded NGOs is also published on the Ministry of Justice's website.

Certain left-wing NGOs receive disproportionate funding from the European Union and Western European countries, which is perceived by opponents to undermine the policies of Israel's democratically elected government.

==== Kazakhstan ====
Kazakhstan has legislation that obliges entities receiving "money and/or other property" from "foreign source" to provide the tax authority with information on each receipt of foreign funding. The information is published on the tax authority's website. Materials published and/or distributed at the expense of foreign funding must include information about the foreign source.

=== Europe ===
==== Hungary ====
In 2017, Hungary passed Law No LXXVI of 2017 on the Transparency of Organisations which receive Support from Abroad, which restricted foreign funding of NGOs. On 18 June 2020, the European Court of Justice ruled that the law violated European Union law by "introduc[ing] discriminatory and unjustified restrictions", violating free movement of capital and other guaranteed rights.

==== Slovakia ====
On 30 April 2024, Slovakia's parliament approved in the first reading the legislative amendment introduced by the Slovak National Party. The bill would require non-profit organizations which annually receive more than €5,000 from outside of Slovakia to register as "organizations with foreign support". The bill would oblige these organizations to disclose identity and nationality of donors and creditors. The organizations funded by more than €50,000 per year would be obliged to submit an annual report to the Ministry of the Interior. The Ministry would be able to dissolve the organizations which would fail to follow the regulations. The law has been described as stricter than Hungarian law, but softer than Russian and Georgian laws.

==== Ireland ====
In December 2017 newspapers reported that the Standards in Public Office Commission found that the Amnesty International Ireland had violated Ireland's campaign finance laws which prohibit foreign donors making donations to groups in Ireland who influence government policy. This was related to the Amnesty International Ireland's campaign to revise Ireland's abortion laws and the funding it received from George Soros Open Society Foundation. Amnesty Ireland stated that they were not going to obey the Commission's instruction to return the funding, as it considered it a violation of its - and other Irish NGOs' - rights to freedom of association and expression.

Amnesty initiated a High Court challenge to SIPO's instruction. The case was heard in July 2018 and as part of the settlement agreement, the High Court heard that SIPO now accepts its decision that the donation was for political purposes and must be returned was "procedurally flawed". The Commission had frequently stated in its reports that this provision is overly wide and cannot have been the intention of the legislature, except where groups are involved in campaigning at elections or referendums. Amnesty said it was pleased that the decision has been quashed and that it was vindicated in its decision to challenge the decision. Amnesty also said that it hopes the Government will reform the Electoral Act.

==== Poland ====
In May 2020, Law and Justice environment minister Michal Wos announced that the Polish government was considering a law to require NGOs to disclose foreign funding, because "Poles have a right to know whether they are indeed organisations that work in the interests of Poles". The proposed law was criticized by the opposition; critics argued that the government was trying to suppress criticism.

==== Russia ====
The Russian foreign agent law requires foreign-funded NGOs to register as "foreign agents" (Russian: Иностранные агенты), a Soviet-era dysphemism for Soviet dissidents.

==== Georgia ====
On 7 March 2023, the Georgian Parliament passed the Law on Transparency of Foreign Influence in the first reading, which requires NGOs receiving foreign funding to register as "agents of foreign influence" if the foreign support amounts to 20% of their total revenue. The bill requires NGOs to disclose the source of their funds but does not impose any restriction on their activities. The draft law was criticized by the US State Department, United Nations and European Union. The proposed law caused protests, due to which the parliament suspended further discussions of the bill.

On 3 April 2024, it was announced that the similar draft law would be submitted to the Parliament. On 8 April, the Bureau of Parliament of Georgia registered the bill for the parliamentary discussions. The Parliament passed the draft law with the third reading at the plenary session on 14 May, with 84 votes to 30.

On 8 February 2024, the President of Abkhazia, a breakaway republic internationally recognized as part of Georgia, submitted a draft Law on Foreign Agents to the Parliament. The law would ban organizations and individuals receiving funds and/or property from foreign sources from participating in politics, holding rallies and protests, and obtaining state funding. According to the explanatory note, the law would be an "immediate response" to foreign involvement in Abkhazia's politics.

==== Belarus ====
In 2001, Belarus introduced a mandatory authorization system for foreign funding of NGOs. Funds transferred from abroad, regardless of their value, have to be registered with the government. The registration may be denied for a broad number of reasons. The only exception of the requirement to register funding is when it is provided in accordance with programs approved by the President of Belarus or with international treaties ratified by Belarus. Since 2011, the violations of rules regarding receiving foreign funding may result in criminal liability. Foreign funding of NGOs can not be used for promoting political material, preparing or conducting elections, meetings, protests and other assemblies, conducting other types of political and promotional work with the population etc.

==== Azerbaijan ====
In 2014, Azerbaijan adopted amendments and additions regulating foreign funding of NGOs. Any grant agreement, donation or service contract must be registered with the Ministry of Justice.

According to Azerbaijani law, unlike a "donation", a "grant" is always given for a specific purpose and can be attached to specific conditions. A right to issue a grant in Azerbaijan must be obtained by registration. It is required to have a registered office in Azerbaijan and an approval from the Ministry of Finance in order to be allowed to issue grants to NGOs.

== Pros and cons ==
Restrictions on foreign funding of NGOs are more common in hybrid or authoritarian states compared to liberal democracies.

In 2013, the United Nations Special Rapporteur on the Rights to Freedom of Peaceful Assembly and of Association, Maina Kiai, stated that "The right to freedom of association includes the right to seek, receive and use resources – human, material and financial – from domestic, foreign, and international sources." In 2014, The Economist reported that "More and more autocrats are stifling criticism by barring non-governmental organisations from taking foreign cash", citing Hungary as an example.

A 2015 study found that local human rights organizations in non-repressive developing countries often relied on international funding as the path of least resistance instead of seeking local funding. The authors of the study also stated that "excessive reliance on foreign aid is rarely healthy over the long term; it can easily weaken, distort, and divide domestic civil societies".

A 2020 study found that African countries which allowed foreign funding of NGOs had a higher voter turnout; the authors argued that this effect was because laws against foreign funding implied a democratic recession.

One argument against foreign funding is that it might cause NGOs to reorient their objectives to what donors are looking for at the moment, at the cost of local priorities (mission drift). However, foreign funding might not have as strong a crowding out effect as local government spending because the money is coming from foreigners, rather than tax money.

Supporters of foreign funding restrictions argue that they undermine national sovereignty and that NGOs may push political agendas while claiming to be neutral. Because foreign-funded NGOs are accountable to foreign donors rather than local communities or voters, with a lack of democratic checks and balances, they lack accountability from citizens of the countries that they operate in. Shaoguang Wang has argued that, "foreign donors often use their own preferences, priorities, and concern rather than local needs to dictate which types of local NGOs will dominate the scene". John Feffer stated that "Civic groups committed to universal values will sometimes (inadvertently or deliberately) work on behalf of the interests of foreign states."

Neo-Marxists have argued that foreign NGOs use their money to promote neoliberal policies that benefit United States and European elites at the expense of anti-imperialism.

One of the arguments in favor of restricting the foreign funding of NGOs raised in the context of the Georgia's passage of the Law on Transparency of Foreign Influence and related protests, is that the civil society groups should grow organically and spring from the country they are in, they should keep going on support mainly received from within the country rather than being dependent on foreign funding.

== See also ==
- Foreign agent
