= Foreign Influence Transparency Scheme Act 2018 =

Australian federal statute

Parliament of Australia
- Long title: An Act to establish a scheme to improve the transparency of activities undertaken on behalf of foreign principals, and for related purposes
- Enacted by: Parliament of Australia
- Enacted: 28 June 2018
- Considered by: Australian Senate
- Assented to: 29 June 2018

Legislative history

First chamber: Parliament of Australia
- Introduced by: Malcolm Turnbull
- First reading: 7 December 2017
- Second reading: 26 June 2018
- Third reading: 26 June 2018

Second chamber: Australian Senate
- First reading: 27 June 2018
- Second reading: 27 June 2018
- Third reading: 28 June 2018
- Status: In force

The Foreign Influence Transparency Scheme Act 2018 (Cth) (FITSA) is an Australian statute that creates a registration scheme for foreign agents in Australia.

FITSA is modelled on the American Foreign Agents Registration Act; when he introduced the bill that would become FITSA in Parliament, then–Prime Minister Malcolm Turnbull described it as an "improved version" of the American statute. The statute was part of a "package" of legislation aimed at countering foreign influence in Australia that the Turnbull government advanced beginning in December 2017. When drafting the bill, the Turnbull government worked closely with the United States Department of Justice. It was amended substantially following criticism from civil society groups that argued the original provisions would stifle freedom of speech.

FITSA received royal assent on 29 June 2018. It requires anyone who engages in lobbying or "any kind of communications activity for the purpose of political influence" on behalf of a "foreign principal"—a term that includes foreign governments and some other organizations—to register with the federal government, and imposes criminal penalties for failure to do so.

In April 2023, a Sydney businessman, Alexander Csergo, was charged under the law for passing information about AUKUS to agents of China's Ministry of State Security. In December 2023, former Liberal candidate and prominent fundraiser Di Sanh "Sunny" Duong became the first person to be criminally convicted for violations of the law. In July 2025, a third person was charged under the law for covertly collecting intelligence for China's Ministry of Public Security.

== Sources ==
- Draffen, Chris; Ng, Yee-Fui (2020). "Foreign Agent Registration Schemes in Australia and the United States: The Scope, Risk and Limitations of Transparency" (PDF). University of New South Wales Law Journal. 43 (4): 1101–1136.
- Robinson, Nick (2020). "'Foreign Agents' in an Interconnected World: FARA and the Weaponization of Transparency". Duke Law Journal. 69: 1075–1147.
