= Foreign agent =

Subject pursuing a foreign country's interests while outside its borders

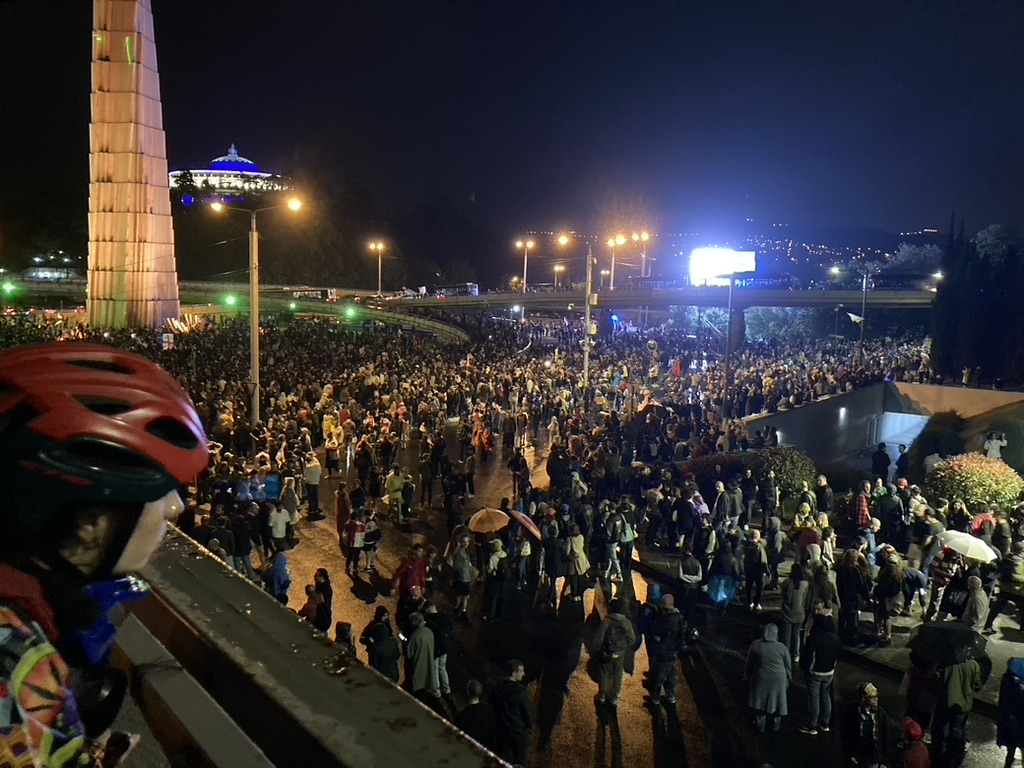
Photo of protesters in Tbilisi, Georgia protesting against a foreign agent law in 2024.

A foreign agent is any person or entity actively carrying out the interests of a foreign principal while located in another host country, generally outside the protections offered to those working in their official capacity for a diplomatic mission.

Foreign agents may be citizens of the host country. In contemporary English, the term has a generally pejorative connotation, reinforced by its use in the US laws aimed to curb the foreign influence. A covert foreign agent, also known as a secret agent of a foreign government, may in some countries be presumed to be engaging in espionage.

== Legality ==
Some countries have formal procedures to legalize the activities of foreign agents acting overtly. Laws covering foreign agents vary widely from country to country, and selective enforcement may prevail within countries, based on perceived national interest.

=== United States ===
In the United States, the Foreign Agents Registration Act (FARA) in 1938 created a wide-ranging and detailed definition of "foreign agent". There are three necessary components to be considered as a foreign agent under FARA. First, to be considered as a foreign agent, a legal or natural person must act in a capacity of an agent, representative, employee, servant, or any other capacity, at the order, request, or under the direction or control of a foreign principal. The conception of "request" is broad and falls between a command and a plea. Second, the activities must be conducted at the order, request, or under the direction or control of foreign principal or a person whose activities are "directly or indirectly supervised, directed, controlled, financed, or subsidized in whole or in major part by a foreign principal". Third, an agent's activities in the United States must include: engaging in political activities (meaning any activity believed or intended to influence the U.S. government or public about U.S. policy or other foreign interests), acting as a publicity agent or political consultant in the interests of the foreign principal, soliciting, collecting, or disbursing money or other things of value in the interests of a foreign principal, or representing the interests of a foreign principal before any agency or official of the U.S. government. The law also contains several exceptions to what activities would lead to classification as a foreign agent.

The text of FARA does not explicitly state whether funding is sufficient to establish agency. There were changing positions regarding this issue, which is also mirrored in the case law. In the first report on FARA to Congress, the Attorney General stated that an agent includes a person funded by a foreign principal. The two court rulings in 1943 emphasized that where the foreign principal paid for the specific publications registration of the publisher as an agent could be warranted.

However, in 1980, the court ruled that receiving "bona fide subsidy" from a foreign source does not render the recipient as a foreign agent unless the foreign direction or control is established. In 1981, in another case, an appellate court found that even the identical leadership and the financial connection were not sufficient to grant summary judgement and a full trial was required since mere provision of funds was insufficient and that "[n]o request, order, command, or directive was ever shown". In 2020, the National Wildlife Federation was ordered to register as a foreign agent because the grants which it received were linked to specific programs it should have carried out, thus, it fell under "request". Thus, mere funding is not necessary and additional "request, order, command, or directive" is required. For it to be established, it must be proved that the recipient acts not completely independently of the donor, therefore proving additional co-ordination is needed. However, foreign funding still can establish necessary agency where the dependency of an NGO on a particular foreign donor is so high that the donor can prescribe much of the work. This can mean donor requirements for funding and ongoing monitoring of use of funds, which will fall under the "request". The requested action must be clear to both sides. Apart from being generally dependent on donors, a particular level of control needs to be established. Besides, even if donors support specific agendas, a question arises whether concrete actions were requested, and, in case these specific activities are funded, it needs to be ascertained when the domestic action ends and when the activity can be described as being on behalf of foreign principal.

Per FARA, the foreign principal must be setting an agenda (not NGOs freely choosing their area of work) and donors must have primary interest in the activities. However, on the other hand, accepting certain requirements can be characterized as nothing more than agreeing with a viewpoint of the donor and insufficient to establish agency. Nevertheless, it can be considered that the donor exercises considerable influence over a recipient when the foreign funding of an NGO is an economic necessity for it, and it does not really have much of a free choice. Thus, the donor's funding policies may warrant the registration of agency.

Therefore, foreign funding may warrant NGOs to register as agents under FARA. However, the exact threshold of required control leveraged by foreign donors is difficult to properly clarify. Only donor dependency would not be sufficient and a specific relationship between NGO and donor needs to be established.

FARA requires intermediaries to register too, and NGOs can act as intermediaries when they receive foreign funding and hire employees. The Second Circuit Court of Appeals has ruled that to be considered as intermediary much more control is required than to be considered simply as agent, meaning that substantial amounts of funding need to be proven. The intermediary needs to register only when intermediary is sufficiently bound to the principal. Therefore, NGOs can become intermediaries when they have particularly strong connection to a donor. The financing alone can warrant this when the foreign principal can "make or break" organization because of how large a proportion NGO's revenue consists of foreign funding. There is no clear threshold, but the proposed amendment in 1990s suggested 50%. Although it was not passed, the wording of FARA suggests a majority of finances, i.e. 50%.

FARA was enacted in 1938 to counter Nazi propaganda. The law is sometimes claimed to be used to target countries out of favor with an administration. In 2021, the American Bar Association (ABA) called for a reform of FARA, including "renam[ing] FARA and otherwise replac[ing] the term 'agent of a foreign principal' with a term that elicits less stigma and causes less confusion".

=== Russia ===
Under the Russian foreign agent law enacted in 2012, non-governmental organizations, media outlets and private individuals have to designate themselves "foreign agents" in all external communication if they engage in "political activity", a broadly interpreted term, and receive any foreign funding. Specifically, it requires anyone who receives "support" or "influence" from outside Russia to register and declare themselves "foreign agents". The phrase "foreign agent" (Russian: иностранный агент) in Russian has strong associations with Cold War-era espionage.

The law was initially likened to FARA ("On their face, the laws seem similar, but their implementation has differed") although its scope has since been expanded significantly to include anyone who has received foreign support of any kind or has ever been "affiliated" with foreign actors; registrants are also prohibited from receiving state funding, teaching at state universities, or working with children. Failure to comply is subject to legal consequences. Still, many human rights organizations resisted the requirement and in 2014 the law was amended to authorize the Justice Ministry to register organizations as foreign agents without their consent.

=== Georgia ===
In 2023, the People's Power and Georgian Dream parties submitted a draft of a new foreign agent law to the Parliament of Georgia. This caused the 2023–2024 Georgian protests. The bill proposed that all non-governmental organizations and media outlets should disclose sources of their funding and register themselves as "agents of foreign influence" if they receive more than 20% of their funding from abroad. The president of Georgia, Salome Zourabichvili, supported the protesters and said she would veto the bill. The parliament withdrew the bill after protests. The bill was reintroduced in April 2024, with the ruling party head Mamuka Mdinaradze citing "the continued circulation of slush funds" and the need for transparency as the reason. The bill was passed by the Parliament on 14 May and was signed into the law.

=== Hungary ===
On 13 June 2017, the Hungarian National Assembly adopted the Law No LXXVI of 2017 on the Transparency of Organisations which receive Support from Abroad. The law required "associations and foundations" which receive at least 7.2 million HUF annually from abroad to disclose sources of their funding, register with the court as "an organization receiving foreign funding" and indicate this label on their website and publications. The violations resulted in fines and ultimately revoking of the entity's legal status.

On 18 June 2020, the European Court of Justice ruled that the law violated European Union law by "introduc[ing] discriminatory and unjustified restrictions", violating free movement of capital and other guaranteed rights. The law was repealed in 2021.

=== Australia ===
Australia's Foreign Influence Transparency Scheme Act 2018 (FITSA), enacted in December 2018, is based explicitly on FARA and was drafted in collaboration with the U.S. Department of Justice. Like its American counterpart, FITSA establishes registration obligations for individuals and entities that undertake certain activities aimed at "political or governmental influence" on behalf of foreign principles. The law imposes a lifetime obligation on former cabinet ministers to register any activity they undertake on behalf of a foreign principal unless an exemption applies.

=== Canada ===
In the wake of high-profile events – in particular, Chinese attempts to interfere in the 2019 and 2021 federal elections and the assassination of Hardeep Singh Nijjar – the government of Justin Trudeau came under political pressure to establish a foreign agents' registry. Private members bills were introduced to this effect, including the Senate Bill S-237, which targeted federal lobbyists which acted for foreign governments. On March 10, 2023, the Trudeau government launched public consultations on its own foreign agent registry proposal.

The Trudeau government proposed the Countering Foreign Interference Act, which was approved by the Parliament of Canada on June 20, 2024. Part 4 of the legislation enacts the Foreign Influence Transparency and Accountability Act. Under this Act anyone who enters into an "arrangement" with a "foreign principal" is required to register. A "foreign principal" is defined as a foreign power (including its subnational components), anyone acting at its direction or for its benefit, political parties within it, and any entity controlled by it. The Act describes an "arrangement" as any scheme to influence a political or governmental process (at various levels of government, from federal to provincial to municipal to tribal) through communication with a public official, dissemination of information about the process to the public, or through the provision of money, services, or facilities.

=== European Union ===
In March 2023, it was reported that the European Commission was working on a foreign agents law which would require commercial and nonprofit organizations around the European Union to reveal non-EU funding pertaining to transactions such as paying for academic study. This law aimed to contain influence of Russia and China and limit the corruption scandals such as Qatargate. A preliminary questionnaire supposed to feed into an impact assessment was sent out to the NGOs on behalf of the European Commission. The legislation is supposed to be modeled on the disclosure laws of the U.S. and Australia.

=== Ukraine ===
On 16 January 2014, amid the Euromaidan protests, a group of laws was adopted in Ukraine, which defined a foreign agent as a public association that receives funding from foreign states, foreign and international non-governmental organizations, as well as individuals who are not citizens of Ukraine, and participates in political activities on the territory of Ukraine. According to the law, foreign agents had to be registered, face high scrutiny and additional tax measures. On 2 February 2014, the relevant law was repealed.

=== Bosnia and Herzegovina ===
==== Republika Srpska ====
Legislation similar to the US Foreign Agents Registration Act has been passed in Republika Srpska.

== See also ==
- Foreign funding of non-governmental organizations
- Anti-Infiltration Act

== Sources ==
- Nägele, Carl Alexandr (11 July 2023). Non-Governmental Organizations as Foreign Agents – Foreign Funding of NGOs in Domestic and International Law (PDF).
- Van De Velde, Jacqueline (2018). "The Foreign Agent Problem: an International Legal Solution to Domestic Restrictions on Non-Governmental Organizations". Cardozo Law Review. 40: 687.
- Rebo, Samuel (2022). "FARA in Focus: What Can Russia's Foreign Agent Law Tell Us about America's?" (PDF). National Security Law and Policy. 12: 277–325.
- "Attorneys under the Foreign Agents Registration Act of 1938". Harvard Law Review. 78 (3): 619–634. 1965. doi:10.2307/1339118. JSTOR 1339118.
- Kupina, N. A. (2012). "Идеологема «иностранный агент»: три дня в июле 2012 года" [The "foreign agent" idiom: three days in the July of 2012] (PDF). Политическая лингвистика [Political linguistics] (in Russian) (3): 43–48.
