= Carl Hartzell =

Swedish diplomat

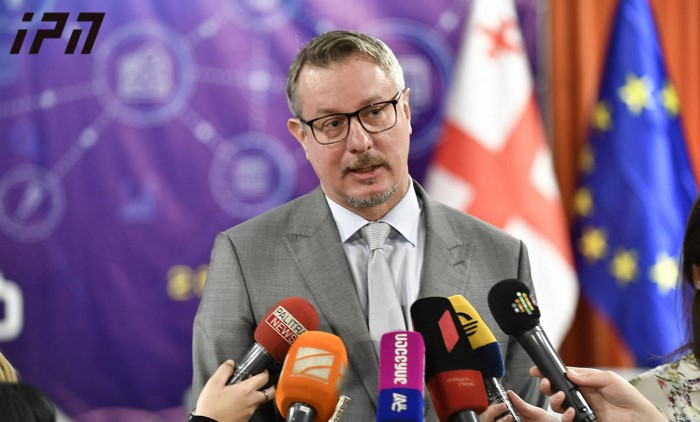
Carl Hartzell in April 2022

Carl Hartzell (born 4 May 1967) is a Swedish diplomat, currently serving as Director-General for EU Affairs at the Swedish Prime Minister’s Office, following the position as Deputy Director-General and Head of Department for Multilateral Governance and Humanitarian Policy at the Swedish Ministry for Foreign Affairs in Stockholm. After an early career in his home country in the 1990s, Hartzell subsequently held a number of positions in the European Union diplomatic service and, also, served as Ambassador of the European Union to Georgia from 2018 to 2022.

== Early career ==
Born in Stockholm, Hartzell obtained a Master's Degree from the Stockholm School of Economics and started his career at the Swedish Armed Forces Headquarters in 1993, followed by one year at the Ministry of Defence in 1996, and three years at the Swedish Ministry for Foreign Affairs in Stockholm from 1997 to 1999. He then held a number of positions in Brussels, both in EU institutions and as a Swedish diplomat, including as Member of the EU Policy Unit under High Representative Javier Solana (1999-2005), Minister Counsellor, Deputy Representative to the EU Political and Security Committee at the Swedish Permanent Representation to EU (2005–2011), Member of Cabinet of High Representative / Vice President Catherine Ashton (2012–2013), Senior Adviser to the Deputy Secretary General of the EU External Action Service (2013–2014), and Senior Foreign Policy Adviser to the President of the European Council, Donald Tusk (2014–2018). He also served as Distinguished Visiting Professor at the University of Wyoming, USA (2011-2012).

== Ambassador to Georgia ==
In September 2018, Hartzell was appointed EU Ambassador to Georgia, succeeding the Hungarian diplomat Janos Herman in this position. In December 2019 he initiated a political dialogue between all the major political parties, which resulted in a cross-party agreement on 8 March 2020. Following contested parliamentary elections in September 2020, Ambassador Hartzell was again called on to facilitate a political agreement between the political parties, which he carried out together with his US counterpart, Ambassador Kelly Degnan. Following an intervention by European Council President Charles Michel, Ambassador Hartzell participated to EU-led mediation efforts that resulted in the agreement “A Way Ahead For Georgia” on 19 April 2021. Following the decision taken by the ruling Georgian Dream party to leave the agreement, and after Georgia, in contrast to fellow former Soviet Union republics, Ukraine and Moldova, was not granted a EU candidate status in June 2022, Hartzell said Georgia could have been "better prepared" for its membership bid, "as it comes at a time when the EU is increasingly concerned about the country's current trajectory," hinting to the concerns over democratic backsliding under the Georgian Dream government. In response, the Georgian Dream party chairman Irakli Kobakhidze denounced Hartzell as having "played a strictly negative role in relations between the European Union and Georgia" in July 2022, being promptly rebuked by the EU's Lead Spokesperson for External Affairs Peter Stano who made a statement in support of Hartzell. Ambassador Hartzell's tenure in Georgia expired in August 2022, when he was succeeded by the Polish diplomat Pawel Herczyński.
