= Paweł Herczyński =

Polish diplomat

Paweł Herczyński Amb.
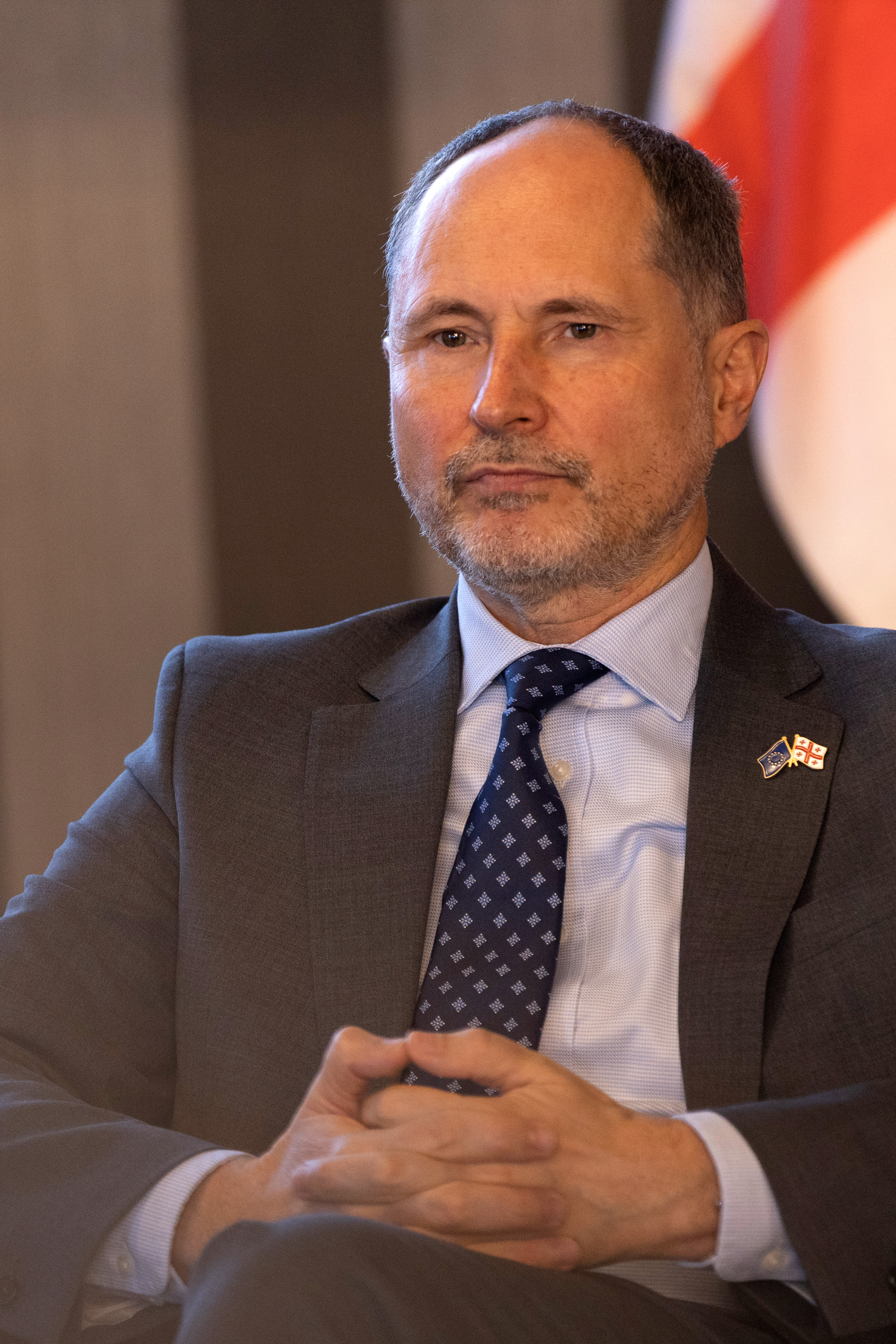
- Paweł Herczyński attending the Polish EU Presidency Priorities and Implications for Georgia on January 28, 2025

European Union Ambassador to Georgia
- Incumbent
- Assumed office September 2022
- President: Ursula von der Leyen
- Preceded by: Carl Hartzell

European External Action Service (EEAS) Managing Director for the Common Security and Defence Policy (CSDP) and Crisis Response
- In office September 2019 – September 2022

Director for Security and Defence Policy at the EEAS
- In office February 2017 – September 2019

Ambassador of Poland to the EU Political and Security Committee (PSC)
- In office 2013–2017

Personal details
- Education: Warsaw School of Economics Warsaw, Poland

Paweł Herczyński is a Polish diplomat and the EU ambassador to Georgia since September 2022.

== Life ==
Herczyński holds a master's degree in economics from the Warsaw School of Economics.

He served as the European External Action Service (EEAS) Managing Director for the Common Security and Defence Policy (CSDP) and Crisis Response, and also served as Director for Security and Defence Policy at the EEAS. Prior to that, he was Polish ambassador to the EU Political and Security Committee (PSC).

Herczyński held several senior positions within the Polish Foreign Ministry, including Deputy Permanent Representative to the UN, deputy director of the EU Department – European Correspondent, and Deputy Representative of Poland to NATO Political Committee in Brussels.

Paweł Herczyński speaks his native Polish, and also English, Spanish, German, French, and Russian.
