= Heroes Square =

Monument in Georgia

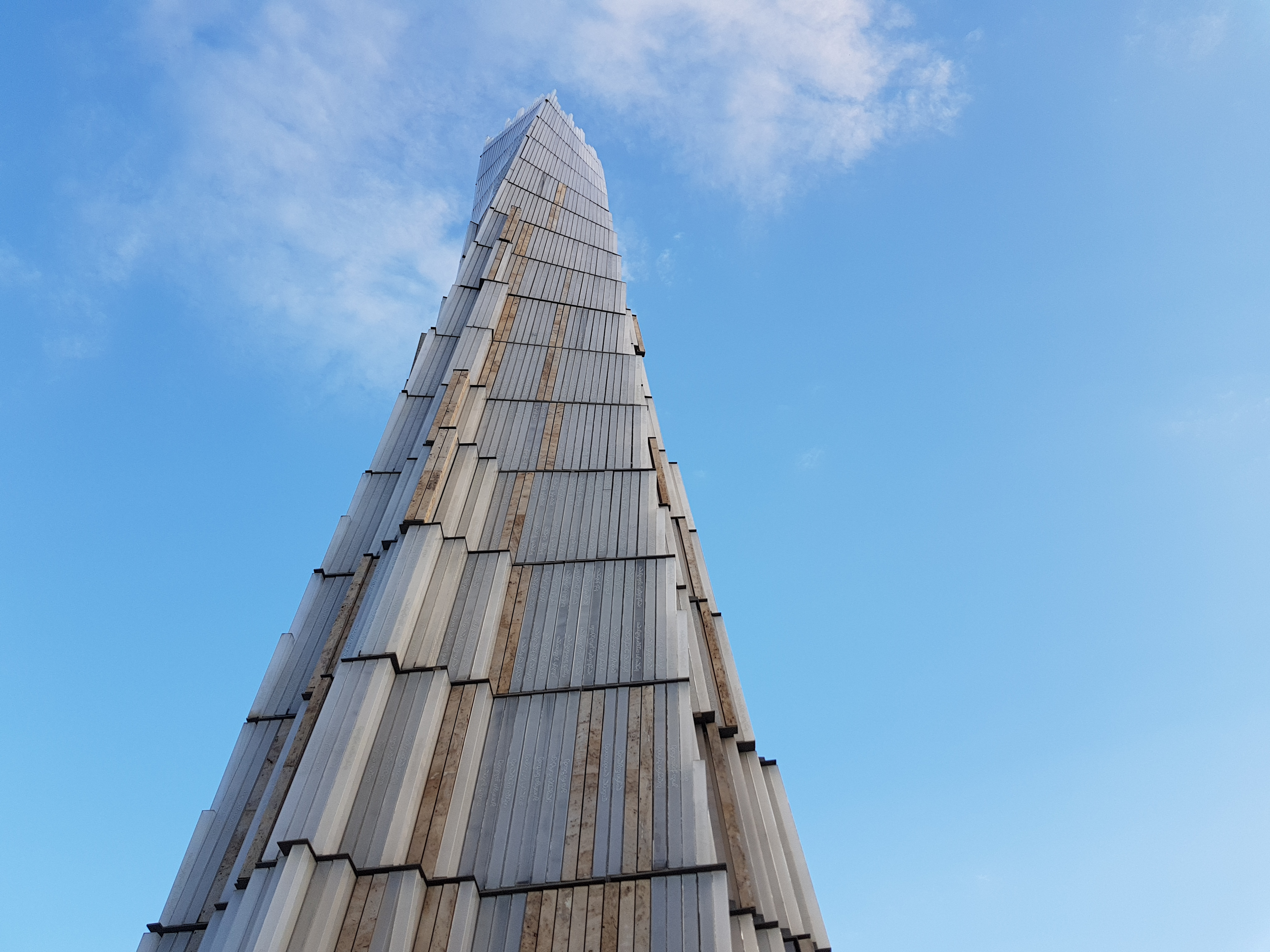
- Heroes Square Tbilisi

- Location within Tbilisi Location within Georgia
- Area: square
- Location: Tbilisi, Georgia
- Coordinates: 41°42′47″N 44°46′57″E

Heroes Square (Georgian: გმირთა მოედანი, romanized: gmirta moedani), in Tbilisi, Georgia, is a monument built to honor the memory of lost heroes of Georgia in the war against the Soviet Army and in operations in Abkhazia. Each day, two soldiers arrive in the morning at the sides of the Square, where a memorial stone is located, and, after paying tribute, stand at attention as a sign of respect.

The monument is located near the Tbilisi Zoo. It is 51 m high, with 16 marble faces, and is written in Georgian. The names of more than 4,000 Georgian victims were carved into the memorial in August 2008; they include the names of Georgian military students who died in the fight against the Red Army in 1921, those of the leaders of the anti-Soviet counterinsurgency in 1924, and those of the dead in the 5-day Abkhaz war in 1992 and 1993.

== Gallery ==
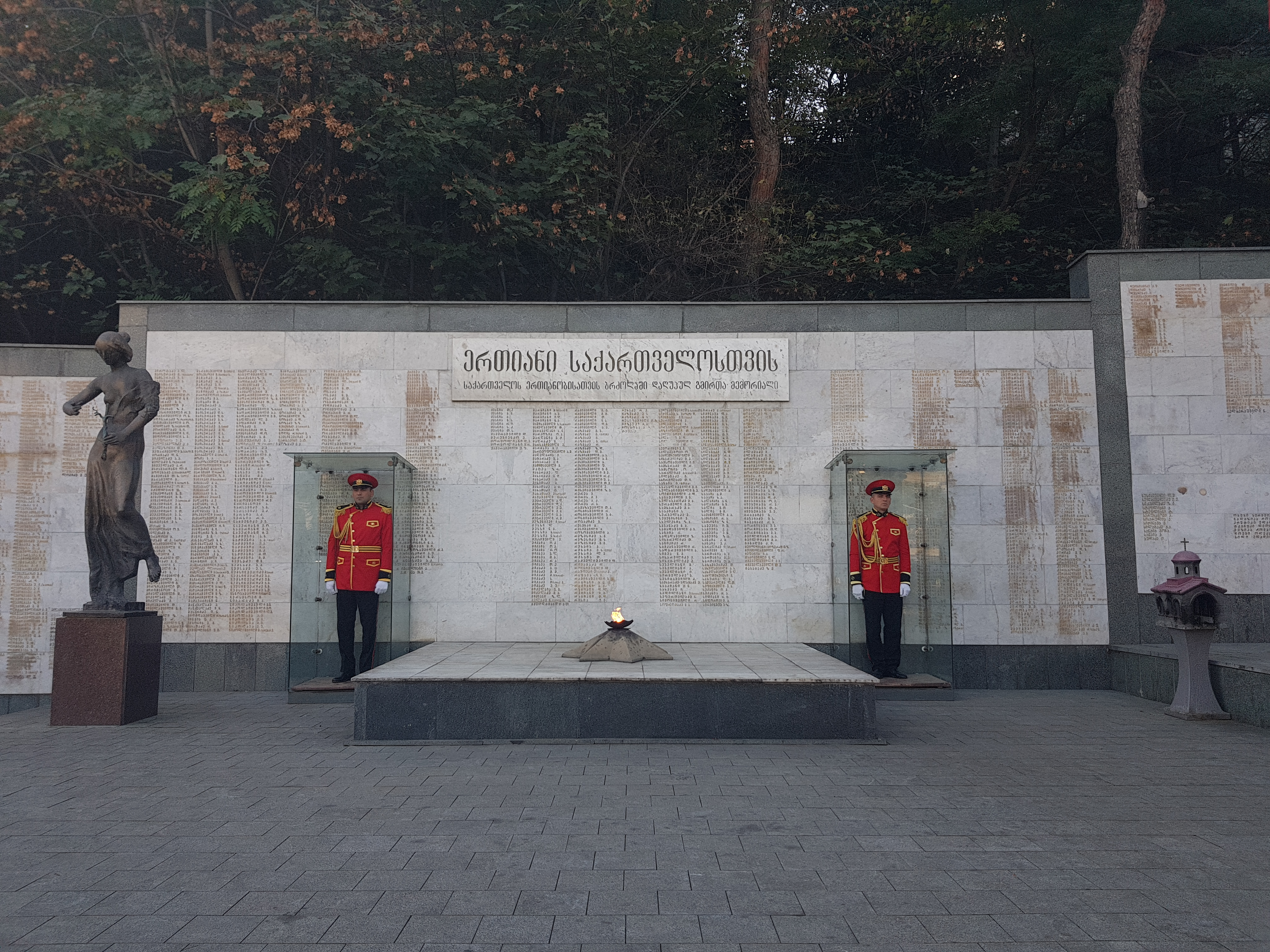

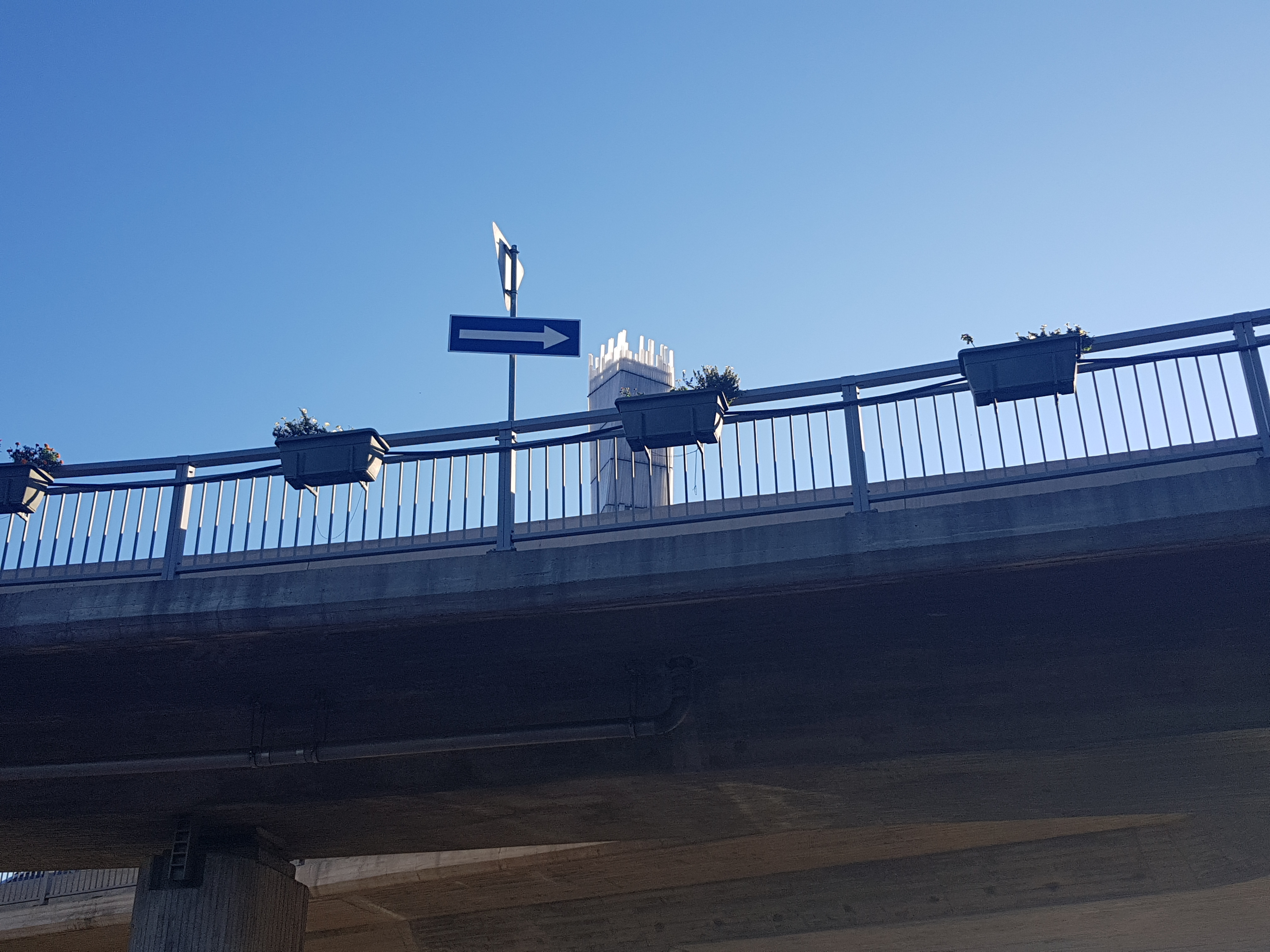

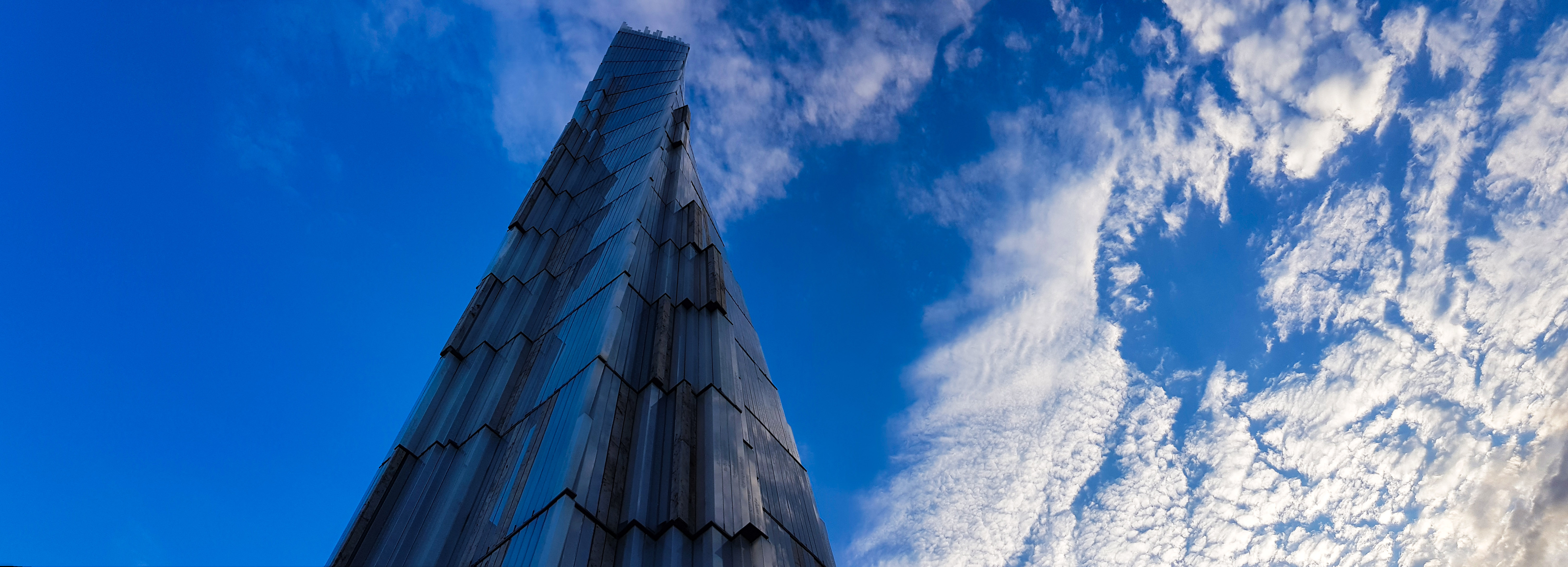
