= EU 27 =

EU 27 may refer to:

- From 1 February 2020, the 27 European Union member states after the UK left the EU
- From 2016 until 31 January 2020, the 27 European Union countries involved in Brexit negotiations with the UK; in other words, the EU except for the United Kingdom
- the European Union in the period between 2007 and 2013, before Croatia joined, when it had 27 countries, or the countries that were members then
- the 2007 enlargement of the European Union
