= Natalie Sabanadze =

Natalie Sabanadze is the Cyrus Vance Visiting Professor in International Relations at Mount Holyoke College and a former Georgian diplomat, serving as the ambassador to Belgium, Luxembourg and the EU.

== Early life and education ==
Sabanadze earned a bachelors from Mt. Holyoke College, masters from the London School of Economics and Ph.D. in International Relations from the University of Oxford. Earlier, she attended Tbilisi State University for one year then Swarthmore College before transferring to Mt. Holyoke.

== Publications ==
- Globalization and Nationalism: the cases of Georgia and the Basque Country published 2009
