= Law on Administration of Foreign NGOs' Activities within China =

2015 law in China

Law of the People's Republic of China on Administration of Foreign NGOs' Activities within China

Standing Committee of the National People's Congress
- Passed by: Standing Committee of the National People's Congress
- Passed: 28 April 2016
- Signed by: President Xi Jinping
- Signed: 28 April 2016
- Commenced: 1 January 2017

Legislative history
- Introduced by: State Council of China
- First reading: 22–28 December 2014
- Second reading: 20–24 April 2015
- Third reading: 25–28 April 2016
- Voting summary: 147 voted for; 1 voted against; 1 abstained
- Status: In force

Law on Administration of Foreign NGOs' Activities within China
- Simplified Chinese: 中华人民共和国境外非政府组织境内活动管理法
- Traditional Chinese: 中華人民共和國境外非政府組織境內活動管理法
Transcriptions
Standard Mandarin
- Hanyu Pinyin: Zhōnghuá Rénmín Gònghéguó Jìngwài Fēi Zhèngfǔ Zǔzhī Jìngnèi Huódòng Guǎnlǐ Fǎ

The Law of the People's Republic of China on Administration of Foreign NGOs' Activities within China is a legislation foreign non-governmental organizations in China. It was passed by the Standing Committee of the National People's Congress on 27 December 2015 came into effect on 1 January 2016.

== Legislative history ==
The law was adopted by the Standing Committee of the National People's Congress on 28 April 2016. It was signed by President Xi Jinping on the same day and came into effect on 1 January 2017.

== Provisions ==
The law defines foreign NGOs as "not-for-profit, non-governmental social organizations lawfully established outside mainland China, such as foundations, social groups, and think tank institutions". The requirements are:

1. Legally established outside of mainland China;
2. Able to independently bear civil liability;
3. Objectives and operational scope in its organizational charter are beneficial to the development of public welfare;
4. Has continuously carried out substantive activities outside of mainland China for two or more years;
5. Other requirements provided for in other laws or administrative regulations.

The law requires them to register with the Ministry of Public Security (MPS) or its provincial-level equivalents before establishing an office within mainland China, or register with the MPS if they want to carry out a "temporary activity". An office is legally required for permanent access in mainland China. It also requires coordinate with a domestic Chinese organization known as a professional supervisory unit in addition to the MPS in both cases. Foreign schools, foreign hospitals, foreign Natural science and engineering technology research institutions, and foreign academic organizations are exempt from this rule.

It allows foreign NGOs to work in "fields such as economics, education, science, culture, health, sports, and environmental protection, and for areas such as poverty relief and disaster relief", but prohibits them from engaging in activities that they claim to "endanger China’s national unity, security, or ethnic unity; and harm China’s national interests, societal public interest and the lawful rights and interests of citizens, legal persons and other organizations". They also "must not engage in or fund for-profit activities, political activities, or religious activities".

== Reactions ==
The legislation of this law sparked concerns about human rights in China. United Nations human rights experts stated their concerns that the law would suppress dissent in China and called on the authorities to repeal the draft in 2016. UN human rights experts pointed out that the definition of the draft law is too broad and violates the basic rights of freedom of association and expression, which would greatly affect NGOs and human rights organizations in mainland China. Bertram Lang, a researcher at the Mercator Institute for China Studies, believes that the government department responsible for managing foreign NGOs has changed from the Ministry of Civil Affairs (which still manages Chinese NGOs) to the Ministry of Public Security and the local level public security organs and police departments, indicating that the Chinese government regards foreign NGOs as factors involving national security rather than factors that play a positive role in promoting social development.

On 4 January 2018, the Charity Law Center of the China Philanthropy Research Institute of Beijing Normal University released the "Analysis Report on the Progress of the Implementation of the Law on the Management of Activities of Overseas Non-Governmental Organizations in China on the First Anniversary of its Implementation". The report shows that in 2017, when the law was implemented, a total of 259 overseas non-governmental organizations registered 305 representative offices, and another 224 overseas non-governmental organizations filed 487 temporary activities. Among the 305 representative offices registered in 2017, the largest number were headquartered in the United States, and a large number of the 487 temporary activities were filed by organizations from Hong Kong.
