= List of diplomatic missions of Georgia =

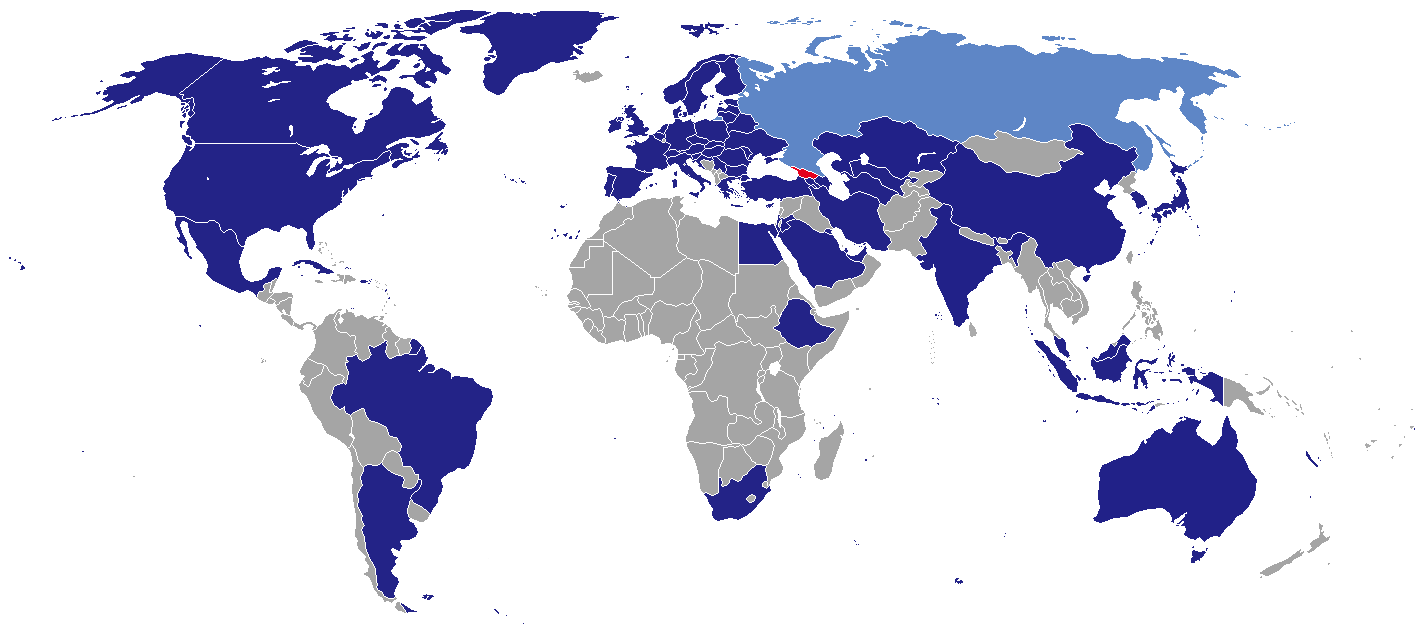
States hosting a diplomatic mission of Georgia

Georgia's location, nestled between the Black Sea, Russia, and Turkey, renders it strategically important. It is developing as the gateway from the Black Sea to the Caucasus and the larger Caspian region, but also serves as a buffer between Russia and Turkey. Georgia has a long and tumultuous relationship with Russia, but it is reaching out to its other neighbours and looking to the West in search of alternatives and opportunities. It signed a partnership and cooperation agreement with the European Union, participates in the Partnership for Peace, and encourages foreign investment. Georgia in 2004-2008 sought to become a member of NATO, but did not succeed in the face of strong Russian opposition.

Georgia is a member of the United Nations, the Council of Europe, and the OSCE. Because of its strategic location, Georgia is in both the Russian and American spheres of influence, however Georgia's relationship with Russia is at its lowest point since 1921 due to controversies regarding espionage and the Russo-Georgian War. As a result, Georgia broke off diplomatic relations with Russia and has left the Commonwealth of Independent States. From 2008 until 2012, Georgia established diplomatic relations with about 50 states.

== Current missions ==
=== Africa ===
Host country	Host city	Mission	Concurrent accreditation	Ref.
Egypt	Cairo	Embassy	Countries: Chad; Libya; Tunisia	
Ethiopia	Addis Ababa	Embassy	Countries: Burundi; Central African Republic; Djibouti; Kenya; Rwanda; Seychelles; Somalia; South Sudan; Tanzania; Uganda	
South Africa	Pretoria	Embassy	Countries: Angola; Botswana; Congo-Kinshasa; Eswatini; Lesotho; Madagascar; Malawi; Mauritius; Mozambique; Namibia; Palau; Zambia; Zimbabwe	

=== Americas ===
Host country	Host city	Mission	Concurrent accreditation	Ref.
Argentina	Buenos Aires	Embassy	Countries: Bolivia; Chile; Ecuador; Paraguay; Uruguay	
Brazil	Brasília	Embassy	Countries: Colombia; Guyana; Peru; Suriname; Trinidad and Tobago	
Canada	Ottawa	Embassy	International Organizations: International Civil Aviation Organization	
Cuba	Havana	Embassy		
Mexico	Mexico City	Embassy	Countries: Belize; Costa Rica; Dominica; Dominican Republic; Guatemala; Honduras; Jamaica; Panama; Saint Vincent and the Grenadines	
United States	Washington, D.C.	Embassy	International Organizations: Organization of American States (Note: Accredited as an observer mission.)	
United States	New York City	Consulate-General	International Organizations: Organization of American States	
United States	San Francisco	Consulate-General	International Organizations: Organization of American States	

=== Asia ===
Host country	Host city	Mission	Concurrent accreditation	Ref.
Armenia	Yerevan	Embassy		
Azerbaijan	Baku	Embassy		
Azerbaijan	Ganja	Consulate-General		
China	Beijing	Embassy	Countries: Mongolia; Vietnam	
India	New Delhi	Embassy	Countries: Bangladesh; Maldives; Nepal; Sri Lanka; Thailand	
Indonesia	Jakarta	Embassy	Countries: East Timor; Philippines; Singapore	
Iran	Tehran	Embassy	Countries: Pakistan	
Israel	Tel Aviv	Embassy		
Japan	Tokyo	Embassy	Countries: Marshall Islands; Micronesia	
Jordan	Amman	Embassy	Countries: Iraq; Lebanon	
Kazakhstan	Astana	Embassy	Countries: Kyrgyzstan	
Kuwait	Kuwait City	Embassy		
Malaysia	Kuala Lumpur	Embassy	Countries: Brunei; Cambodia; Laos; Myanmar	
Qatar	Doha	Embassy		
Saudi Arabia	Riyadh	Embassy	Countries: Bahrain; Oman; Yemen; International Organizations: Organisation of Islamic Cooperation	
South Korea	Seoul	Embassy		
Turkey	Ankara	Embassy	Countries: Albania; Algeria; Bosnia and Herzegovina; Mauritania; Sudan	
Turkey	Istanbul	Consulate-General	Countries: Albania; Algeria; Bosnia and Herzegovina; Mauritania; Sudan	
Turkey	Trabzon	Consulate-General	Countries: Albania; Algeria; Bosnia and Herzegovina; Mauritania; Sudan	
Turkmenistan	Ashgabat	Embassy	Countries: Afghanistan	
United Arab Emirates	Abu Dhabi	Embassy		
Uzbekistan	Tashkent	Embassy	Countries: Tajikistan	

=== Europe ===
Host country	Host city	Mission	Concurrent accreditation	Ref.
Austria	Vienna	Embassy	International Organizations: Organization for Security and Co-operation in Europe; United Nations	
Belarus	Minsk	Embassy		
Belgium	Brussels	Embassy	Countries: Luxembourg; International Organizations: European Union	
Bulgaria	Sofia	Embassy		
Croatia	Zagreb	Embassy		
Cyprus	Nicosia	Embassy		
Czech Republic	Prague	Embassy		
Denmark	Copenhagen	Embassy	Countries: Iceland	
Estonia	Tallinn	Embassy		
Finland	Helsinki	Embassy		
France	Paris	Embassy	Countries: Monaco; International Organizations: UNESCO	
Germany	Berlin	Embassy		
Greece	Athens	Embassy	Countries: Serbia	
Greece	Thessaloniki	Consulate-General	Countries: Serbia	
Holy See (Note: The Georgian Embassy to the Holy See is located outside Vatican territory in Rome.)	Rome	Embassy	Sovereign entity: Sovereign Military Order of Malta	
Hungary	Budapest	Embassy	Countries: Montenegro	
Ireland	Dublin	Embassy		
Italy	Rome	Embassy	Countries: Malta; San Marino; International Organizations: Food and Agriculture Organization; International Fund for Agricultural Development; World Food Programme	
Latvia	Riga	Embassy		
Lithuania	Vilnius	Embassy		
Moldova	Chișinău	Embassy		
Netherlands	The Hague	Embassy		
Norway	Oslo	Embassy		
Poland	Warsaw	Embassy		
Portugal	Lisbon	Embassy	Countries: São Tomé and Príncipe	
Romania	Bucharest	Embassy		
Russia	Moscow	Interests Section (Note: Under the protecting power of Switzerland.)		
Serbia	Belgrade	Embassy office (Note: Subordinate to the embassy in Athens, Greece.)		
Slovakia	Bratislava	Embassy		
Slovenia	Ljubljana	Embassy		
Spain	Madrid	Embassy	Countries: Andorra; Morocco	
Spain	Barcelona	Consulate-General	Countries: Andorra; Morocco	
Sweden	Stockholm	Embassy		
Switzerland	Bern	Embassy	Countries: Liechtenstein	
Ukraine	Kyiv	Embassy	International Organizations: GUAM Organization for Democracy and Economic Development	
Ukraine	Odesa	Consulate-General	International Organizations: GUAM Organization for Democracy and Economic Development	
Ukraine	Donetsk	Consulate	International Organizations: GUAM Organization for Democracy and Economic Development	
United Kingdom	London	Embassy	International Organizations: International Maritime Organization	

=== Oceania ===
Host country	Host city	Mission	Concurrent accreditation	Ref.
Australia	Canberra	Embassy	Countries: Fiji; Kiribati; New Zealand; Papua New Guinea; Samoa; Solomon Islands; Tonga; Tuvalu; Vanuatu	

=== Multilateral organizations ===
Organization	Host city	Host country	Mission	Concurrent accreditation	Ref.
Council of Europe	Strasbourg	France	Permanent Mission		
NATO	Brussels	Belgium	Representation		
United Nations	New York City	United States	Permanent Mission		
United Nations	Geneva	Switzerland	Permanent Mission		

== Gallery ==
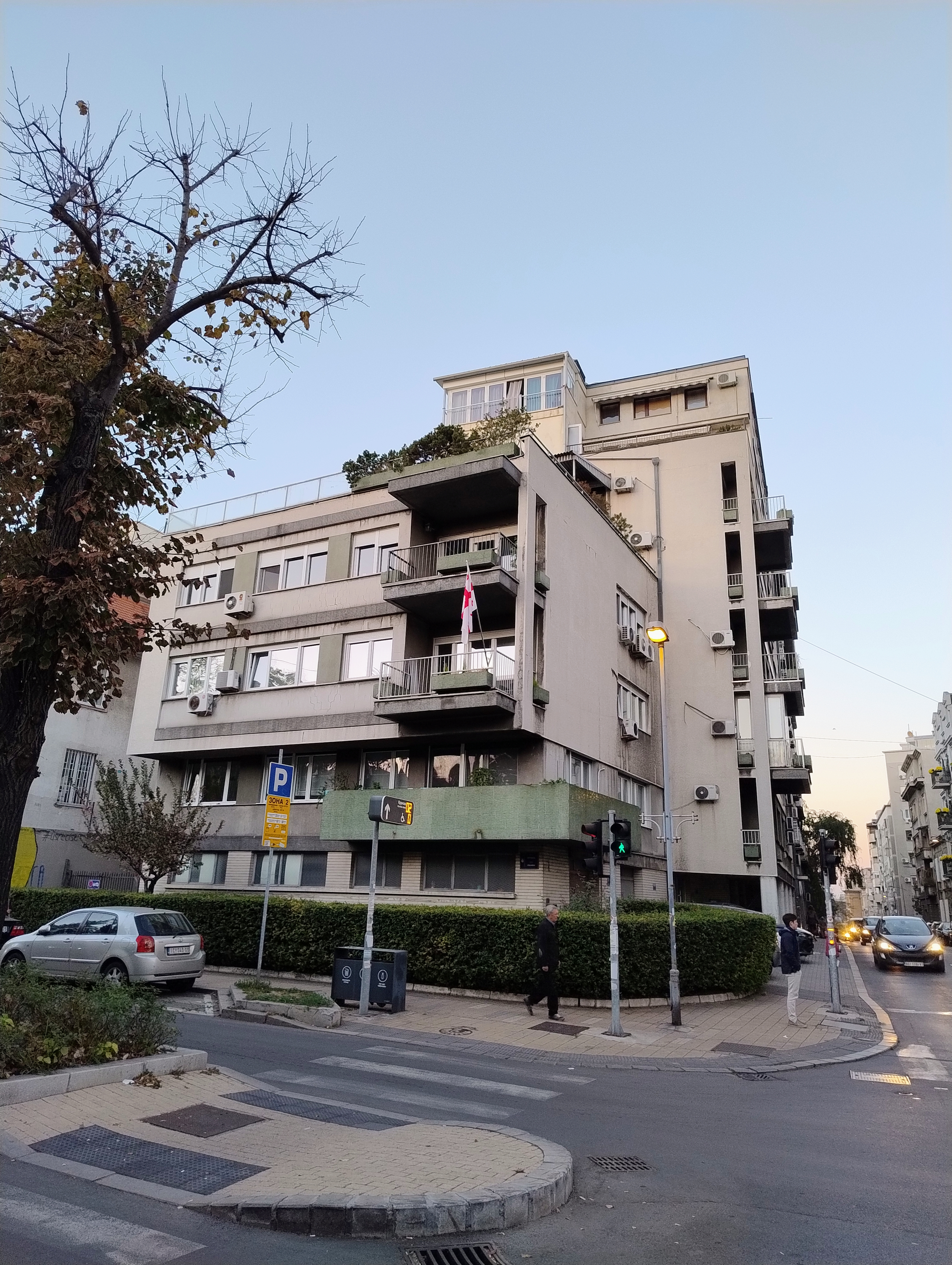
Embassy in Belgrade

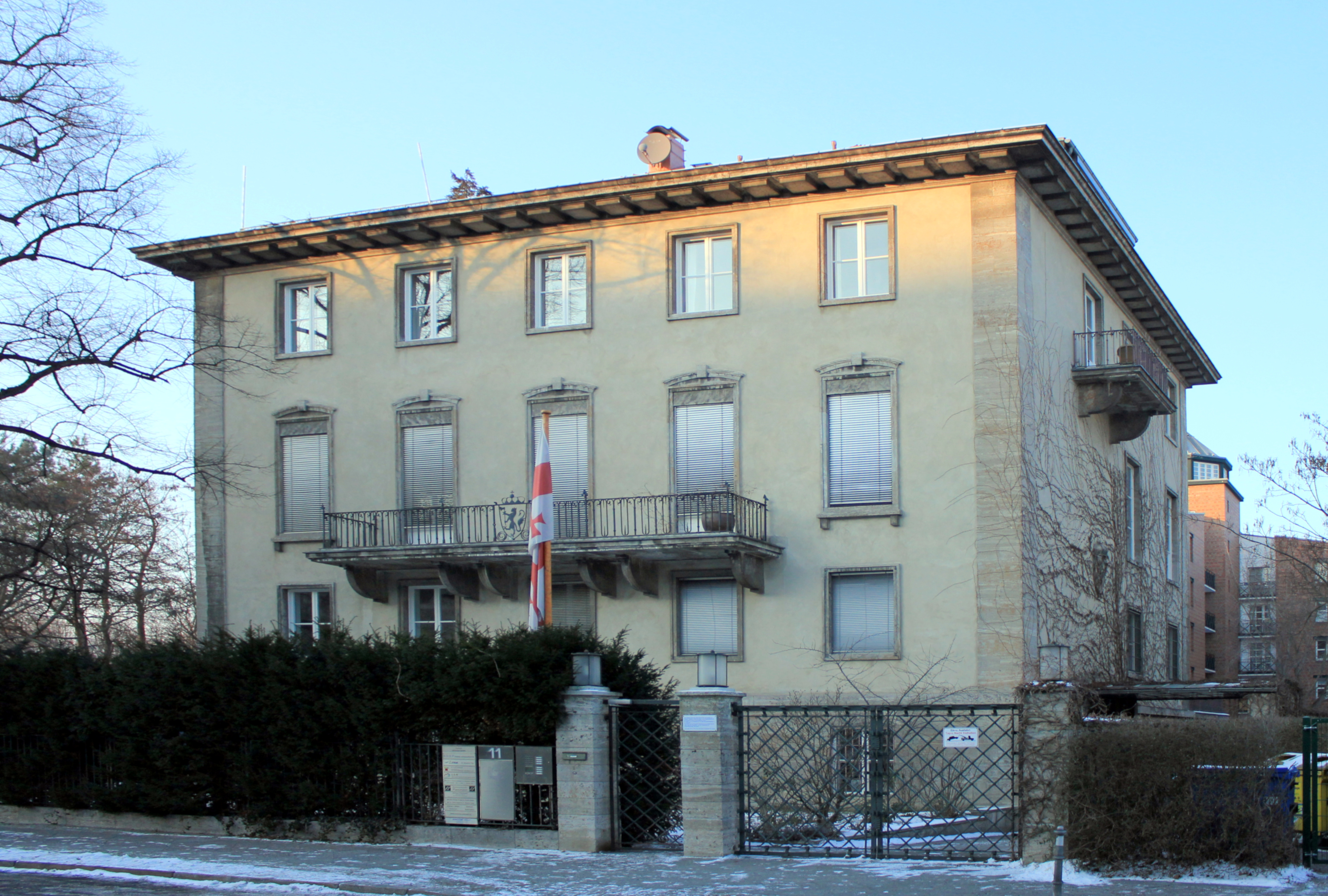
Embassy in Berlin

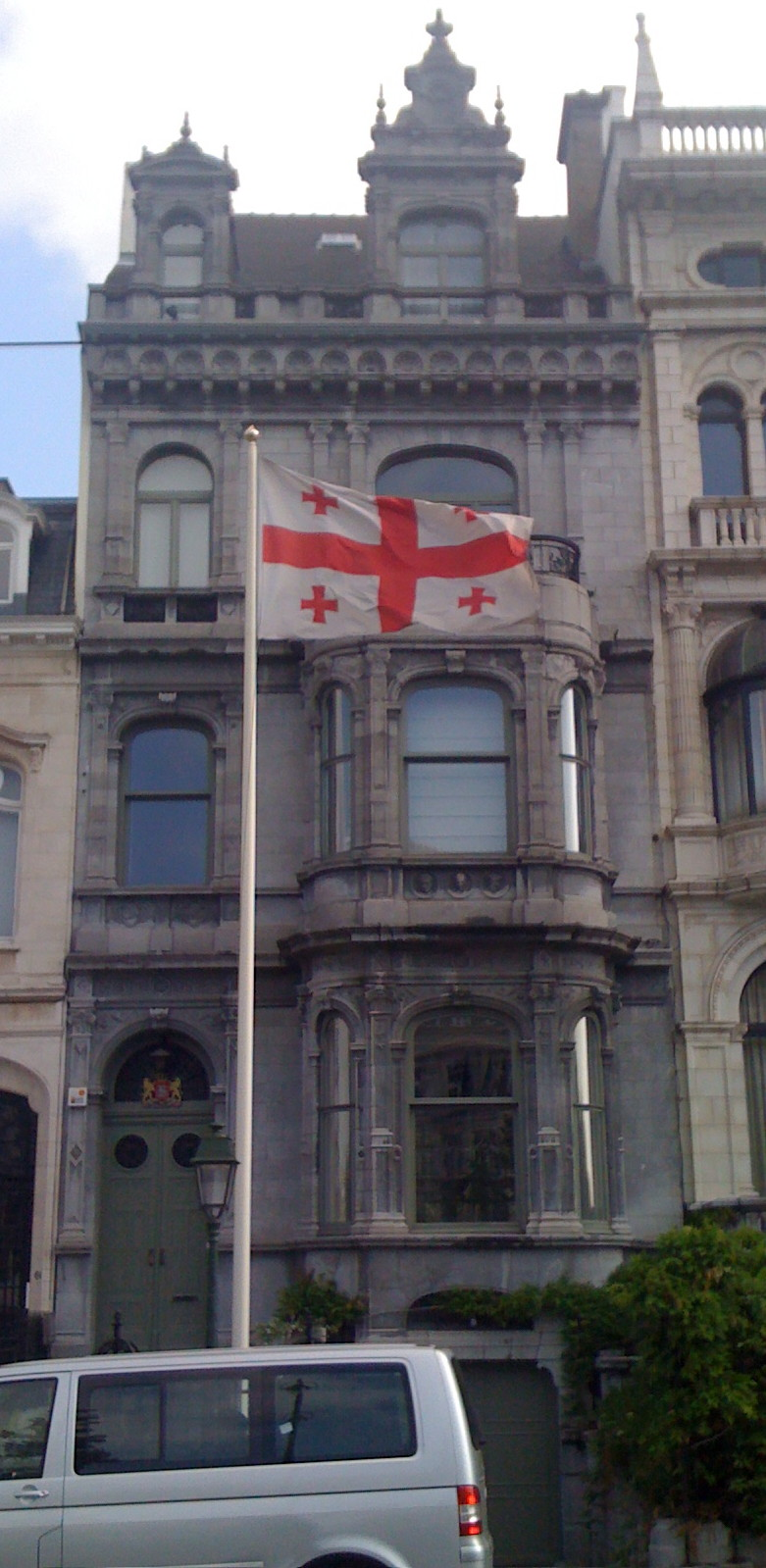
Embassy in Brussels

Embassy in Chisinau

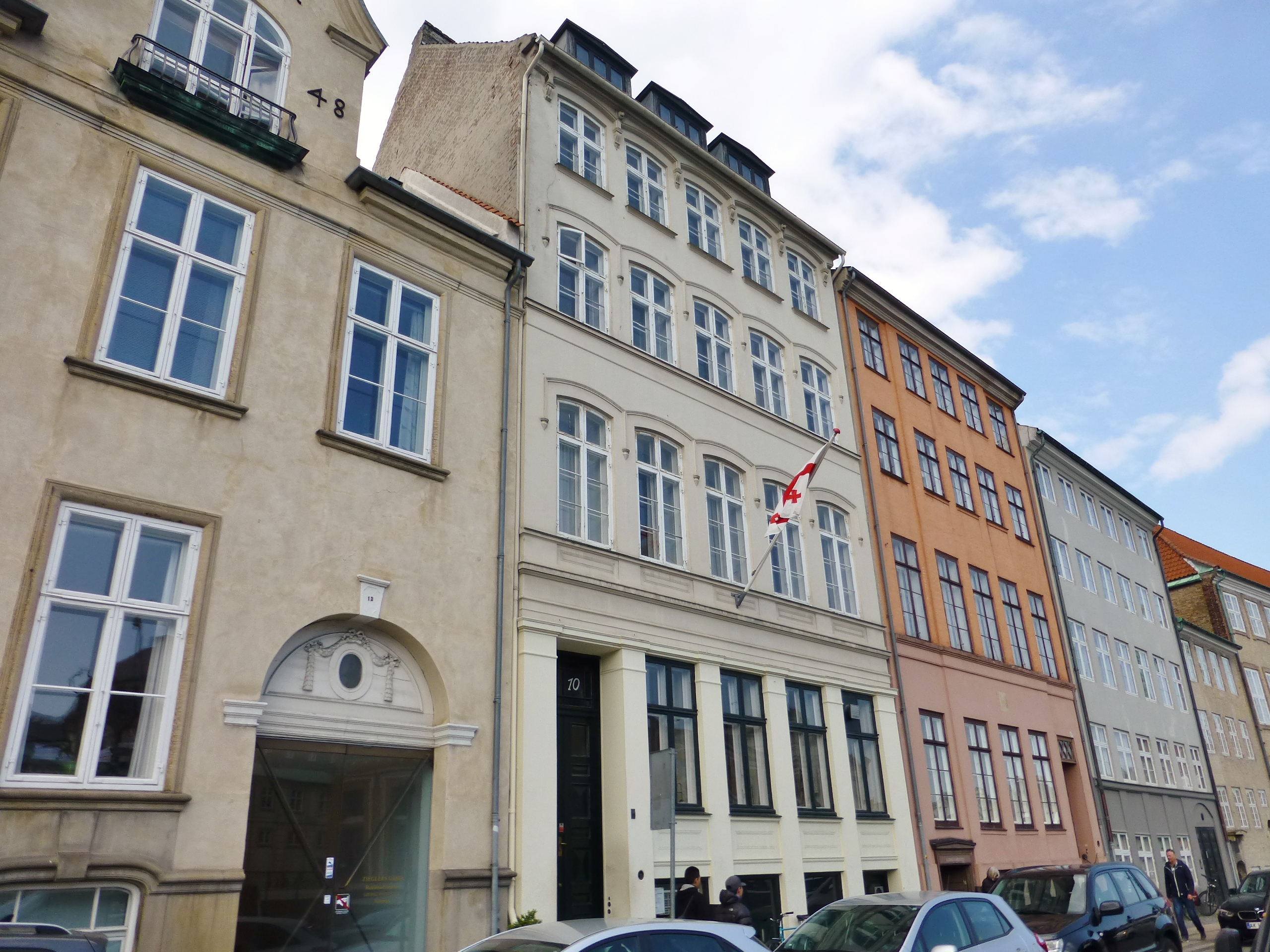
Embassy in Copenhagen

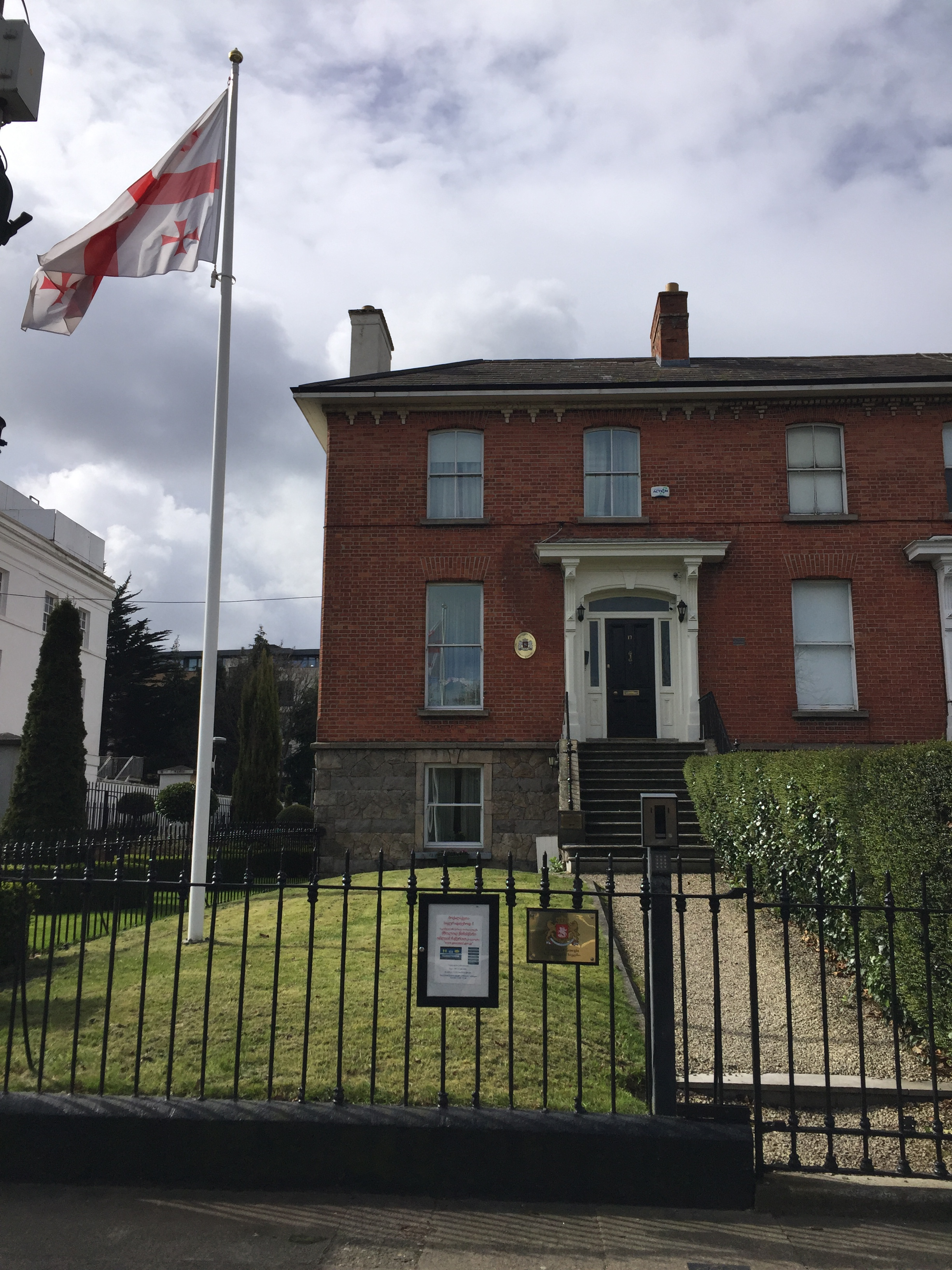
Embassy in Dublin

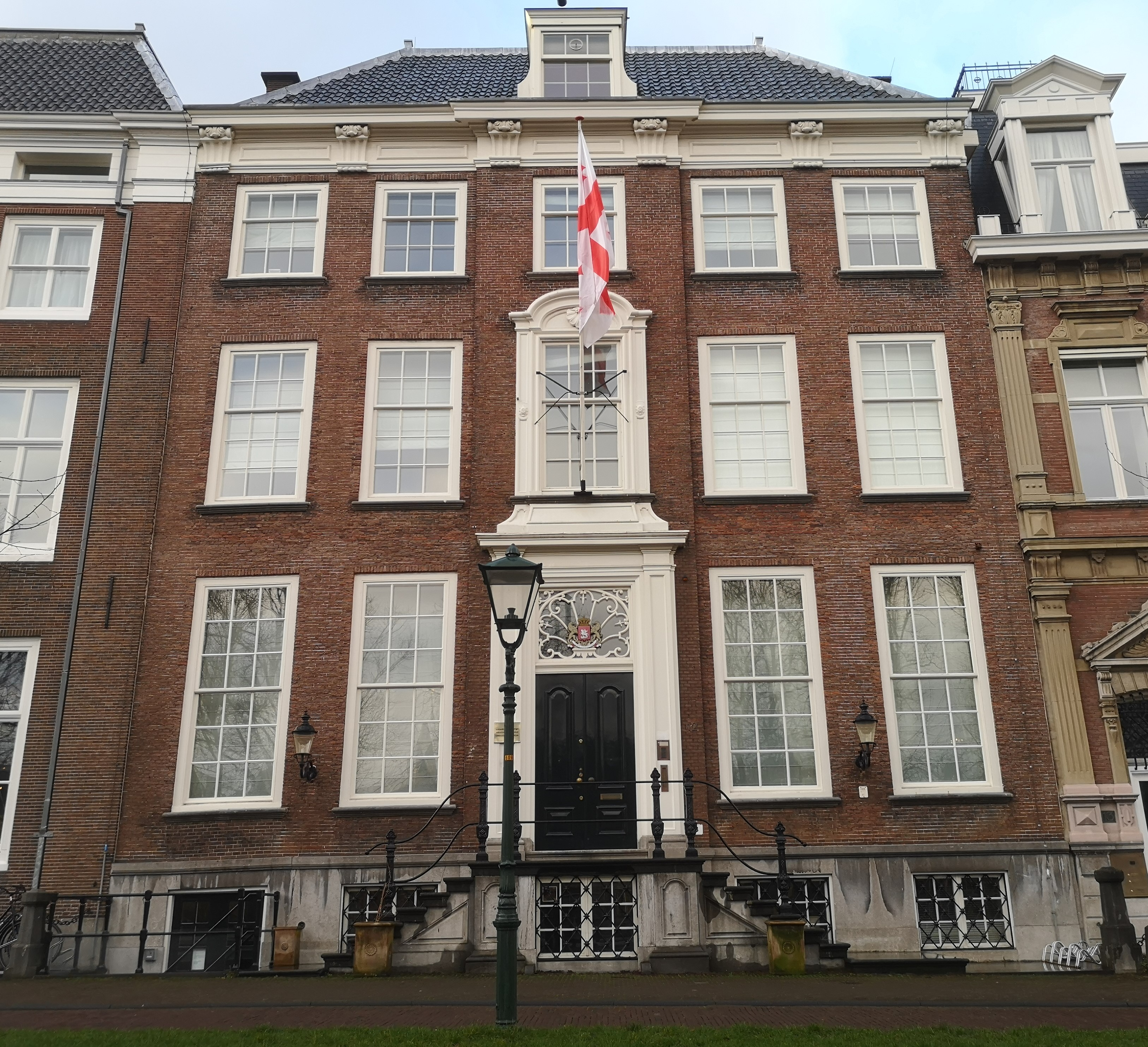
Embassy in The Hague

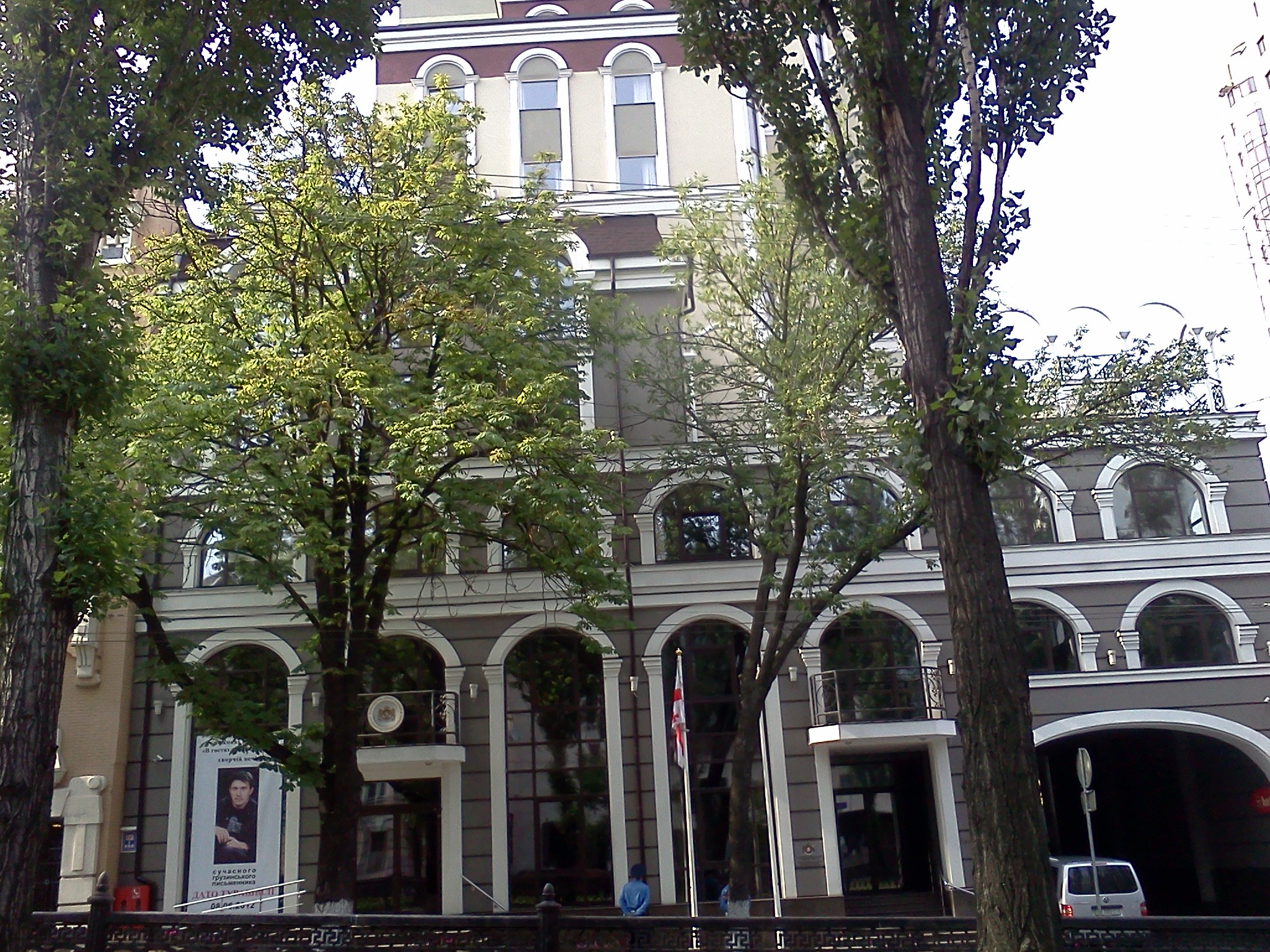
Embassy in Kyiv

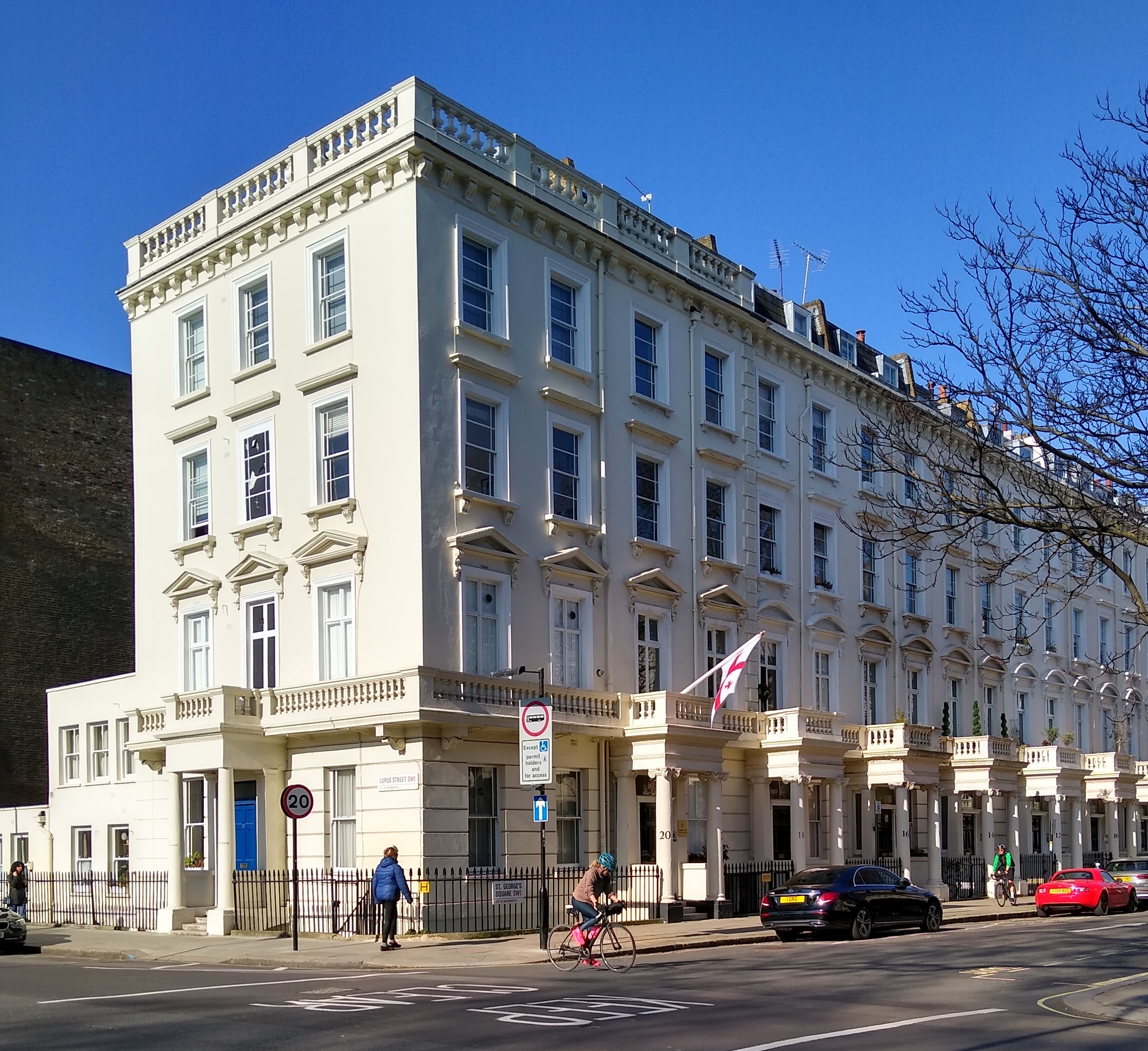
Embassy in London

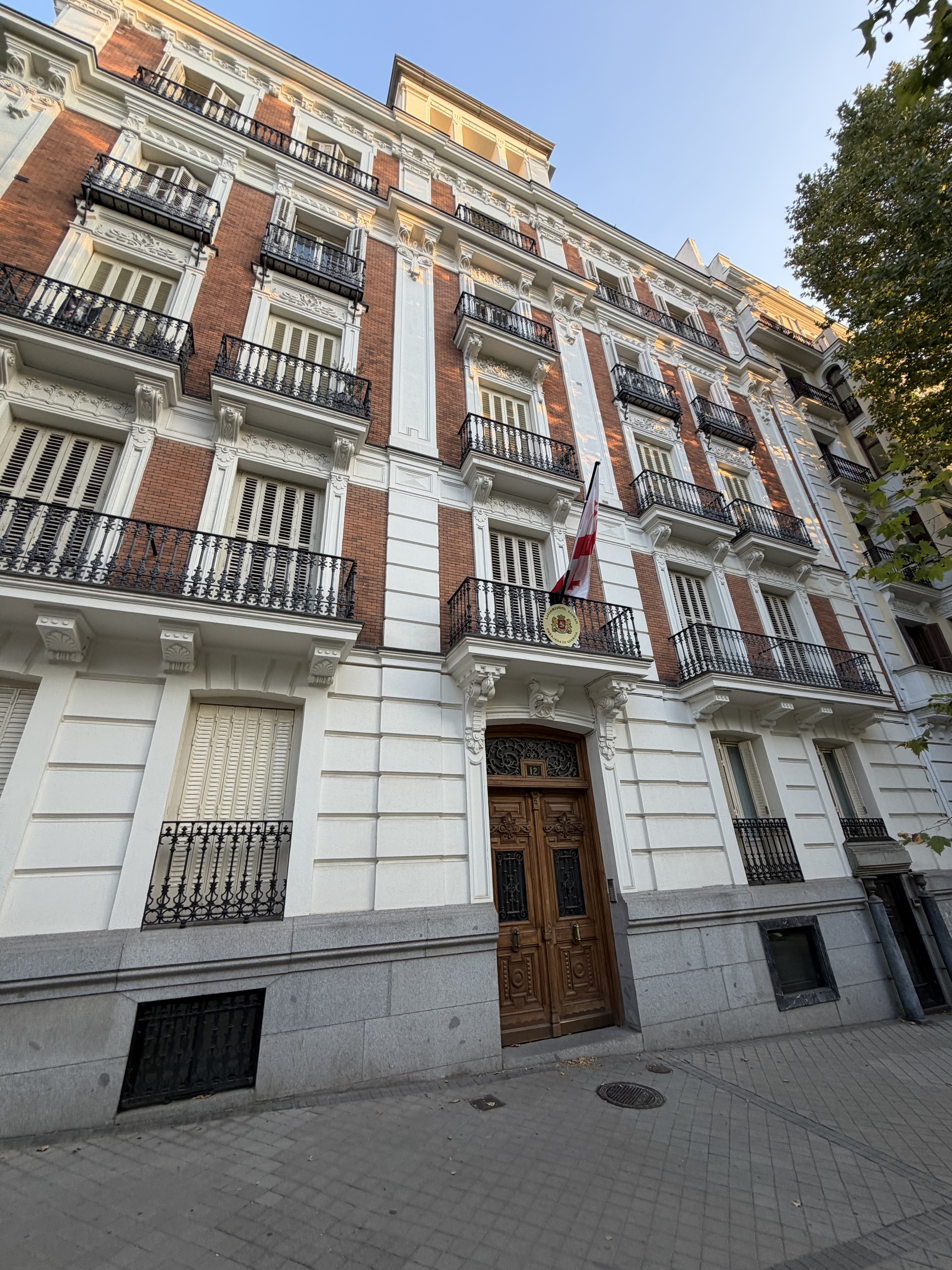
Embassy in Madrid

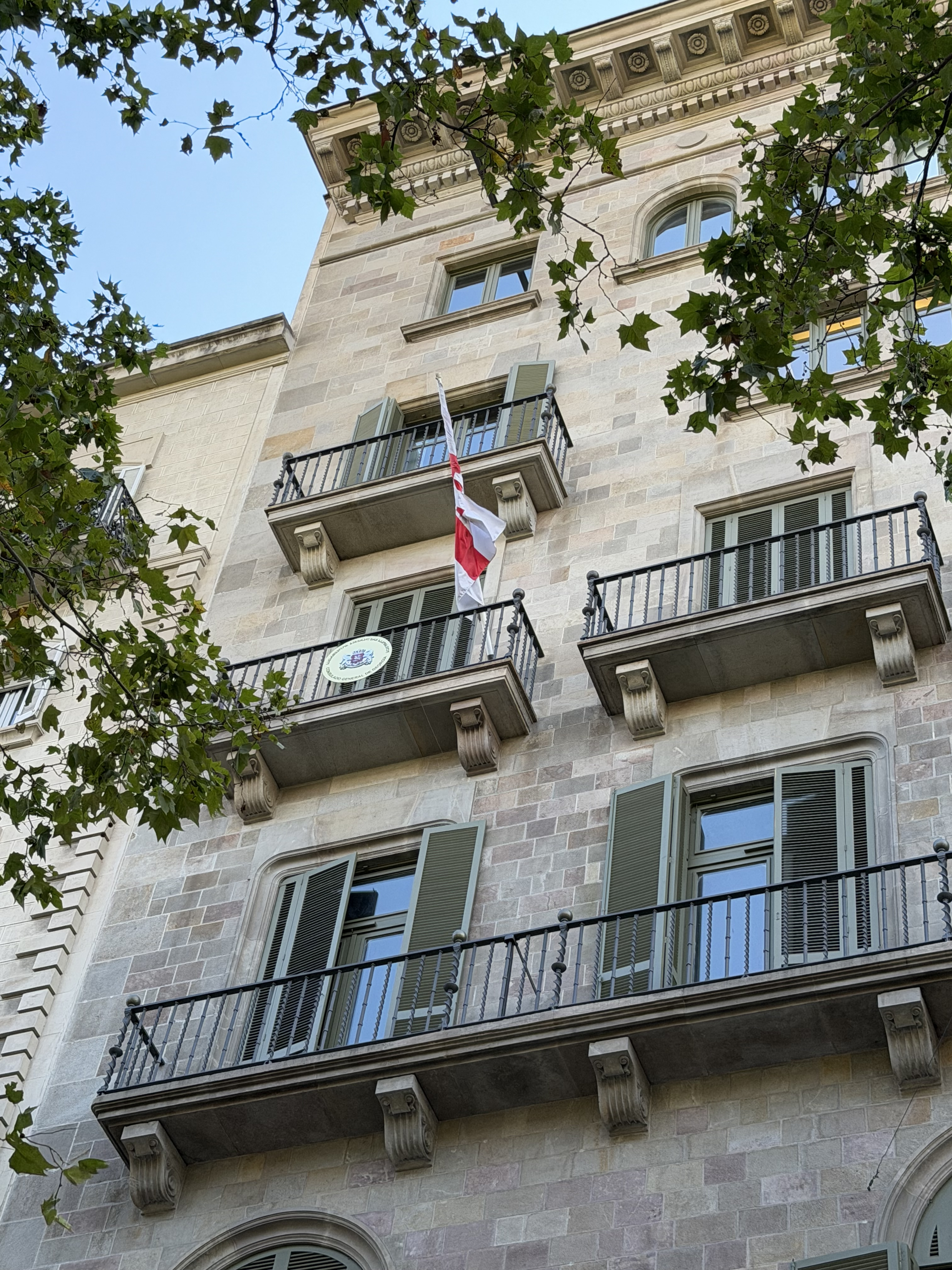
Consulate-General in Barcelona

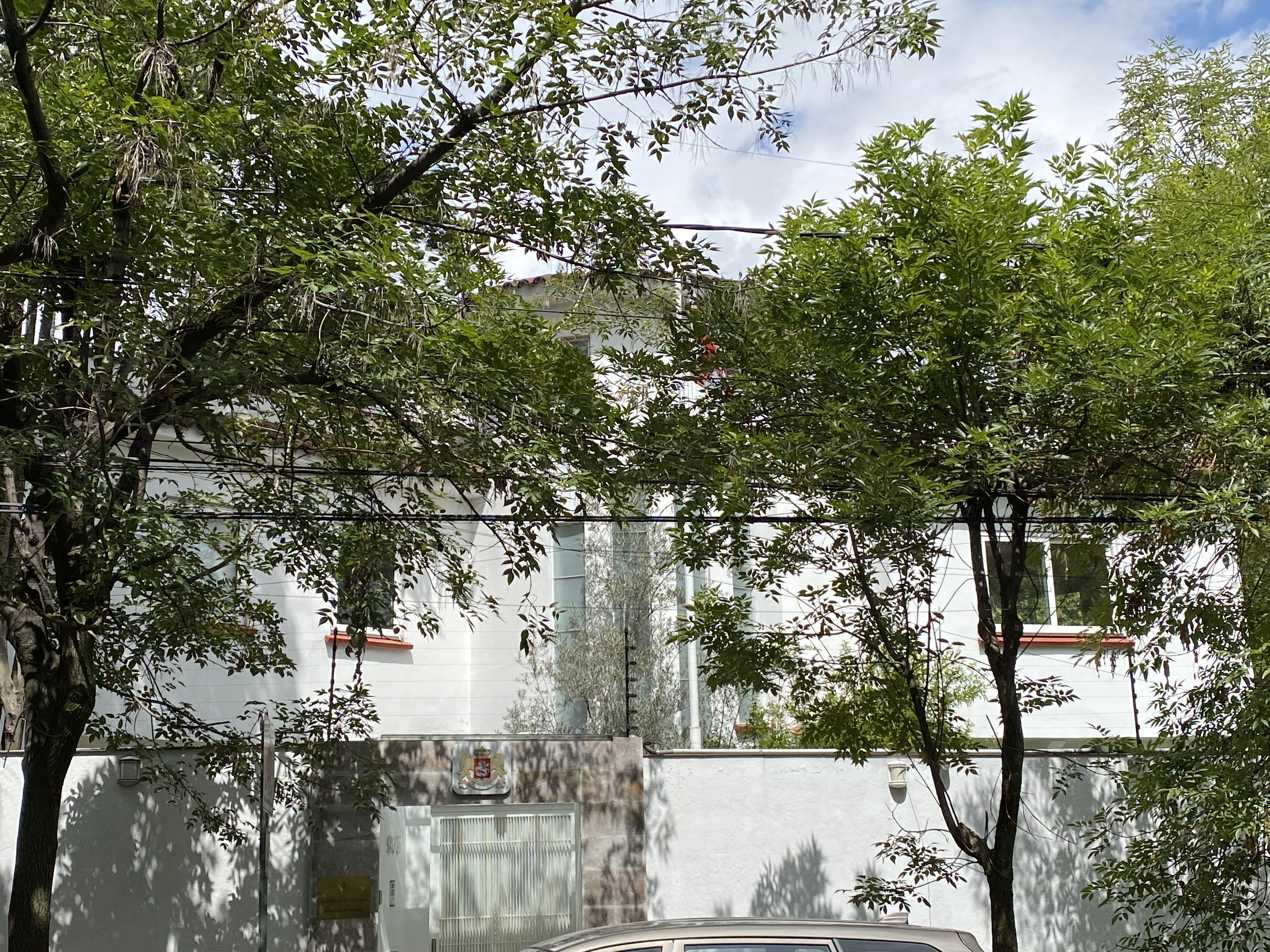
Embassy in Mexico City

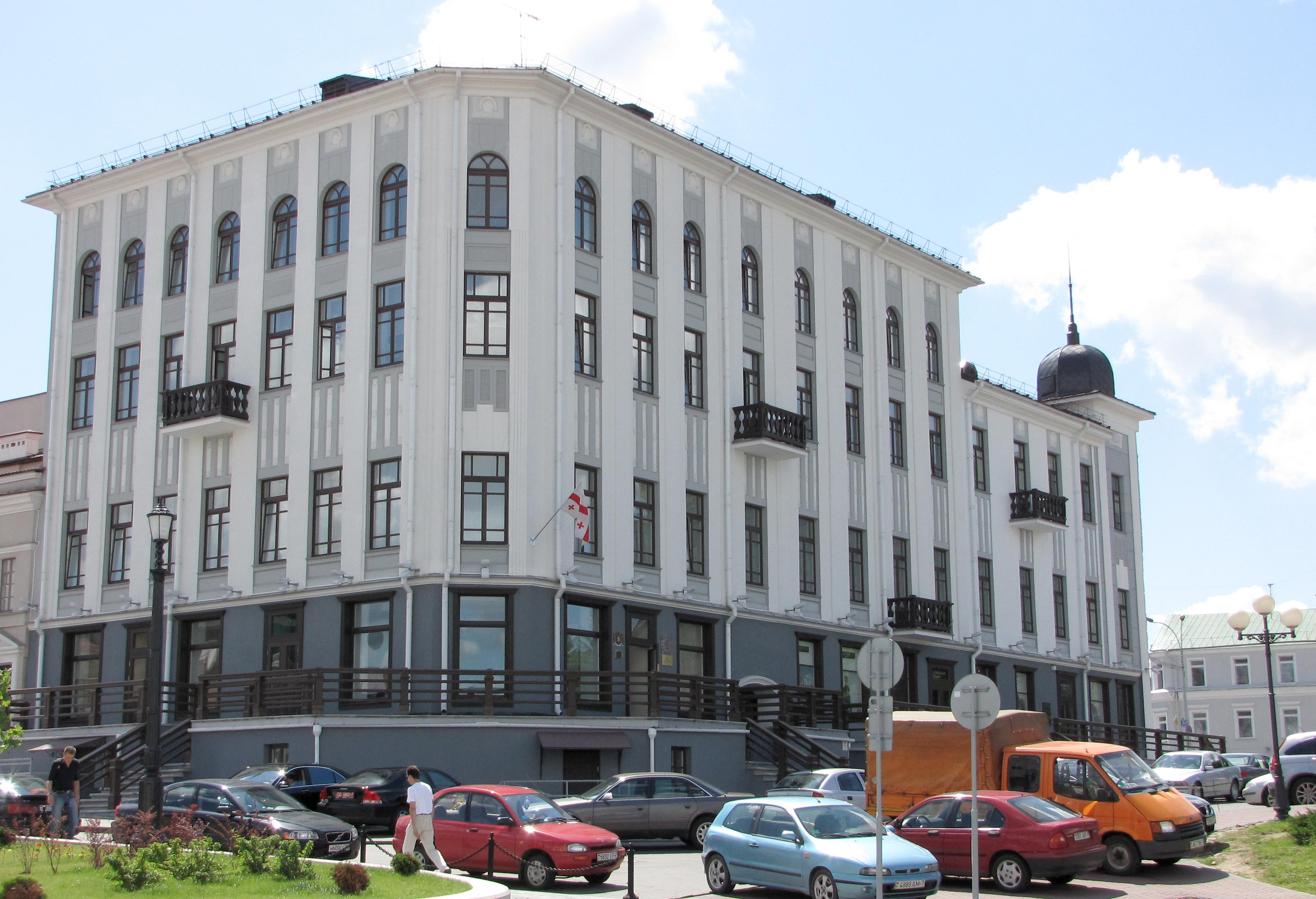
Embassy in Minsk

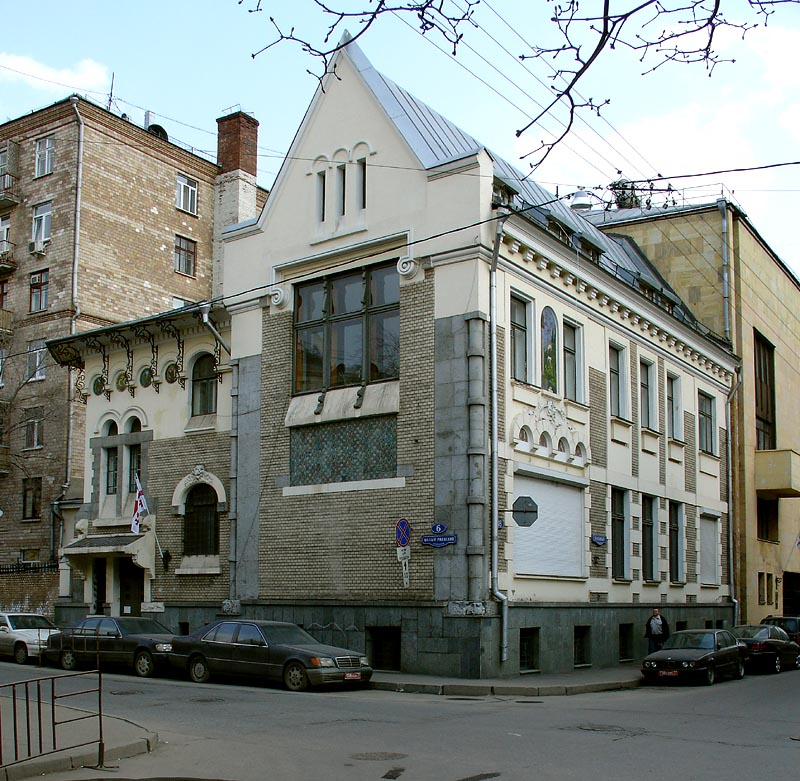
Interest Section in Moscow

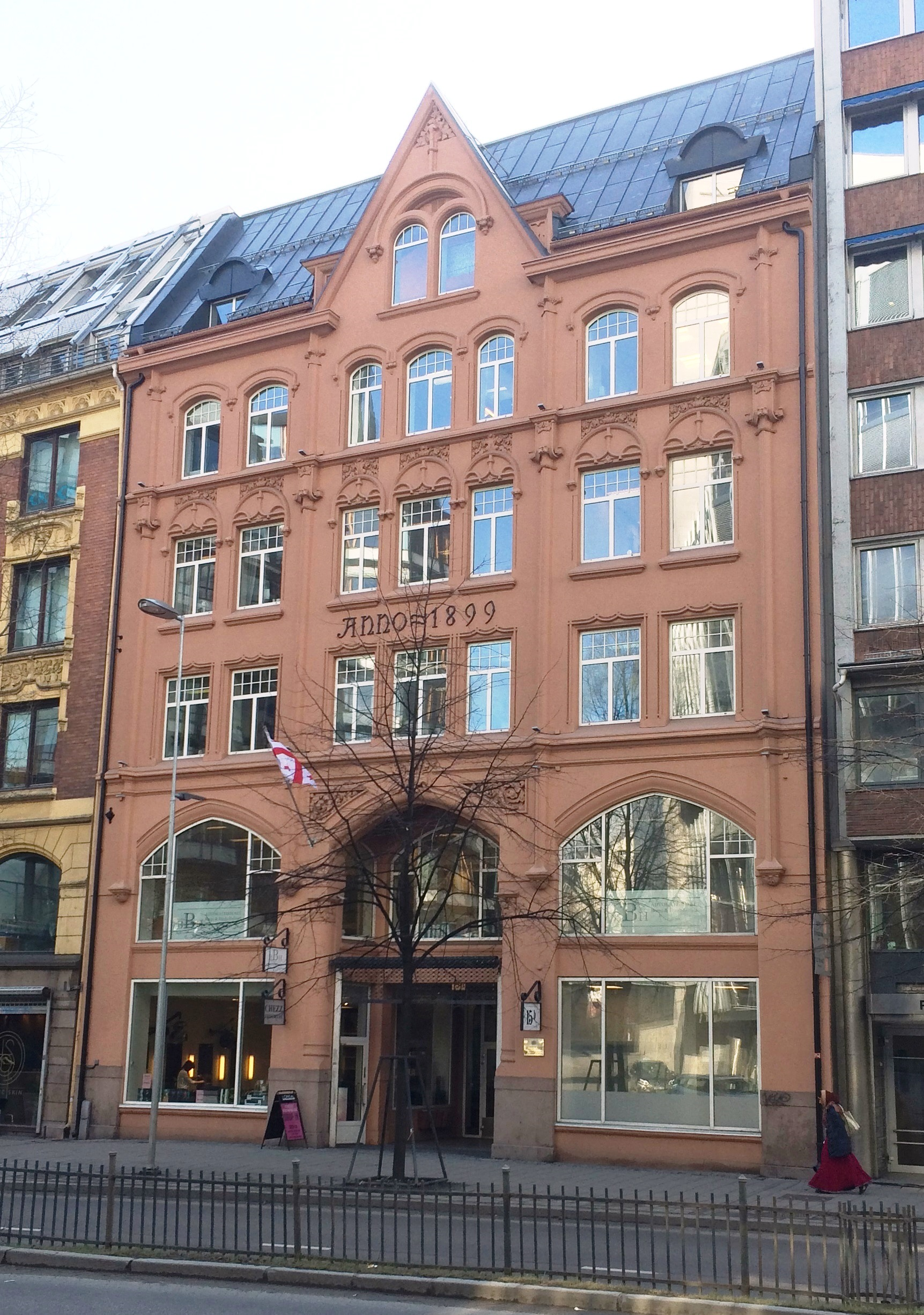
Embassy in Oslo

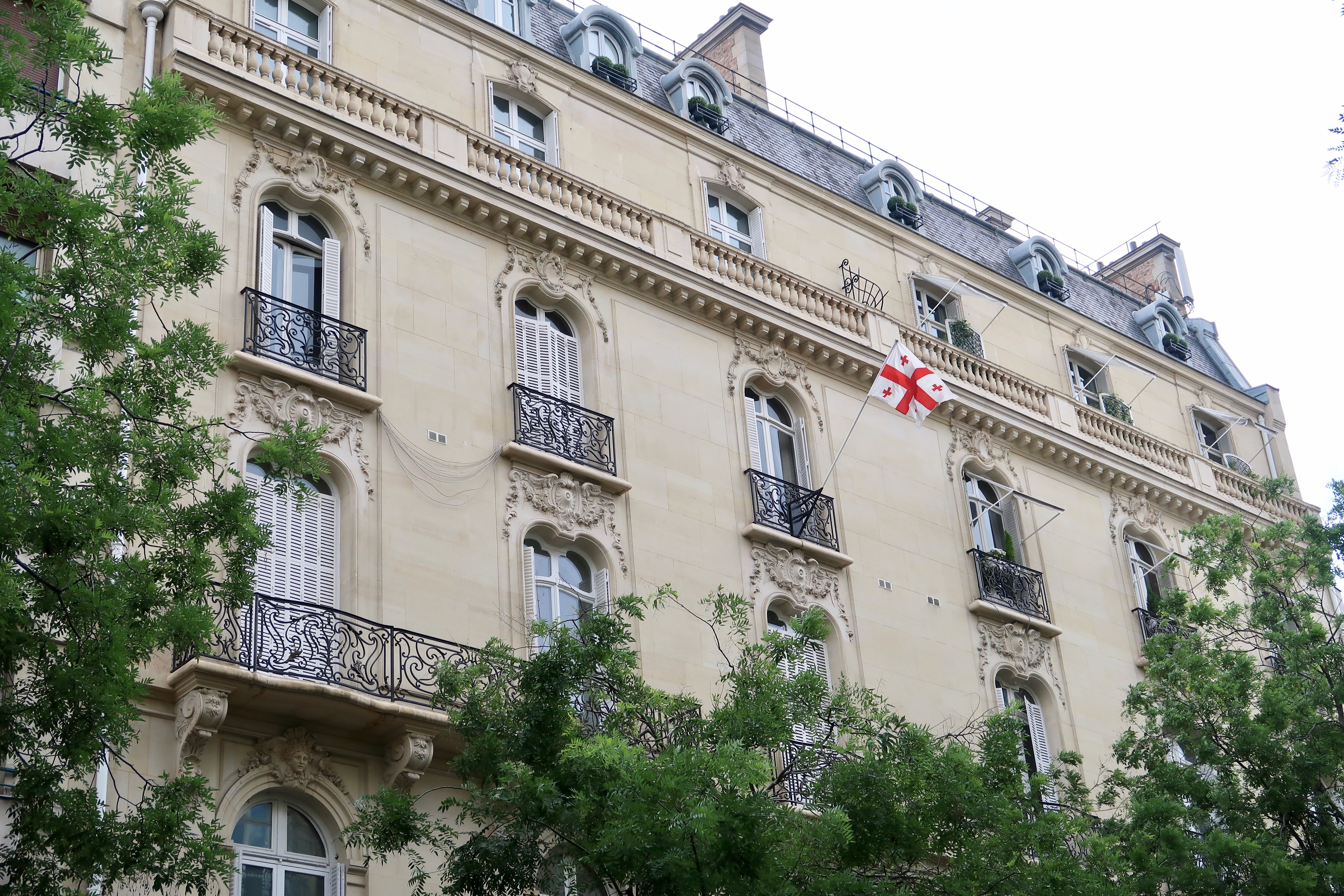
Embassy in Paris

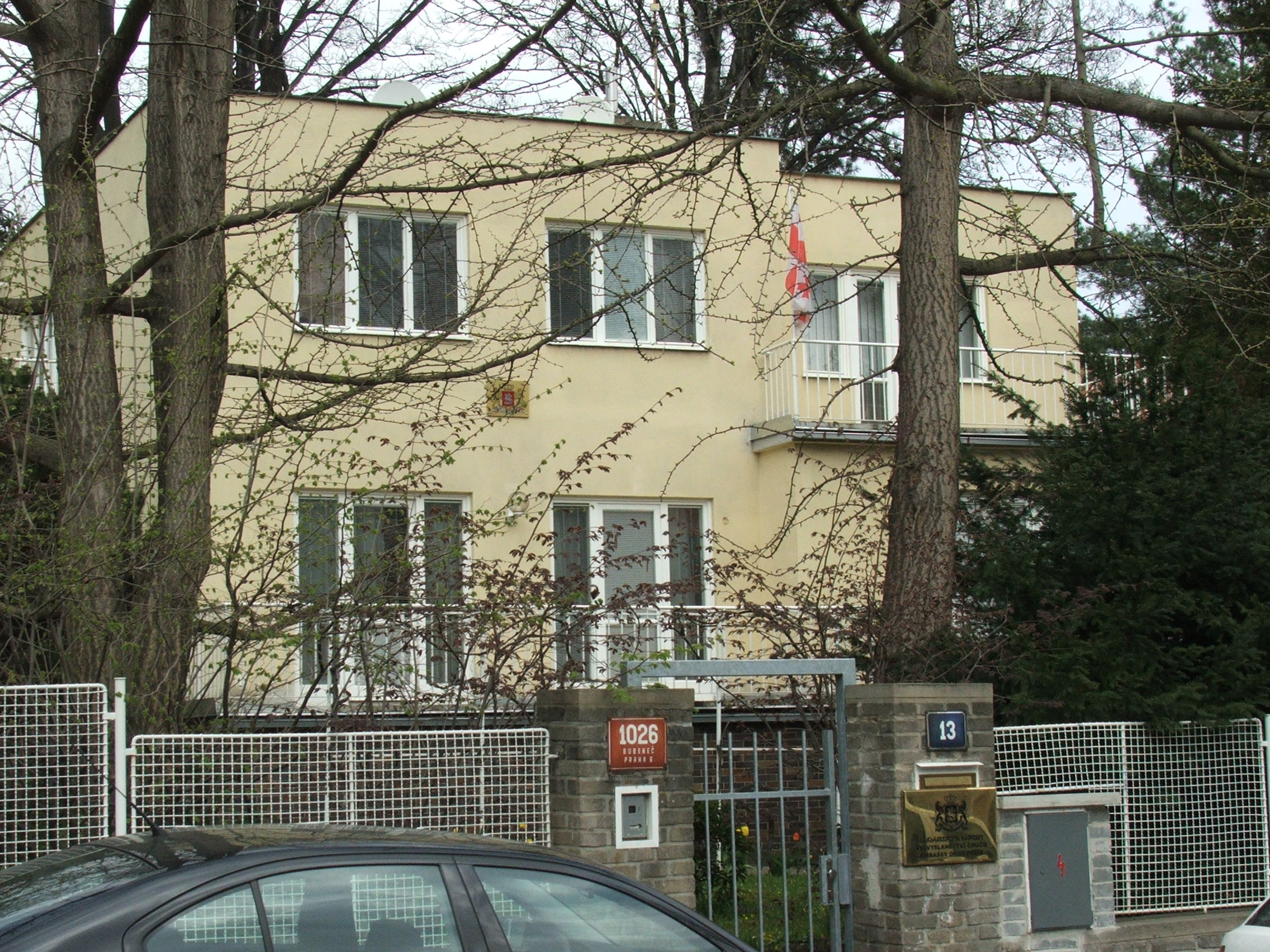
Embassy in Prague

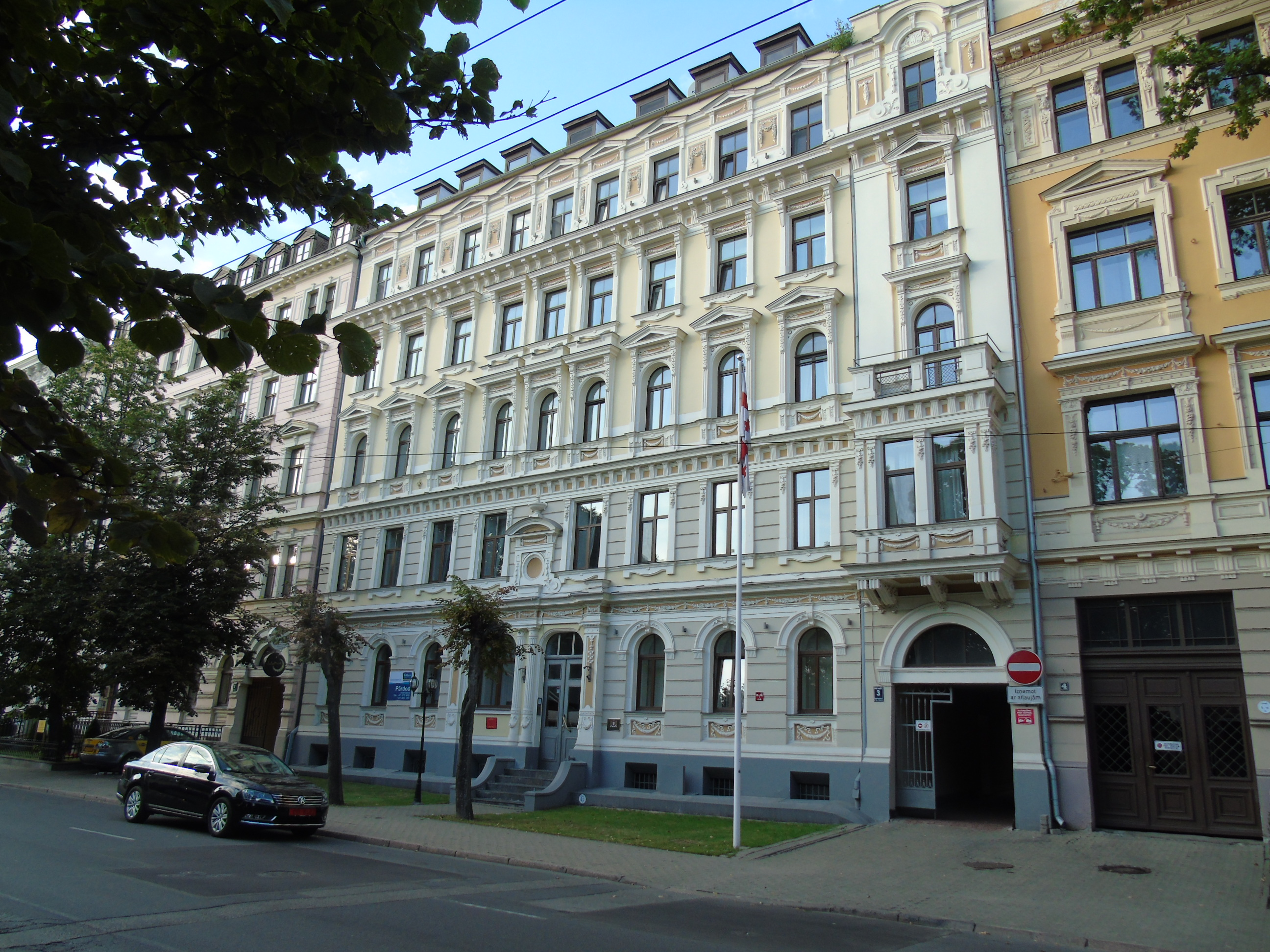
Building hosting the Embassy in Riga

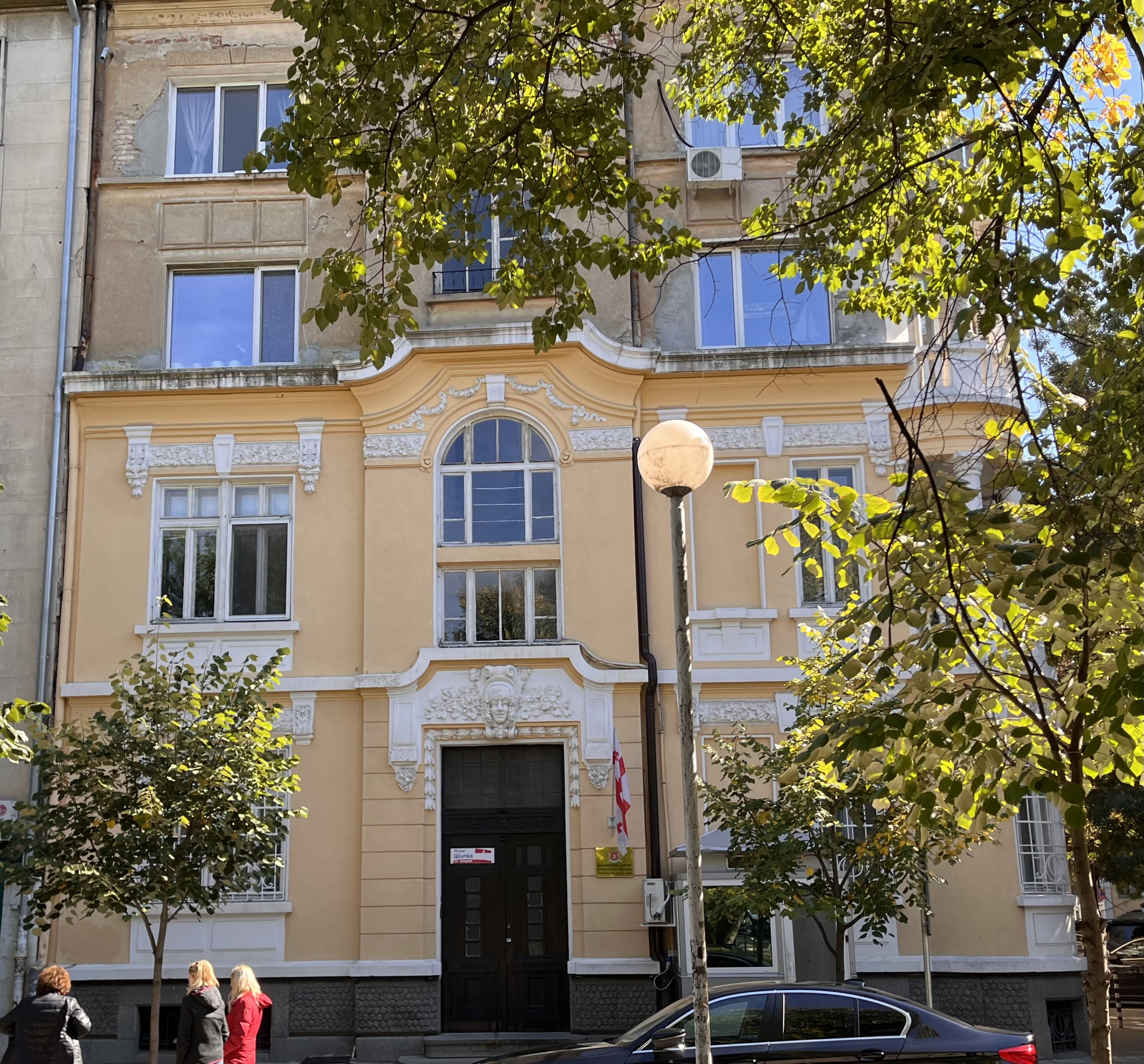
Embassy in Sofia

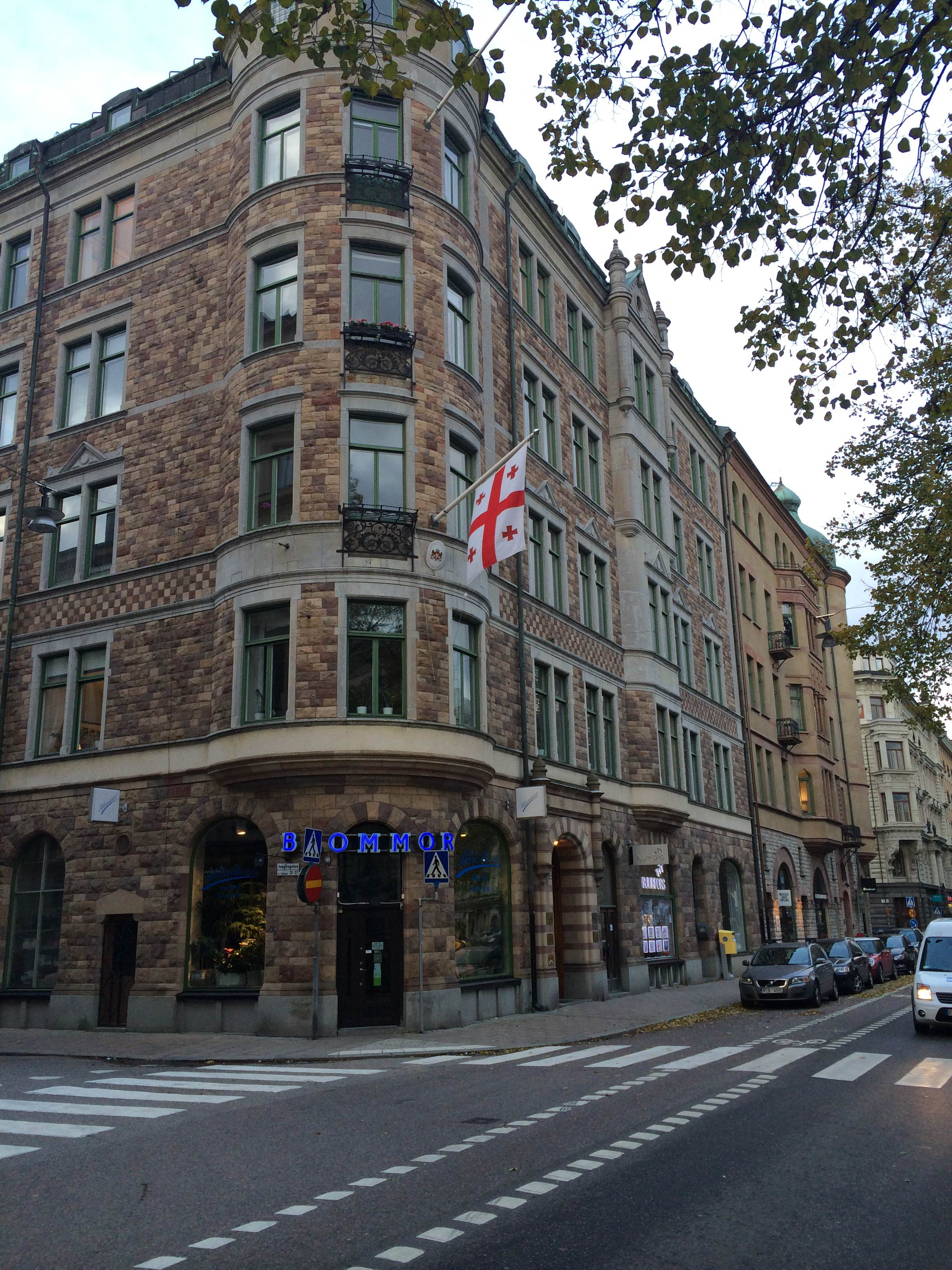
Building hosting the Embassy in Stockholm

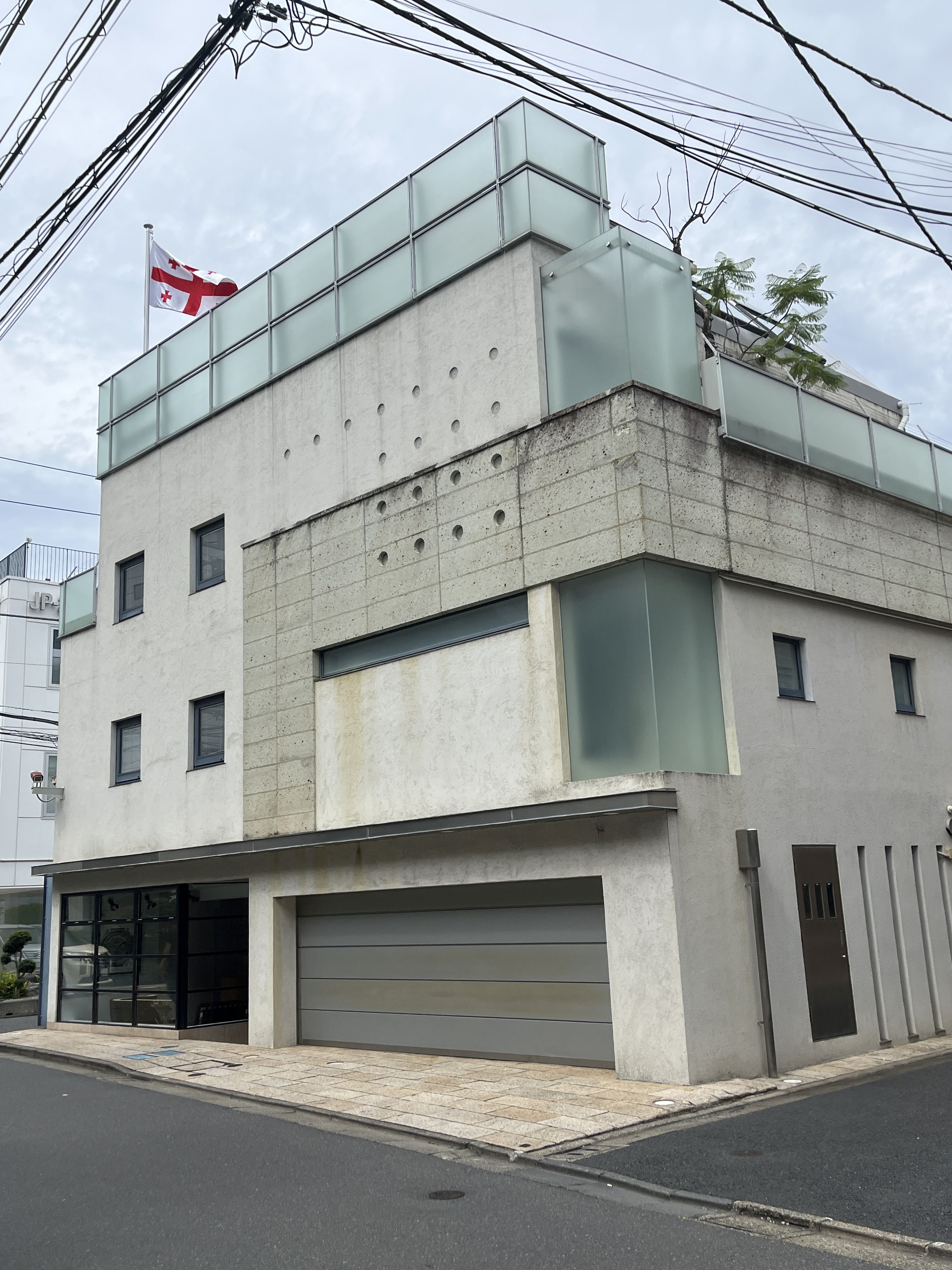
Embassy in Tokyo

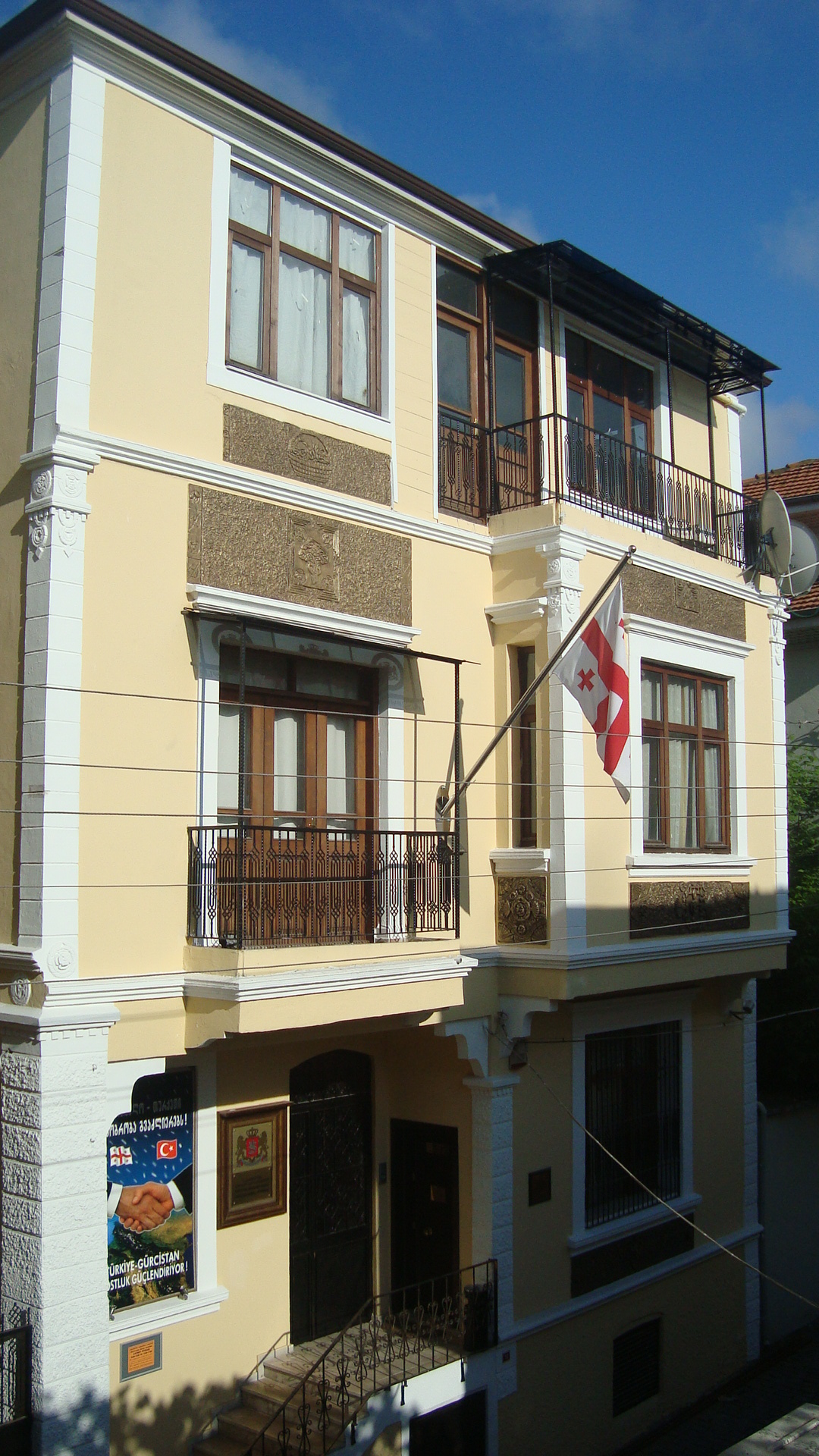
Consulate-General in Trabzon

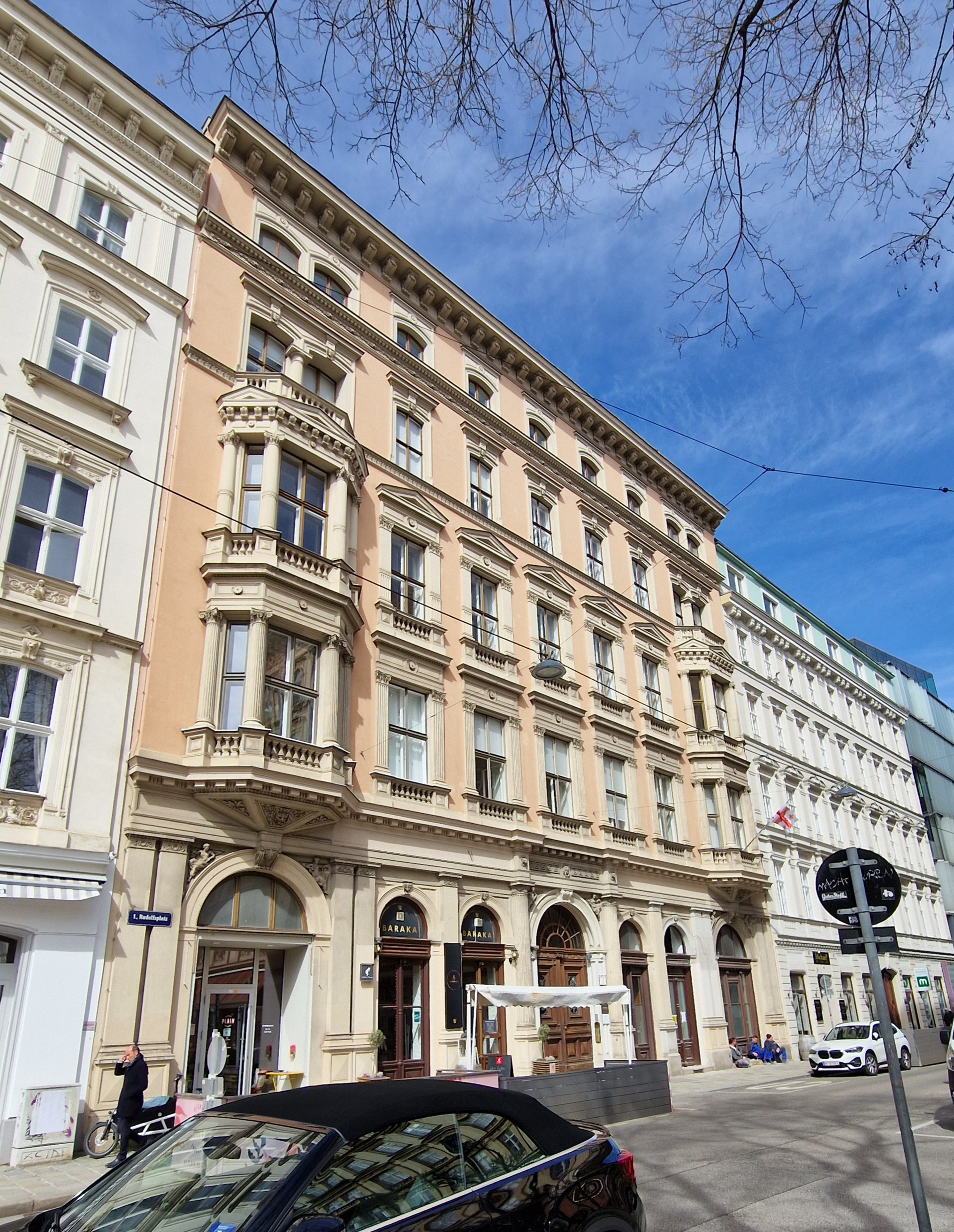
Embassy in Vienna

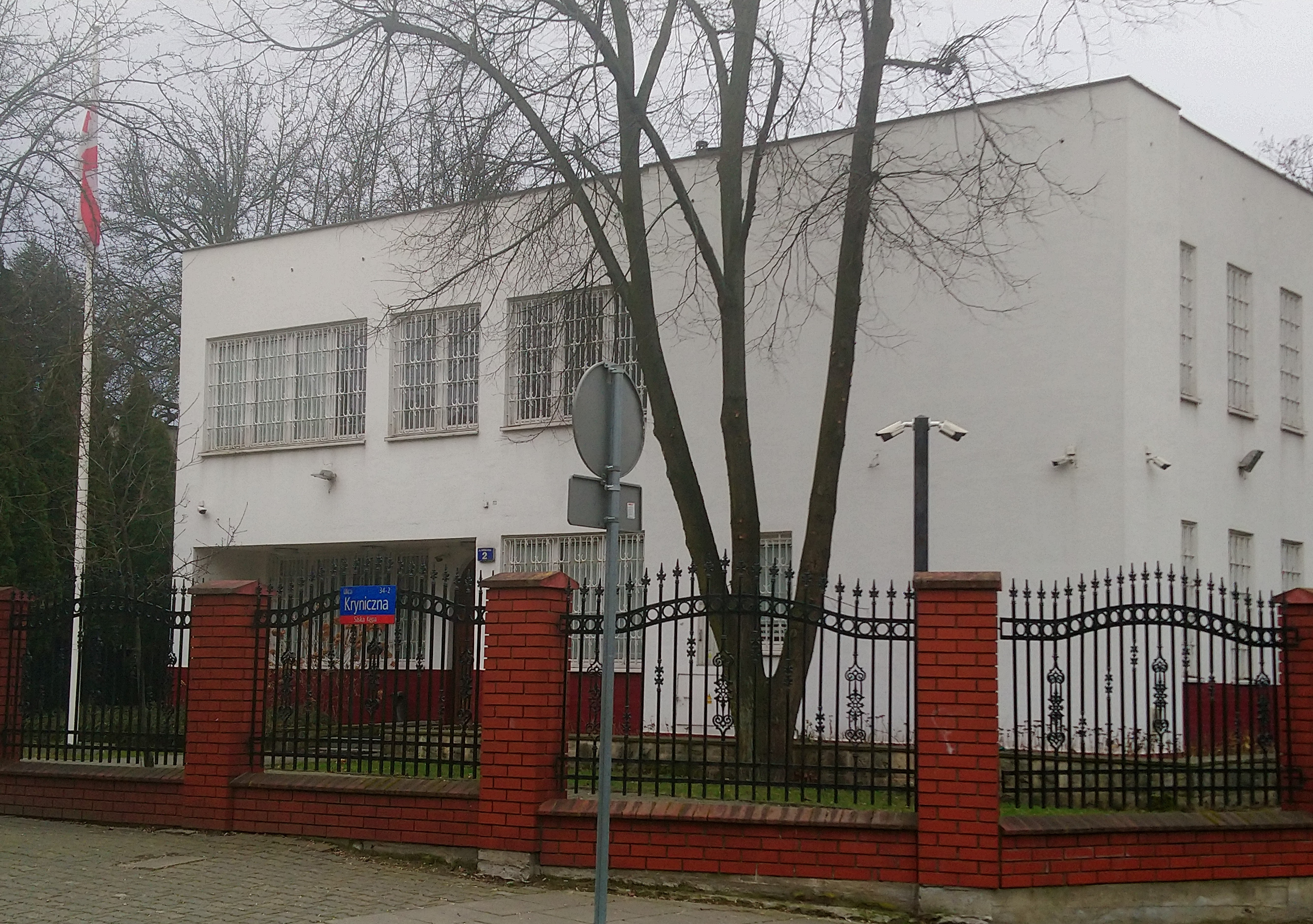
Embassy in Warsaw

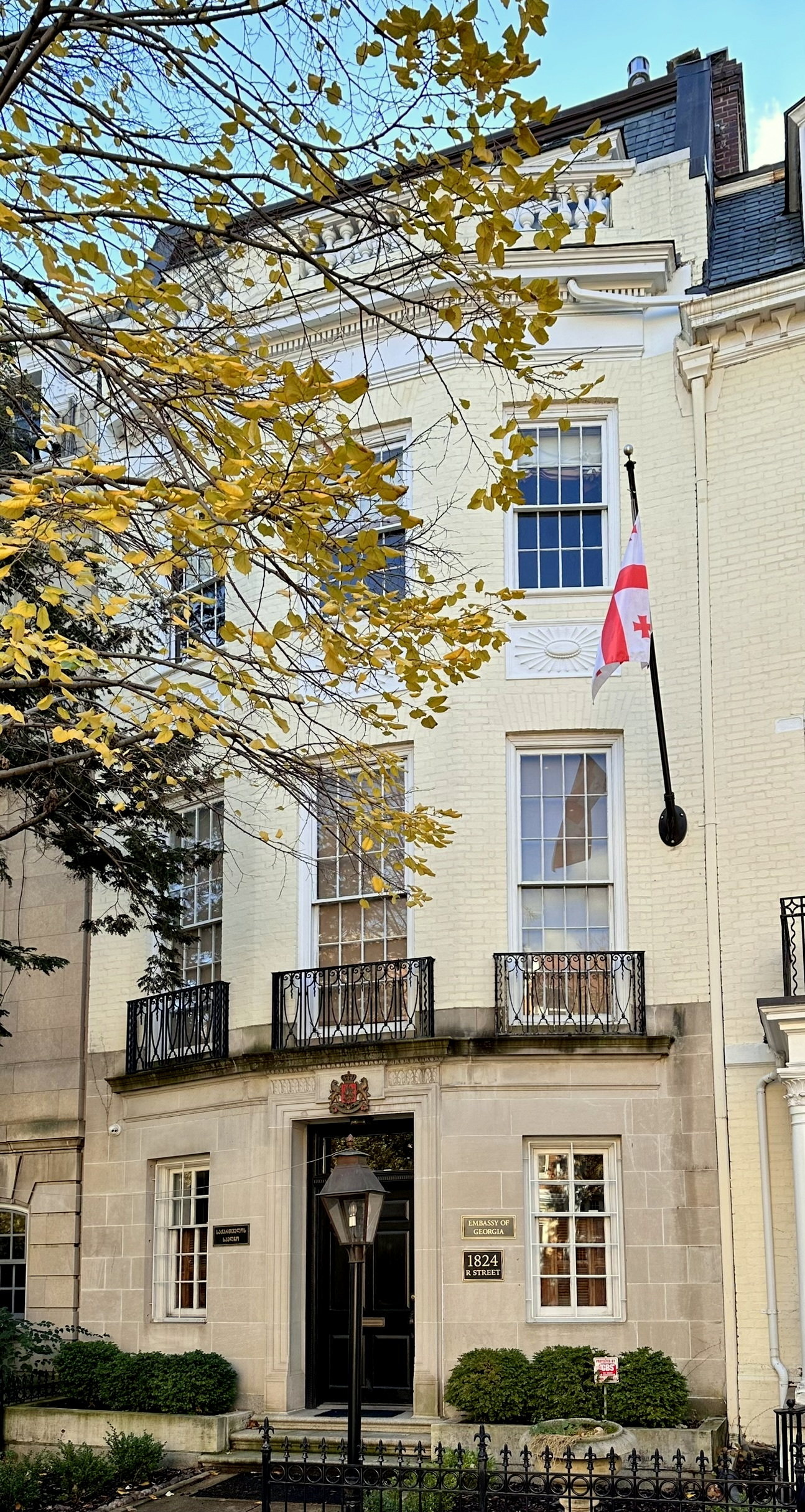
Embassy in Washington, D.C.

== Closed missions ==
=== Asia ===
Host country	Host city	Mission	Year closed	Ref.
Iraq	Baghdad	Embassy (Note: Resident in Amman, Jordan)	Unknown	

== See also ==
- Foreign relations of Georgia
- Visa policy of Georgia
