= Georgia–Netherlands relations =

- Georgia: Netherlands

Diplomatic mission
- Embassy of Georgia, The Hague: Embassy of the Netherlands, Tbilisi

Georgia–Netherlands relations are the bilateral and diplomatic relations between Georgia and the Netherlands. Georgia has an embassy in The Hague, which opened in 2007. The Netherlands has an embassy in Tbilisi since 2001. The countries established diplomatic relations on 22 April 1992. Both countries are full members of the Council of Europe. the Netherlands is a member of the European Union, which Georgia applied for in 2022.

== History ==
During World War II, in 1945, the German-occupied Dutch island of Texel was the place of the Georgian uprising on Texel, a rebellion of Georgian soldiers, former prisoners of war, against Germany, with the Dutch resistance and regular civilians aiding the Georgians, and many Georgians and Dutch massacred by the Germans.

== Political relations ==
On January 21, 2020, Dutch Minister of Foreign Affairs Stef Blok visited Georgia, held bilateral meetings with the Georgian Foreign Minister, David Zalkaliani, visited the European Union Monitoring Mission office and visited the occupation line at Odzi.

== Embassies ==
The Embassy of Georgia is located in The Hague, the Netherlands. The Embassy of the Netherlands is located in Tbilisi, Georgia.

== Resident diplomatic missions ==
- Georgia has an embassy in The Hague.
- the Netherlands has an embassy in Tbilisi.
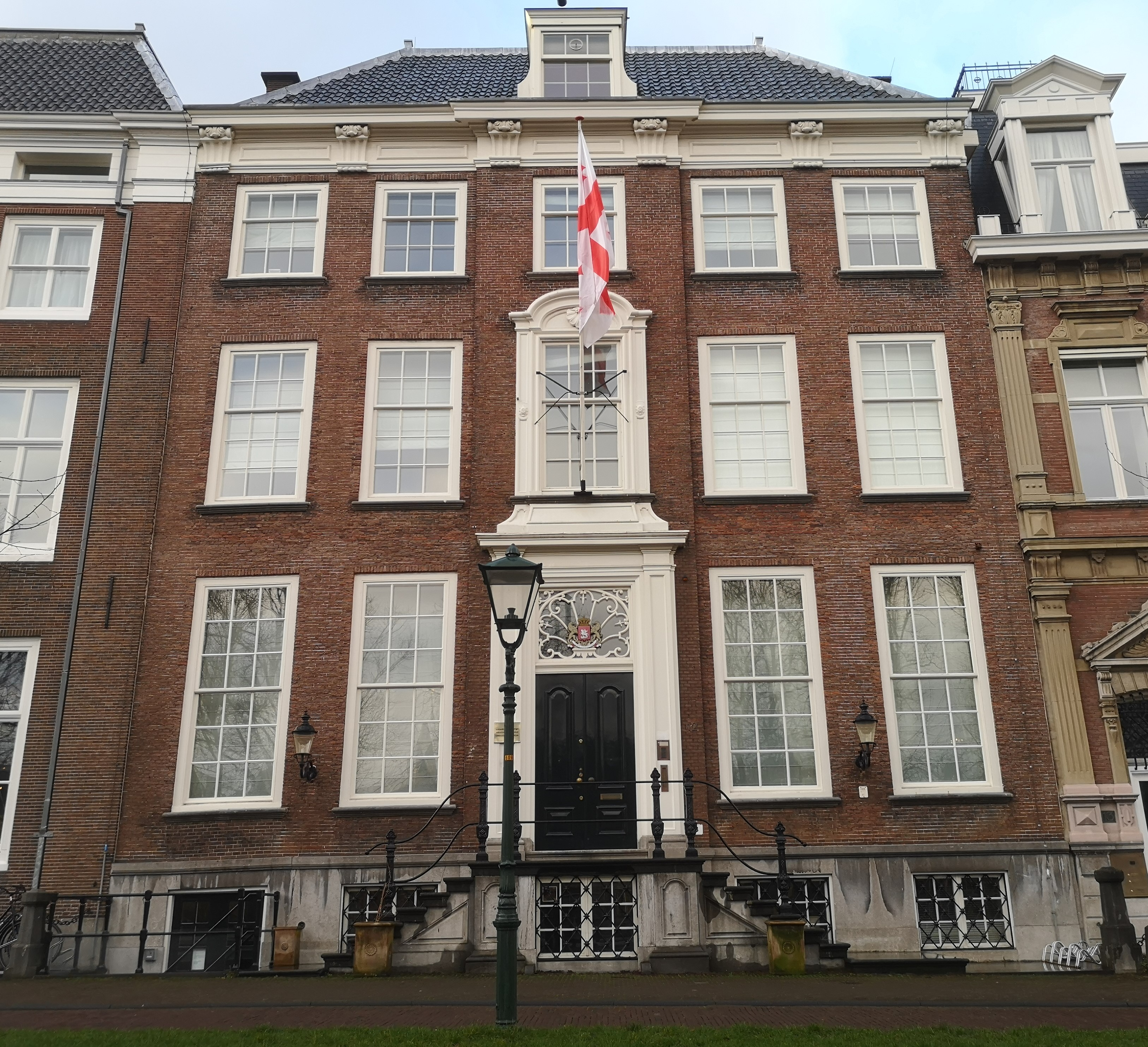
Embassy of Georgia in The Hague

== See also ==
- Embassy of Georgia, The Hague
- Foreign relations of Georgia
- Foreign relations of the Netherlands
- Georgia-NATO relations
- Georgia-EU relations
  - Accession of Georgia to the EU
