= Maia Panjikidze =

Georgian diplomat and politician

- მაია ფანჯიკიძე
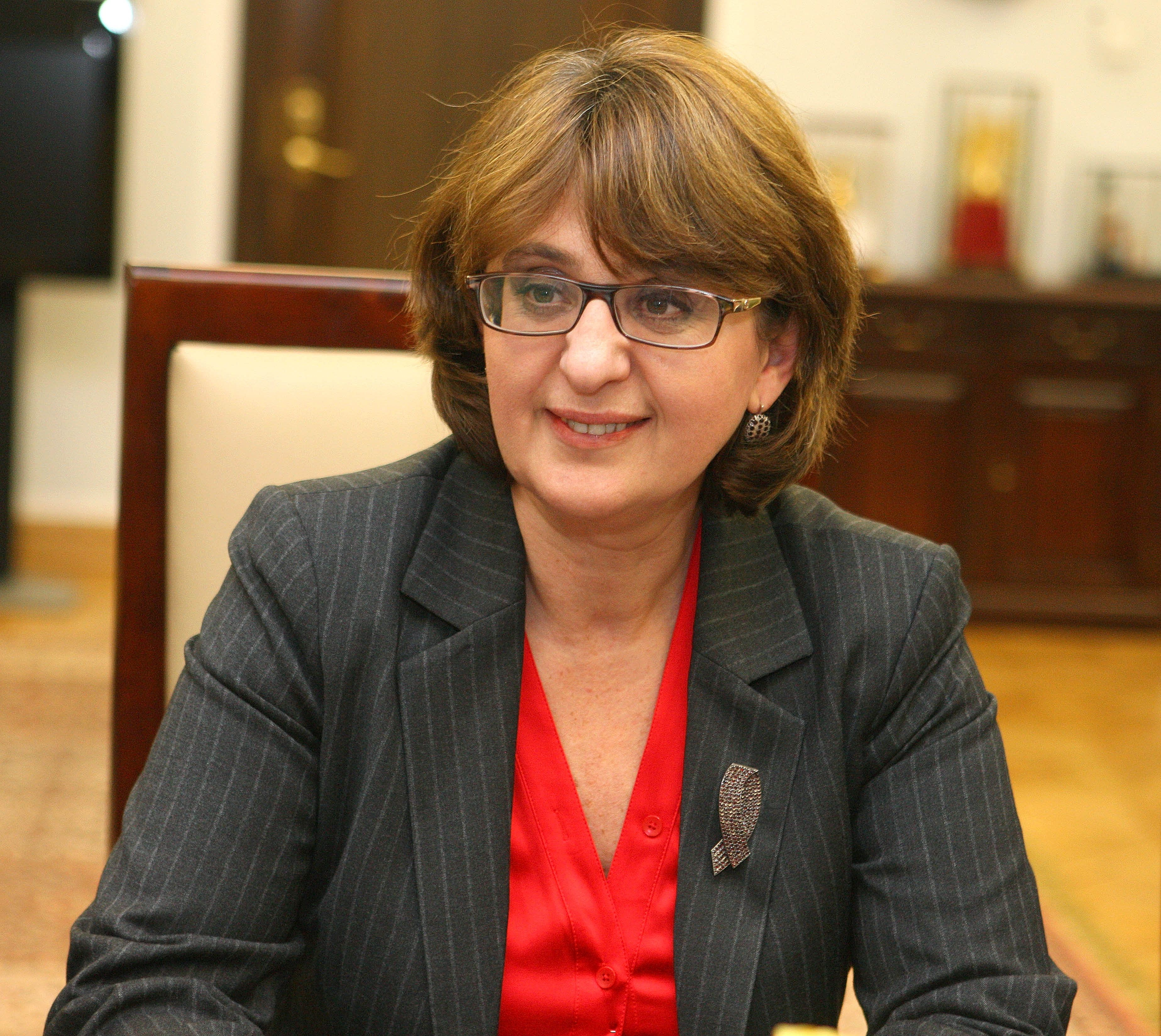
- Panjikidze in 2013

Minister of Foreign Affairs of Georgia
- In office October 25, 2012 – November 5, 2014
- Prime Minister: Bidzina Ivanishvili; Irakli Garibashvili
- Preceded by: Grigol Vashadze
- Succeeded by: Tamar Beruchashvili

Personal details
- Born: 16 October 1960 (age 65) Tbilisi, Georgia SSR, Soviet Union (Now Georgia)
- Party: Free Democrats
- Education: Tbilisi State University; University of Jena
- Website: mfa.gov.ge

Maia Panjikidze (Georgian: მაია ფანჯიკიძე; born October 16, 1960) is a Georgian diplomat and politician. Formerly a teacher of German, she joined the Georgian diplomatic service in 1994 and was appointed as Minister of Foreign Affairs in the cabinet of Bidzina Ivanishvili on October 25, 2012. She resigned November 5, 2014 in protest of Irakli Alasania being relieved of his position as Minister of Defense.

== Early career ==
Born in Tbilisi, Maia Panjikidze is the daughter of the writer Guram Panjikidze. A philologist trained at the universities of Tbilisi and Jena, she taught German in Tbilisi before joining the foreign service in 1994. Most of her career was associated with the Georgian embassy in Berlin. She briefly served as Deputy Foreign Minister in 2004. Later, she became Georgia's ambassador to Germany from 2004 to 2007 and served as an ambassador at the Embassy of Georgia in The Hague, The Kingdom of the Netherlands from 2007 to 2010. After being dismissed from the foreign service in 2010, she claimed that the decision was made for political reasons after her brother-in-law Irakli Alasania quit as Georgia's ambassador to the United Nations and withdrew into opposition to the administration of President Mikheil Saakashvili in 2008.

== Opposition ==
In February 2012, Panjikidze joined the ranks of opposition as a spokesperson for Bidzina Ivanishvili, a multi-billionaire businessman who set up the political party Georgian Dream–Democratic Georgia in order to challenge the incumbent United National Movement in the October 1 parliamentary election. She functioned as the Ivanishvili-led coalition's spokesperson and head of its central office throughout the uneasy election campaign.

== Minister of Foreign Affairs ==
Georgian and US foreign ministers.

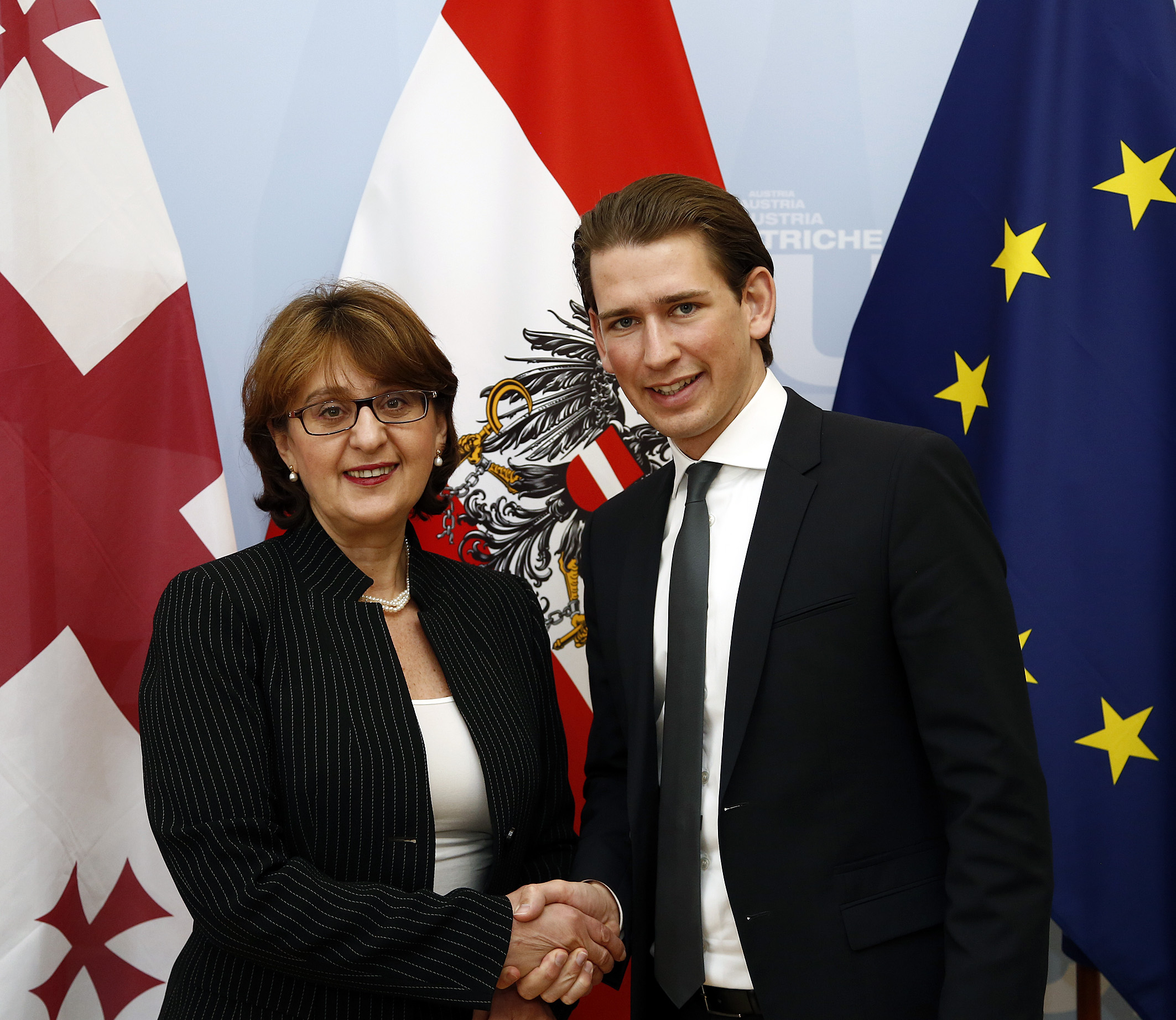
Panjikidze with Austrian Foreign Minister Sebastian Kurz in 2014

After the Georgian Dream's victory in the 2012 parliamentary election, Panjikidze was appointed as Foreign Minister in the cabinet of now-Prime Minister Ivanishvili on October 25, 2012. In her first comments as a minister, she said Georgia's foreign policy priorities such as the European and Euro-Atlantic integration, strategic partnership with the United States, and good relations with neighbors would remain unchanged. Panjikidze also added that the new government would try to normalize relations with Russia, but Georgia would not restore diplomatic ties as long as Russia, an occupying country, maintained its embassies in Georgia's breakaway Abkhazia and South Ossetia.
