= Embassy of Georgia, The Hague =

Georgia's diplomatic mission to the Kingdom of the Netherlands

Embassy of Georgia in The Hague
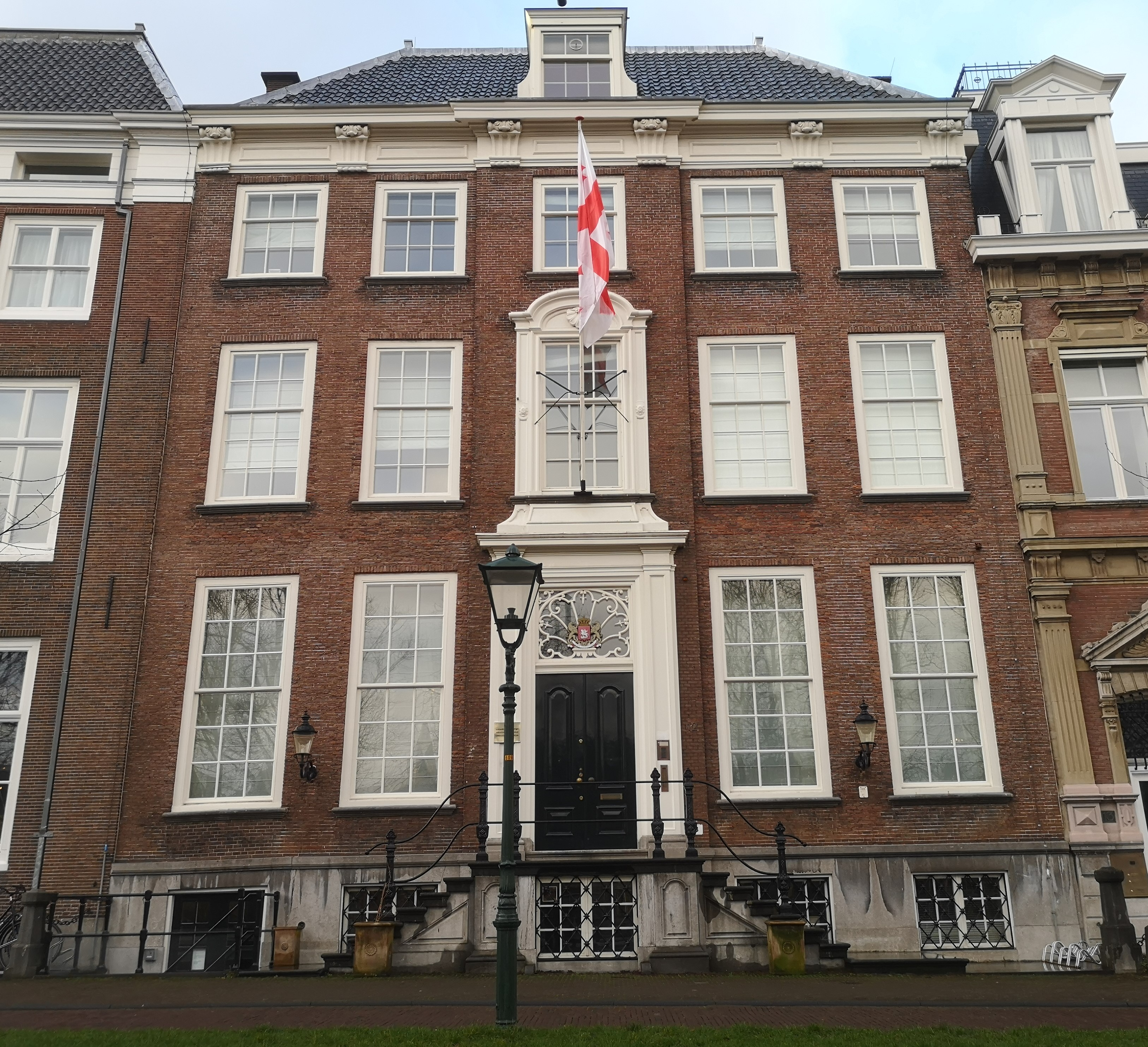
- Location: The Hague, Netherlands
- Address: Lange Vijverberg 12, 2513 AC Den Haag
- Opened: 1992
- Inaugurated: 2007
- Relocated: 2017
- Website: netherlands.mfa.gov.ge

The Embassy of Georgia in The Hague is the diplomatic mission of Georgia to the Kingdom of the Netherlands. It is located at Lange Vijverberg 12 in The Hague. The embassy was established in 2007 after the establishment of diplomatic relations between Georgia and the Netherlands on April 22, 1992 and relocated to its current address in 2017. Prior to the opening of the embassy, Georgia covered diplomatic relations with the Netherlands through its diplomatic mission in Brussels.

The embassy also serves as a Consulate of Georgia in The Hague and serves citizens of Georgia residing throughout the whole of the Netherlands.

== Areas of Cooperation ==
Embassy Sections:

- Consular Affairs;
- Political Affairs;
- Economic Affairs;
- Cultural Affairs; and
- Representation to the International Organizations.

== List of Georgian Ambassadors to the Kingdom of the Netherlands and Important Events ==
=== Georgian Ambassadors to the Kingdom of the Netherlands with residence in Brussels ===
- H.E. Salome Samadashvili (2005–2007)
- H.E. Konstantine Zaldastanishvili (2000–2005)
- H.E. Zurab Abashidze (1998–2000)

=== Georgian Ambassadors to the Kingdom of the Netherlands with Residence in The Hague ===
- H.E. Maia Panjikidze (2007–2010)
- H.E. Shota Gvineria (2010–2014)
- H.E. Konstantine Surguladze (2014–2018)
- H.E. George Sharvashidze (2018–2020)
- H.E. David Solomonia (2021- 2024)

H.E. George Sharvashidze assumed office as the Ambassador of Georgia to the Kingdom of the Netherlands and to the Permanent Representative of Georgia to the Organisation for the Prohibition of Chemical Weapons (OPCW) on December 1, 2018 and 18 days later, presented Letters of Credence to His Majesty King Willem-Alexander on December 19, 2018.

On March 29, 2019, during the visit of H.E. Ms Thea Tsulukiani, Minister of Justice of Georgia, Georgia signed a cooperation agreement in criminal matters with Eurojust. The final document was signed in The Hague by Minister Tsulukiani, Chief Prosecutor Shalva Tadumadze and the head of Eurojust Ladislav Hamran. other high-ranking Georgian officials were present during the ceremony.

During the COVID-19 pandemic of 2020, the Embassy of Georgia assisted 115 Georgian citizens with basic needs, shelter or health needs in the Netherlands and facilitated the organization of direct flights from Amsterdam to Tbilisi.

For the celebration of the restoration of Georgian Independence on May 26, 2020, the embassy organized the playing of the Georgian national anthem and other Georgian melodies from the Grote or Sint-Jacobskerk (The Hague), Scheveningen's Oude Kerk, Voorschoten's Dorpskerk, Alphen aan den Rijn's Adventskerk, Groningen's Martinitoren, and Eindhoven's Catharinakerk.

After more than a year without ambassador to the Netherlands, Georgia appointed David Solomonia on 25 September 2021, as Ambassador Extraordinary and Plenipotentiary to the Kingdom of the Netherlands. Solomonia is seasoned career diplomat, serving Georgian diplomacy since 1995. Prior to the Netherlands he was Ambassador of Georgia to the Federal Republic of Brazil and Non-Resident Ambassador to the Co-operative Republic of Guyana, the Republic of Colombia, the Republic of Peru, Suriname, the Republic of Trinidad and Tobago and the Caribbean Community (CARICOM) since 2017. In November 2024, H.E. Solomonia resigned from his post, shortly after Irakli Kobakhidze announced suspension of EU integration and start of 2024–2025 Georgian protests. In his resignation letter, H.E. Solononia stated:

The greater part of my three decades in the Georgian diplomatic service was dedicated to working on European integration issues. It is a great happiness when your professional obligations coincide with your life choices. I faithfully performed my official duties until I believed that I could at least have an impact on the processes. Today, this hope is over. I condemn any violence and resign from the position of Ambassador Extraordinary and Plenipotentiary of Georgia to the Kingdom of the Netherlands.

== Consulate General of Georgia ==
- Consulate General of Georgia in The Hague: Lange Vijverberg 12, 2513 AC Den Haag
- Honorary Consul of Georgia in Amsterdam: Stadhouderskade 55, 1072 AB Amsterdam
- Honorary Consul of Georgia in South Holland: c/o Acomo, WTC, Beursplein 37, P.O. Box 30156, 3001 DD Rotterdam

== See also ==
- Georgia–Netherlands relations
