= Georgia–Ukraine relations =

- Georgia: Ukraine

Since their independence from the Soviet Union, Georgia and Ukraine have forged close political and cultural relations. The diplomatic relations between the two nations are realized at the level of embassies and consulates. Due to the prosecution in Georgia of Georgian/Ukrainian politician Mikheil Saakashvili and the Russian invasion of Ukraine, relations between the two countries have soured significantly.

== Early contacts ==
In the 10th–12th centuries, the three largest Orthodox states, the Byzantine Empire, Kievan Rus', and the Kingdom of Georgia, maintained active political and diplomatic relations. According to the Rus' chronicles, in 1118 Georgian ambassadors visited Prince Vladimir II Monomakh of Kiev.

In the 17th century, Georgian kingdoms and principalities maintained diplomatic relations with the Zaporozhian Cossacks. The 17th-century Ottoman chronicler Evliya Çelebi wrote that there were many suitable places along the Georgian coastline that the Cossacks used as harbors, and that local Christians assisted them.

The Catholic missionary Pietro della Valle, who lived in Georgia, reported to Pope Urban VIII on the relationship between the Principality of Guria and the Cossacks. According to his account, the Cossacks caused significant difficulties for the Ottomans in the Black Sea region, and the Prince of Guria provided them with ports from which to fight against the Ottomans. Della Valle also wrote that "the Georgians receive them as friends and fellow Christians and intermarry with them."

In the 18th century, Georgian–Ukrainian relations entered a new cultural stage. The life and creative work of the famous Georgian poet and distinguished officer Davit Guramishvili were closely connected with Ukraine. In 1760, the poet settled in Myrhorod, where he lived until the end of his life. Although Guramishvili’s literary activity began in Georgia, his poetic talent fully flourished in Ukraine. Guramishvili's literary work was started in Georgia, but his poetic talent become fully apparent exactly in Ukraine. Autobiographical collected poems Davitiani (1787), the poet's most distinguished work, were created in Ukraine. His other poem "Joyous Spring" was full of sympathy towards peasants and had vivid Ukrainian coloring. The other noted emigrant, Prince Nikolay Tsertelev (Tsereteli, 1790–1869). Although Georgian by origin and Russian by education, he grew up in Ukraine and developed a deep attachments to its people, being one of the earliest enthusiasts of Ukrainian folklore and a staunch local patriot.

The famous Ukrainian poet Lesya Ukrainka settled in Georgia in 1913 with her husband Klyment Kvitka. She died soon afterwards in Tbilisi. The poems of Ukrainka and Taras Shevchenko were translated into Georgian in 1922 (most of the poems of Shevchenko were taught in the Georgian schools before and during the Soviet period). Ukrainians and Georgians soon found themselves in the same political reality. Both countries opposed Russian domination and resisted Russification attempts by the Tsarist and later Soviet Russia.

== Post-Revolution and Soviet era ==
After the Russian Revolution of 1917, both Georgia and Ukraine declared independence as the Democratic Republic of Georgia and the Ukrainian People's Republic respectively. The two republics accorded each other de jure recognition and established diplomatic ties. Victor Tevzaia was Georgia's first ambassador to Ukraine. Both nations were suppressed by the Soviets in 1921 and absorbed into the Soviet Union in 1922. Since 1936, Georgia and Ukraine were officially known as the Georgian Soviet Socialist Republic and the Ukrainian Soviet Socialist Republic.

In 1942, head of OUN Stepan Bandera appealed to the Georgian nation to join his fight against the Soviet authorities and for national liberation. Many Georgians who left their country during the 1921 Red Army invasion of Georgia have settled in Poland. Many of them who had military education crossed into Ukraine and joined the Ukrainian Insurgent Army (Українська Повстанська Армія) against the Soviet regime. In 1943 UPA general Roman Shukhevych created the Georgian battalion of UPA (Грузинська дивізія УПА) which lasted until 1945.

In the last year of the existence of the Soviet Union, Ukraine participated in the union-wide referendum to preserve the Soviet Union in a different form made by Mikhail Gorbachev, while Georgia (aside from Abkhazia) did not. The next month, on 9 April, Georgia declared independence from the Soviet Union while Ukraine, the second largest republic behind the Russian SFSR, did so on 24 August after the failed coup in Moscow two days earlier. Eventually, Ukraine held a referendum that took place on December 1 leaves with a 90% favor of independence. The secession ended the chances of the Union staying together, especially on a limited scale. The independence of both countries were recognized by the United States on 25 December 1991.

Flag of the Georgian SSR

Flag of the Ukrainian SSR

== Post-independence ==
=== War in Abkhazia ===
In 1992, during the War in Abkhazia, the Ukrainian National Assembly called for volunteers to join their newly created military formation UNSO-Argo with intent to aid Georgian side against the Russian-backed Abkhaz separatists during the conflict. UNSO-Argo (named after Argonauts) with its 150 fighters were deployed to Abkhazia and stationed in Gulripshi, Shroma, Tamishi and Sukhumi. During the full-scale offensive by the Russian and Abkhaz sides in August 1993 on Shroma, Ukrainians managed to repel the attack but lost seven members of their battalion. However, on 15 September 1993, the Ukrainian battalion retreated from Shroma after being outnumbered by the Kuban Cossack formations. Some of the fighters of UNSO-Argo received Georgian medals of Vakhtang Gorgasal's Order, I class. Ukraine also gave humanitarian assistance in evacuating Georgian refugees in 1993.

In January 1996, Ukraine signed a CIS treaty imposing economic sanctions on Abkhazia.

=== 1990s and early-mid 2000s ===
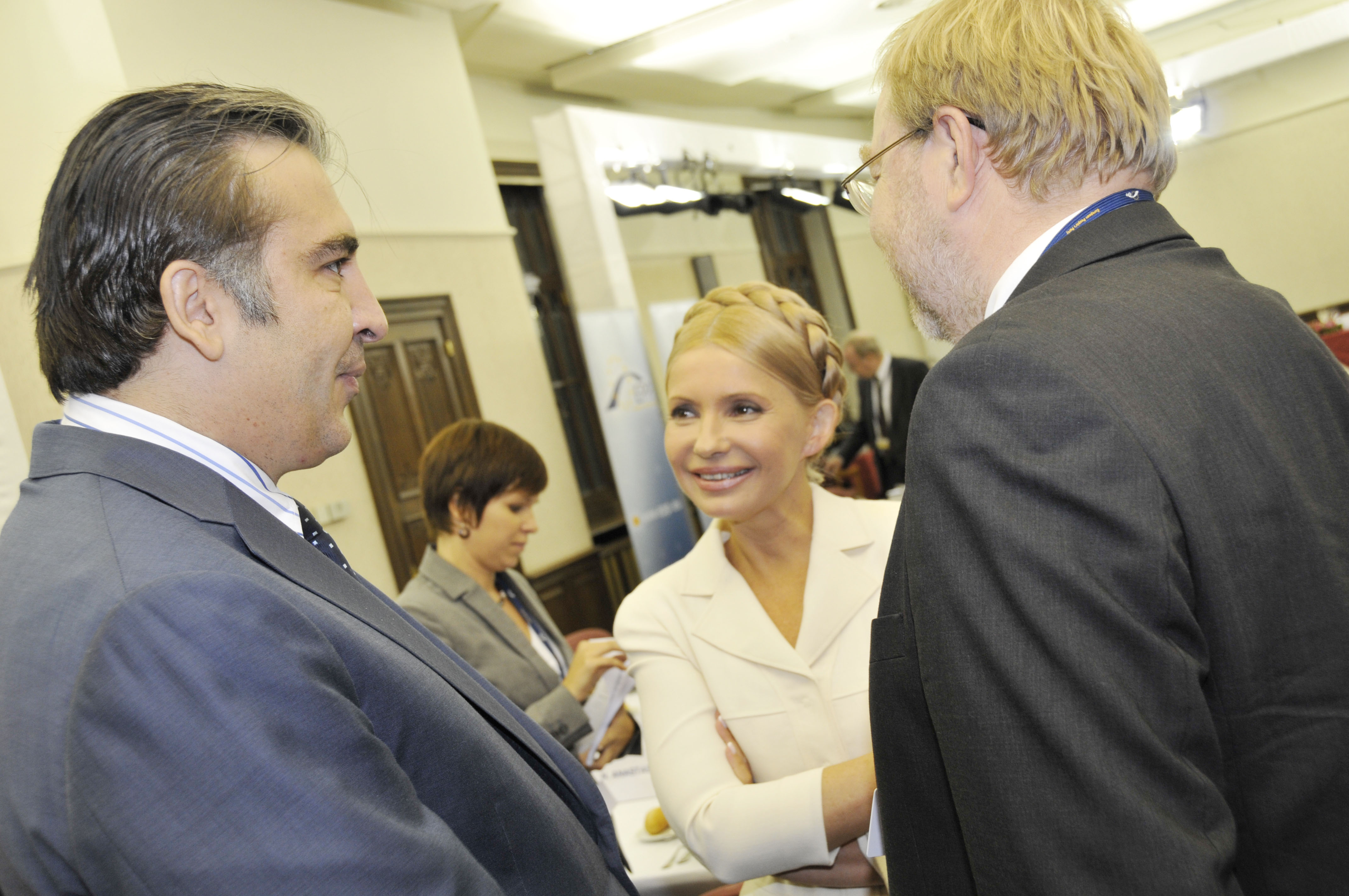
(Ukrainian politician) Yulia Tymoshenko and President Saakashvili during a September 2010 EPP Summit

During the Shevardnadze era, the Georgian government maintained its close relations with Ukraine. However, the relationship has further enhanced after Rose Revolution in Georgia and Orange Revolution in Ukraine. During the Orange Revolution, many Georgians rallied in Kyiv in support of Viktor Yushchenko. Both countries maintain pro-western political orientation and aspire to join NATO and the European Union. The close friendship between Presidents Mikheil Saakashvili and Viktor Yushchenko has also played an important role in recent political unity of the two countries.

=== War in Eastern Ukraine and Annexation of Crimea ===
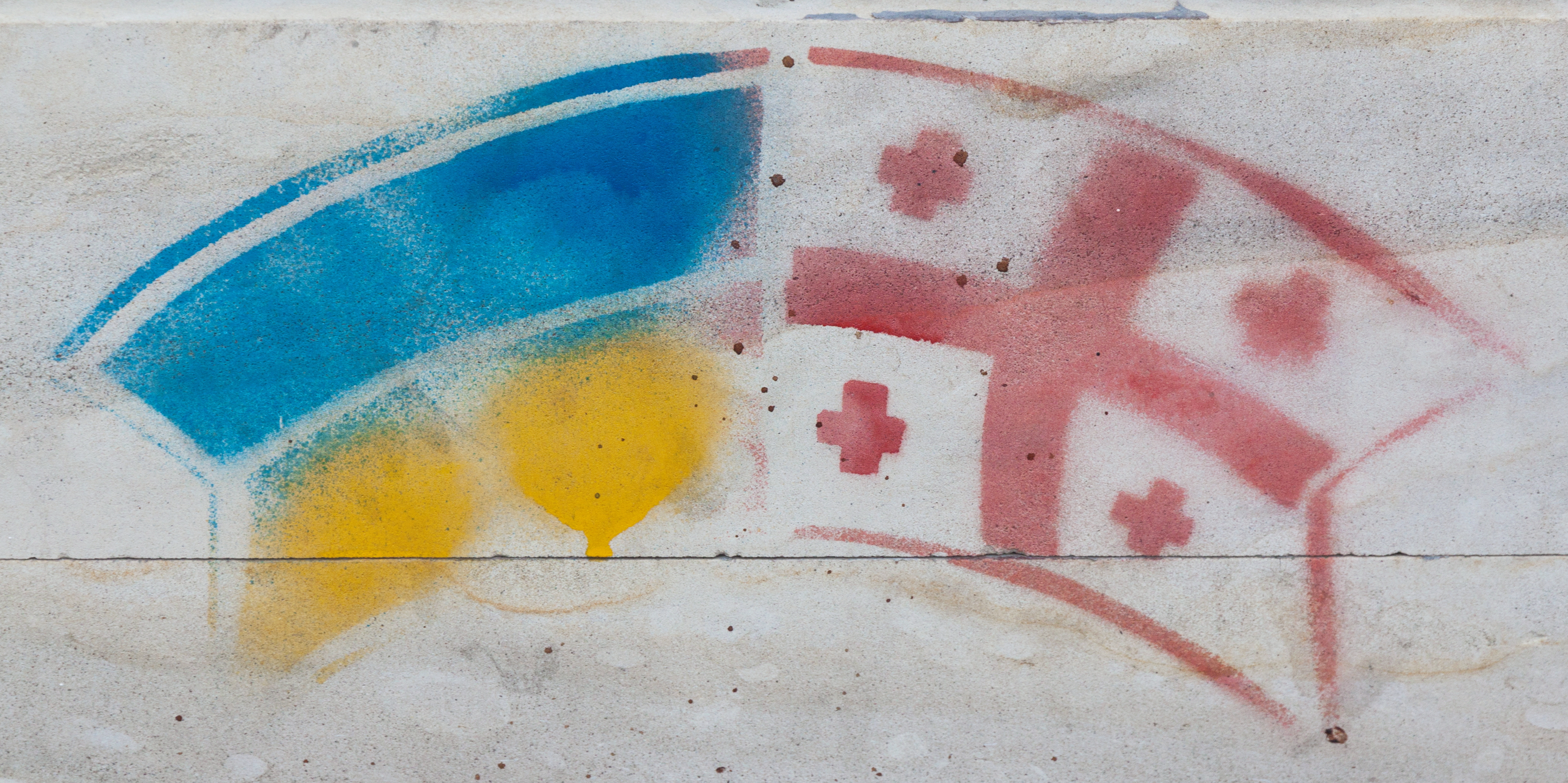
Street art of the Ukrainian and Georgian flags in 2014

In 2014, Georgia condemned the Russian annexation of Crimea, voicing support for Ukraine. Georgia imposed a ban on trade and financial transactions with Crimea. This measure mirrored Ukraine's restrictions on such dealings with Georgia's breakaway regions, Abkhazia and South Ossetia, and was meant to signal Georgia's support for the territorial integrity of Ukraine.

Additionally, the Georgian Legion was formed by Georgian volunteers to take part in the war in Donbas on the side of Ukraine. The unit was organized in 2014, and in 2016 it was transferred under the control of the Ukrainian Army, under the 25th Mechanized Infantry Battalion "Kyiv Rus". The group is commanded by Mamuka Mamulashvili, a veteran Georgian officer.

=== Deterioration of relations since 2015 ===
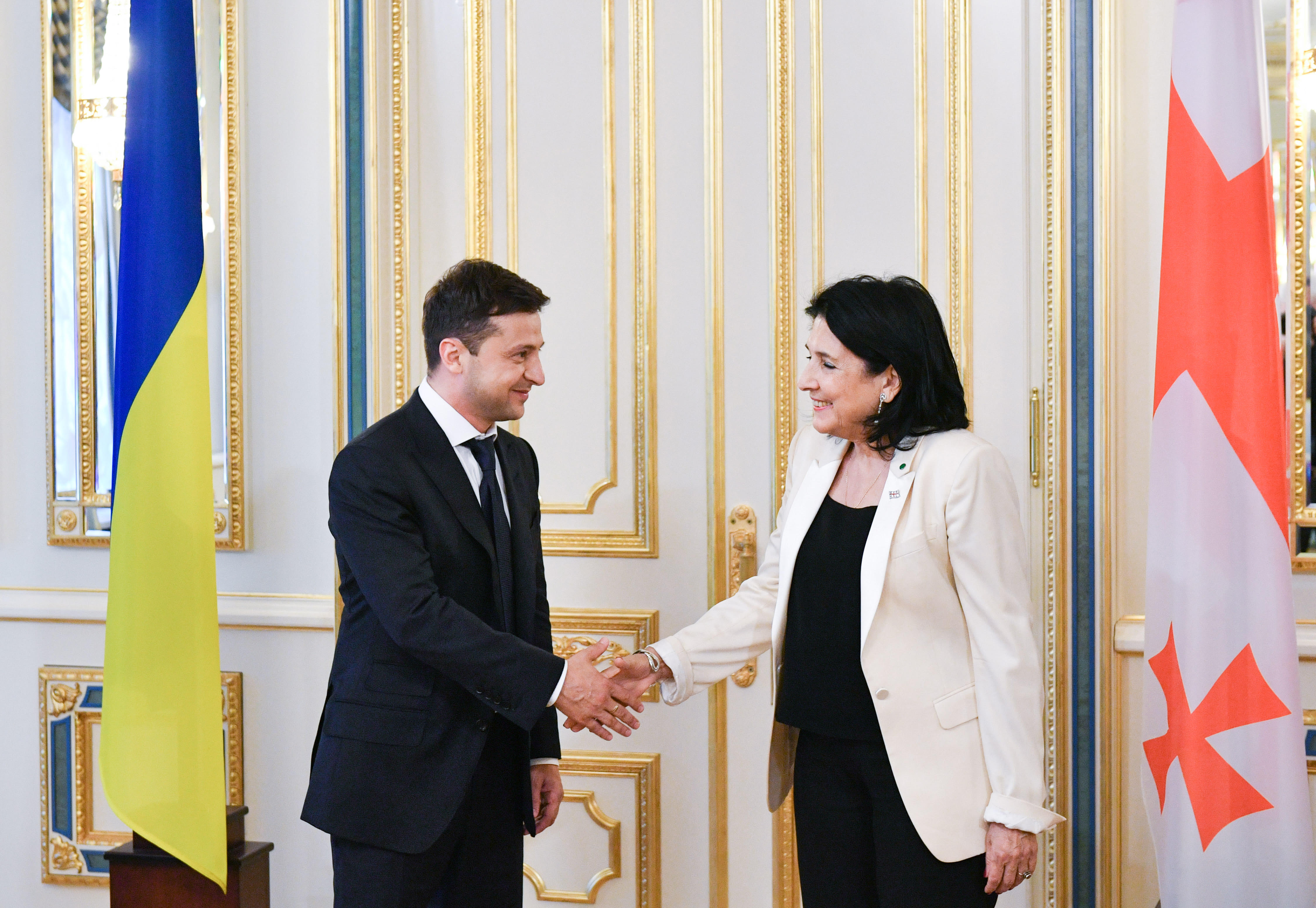
President of Georgia Salome Zurabishvili with President of Ukraine Volodymyr Zelenskyy at the Mariinskyi Palace in Kyiv on 20 May 2019.

Former Georgian president Mikheil Saakashvili left Georgia after his second term expired in 2013 and soon moved to Ukraine. The new Georgian government brought criminal charges against him, and he was sentenced in absentia to 6 years in prison by the Tbilisi City Court. Ukraine has rejected Tbilisi's request for extradition. In 2015, Ukrainian president Petro Poroshenko appointed Saakashvili as governor of Odesa Oblast, Ukraine's largest province. After his appointment relations between the two countries soured, and for several years Ukraine did not have an Ambassador to Georgia. Additionally to Saakashvili, Ukraine has also appointed other former Georgian officials from the Saakashvili government at top public posts in Ukraine and has refused to extradite them despite criminal cases against them in Georgia: Zurab Adeishvili as an adviser to Ukraine's Prosecutor General, Gia Lortkipanidze as a Deputy Head of Ukraine's counterintelligence, David Sakvarelidze as a Deputy General Prosecutor of Ukraine, Khatia Dekanoidze as a Chief of the National Police of Ukraine and others.

Following Saakashvili's resignation from the post of Odesa governor in November 2016, bilateral relations between the two countries began improving. In March 2017, Ukraine, which was at the time a temporary member of the United Nations Security Council, proposed a resolution supporting the territorial integrity of Georgia. However, Russia used its power as a permanent member of the council to veto any further discussion on the matter. Georgia and Ukraine, along with Azerbaijan and Moldova, also vowed to renew their economic ties through GUAM, an economic organization consisting of the four countries.

Georgia and Ukraine have maintained some military ties as well. In 2018, Georgia and Ukraine each participated in Operation Noble Partner 18, and Georgian soldiers and Ukrainian marines conducted urban operations exercises together.

Relations between Ukraine and Georgia again began to deteriorate in 2020 after Ukrainian president Volodymyr Zelenskyy appointed Saakashvili as a head of the executive committee of the National Reform Council of Ukraine. In June 2020, Georgia decided to recall its ambassador to Kyiv.

The relations further deteriorated in October 2021, after Mikheil Saakashvili secretly returned to Georgia via a semi-trailer truck loaded with milk products, bypassing the customs control. By this time Saakashvili had already been condemned by the Tbilisi City Court to six years in prison in absentia for abuse of power, embezzlement, and his implication in the attempted murder of an opposition lawmaker. Saakashvili's return to Georgia became known to the public after he published a video that, according to his description, had been taken in Batumi. He called on his followers from all over the country to march on the capital, Tbilisi, saying that he would join the convoy. The ruling party, "Georgian Dream" called the video "deepfake" and stated that Saakashvili was in Ukraine and had not left the territory of Ukraine. Mamuka Mdinaradze, a leader of the ruling party of Georgia, said that the Georgian government had "specific information" that Saakashvili did not leave the territory of Ukraine at all. However, later it was confirmed that Saakashvili was actually in Georgia, and he was arrested by the police. This situation led to further straining of Georgia–Ukraine relations. The investigation found out that Saakashvili entered Georgia secretly, hiding in a semi-trailer truck loaded with milk products, bypassing the customs control. Georgian officials later raised questions about Ukrainian government involvement in Saakashvili's return. In response to the arrest of Mikheil Saakashvili, Ukraine's President Volodymyr Zelenskyy announced that he would use "various means" to return Saakashvili back to the country. This was criticized by Georgian officials, who said that Saakashvili would leave Georgia only after serving his time in prison.

==== Russian invasion of Ukraine ====
The 2022 Russian invasion of Ukraine caused even more discord between Georgia and Ukraine. This was related to claims that Ukraine was pressuring Georgia to open a "second front" against Russia. Particularly, the Secretary of the National Security Council of Ukraine Oleksiy Danilov, Zelenskyy's advisor Oleksiy Arestovych and the Ukrainian Verkhovna Rada (parliament) deputy Oleksiy Goncharenko suggested that Georgia should "open a second front" against Russia to retake Abkhazia and South Ossetia. Georgian officials accused Ukraine of pursuing its own interests at the expense of Georgia, saying that "opening a second front" would alleviate Ukraine's situation, but bring suffering and destruction to Georgia as Russia's army is considerably stronger and well-equipped compared to Georgia's. The chairman of Georgia's ruling party Irakli Kobakhidze said that Georgia had the military means to "make the situation worse for Russia", but doing so would "come at the cost of destroying Georgia". Georgia's Prime Minister Irakli Garibashvili alleged that Ukraine was seeking to drag Georgia into the war against Russia. Garibashvili condemned Oleksiy Arestovych for saying: "the leadership of Moldova and Georgia are not people of war; Saakashvili could have done it, but not the current leadership of Georgia". Georgia's Prime Minister said that Ukraine sent ex-President Mikhail Saakashvili from Ukraine to "open second front" in Georgia against Russia. However, Saakashvili was arrested and the Ukrainian Government asked Tbilisi to release Saakashvili to Kyiv. Georgian Prime Minister claimed at a speech in parliament that the Ukrainian Government and the Georgian opposition (former Georgian government led by Mikheil Saakashvili) are close ideological partners.

Another point of contention between Georgia and Ukraine was Georgia's position regarding international sanctions against Russia. During the invasion, Georgia announced support for Ukraine and condemned Russia's actions, adopting a supportive resolution for Ukraine and voting in favor of Ukraine at the diplomatic forums. However, Georgia did not join economic sanctions imposed on Russia by Western countries. Georgia's prime minister Irakli Garibashvili said that Georgia could not afford to impose sanctions on Russia because it would hurt the Georgian economy more than it would hurt Russia. Moreover, Georgia feared a possible escalation of tensions with Russia, citing absence of any security guarantees in the event of a confrontation. Garibashvili also recalled the Russia-Georgia war in 2008 and stressed that no sanctions had been imposed by the Western countries on Russia following its invasion. This left Ukrainian officials dissatisfied with Georgia's position. Kyiv responded by recalling its ambassador from Georgia for consultation. Georgia was the only country from which the Ukrainian ambassador was recalled during the Russian invasion of Ukraine.

Ukrainian intelligence officials released a statement accusing Georgia of helping Russia to evade international sanctions. Tbilisi responded by calling accusations "misinformation" and "totally unacceptable", asking Kyiv to provide evidence or apologize. Ukraine's foreign minister Dmytro Kuleba stated that Kyiv was still awaiting confirmation from Georgia that it supported Ukraine and not Russia. The Georgian Government denied any claims of helping Russia to evade sanctions, highlighting that Georgia "strictly observed" all international sanctions imposed on Russia and did everything it could to support Ukraine politically and diplomatically. Nikoloz Samkharadze, Chair of Foreign Relations Committee of Georgian Parliament, stated in an interview with Vice that "Georgia is the most exposed country in the world to the Russian aggression. The Russian troops are stationed 30 kilometers away from where we are sitting right now, from the heart of the Tbilisi. So, in this circumstances, I think Georgia is punching above its weight when it supports Ukraine at diplomatic forum, politically and also in humanitarian dimension".

Georgian authorities claimed that the Ukrainian government falsely accused Georgia of helping Russia to evade sanctions in order to drag Georgia into the war against Russia. Vice Prime Minister of Georgia Tea Tsulukiani accused the Ukrainian Government of repeating the narratives of the party of Mikheil Saakashvili about Russia evading international sanctions through Georgia.

On 26 June 2022, Ukrainian president Zelenskyy signed a decree dismissing Ukraine's ambassador to Georgia, Ihor Dolhov.

On 1 July 2023, Ukraine sanctioned Georgian Airways for it resuming flights to Russia after Russian president Vladimir Putin lifted a ban on airline flights with Georgia.

On 3 July 2023, President Zelenskyy ordered the expulsion of the Georgian ambassador from Kyiv, this was done after Zelenskyy accused the Georgian government of "killing Saakashvili in prison". According to Zelenskyy, Ukraine had "repeatedly called on official Tbilisi to stop this mockery and agree on the return of Saakashvili to Ukraine."

On 20 July 2023, Georgian prime minister Irakli Garibashvili said that Ukraine was working to sabotage Georgia's efforts to join the European Union, saying that Ukraine was pressuring the European Union not to grant Georgia candidate status for membership of the EU.

On 18 September 2023, the State Security Service of Georgia (SSSG) published a statement, saying that some Ukrainian officials were conspiring with the Georgian opposition to overthrow the second Garibashvili government in an allegedly planned "Euro Maidan scenario". This coup was allegedly planned for the period after a possible European Union rejection of Georgia's membership candidate status at the end of 2023. The SSSG stated that the conspirators provided training to overthrow the Georgian government near the Poland–Ukraine border, with the support of the organization Canvas/Otpor. Speaker of the Georgian Parliament Shalva Papuashvili claimed that Ukraine had become a "shelter" for Georgian "criminals" (members of the former Georgian government led by Mikheil Saakashvili) in top public posts and that these functionaries had been involved the planned coup.

== Cultural relations ==
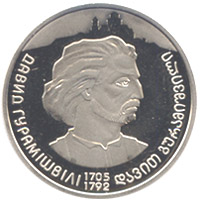
A 2005 Ukrainian hryvnia coin commemorating Davit Guramishvili

There are many cultural events in both countries, celebrating close relations between Georgian and Ukrainian people. In 2007, Georgians unveiled a statue to Taras Shevchenko in Tbilisi while Ukrainians erected the statue of Georgia's epic poet Shota Rustaveli in Kyiv.

== Resident diplomatic missions ==
- Georgia has an embassy in Kyiv and consulate-general in Odesa.
- Ukraine has an embassy in Tbilisi.
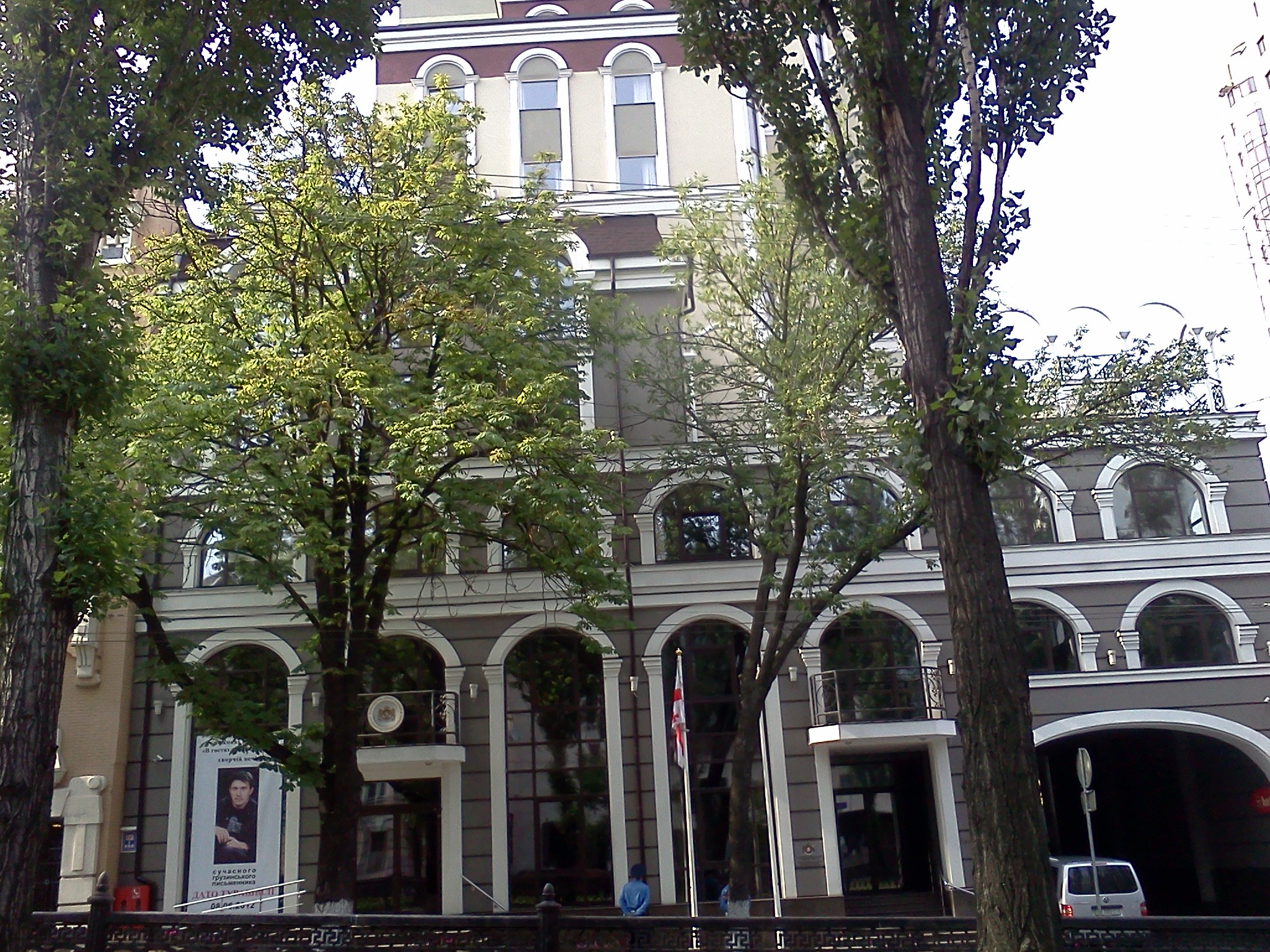
Embassy of Georgia in Kyiv

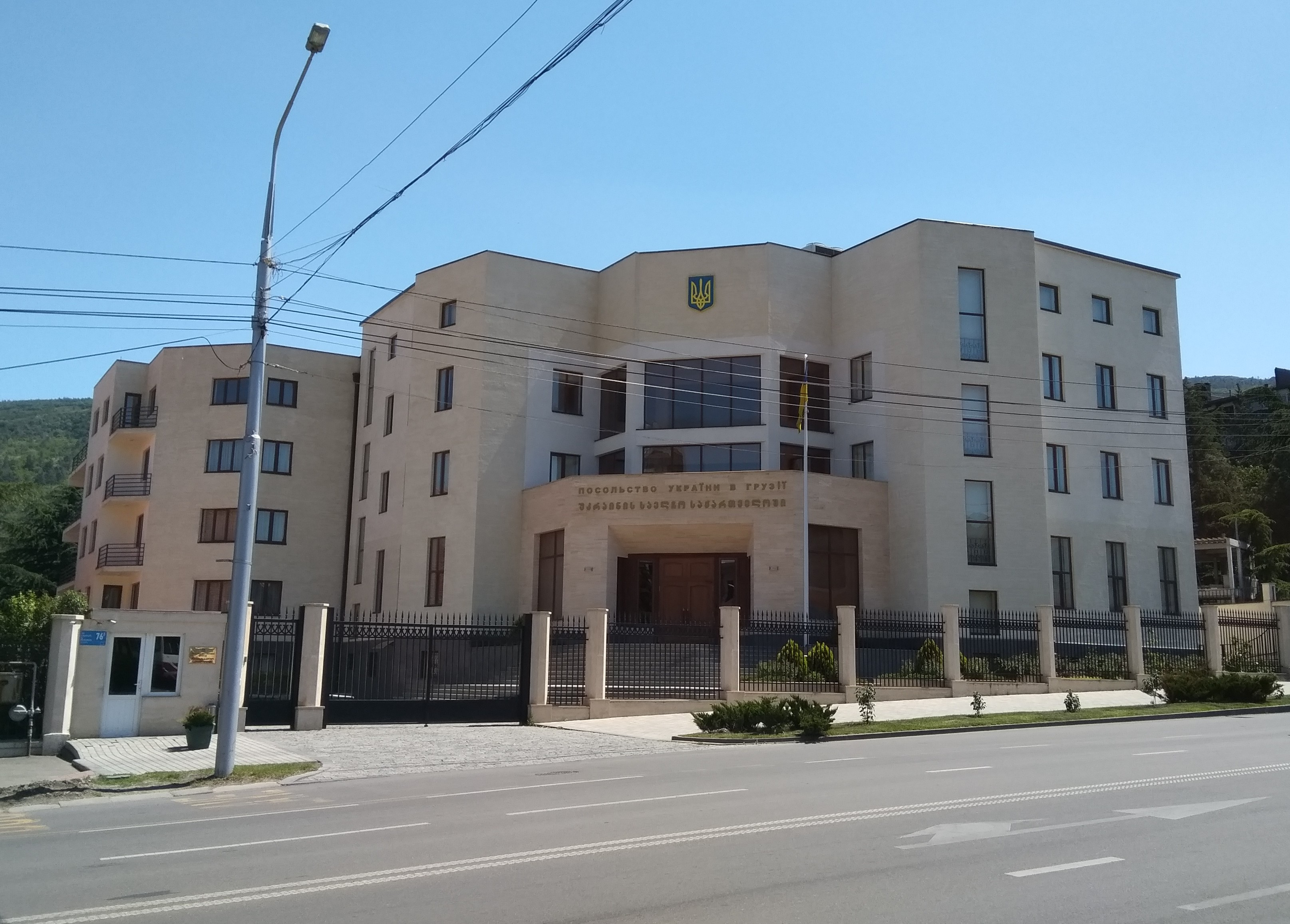
Embassy of Ukraine in Tbilisi

== See also ==
- Foreign relations of Georgia
- Foreign relations of Ukraine
- GUAM Organization for Democracy and Economic Development
- Community of Democratic Choice
- Black Sea Forum for Partnership and Dialogue
- Georgians in Ukraine
- Ukrainians in Georgia
- Georgia–Russia relations
- Georgia–European Union relations
  - Accession of Georgia to the European Union
- Ukraine–European Union relations
  - Accession of Ukraine to the European Union
- Georgia–NATO relations
- Ukraine–NATO relations
