= Georgians in Ukraine =

Georgian Ukrainians
Total population
- 34,199 (2001 census)

Regions with significant populations
- Donetsk Oblast, Dnipropetrovsk Oblast

Languages
- Georgian, Ukrainian and Russian

Religion
- Eastern Orthodox

Related ethnic groups
- Georgians

Ethnic Georgians in Ukraine number around 34,199.

== History ==
Connections between inhabitants of today's Ukraine and Georgia until the 19th century had a mostly sporadic character. During the Rus' era economic relations existed between the Kingdom of Georgia and Tmutarakan, and in the 12th century dynastic marriages were concluded between prince Iziaslav II of Kiev and the daughter of king Demetrius I of Georgia, as well as between Tamar of Georgia and Yury Bogolyubsky.

First mentions of Georgian settlement in Ukraine date from the 1720s and are connected with migration from territories occupied by the Ottoman Empire and Iran. In 1738 a Georgian hussar regiment was established by Russian empress Anna in the area of Poltava. Starting from 1743, several Georgian noble families settled in the lands of Cossack Hetmanate under the rule of empress Elizabeth of Russia. In 1764 Catherine the Great transferred a number of landholdings in Novorossiya Governorate of modern Southern Ukraine to Georgian aristocrats. Many of their representatives eventually intermarried with members of Cossack starshyna and local nobility.

During the 19th century, close economic ties existed between Ukrainian lands and Georgia, with active trade being established through the port of Odesa. Many Georgians also served in Ukraine as officials, lawyers, doctors, or studied in the local educational establishments, such as the Kyiv Theological Academy. This period also saw increasing cultural contacts between Ukrainians and Georgians. In 1914, Georgian students in Kyiv took part in protests against the government ban on celebrations of the centenary of Taras Shevchenko. In September 1917 Georgian representatives took part in the Congress of the Enslaved Peoples of Russia called up on the initiative of Ukrainian Central Rada. During that period, separate "Georgian druzhinas" were formed in Kyiv and Odesa in order to protect local Georgians. In 1918 diplomatic relations were established between the Ukrainian State and Georgian Democratic Republic, and a Georgian diplomatic mission was opened in Kyiv. Following the capture of the city by the Bolshevik troops in January 1919, the Georgian embassy moved to Odesa.

Under the Soviet rule Georgian population in Ukraine increased almost 18-fold. According to the 2001 Ukrainian census, 34,199 people of Georgian ethnicity resided in Ukraine, most of them in the southeastern regions and Kyiv. Over half of Ukrainian Georgians spoke Russian as their native language. Currently, numerous Georgian civic organizations and cultural centres exist in various Ukrainian cities. Following the start of Russo-Ukrainian War in 2014, a Georgian Legion was established, and in 2016 became an official part of the Armed Forces of Ukraine.

== Notable people ==
- Davit Guramishvili (1705–1792), poet.
- Niko Lomouri (1852–1915), writer.
- Victor Tevzaia (1883–1932), Ambassador of Georgia to Ukraine (1918).
- Ivan Kavaleridze (1887–1978), sculptor and filmmaker.
- Davyd Zhvania (1967–2022), politician.
- Mikheil Saakashvili (born 1968), President of Georgia (2004–2007, 2008–2013), governor of the Odesa Oblast (2015–2016).
- Georgiy Gongadze (1969–2000), journalist.
- Vakhtang Kipiani (born 1971), journalist.
- Mamuka Mamulashvili (born 1978), military commander.
- Davyd Arakhamia (born 1979), politician.

== See also ==
- Georgia–Ukraine relations
- Ukrainians in Georgia
- Georgian diaspora
- Ethnic groups in Ukraine
