= Georgia–Spain relations =

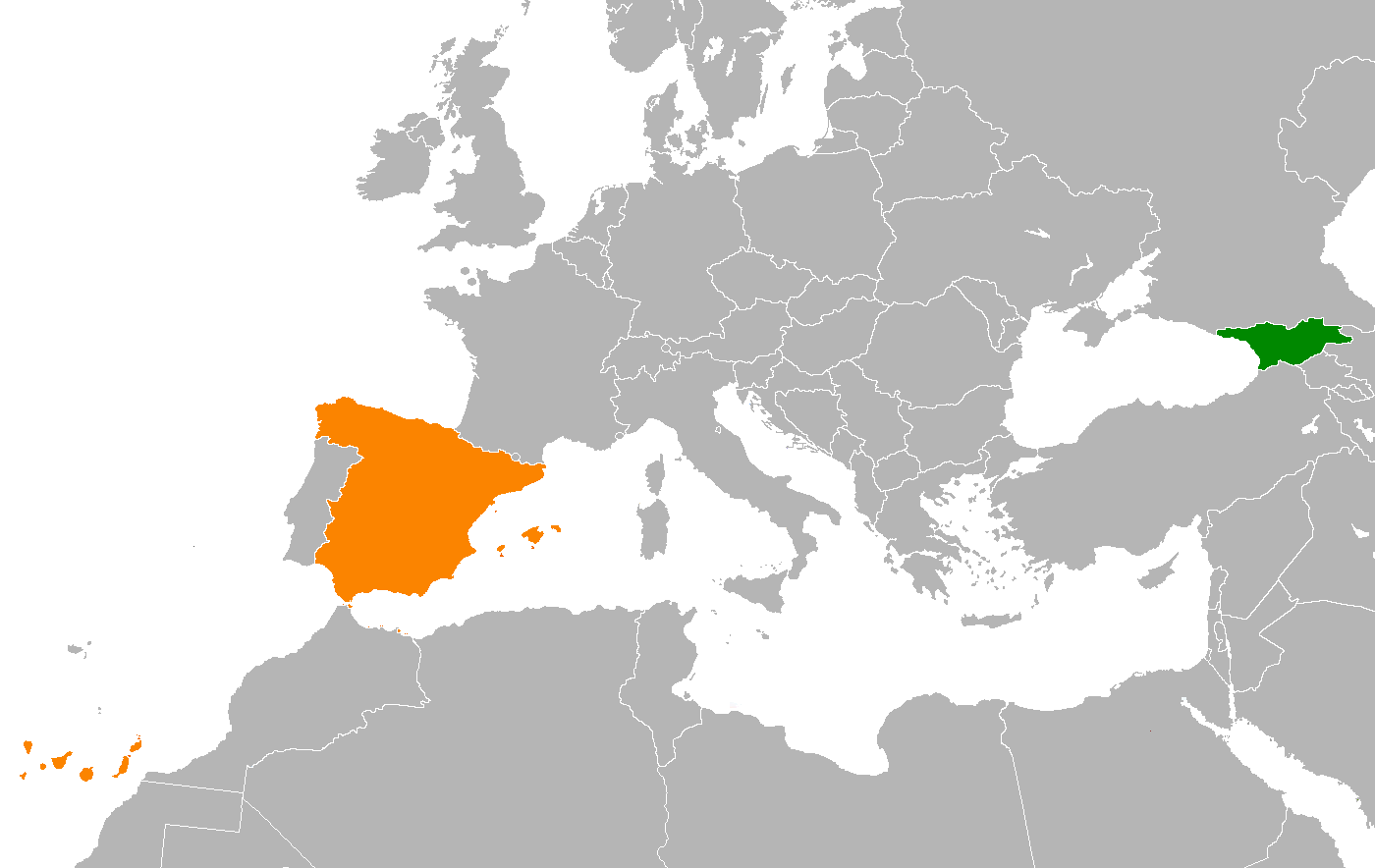
- Georgia: Spain

Georgia–Spain relations are the bilateral and diplomatic relations between these two countries. Georgia has an embassy in Madrid. Spain is accredited to Georgia from its embassy in Ankara, Turkey and maintains an embassy office in Tbilisi. Georgia and Spain (along with Portugal) have shared the historical name "Iberia" in their territories: Iberia (Spain and Portugal) and the Kingdom of Iberia (Georgia). Spain is a member of the European Union, which Georgia applied for in 2022. Both nations are members of the Council of Europe and Organization for Security and Co-operation in Europe.

== Diplomatic relations ==
Spain maintains diplomatic relations with Georgia since 1992. Currently, Spain's relations with Georgia are marked by Spanish membership in the European Union (EU). Georgian Crown Prince David Bagration of Mukhrani was born in Madrid on 24 June 1976 and settled in Tbilisi in 2003.

Georgia has had a diplomatic representation in Madrid since 2005. Both countries have relied on territorial unity respectively and cooperate successfully in different bilateral areas.

== Economic relations ==
In 2014, Spanish exports to Georgia amounted to 58.8 million euros (€78.8 M 2013), which represents a decrease of 25.4%, while imports made by Georgia from Spain have reached 81, 43 million euros (€29.32 million in 2013), which represents the largest increase in recent years with 177.7%.

== Agreements ==
- Agreement on cultural, educational and scientific cooperation, Signature: 11 March 1993, Effective: 12 June 1996, B.O.E.: 3 December 1996.
- Agreement to avoid double taxation and prevent tax evasion in matters of income and property taxes. Protocol, Signature: 7 June 2010, Effective: 1 July 2011, B.O.E.: 1 June 2011

== Resident diplomatic missions ==
- Georgia has an embassy in Madrid and a consulate-general in Barcelona.
- Spain is accredited to Georgia from its embassy in Ankara, Turkey and maintains an embassy office in Tbilisi.

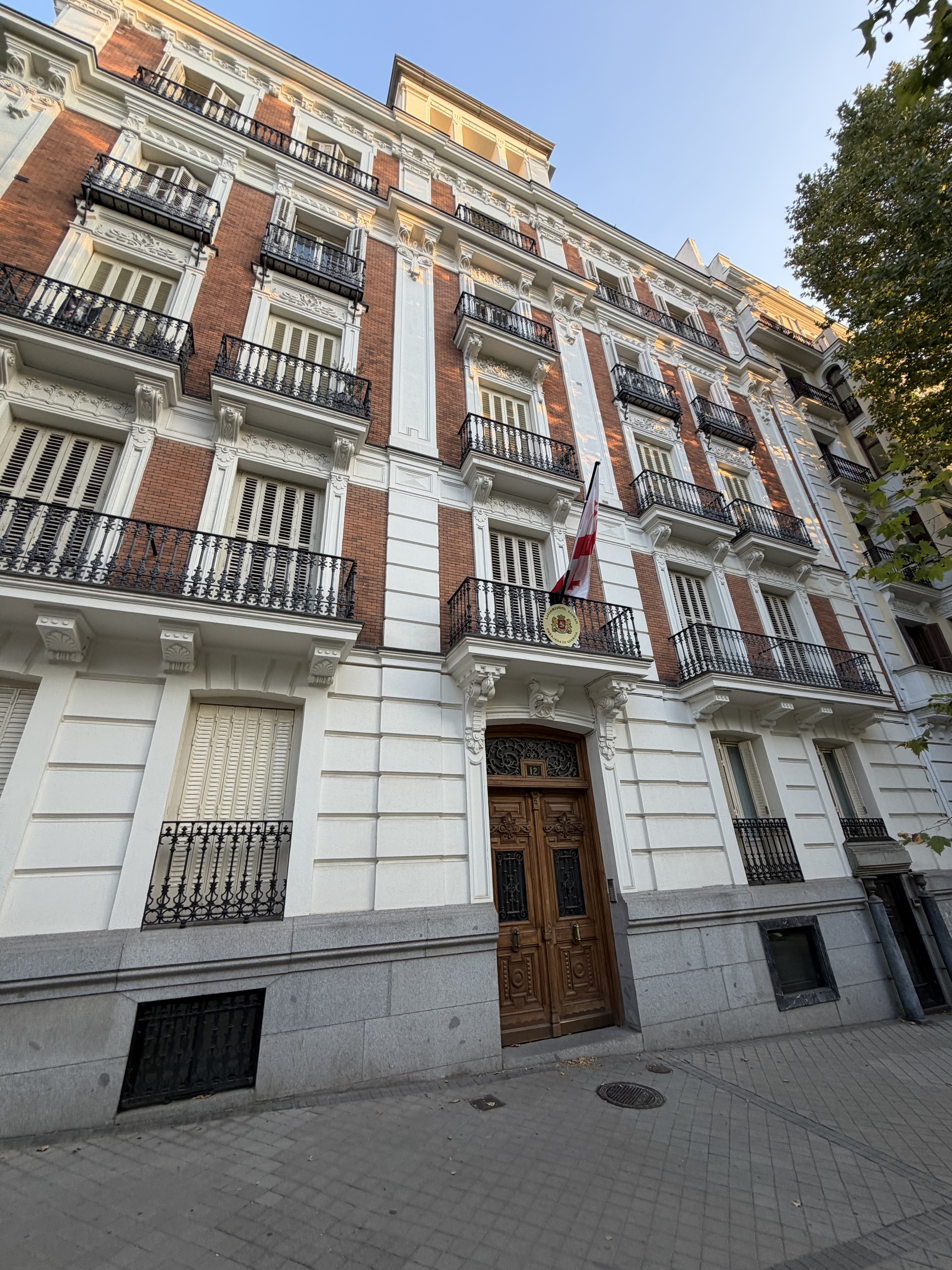
Embassy of Georgia in Madrid

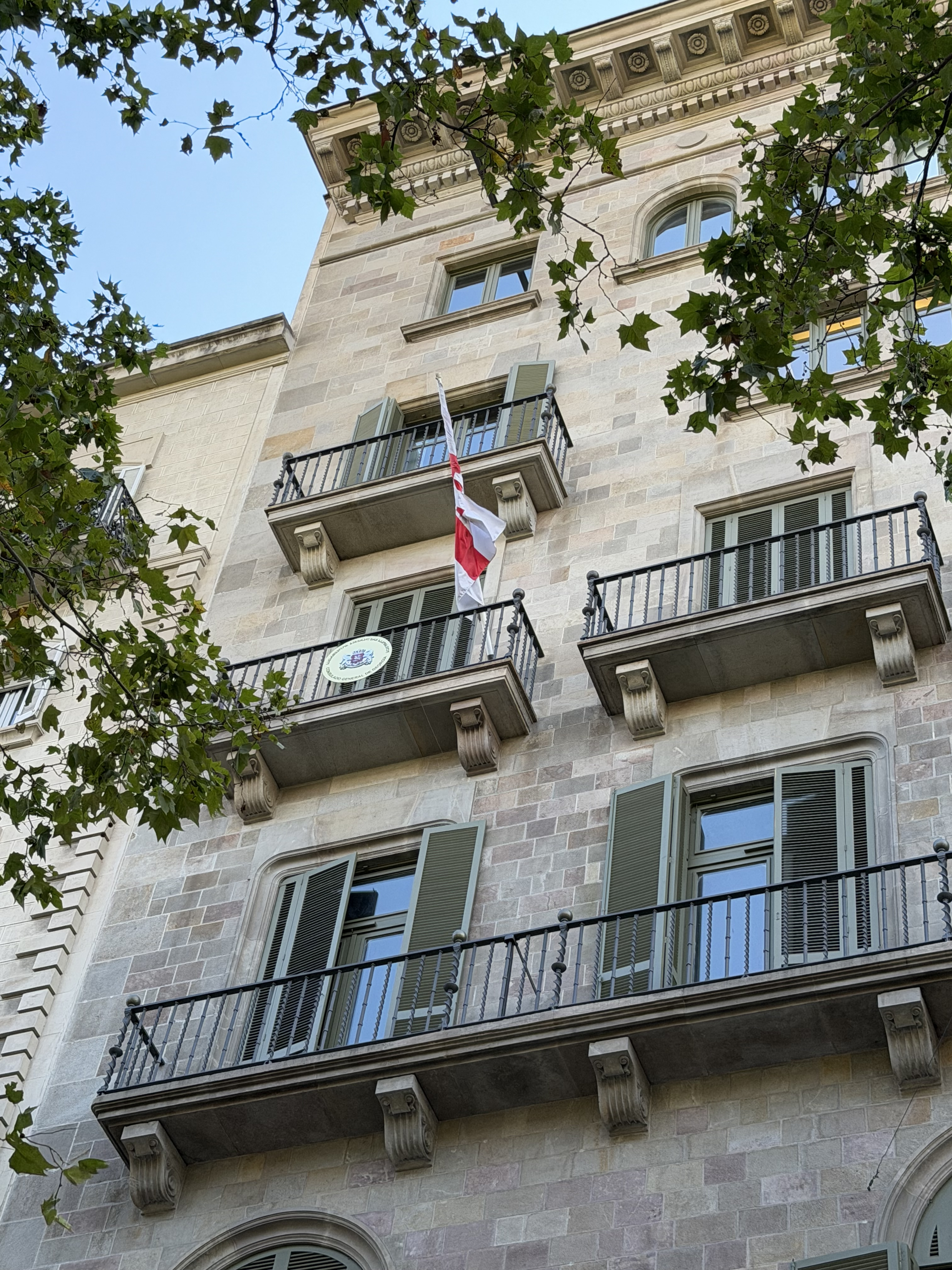
Consulate-General of Georgia in Barcelona

== See also ==
- Foreign relations of Georgia
- Foreign relations of Spain
- Georgians in Spain
- Georgia-NATO relations
- Georgia-EU relations
  - Accession of Georgia to the EU
