= Austria–Georgia relations =

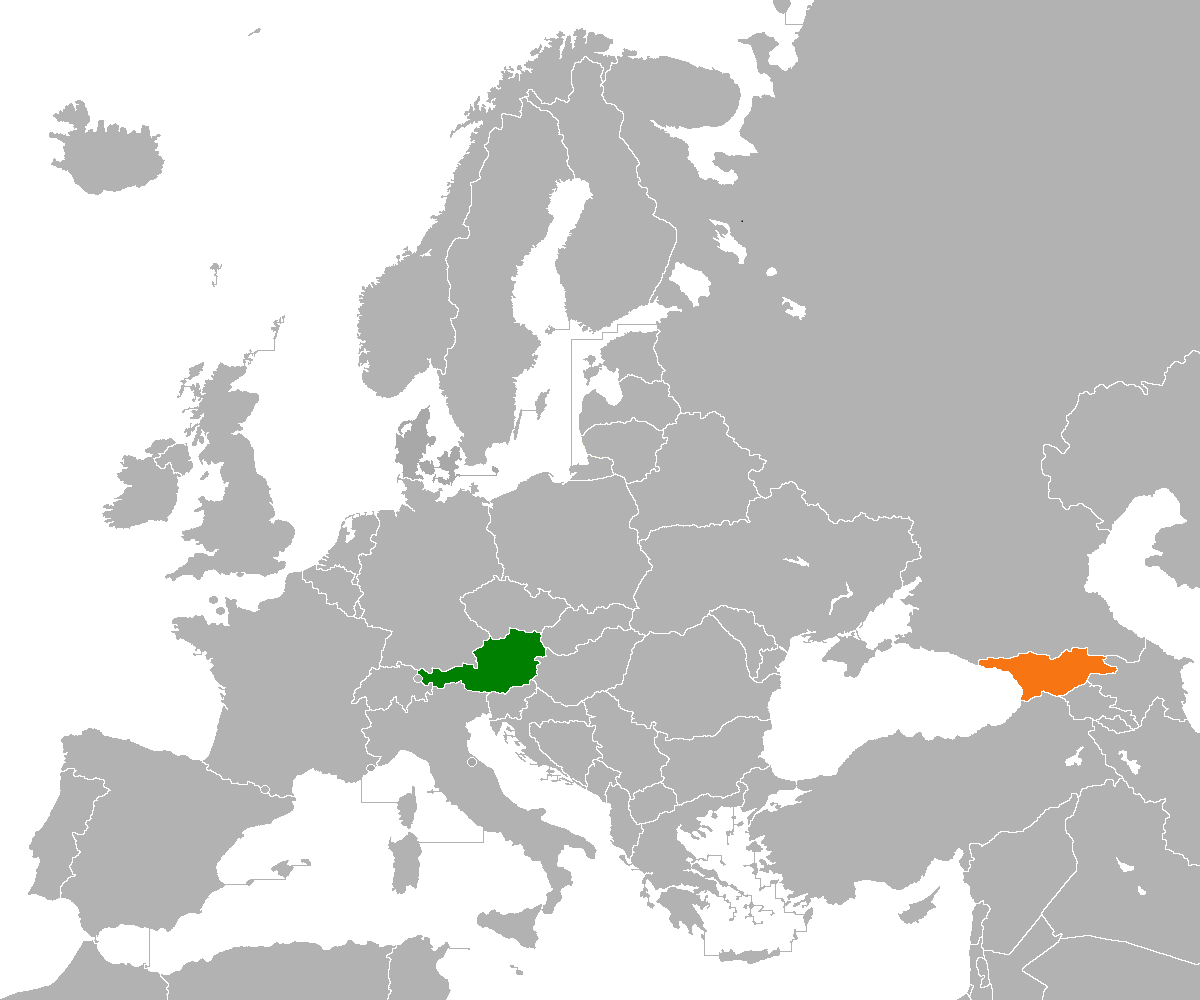
- Austria: Georgia

Foreign relations between Austria and Georgia. Both countries established diplomatic relations in 1992 and Georgia opened its embassy in Vienna in 1996. Austria has an embassy in Tbilisi that also accredited to Armenia, while Georgia has an embassy in Vienna and an honorary consulate in Graz. Austria is a member of the European Union, which Georgia applied for in 2022. Both nations are members of the Council of Europe.

== History ==
At the end of World War I, Austria-Hungary was, together with the other central powers, the German Empire and the Ottoman Empire, one of the first and only nations that recognized the independence of the short-lived Democratic Republic of Georgia in 1918. The first ambassador was Georg von und zu Franckenstein.

During the 2008 South Ossetia war, Austrian Foreign Minister Ursula Plassnik urged "Russia to respect the territorial integrity of Georgia, considering the UN resolution." She also said that Russia's military intervention in Georgia had seriously undermined its credibility as a reliable partner of the West.

== Resident diplomatic missions ==
- Austria has an embassy in Tbilisi.
- Georgia has an embassy in Vienna.
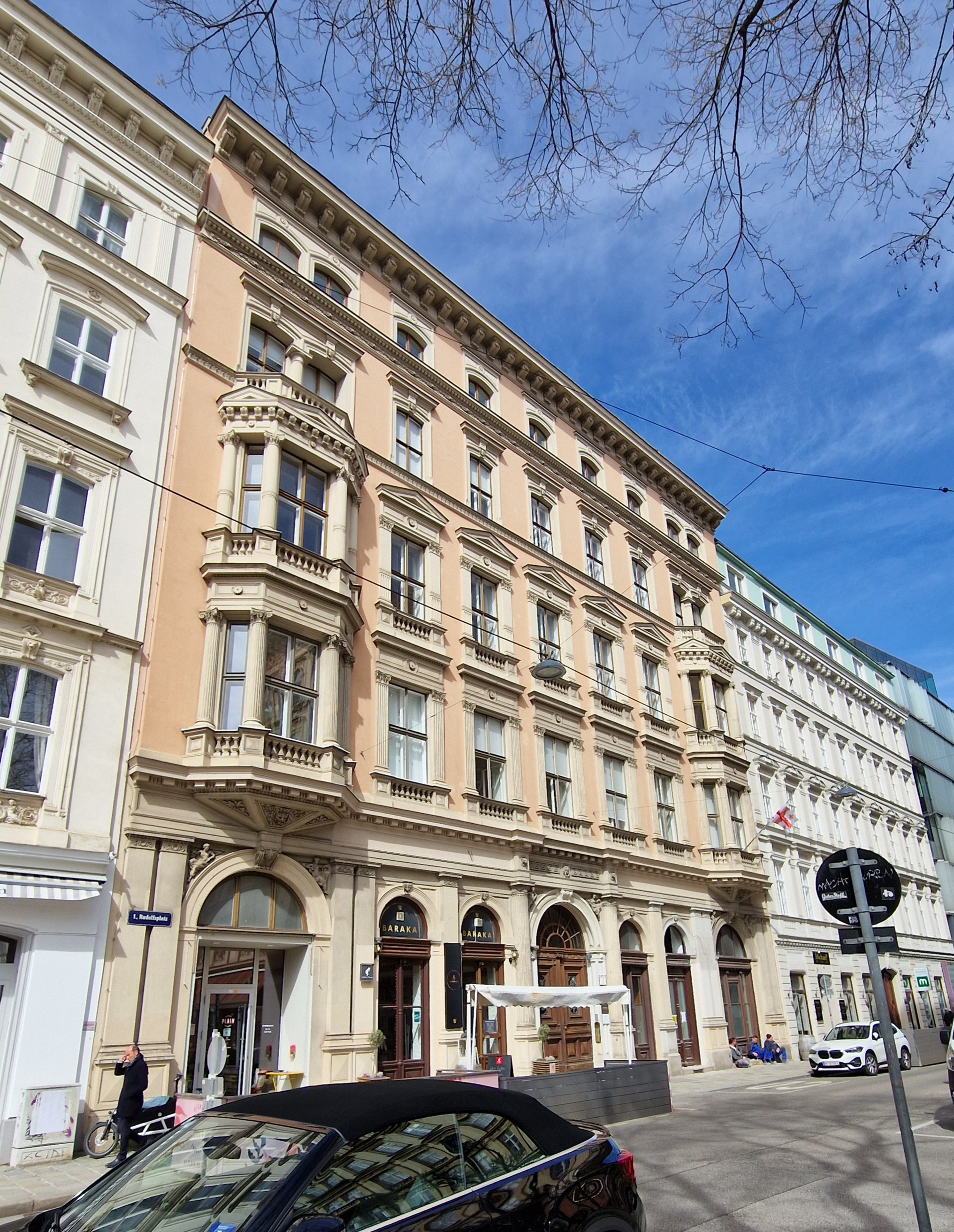
Embassy of Georgia in Vienna

== Notes ==
- The Embassy of Austria in Tbilisi is accredited to Armenia.

== See also ==
- Foreign relations of Austria
- Foreign relations of Georgia
- Georgia-EU relations
  - Accession of Georgia to the EU

== Bibliography ==
- Agstner, Rudolf (1999). Österreich im Kaukasus 1849-1918 (in German). Diplomatische Akademie. ISBN 978-3-902021-12-0.
- Bihl, Wolfdieter (1992). Die Kaukasus-Politik der Mittelmächte (in German). Böhlau. ISBN 978-3-205-05517-4.
