= Ukrainian humanitarian mission in Georgia (1993) =

Evacuation of Georgian refugees

- Part of War in Abkhazia (1992–1993)
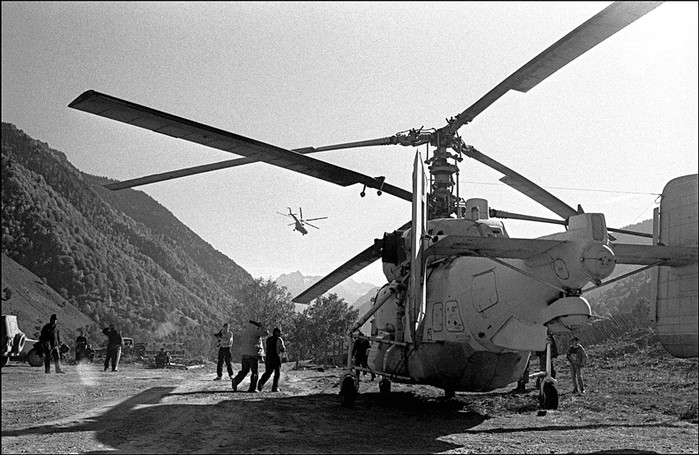
- Ukrainian Ka-27 during the mission
| Date | 8—26 October 1993 |
| Location | Abkhazia, North-Western Georgia |
| Result | 7,643 refugees airlifted to safety 487 tons of humanitarian aid delivered |

Belligerents
| Ukraine; Georgia | Abkhazia; Russia |

Commanders and leaders
| Leonid Kravchuk (Ukraine) Yevhen Vlasenko | (Abkhazia) Vladislav Ardzinba |

Strength
| 131 servicemen Total 21 units of aviation: 15 Mi-8MTV; 2 Ka-27; 1 An-12; 3 Il-76 | Unknown |

Casualties and losses
| 2 helicopters damaged (Note: Two helicopters were damaged by shelling: one received damage to the blades, the other experienced damage to the cabin and blades) | None reported |

The Ukrainian humanitarian mission in Georgia was an operation of the Armed Forces of Ukraine to help Georgia with the evacuation of the Georgian refugees in the Svaneti range towards the end of the war in Abkhazia in October 1993. This mission of Ukrainian pilots became the first ever Ukrainian humanitarian mission conducted without any assistance by international organizations. During the airlift from 10 to 14 October 1993, Ukrainian pilots on seventeen helicopters, under shelling from Abkhazian and Russian forces, made 291 sorties and saved around 8,000 people from ethnic cleansing. Those who remained were given 487 tons of humanitarian aid.

== Background ==
The war in Abkhazia nominally ended on September 30, 1993; the pause in fighting led to the creation of the de facto independent self-proclaimed state of Abkhazia and ethnic cleansing of Georgians on the proclaimed territories. The ethnic Georgian population of Svaneti had to flee from Abkhazian militants towards central Georgia through the mountain passes as Abkhazians pursued a policy of ethnically cleansing Georgians from the region. In total an estimated 250,000 Georgians in Abkhazia became refugees.

Those refugees faced extremely severe conditions, ranging from attacks by looters and violence to a sudden drop in temperatures in the mountains posing an additional danger. Georgian refugees began dying in the mountains due to a lack of food, water, and warm clothing.

The Georgian Army tried to evacuate the civilians. In September 1993, a Mi-8T of the Georgian Air Force transported refugees from Sakeni to Kutaisi. But during a scheduled return to Sakeni, the helicopter crashed into a mountain after experiencing a technical failure.

Afterwards, the Georgian government immediately reached out for help to the international community. In October 1993 President of Georgia Eduard Shevardnadze asked President of Ukraine Leonid Kravchuk and asked for help, which the Ukrainian president provided upon request.

== Preparations ==
For the operation, the Ukrainian government provided the following aircraft:

- 15 Мі-8 helicopters from the 488th Separate Helicopter Regiment (Home airfield — Vapniarka) and 320th Separate Helicopter Regiment (Kherson)
- two Ka-27 from the 555th Separate Anti-Submarine Mixed Aviation Regiment (Saky),
- one Аn-12 aircraft, which transported to Georgia the group of command and the logistics units.
- three Il-76 aircraft from 25th Transport aviation regiment, which carried the humanitarian cargo from Cologne to Tbilisi.

== Developments ==
The operation began on October 8, 1993; an An-12 aircraft from the Ukrainian Air Force was sent to Georgia, which carried a military group of 9 people for reconnaissance and the evaluation of situation and preparation of the plan for the rescue mission, and was led by major-general Yuri Petrov.

Ukrainian crews managed to fit 48 people into a helicopter that could normally hold 24 people by removing armor plating that was intended to protect pilots to reduce the weight of the helicopters. The helicopters were also completely unarmed, making them more vulnerable.

In the first day 570 people were rescued, and on the second day 2,162 were saved. By the end of the mission, Ukrainian aircrews had airlifted 7,643 people to safety and delivered 487 tons of humanitarian aid—all in extremely difficult conditions, complicated by the lack of proper landing pads, poor mountain weather, and fire from the ground.

Despite the fact that the helicopters prominently displayed red crosses on the side showing that they were for humanitarian purposes, they were still shelled from the ground by Abkhazian militants.

On October 16, 1993 the airlifting portion of the operation finished; however the operation did not finish until October 26, 1993 as cargo aircraft continued deliveries of humanitarian aid.

== Recognition ==
Many participants received state awards of Georgia on May 26, 2003. In December 1993 the Ukrainian government issued monetary bonuses to participants in the mission.

== See also ==
- Ukrainian involvement in the Iraq War
