= Georgia–European Union relations =

- European Union: Georgia

Diplomatic mission
- European Union Delegation, Tbilisi: Mission of Georgia, Brussels

The former European Community and Georgia established relations in 1992. After the Maastricht Treaty on creation of the European Union, Georgia deepened its ties with the EU through a Partnership and Cooperation Agreement (PCA) signed in 1996. In 2006, a five-year "Action Plan" of rapprochement was implemented in the context of the European Neighbourhood Policy (ENP). In 2009, relations between the two were further upgraded under the auspices of Eastern Partnership. In 2016, a comprehensive Association Agreement between the EU and Georgia went into force, providing Georgian citizens with visa-free travel to the EU, as well as access to some sectors of the European Single Market. Following Brexit, most of the existing EU-Georgia agreements applicable to the United Kingdom were renegotiated and agreed upon in 2019 bilaterally with the United Kingdom.

Georgia is a candidate for EU membership. A European Union Monitoring Mission in Georgia has been operating since 2009. In January 2021, Georgia was preparing to formally apply for EU membership in 2024. However, on 3 March 2022, Georgia submitted its membership application ahead of schedule, following the Russian invasion of Ukraine. In December 2023, the EU officially granted candidate status to Georgia. This made Georgia the first country in the South Caucasus region to obtain EU candidacy status.

In April 2023, a nationwide poll by the International Republican Institute found that 89 percent of Georgians support joining the EU, the highest number recorded for years.

== History ==
=== Early developments ===
The European Community and Georgia established relations in 1992.

The Council of the European Union's Regulation (EC) No 1975/95 of 4 August 1995 provided for food aid to be sent to the people of Georgia.

=== Adjara crisis (2004) ===
In Adjara, leader Aslan Abashidze was forced to resign in May 2004 following the Rose Revolution. EU CFSP Chief Javier Solana indicated in February 2007 that the EU could send troops to Georgia alongside Russian forces.

=== South Ossetia crisis (2006–08) ===
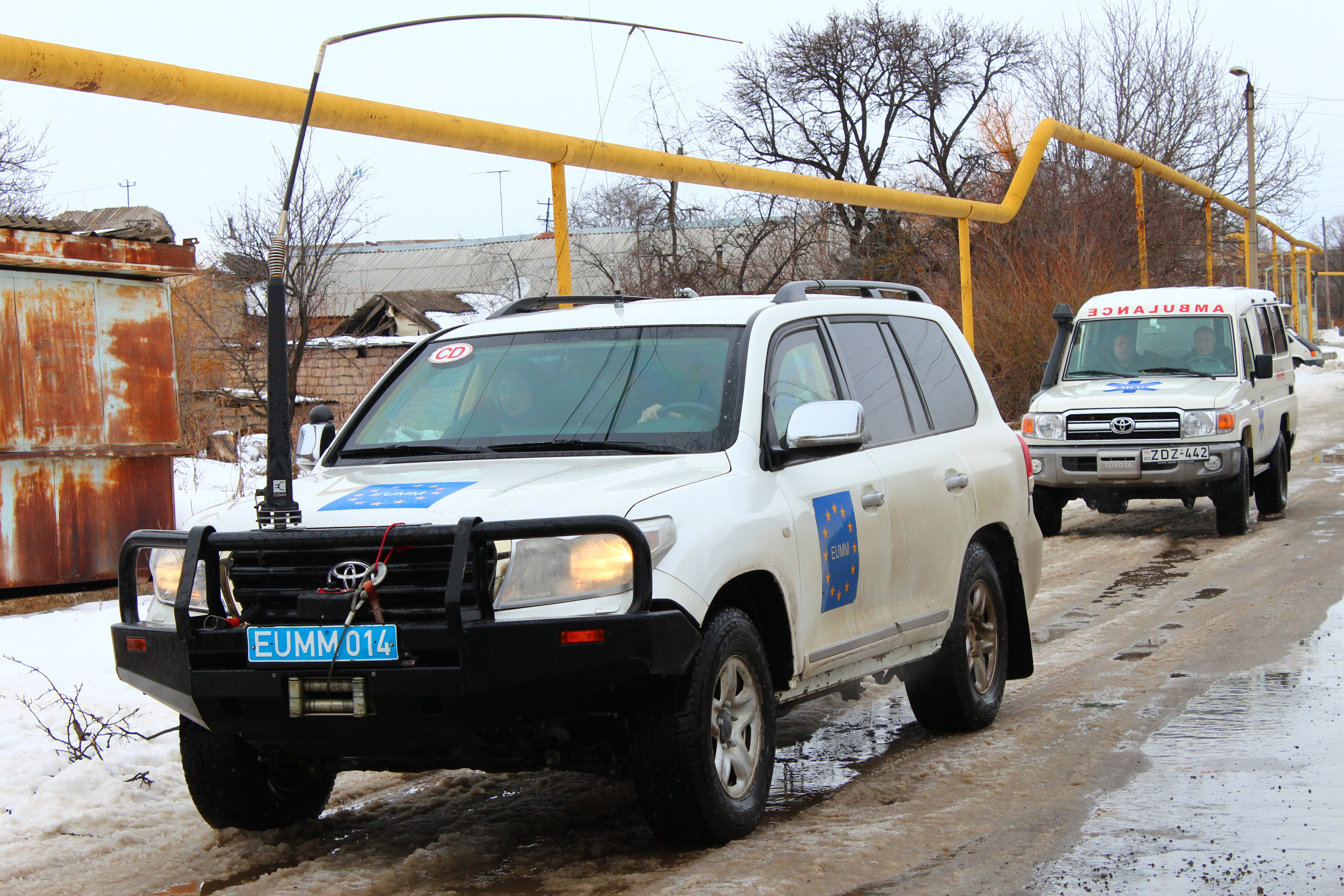
The EUMM patrols the South Ossetian administration boundary line in armored SUVs in February 2012.

In July 2006 the European Union referred to then-recent developments in the South Ossetia zone of conflict and to the Resolution of the Georgian Parliament on Peacekeeping Forces Stationed in the Conflict Zones, which was adopted on 18 July 2006 as follows:

The European Union is deeply concerned about continuing tension between Georgia and Russia and recent incidents in South Ossetia, which do not contribute to stability and freedom of movement. The European Union is particularly worried by the recent closure of the only recognized border crossing between Georgia and the Russian Federation. The European Union emphasises the importance of ensuring freedom of movement of goods and people, in particular by keeping the border crossing at Zemo Larsi open.

After the 2008 South Ossetia war an EU cease-fire monitoring mission in Georgia (EUMM Georgia) was sent to monitor the Russian troop withdrawal from "security zones" established by Russia around South Ossetia and Abkhazia. The mission started on 1 October 2008 and was extended by the EU in July 2009 for one year while the EU expressed concern that Russia was blocking other observers from working there. A United Nations Security Council resolution aimed at extending its UN Observer Mission in Georgia was vetoed by Russia on 15 June 2009.

=== European Neighbourhood Policy Action Plan (2006–11) ===
On 2 October 2006, a joint statement on the agreed text of the Georgia-European Union Action Plan within the European Neighbourhood Policy (ENP) was issued. The Action Plan was formally approved at the EU-Georgia Cooperation Council session on 14 November 2006 in Brussels.

=== Association Agreement (2013–present) ===
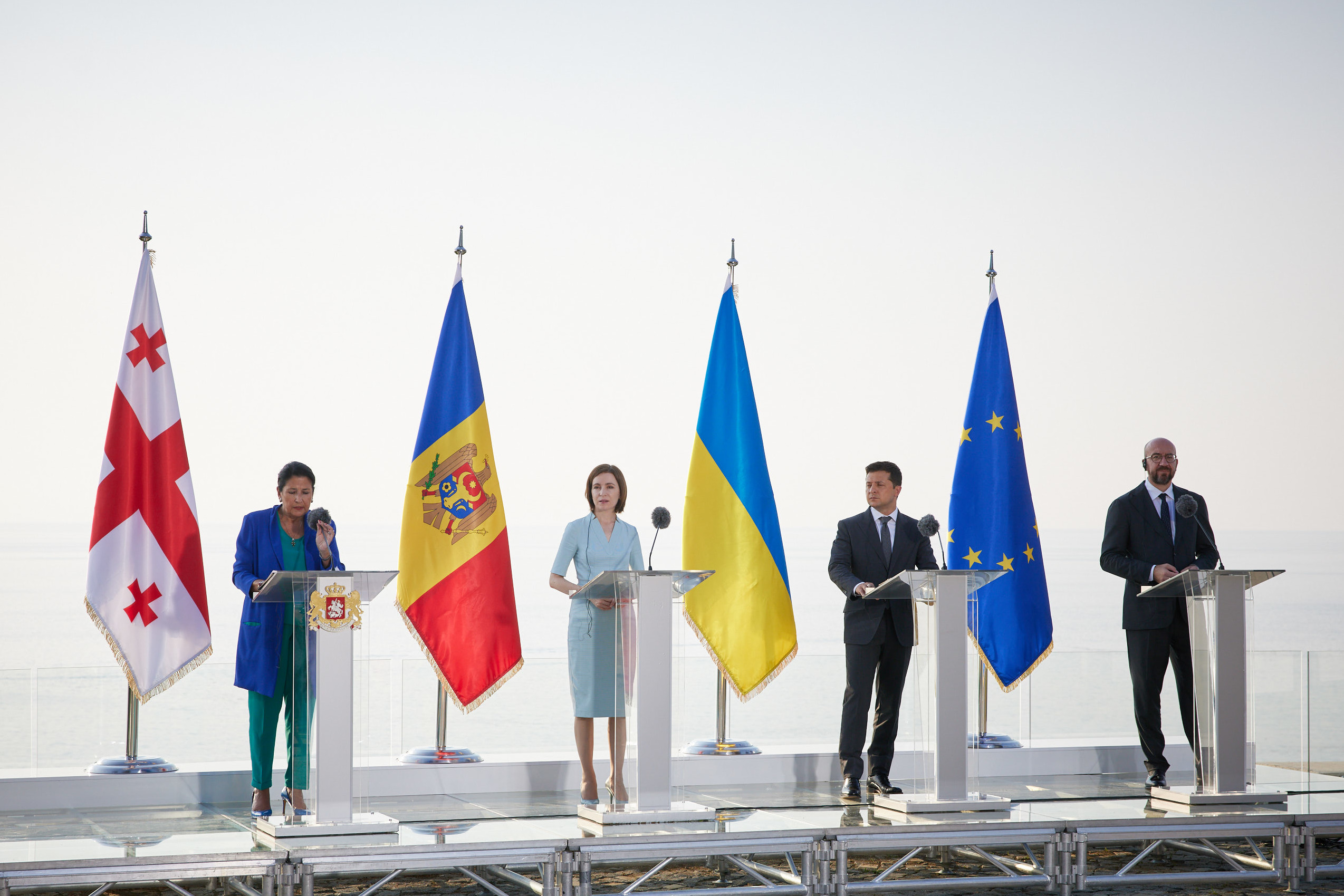
President of Georgia Salome Zourabichvili, President of Moldova Maia Sandu, President of Ukraine Volodymyr Zelenskyy and President of the European Council Charles Michel during the 2021 Batumi International Conference. In 2014, the EU signed Association Agreements with all the three states.

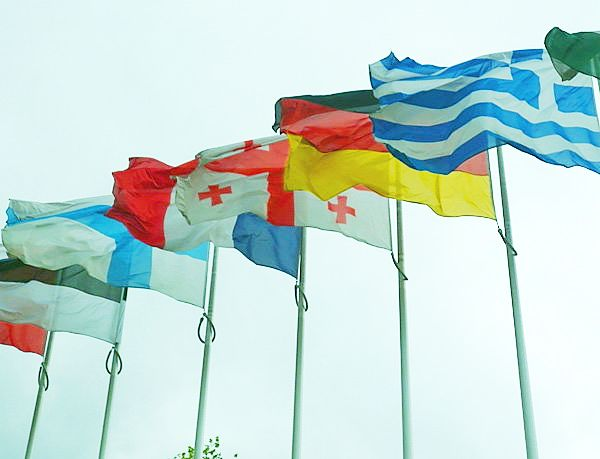
Georgian flag in front of the Council of Europe

To enhance their relationship, the EU and Georgia began negotiating an Association Agreement (AA) and a Deep and Comprehensive Free Trade Agreement. In November 2012, European Commissioner for Neighbourhood and Enlargement Stefan Fule stated that the AA negotiations could be finalized by November 2013. In February 2013, Tamar Beruchachvili, the Deputy State Minister for European and Euro-Atlantic Integration of Georgia, stated that Georgia had no plans to join the Eurasian Economic Union, which Fule has warned Ukraine would be incompatible with the agreements with the EU. A ceremony on the initialling of the AA by the Georgian Foreign Minister Maia Panjikidze and EU High Representative for Foreign Affairs and Security Policy Catherine Ashton was held at the Eastern Partnership summit on 29 November 2013. It was formally signed on 27 June 2014, and had to be ratified by the EU, Euratom, their member states and Georgia. A second agreement, governing the country's involvement in EU crisis management operations, was also signed.

The Association Agreement, much of which provisionally came into force in September, has been fully ratified by Georgia and all EU member states. On 18 December 2014 the European Parliament approved the Association Agreement. Members backed the treaty by 490 votes in favour to 76 against, with 57 abstentions. The agreement entered into force on 1 July 2016.

Parliament building in Tbilisi

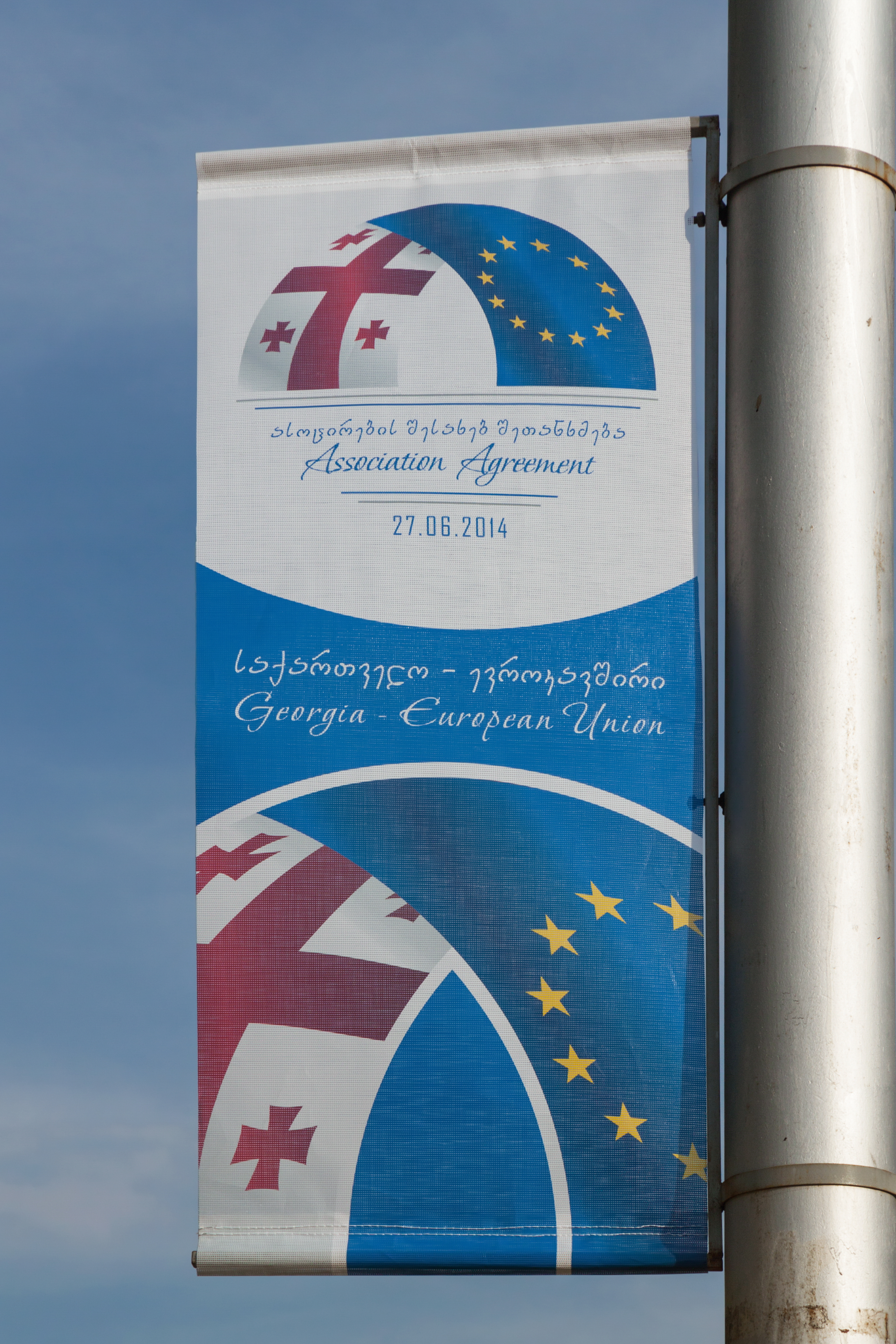
Georgia-European Union Association Agreement poster in Tbilisi

EU-States which ratified Association Agreement with Georgia

==== Ratification ====
The EU-Georgia Association Agreement was ratified by legislative bodies of every single EU member state. Detailed ratification timeline and vote counts are outlined in the below collapsible list (click the "show" button to expand the list):

Full ratification timeline
Signatory	Date	Institution	In Favour	Against	AB	Deposited	Reference
Austria	8 July 2015	National Council	Approved			28 August 2015	
Austria	23 July 2015	Federal Council	Approved			28 August 2015	
Austria		Presidential Assent	Granted			28 August 2015	
Belgium
Belgium	23 April 2015	Chamber of Representatives	101	17	20	1 February 2016	
Belgium		Royal Assent (federal law)				1 February 2016	
Belgium	1 July 2015	Walloon; Parliament / (regional) (community)	63	2	4	1 February 2016	
Belgium	1 July 2015	Walloon; Parliament / (regional) (community)	61	2	4	1 February 2016	
Belgium	22 June 2015	German-speaking Community	16	2	1	1 February 2016	
Belgium	24 June 2015	French Community	71	0	8	1 February 2016	
Belgium	20 November 2015	Brussels Regional Parliament	69	3	3	1 February 2016	
Belgium	20 November 2015	Brussels United; Assembly / (FR language) (NL language)	53	3	1	1 February 2016	
Belgium	20 November 2015	Brussels United; Assembly / (FR language) (NL language)	14	0	2	1 February 2016	
Belgium	17 June 2015	Flemish; Parliament / (regional) (community)	82	18		1 February 2016	
Belgium	17 June 2015	Flemish; Parliament / (regional) (community)	87	19		1 February 2016	
Belgium	24 June 2015	COCOF Assembly	71	0	8	1 February 2016	
Bulgaria	24 July 2014	National Assembly	91	0	0	9 September 2014	
Bulgaria	28 July 2014	Presidential Assent	Granted			9 September 2014	
Croatia	12 December 2014	Parliament	116	0	1	24 March 2015	
Croatia	18 December 2014	Presidential Assent	Granted			24 March 2015	
Cyprus	7 May 2015	House of Representatives	Approved			18 August 2015	
Cyprus	22 May 2015	Presidential Assent	Granted			18 August 2015	
Czech Republic	18 March 2015	Senate	56	0	6	12 June 2015	
Czech Republic	29 April 2015	Chamber of Deputies	116	1	51	12 June 2015	
Czech Republic	19 May 2015	Presidential Assent	Granted			12 June 2015	
Denmark	18 December 2014	Parliament	101	7	0	18 February 2015	
Estonia	4 November 2014	Assembly	66	0	0	12 January 2015	
Estonia	13 November 2014	Presidential Assent	Granted			12 January 2015	
European Union and EAEC	18 December 2014	European Parliament	490	76	57	19 April 2016 (EAEC); 23 May 2016 (EU)	
European Union and EAEC		Council of the European Union				19 April 2016 (EAEC); 23 May 2016 (EU)	
Finland	10 March 2015	Parliament	Approved			6 May 2015	
Finland	24 April 2015	Presidential Assent	Granted			6 May 2015	
France	29 October 2015	Senate	Approved			15 December 2015	
France	25 June 2015	National Assembly	Approved			15 December 2015	
France	9 November 2015	Presidential Assent	Granted			15 December 2015	
Germany	8 May 2015	Bundesrat	Approved			22 July 2015	
Germany	26 March 2015	Bundestag	Approved			22 July 2015	
Germany	27 May 2015	Presidential Assent	Granted			22 July 2015	
(Georgia (country)) Georgia	18 July 2014	Parliament	123	0	0	25 July 2014	
(Georgia (country)) Georgia		Presidential Assent	Granted			25 July 2014	
Greece	18 November 2015	Parliament	Approved			14 December 2015	
Greece	24 November 2015	Presidential Promulgation	Granted			14 December 2015	
Hungary	25 November 2014	National Assembly	127	6	0	7 April 2015	
Hungary	5 December 2014	Presidential Assent	Granted			7 April 2015	
(Republic of Ireland) Ireland	27 January 2015	Dáil Éireann	58	19	0	17 April 2015	
Italy	26 November 2015	Senate	202	37	10	3 February 2016	
Italy	29 July 2015	Chamber of Deputies	310	93	34	3 February 2016	
Italy	7 December 2015	Presidential Assent	Granted			3 February 2016	
Latvia	14 July 2014	Parliament	81	0	0	2 October 2014	
Latvia	18 July 2014	Presidential Assent	Granted			2 October 2014	
Lithuania	8 July 2014	Parliament	84	0	1	29 July 2014	
Lithuania	11 July 2014	Presidential Assent	Granted			29 July 2014	
Luxembourg	18 March 2015	Chamber of Deputies	55	2	0	12 May 2015	
Luxembourg	12 April 2015	Grand Ducal Promulgation	Granted			12 May 2015	
Malta	21 August 2014	House of Representatives	Approved			29 August 2014	
Netherlands	7 July 2015	Senate	Adopted			21 September 2015	
Netherlands	7 April 2015	House of Representatives	119	31	0	21 September 2015	
Netherlands	28 July 2015	Royal Promulgation	Granted			21 September 2015	
Poland	5 March 2015	Senate	75	0	0	22 May 2015	
Poland	6 February 2015	Sejm	439	0	1	22 May 2015	
Poland	26 March 2015	Presidential Assent	Granted			22 May 2015	
Portugal	2 April 2015	National Assembly	Approved			8 October 2015	
Portugal	19 May 2015	Presidential Assent	Granted			8 October 2015	
Romania	2 July 2014	Chamber of Deputies	298	0	0	14 July 2014	
Romania	3 July 2014	Senate	111	0	2	14 July 2014	
Romania	9 July 2014	Presidential Assent	Granted			14 July 2014	
Slovakia	23 September 2014	National Council	117	0	1	21 October 2014	
Slovakia	16 October 2014	Presidential Assent	Granted			21 October 2014	
Slovenia	13 May 2015	National Assembly	69	3	0	27 July 2015	
Slovenia	21 May 2015	Presidential Assent	Granted			27 July 2015	
Spain	27 May 2015	Senate	Approved			28 July 2015	
Spain	30 April 2015	Congress of Deputies	303	0	1	28 July 2015	
Spain		Royal Assent	Granted			28 July 2015	
Sweden	26 November 2014	Parliament	249	44	0	9 January 2015	
United Kingdom	23 February 2015	House of Commons	Approved			8 April 2015	
United Kingdom	9 March 2015	House of Lords	Approved			8 April 2015	
United Kingdom	19 March 2015	Royal Assent	Granted			8 April 2015	

== Accession of Georgia to the European Union ==
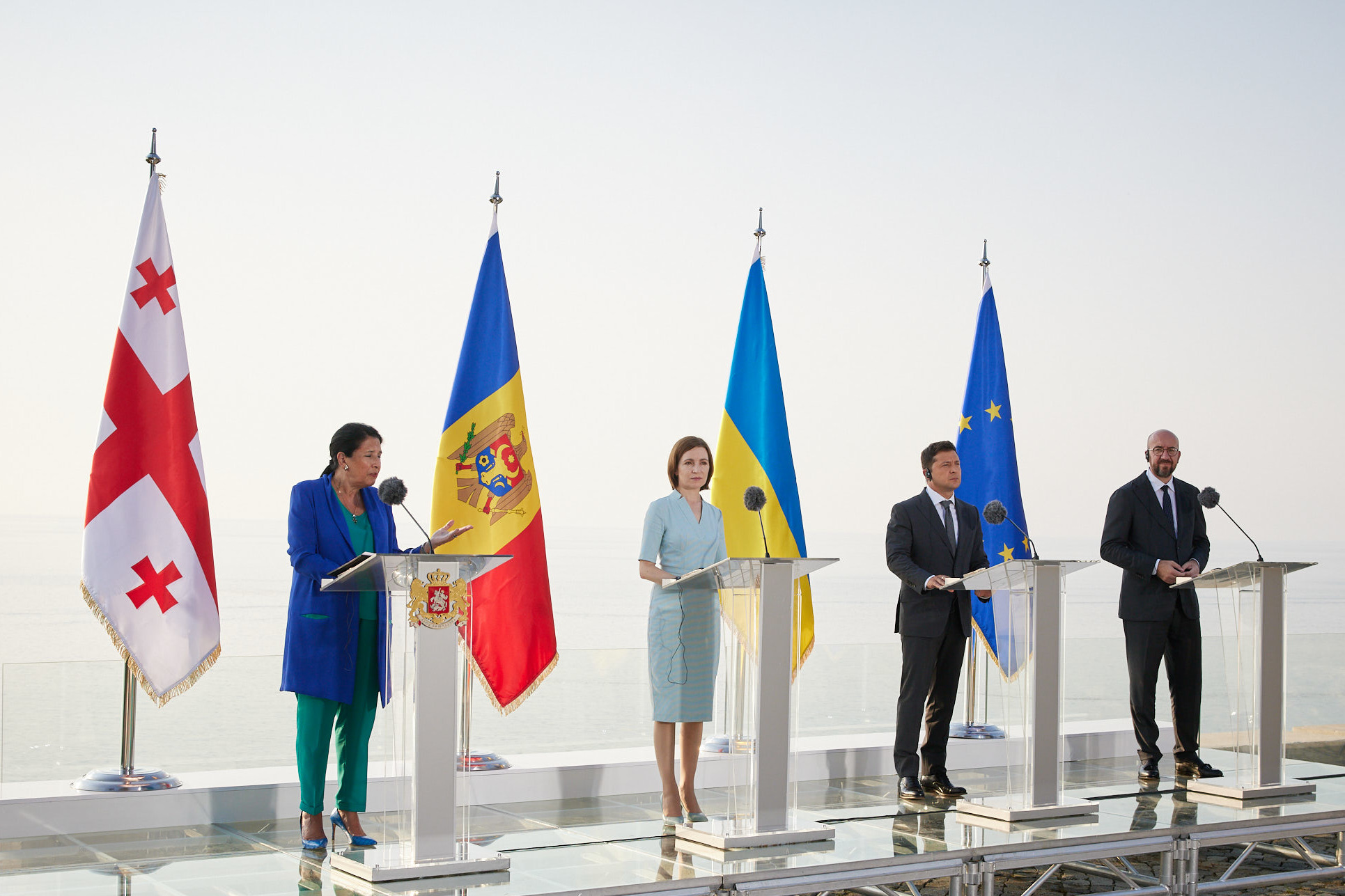
President of Georgia Salome Zourabichvili, President of Moldova Maia Sandu, President of Ukraine Volodymyr Zelenskyy and President of the European Council Charles Michel during the 2021 Batumi International Conference. In 2014, the EU signed Association Agreements with all the three states.

Countries that could join the European Union Current members Official candidate countries Applicant / potential candidate countries Potential membership possible (including the United Kingdom) Countries geographically located (at least partially) in Europe Membership not possible (Application rejected by the European Council)

On 12 January 2002, the European Parliament noted that Georgia may enter the EU in the future. The European Parliament passed a resolution in 2014 stating that "in accordance with Article 49 of the Treaty on European Union, Georgia, Moldova and Ukraine, as well as any other European country, have a European perspective and can apply for EU membership in compliance with the principles of democracy, respect for fundamental freedoms and human rights, minority rights and ensuring the rule of rights." Membership is welcomed by Georgians, with 77% of the population approving the government's goal to join the EU and only 11% opposing it.

Georgia's former President Mikheil Saakashvili has expressed a desire for Georgia to join the EU. This view has been explicitly expressed on several occasions as links to the United States, EU and NATO have been strengthened in an attempt to move away from the Russian sphere of influence. Territorial integrity issues in Ajaria were dealt with after the Rose Revolution, when leader Aslan Abashidze was forced to resign in May 2004. However, unresolved territorial integrity issues have again risen to the forefront in South Ossetia and Abkhazia as a result of the 2008 South Ossetia War. On 11 November 2010, Georgian Deputy Prime Minister Giorgi Baramidze announced that Georgia wants to cooperate with Ukraine in their attempt to join the European Union.

The European Parliament notes that in accordance with Article 49 of the Treaty with the EU, Georgia, Moldova and Ukraine, like any other European country, have a European perspective and can apply for EU membership in accordance with the principles of democracy - it said in a resolution of the European Parliament in Brussels, adopted at the last session before the elections to the European Parliament, which took place on 23–25 May 2014.

Georgian Prime Minister Irakli Garibashvili said at a press conference in Brussels on 27 June 2014 that Georgia could be a full EU member within 5–10 years. However, he stressed that Georgia had not fixed a date for bidding for EU membership.

=== Georgia officially applies for EU membership ===
On 17 January 2021, Irakli Kobakhidze was elected the chairman of the ruling Georgian Dream party. He announced plans for Georgia to officially apply for EU membership in 2024. Amid the 2022 Russo-Ukrainian War, this was expedited to 3 March 2022. On 7 March, the EU said it will formally assess Georgia's application. On 11 April, Georgia has received EU Membership Questionnaire to fill out and send it back for the review in May. According to Garibashvili, the response to the first part was submitted by May 2, remarking on his Twitter account, "I am sure of Georgia's success on in pursuit of the ultimate goal of the Georgian people", while the second and final part was submitted on 10 May 2022.

On 17 June 2022, the European Commission recommended that Georgia be given the perspective to become a member of the European Union, but deferred recommending it be given candidate status until after certain conditions were met. On 23 June 2022, the European Parliament adopted a resolution calling for the immediate granting of candidate status for membership of the European Union to Ukraine and Moldova, as well as to support the European perspective for Georgia. On 23 June 2022, the European Council expressed readiness to grant Georgia the status of a candidate for accession to the European Union after a set of recommended reforms.

The EU asked Georgia to complete economic reforms including more investment in education, renewable energy generation, and transportation. Requested political reforms included reduced political polarization, election reforms, judicial reform, stronger anti-corruption institutions, implementing "de-oligarchisation", reducing organized crime, protect journalists from government interference and criminal threats, protect vulnerable groups against criminal human rights violations, improve gender equality, reduce violence against women, increase decision-making influence of civil society, and make the Public Defender more independent.

In March 2023, the Georgian government withdrew draft legislation putting controls on "foreign agents", after condemnation from EU officials.

In September EU foreign affairs chief, Josep Borrell, advised that Georgia needed to do more to advance in its accession aims. In this/Borrell's 8 September 2023 visit to Georgia Borrell stated that nine of the 12 conditions, as stipulated by the EU in 2022, for granting Georgia its membership candidate status remained unfulfilled. Borrell also condemned Georgia's May 2023 consent to resume direct flights between Georgia and Russia, and he claimed that EU applicant countries should act in accordance with the EU policies of "isolating Russia for invading Ukraine last year". He also stated that the Georgian authorities “must ensure” a “proper environment” to depolarise the existing “tense political scene” and highlighted that the ruling party Georgian Dream announcement made early September 2023 to start an impeachment process against President of Georgia Salome Zourabichvili for an alleged unauthorized EU trip could further strengthen political polarization. Borrell also noted that it seemed that Georgia's compatibility with the EU's efforts to have a joint approach on priority issues “was not very high”, and the direction required to be improved.

On 15 September 2023 Georgian Prime Minister Irakli Garibashvili alleged that the EU would have “no reasons” to reject Georgia's candidacy in December 2023, Garibashvili claimed that “all remaining issues” related to the reform agenda outlined by the EU in 2022 for granting the status would be resolved by the end of that month (September 2023).

On 6 October 2023, Croatian Prime Minister Andrej Plenković highlighted his support for granting Georgia EU candidate status during the European Political Community Summit in Granada, Spain.

On 12 October 2023, Hungarian Prime Minister Viktor Orbán has called EU's 2022 rejection of membership candidate status for Georgia "very disappointing" and "unfair decision" in light of granting the candidacy to Moldova and Ukraine. Orban has also said that the decision contradicts the "European interests".

On 13 October 2023, the National Assembly of Bulgaria passed a resolution in favor of granting Georgia EU candidate status.

Romanian ambassador to Georgia reaffirmed Romania's support for granting Georgia the candidate status in December 2023.

On 8 November 2023, the European Commission recommended giving candidate status to Georgia. On 15 December 2023, the European Council agreed to giving candidate status to Georgia.

However, following the Georgian government's approval of legislation which would require non-governmental organizations to register as foreign agents or "organizations carrying the interests of a foreign power" and disclose the sources of their income if the funds they receive from abroad amount to more than 20% of their total revenue, which led to widespread protests in the country, the European Council stated in June 2024 that this represented "backsliding on the steps set out in the Commission’s recommendation for candidate status" and that the accession process would be de facto on hold until the government changes course. On 9 July 2024, the EU ambassador in Georgia announced that the European Union had suspended the country's accession process.

The 2024 Georgian parliamentary elections resulted in Georgian Dream retaining power, but were disputed by opposition parties which claimed that the vote was not free and fair and was subject to widespread voter fraud. The European Parliament adopted a non-binding resolution which rejected the validity of the results, and called for the vote to be repeated within a year. On 28 November 2024, Georgian Prime Minister Irakli Kobakhidze announced that Georgia's EU accession negotiations had been suspended until the end of 2028, though he insisted that his government would continue to implement the reforms required for accession and that it still planned for Georgia to join the EU by 2030.

== Visa liberalization dialogue ==
In June 2012, the EU and Georgia began a visa liberalisation dialogue to allow for visa-free travel of Georgian citizens to the European Union. The talks aimed to have a Visa Liberalisation Action Plan in place by the end of the year. The action plan was delivered to Georgia on 25 February 2013. The new project on 'Strengthening the capacity of the Georgian Government in border management and migration regulation' which was launched in Tbilisi by the EU Delegation to Georgia, will be implemented by the International Organisation for Migration (IOM) and International Centre for Migration Policy Development (ICMPD), the EU Delegation to Georgia said in its statement on 24 January 2014. Thus, Georgia will take another step towards visa-free travel to the Schengen area through an EU-funded project which will help to increase the capacity of the Georgian authorities in the field of integrated border management and migration. In December 2015, the Commission issued a progress report that found that Georgia met all the conditions for its citizens be granted visa-free travel to the Schengen area. The European Commission formally proposed Georgia be granted visa free travel in March 2016. The Committee of Permanent Representatives gave its approval in October 2016, and it was approved by the European Parliament in February 2017. On 8 March 2017 the Official EU Journal published a legislation allowing Georgians owning biometric passports to travel to the Schengen Area visa-free. The legislation came into full effect on 28 March 2017, allowing Georgian citizens to travel for short periods to most EU member countries without a visa. In 2025 the EU warned that it might suspend visa free travel for Georgian citizens due to backsliding of rule-of-law of visa alignment commitments.

== Georgia's foreign relations with EU member states ==
- Austria
- Belgium
- Bulgaria
- Croatia
- Cyprus
- Czech Republic
- Denmark
- Estonia
- Finland
- France
- Germany
- Greece
- Hungary
- (Republic of Ireland) Ireland
- Italy
- Latvia
- Lithuania
- Luxembourg
- Malta
- Netherlands
- Poland
- Portugal
- Romania
- Slovakia
- Slovenia
- Spain
- Sweden

== See also ==
- Foreign relations of Georgia
- Foreign relations of the European Union
- Human rights in Georgia (country)
- Georgia–NATO relations
- Accession of Armenia to the EU
- Accession of Moldova to the EU
- Accession of Ukraine to the EU
- Armenia-EU Association Agreement
- Armenia-EU relations
- Azerbaijan-EU relations
- Association Trio
- Moldova-EU Association Agreement
- Moldova-EU relations
- Ukraine-EU Association Agreement
- Ukraine-EU relations
- Potential enlargement of the EU
- Eastern Partnership
- Euronest Parliamentary Assembly
- EU Strategy for the South Caucasus
- INOGATE
