= Davitiani =

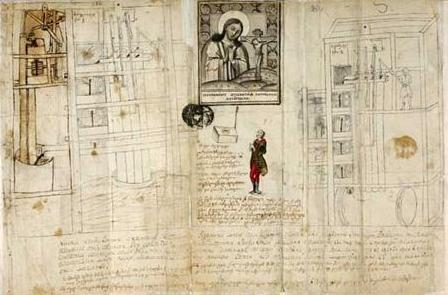
- One of the original manuscripts of Davitiani
- Author: Davit Guramishvili
- Original title: დავითიანი
- Language: Georgian
- Subject: various
- Genre: autobiography Verse; Poem
- Publication date: 1894 (1st publishing); 1787 (original)
- Publication place: Georgia
- Pages: 294 (1st publishing)

Davitiani (Georgian: დავითიანი) is the work of autobiographical poetry by Davit Guramishvili. Apart from the author's turbulent and eventful life, the book explores subjects such as religion, politics, patriotism and war. Despite being generally regarded as the most important work of Georgian literature in the 18th century, it was never published in the author's lifetime. While the poems were written in various periods of Guramishvili's life, the most important works were created in the last decades thereof. The author sent the raw manuscript from Myrhorod, Ukraine, where he resided at the time, to Tbilisi, Georgia in 1787 where it remained unpublished until the following century.
