= Davit Guramishvili =

Georgian poet (1705–1792)

დავით გურამიშვილი David Guramishvili
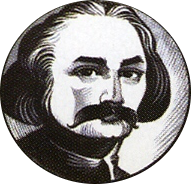
- Born: 1705; Gorisubani, Kingdom of Kartli
- Died: 21 July 1792 (aged 86–87); Myrhorod, Russian Empire
- Occupations: poet, thinker, prince
- Writing career
- Period: Reign of King Vakhtang VI
- Genre: poetry
- Notable work: Davitiani

Prince Davit Guramishvili (Georgian: დავით გურამიშვილი; 1705 – 21 July 1792) was a Georgian poet of pre-Romantic Georgian literature. He is known for writing Davitiani, an autobiographical book of poetry that recounts his years serving abroad in the Russian military.

== Biography ==
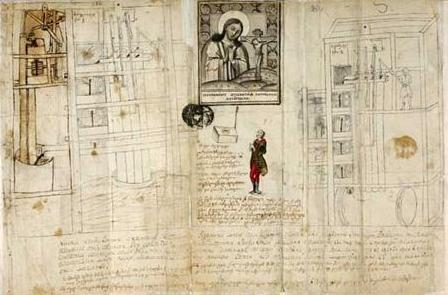
A manuscript of Davitiani by Guramishvili

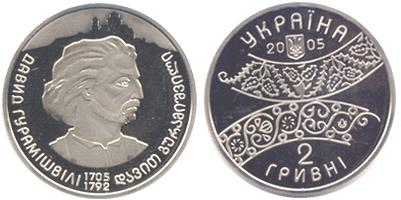
2 Ukrainian hryvnia jubilee coin

Born in the side of Imereti, village of Gorisubani into the Georgian princely (tavadi) family of Guramishvili (a branch of the greater Amilakhvari house), Davit Guramishvili spent his early years in his patrimonial estate near Saguramo. As an eighteen-year-old he took part in the battle of Zedavela, which resulted in the defeat of King Vakhtang VI at the hands of Ottoman army, Dagestani clansmen and renegade Georgians that plunged Georgia into complete anarchy. This period is chronicled in several sections of Guramishvili's Davitiani (დავითიანი) conventionally called Georgia’s Afflictions (ქართლის ჭირი).

In 1727/8 Guramishvili was snatched from his bride by the marauding tribesmen from Dagestan and spent several months in captivity before he managed to escape and make his way on foot to the north. Through the pathless mountains, he continued his way into the Terek Valley where he encountered a Cossack station. From there, headed for Moscow and joined King Vakhtang VI's entourage in their Russian exile. The sincere and vivid account of his imprisonment, his despair and attempts to escape, and his religious solace form the next twenty-five poems of his collection.

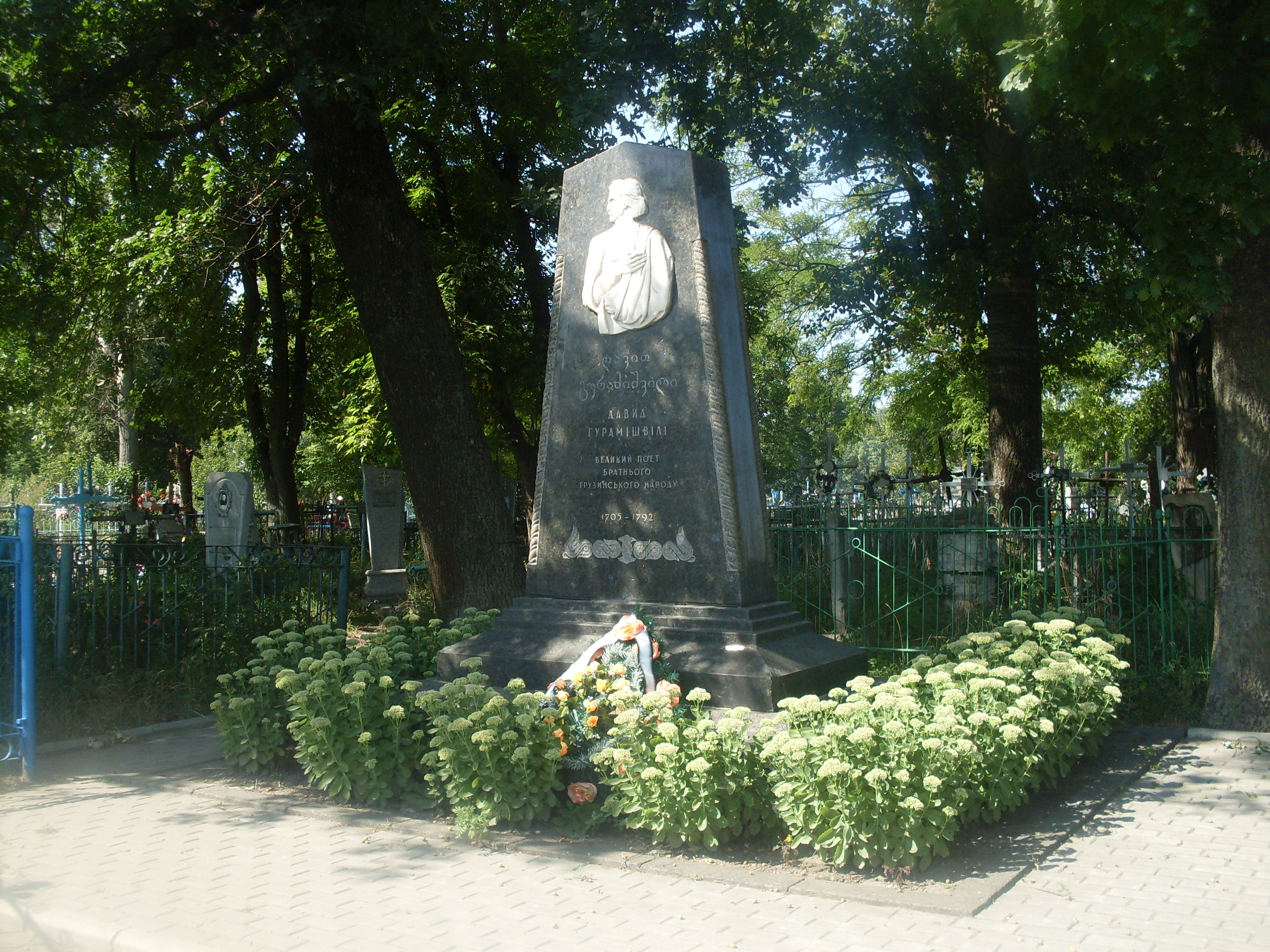
The grave of Davit Guramishvili in Myrhorod, Ukraine

In Moscow, he engaged in Vakhtang's cultural and educational enterprises. Following the king's death in 1737, his nobles, including Guramishvili, pledged their loyalty to the Russian crown and joined the Imperial army, forming a Georgian Hussar Regiment. On this occasion, Guramishvili was bestowed with estates at Myrhorod and Zubovka in Ukraine. As a Russian Hussar officer, he fought in the wars against Ottoman Empire (1735-1739), Sweden (1741-1743) and in the Seven Years' War (1756–1763) during which he was wounded and captured by the Prussian army. It was not until December 1759 that he was released from the Magdeburg prison and allowed to return to Russia. Invalidated, Guramishvili retired from the military service and withdrew into his estate where he lived together with his young wife Princess Tatiana Avalishvili.

Here he introduced Georgian water-mills to the Ukrainian peasantry and wrote poetry of lament, repent, and console for the misfortunes of Georgia and his own life. Apart from the Georgian folk sub-text, he also exploited Russian, Ukrainian and Polish motifs and combined, in the words of Professor Donald Rayfield, "two apparently incompatible elements, the Georgian psalmist’s spiritual asceticism and the Russian peasant’s carnal hedonism."

A surprising shift from religious fervor to playful eroticism follows in Zubovka (ზუბოვკა), a song of dalliance with a peasant girl. The most vernal and pastoral of his poems, Katsvia the Shepherd (ქაცვია მწყემსი) is a surreal idyll in which the poet narrates family life of the Georgian mountains and imagines the Eden Georgia without war, corruption, and natural calamity. The whole compilation concludes with a revert to religious contemplation, with the poet's testament and epitaph.

In 1787, at the age of 82, Guramishvili accidentally met the Georgian prince Mirian, sent by his father King Heraclius II of Georgia on a diplomatic mission to Russia. Mirian brought Guramishvili's manuscript to Georgia where it was published in 1870. In 1792, the poet died and was buried at the Assumption Church in Myrhorod.

== See also ==
- Besiki
- Sayat-Nova
